= Bavarian TV Awards =

Television award in Germany

- Native name: Bayerischer Fernsehpreis
- Description: Television award presented for outstanding achievements in German television
- Country: Germany
- Presented by: Government of Bavaria
- Website: https://www.stmd.bayern.de/themen/film-games-und-virtual-reality/bayerischer-fernsehpreis

The Bavarian TV Awards (German: Bayerischer Fernsehpreis) is an award presented by the government of Bavaria, Germany since 1989. The prize symbol is the "Blue Panther", a figure from the Nymphenburg Porcelain Manufactory. The prize money is €10,000 (Special prize: €20,000).

== Winners ==
=== 2021 ===
- Michaela May, Honorary Award of the Bavarian Prime Minister
- Thomas Heise and Claas Meyer-Heuer in the information category for The Power of the Clans
- Daniel Harrich in the information category for the documentary Spur des Terrors
- Karoline Schuch Best Actress for her role in The Secret of the Dead Forest
- Rainer Bock Best Actor for his roles in Der Überläufer and Das Boot 2
- Franziska Schlotterer in the category Directing for Totgeschwiegen
- Bernd Lange for screenplay Tatort: In der Familie und Der Überläufer
- Felix Cramer in the Camera category for Oktoberfest 1900
- Carolin Kebekus and Shary Reeves in the entertainment category for Brennpunkt Racism
- Nora Kauven in the entertainment category for Showtime of my Life – Stars Against Cancer
- Cristina Trebbi and Jobst Knigge in the culture and education category for The world at a distance – journey through a special year
- Max Uthoff and Claus von Wagner Special Prize (undated) for Die Anstalt
- Klaus Steinbacher Young Talent Award for Oktoberfest 1900

=== 2020 ===
- Carolin Reiber, Honorary Award of the Bavarian Prime Minister
- Aylin Tezel, Best Actress for her role in The Singing Butchers Society
- Felix Klare, Best Actor for his role in Because you belong to me
- Katrin Bühlig, for her screenplay Because you belong to me
- Emma Bading, young talent award for her acting performance in the ARD Movie Play
- Thilo Mischke in the information category for his ProSieben report Germans on the ISIS front
- ZDF for finally a widower
- Christian Klandt for We are now as the best youth series (RTL2)
- BR cooking show Landfrauenküche in the entertainment category
- Sebastian Pufpaff for Pufpaff's Happy Hour in the entertainment category (ZDF)
- Maxine Brückner and Florian Hartung in the culture and education section for childhood under the swastika – 80 years of World War II (VOX)
- Jonas Nay and David Grabowski for Best Score at The Singing Butchers Club
- Friedrich Scherer and Winfried Laasch for One Day in Auschwitz (ZDF)

=== 2019 ===
- Elmar Wepper and Fritz Wepper, honorary award of the Bavarian Prime Minister
- Natalie Spinell Young Talent Award for Servus Baby
- Anna Schudt Best Actress for Departure to Freedom
- Jan Josef Liefers Best Actor for Arthur's Law
- Axel Brüggemann, Culture and education, for moderating the Wagner Festival in Bayreuth
- Sonja Rom, Camera, for Decomposed – A case for Dr. Abel
- Maren Kroymann, Entertainment
- Ulf Röller, Foreign correspondent
- Holger Karsten Schmidt Screenplay for Gladbeck
- Gero von Boehm Producer and Director for Exodus? – A History of the Jews in Europe
- Mark Monheim and Max Eipp Director for Everything Isy
- Astrid Quentell Producer for The Teacher
- Das Boot, Special Prize

=== 2018 ===
- Hape Kerkeling, honorary award of the Bavarian Prime Minister
- Julia Jentsch, best actress in the TV film / series and series category for her role in Das Verschicken (ARD)
- Maximilian Brückner, best actor in the TV film / series and series category for his role in Hindafing (BR)
- Neuesuper GmbH by Simon Amberger, Korbinian Dufter and Rafael Parente, Young Talent Award
- Stefanie Albrecht as an author and reporter for Twisting facts and fake news: Undercover in alternative media (RTL)
- Stephan Lamby as a journalist for his political documentaries Nervous Republic, The duel – Merkel against Schulz and Bimbes – The black coffers of Helmut Kohl (all ARD)
- Claudia Garde in the category television films / series and series as director of the television films Eine gute Mutter (ARD) and Das Nebelhaus (SAT1)
- Christian Schwochow as director of the series Bad Banks (ZDF)
- Robert Löhr as best screenwriter for the series Das Institut (BR, NDR, WDR, Puls, ARD Alpha)
- Thomas Hermanns in the entertainment category as moderator of the entertainment program 25 years of nonsense Comedy Club (Sky)
- Mark Land as Executive Producer of the entertainment program Ninja Warrior Germany (RTL / Norddeich.TV)
- Daniel Harting, Amai Haukamp and Anne Morgan in the culture and education category as authors of the report Mann oder Frau? – Living in the Wrong Body (VOX)
- Babylon Berlin (Sky, ARD Degeto), special price

=== 2017 ===
- Gerhard Polt, honorary award of the Bavarian Prime Minister, he is an expert on the character of the Bavarians
- Sonja Gerhardt, Best Actress in the categories TV Movies / Series and Series for her roles in Jack the Ripper – A woman hunts a murderer (Sat.1) and Ku'damm 56 (ZDF)
- Devid Striesow, Best Actor in the TV Movies / Series and Series categories for his roles in Das weiße Kaninchen (ARD) und Luther and I (ARD)
- Katrin Nemec, young talent award as an author for her graduation film About Loving and Dying as a film student
- Arndt Ginzel and Marcus Weller as authors and reporters of the article Exclusiv im Erste: Spiel im Schatten – Putin's undeclared war against the West (ARD)
- Felix von der Laden, as presenter of Like or Dislike: YouTuber Dner in the US Election Campaign (ZDF)
- Christian Becker, as producer of the film Winnetou (RTL)
- Christian Schwochow as director of the television film The Perpetrators of the ARD trilogy NSU German History X
- Daniela Knapp, as camerawoman of the TV film Luther and I (ARD)
- Martin Eigler, Sönke Lars Neuwohner and Sven S. Poser, as authors of the TV series Morgen hör ich auf (ZDF)
- Matthew Kowalski, as executive producer of the entertainment program: The Voice of Germany (season 6) (ProSieben/SAT.1)
- Carmen Butta and Gabriele Riedle, as authors of the documentary The Secret Revolution – Women in Saudi Arabia (ZDF)
- Lars Friedrich, as the author and director of the documentary Melancholy and Lightness. Dietl's Journey (BR)

=== 2016 ===
- Senta Berger, honorary award from the Bavarian Prime Minister for outstanding achievements in German television
- Tobias Krell, Young Talent Award as a reporter in the documentary Checker Tobi Extra – Why so many people flee (BR/ARD/KIKA)
- Nina Kunzendorf, as best actress in the categories television films / series and series for her role in Nacht der Angst (ZDF)
- Martin Brambach, as best actor in the categories television films / series and series for his roles in Fatal News (NDR/ARD), Unter Verdacht: A Judge (ARTE) and Tatort: In One Shot (MDR/ARD)
- Antonia Rados, as author of the reportage Nachtjournal-special: The IS-Connection (RTL)
- Güner Yasemin Balcı, as author and director of the documentary Der Jungfrauenwahn (ZDF/ARTE)
- Ralf Husmann and Peter Güde, as authors of the film Beware of People (WDR/ARD)
- Richard Huber, as director of the television film Two Lives, One Hope (SAT.1) and the TV series Club der roten Bänder (VOX)
- Bantry Bay Productions Gerda Müller and Jan Kromschröder, as producers of the television series Club der roten Bänder (VOX)
- Olli Dittrich, as author and actor of Schorsch Aigner – The man who was Franz Beckenbauer (ARD)
- Sky sports department, represented by sports director Roman Steuer and commentator Wolf-Christoph Fuss, for the Sky Bundesliga conference – the original (Sky)
- Dietmar Klumpp, as author and director of the report: Fight for peace in the Congo – the largest UN mission in the world (life adventure) (Kabel eins)
- Mike Conway, as author and director of the documentary Nobody is allowed to know – Corinne and her secret (ZDF)

=== 2015 ===
- Jörg Armbruster, honorary award from the Bavarian Prime Minister for outstanding achievements in German television
- Mala Emde, Young Talent Award for her role as Anne Frank in My Daughter Anne Frank (ARD/HR/RBB/WDR)
- Gabriela Sperl, Quirin Berg, Max Wiedemann, Special prize as producer of the three-part series Tannbach (ZDF)
- Angela Andersen and Claus Kleber, as authors of the two-part documentary Hunger! Thirst! (ZDF)
- Philipp Kadelbach, as best director in the category television films / series and series for Naked Among Wolves (ARD/MDR)
- Ferdinand von Schirach and André Georgi, for achievements as a book author and as a screenwriter of the story and the film Volksfest (ZDF)
- Helene Fischer, for The Helene Fischer Show 2014 (ZDF)
- Mario Barth, for Mario Barth reveals! (RTL)
- Patrick Hörl, as director and producer of the documentary Fukushima – Nothing is as it was (BR)
- Eckhart Querner, as author of the documentary Der Sänger Christian Gerhaher (BR)
- Andrea Mocellin and Thomas Muggenthaler, as authors of the documentary Crime Love – by Polish forced laborers and German women (BR)
- Felicitas Woll, as best actress in the categories television films / series and series for her role in The Disobedience (Sat.1)
- Matthias Brandt, as best actor in the categories television films / series and series for his role in A Faithful Husband (ARD / HR)

=== 2014 ===
- Otto Waalkes, honorary award of the Bavarian Prime Minister for his life's work
- Julia Koschitz, Best Actress in the TV Film category for her role in Take Care of Him! (ZDF)
- Kai Wiesinger, best actor in the TV film category for his role in the docudrama The Resignation (Sat.1)
- Gisela Schneeberger, Best Actress in the Series and Series category for her role in The Spin Cycle (BR)
- Alexander Held, best actor in the series and series category for his role in Munich Murder (ZDF)
- Young talent promotion award of the LfA Förderbank Bayern for the producers Lüthje Schneider Hörl Film GbR for their television series Lerchenberg of the ZDF
- Thomas Liesen, as author and producer in the information category for the film Live, love, forget – Alzheimer's at 40 (ARD)
- André Schäfer, as director and producer in the information category for Willy Brandt – Memories of a Politician's Life (ARD/WDR)
- Hilmer Rolff, as a producer in the information category for the miniseries From Spreewaldgurken to FKK – Die DDR privat (n-tv)
- Günter Schütter, as author for the television film Polizeiruf 110: Death makes angels out of us all (ARD/BR)
- Gero Steffen, as cameraman for the television film Tatort: Auf immer Dein (ARD/WDR)
- Friedemann Fromm, as director of Weissensee, 2. Season (ARD)
- Palina Rojinski, Nikeata Thompson and Howard Donald, as a jury on Got to Dance (ProSieben and Sat.1)
- Ralf Blasius, as author and director of the documentary Terra X: Expedition Germany – A journey through 500 million years (ZDF)
- Sylvia Griss and Franz Xaver Karl, as editors of Capriccio (BR)
- Kai Pflaume, as host and discussion partner of the series Show me your world (ARD)

=== 2013 ===
- Ruth Maria Kubitschek, honorary award from the Bavarian Prime Minister for her life's work
- Nadja Uhl as best actress in the television film category for her roles in Operation Sugar (ARD/WDR, BR) and The Tower (ARD/MDR, BR, NDR, WDR, SWR, RBB)
- Robert Atzorn as best actor in the television film category for his role in The Case of Jakob von Metzler (ZDF)
- Caroline Peters as best actress in the series and series category for her role in Mord mit Aussicht – The Venus of Hengasch (ARD)
- Charly Hübner as best actor in the series and series category for his role in Polizeiruf 110 – Fischerkrieg (ARD/NDR)
- Alicia von Rittberg: Young Talent Award of the LfA Förderbank Bayern for her performance as an actress in And all have been silent (ZDF)
- Katharina Schüttler, Miriam Stein, Volker Bruch, Tom Schilling and Ludwig Trepte: Special prize for the ensemble of actors in Generation War (ZDF)
- Guido Knopp as head of the Weltenbrand series (ZDF)
- Frank Rudnick as the author of Innocent in prison – victims of justice and their fight against wrongful convictions (VOX)
- Sebastian Dehnhardt, Manfred Oldenburg and Jobst Knigge as authors and directors of the documentary Drei Leben: Axel Springer (ARTE/ZDF)
- Jochen Alexander Freydank for directing Und weg bist du (SAT.1)
- Rola Bauer as producer for World Without End (SAT.1)
- Christian Lyra and Sebastian Wehlings as Writers of Add a Friend (TNT Series)
- Oliver Welke as moderator of the heute-show (ZDF)
- Arne Kreutzfeldt as Executive Producer of Undercover Boss – Kamps (RTL)
- Denis Scheck as moderator of freshly printed – new books with Denis Scheck (ARD/BR, NDR, WDR, HR)

=== 2012 ===
- Udo Wachtveitl and Miroslav Nemec, honorary award from the Bavarian Prime Minister for their life's work
- Anna Loos, actress, for The Teacher (ZDF)
- Armin Rohde, actor, for going it alone (ARD/BR)
- Anja Kling, actress, for Hannah Mangold & Lucy Palm (SAT.1)
- Matthias Brandt, actor, for Polizeiruf 110 – Because they don't know what they do (ARD/BR)
- Friedrich Ani and Ina Jung, screenwriters, for The Invisible Girl (ZDF/arte)
- Maria von Heland, director, for Die Sterntaler (ARD/SWR)
- Andreas Prochaska, director, for A Day for a Miracle (ZDF)
- Andreas Bareiss and Sven Burgemeister, producers, for Die Rache der Wanderhure (SAT.1)
- Monika Anthes and Edgar Verheyen, Reporter, for Das System Wiesenhof (ARD Exclusiv) ARD/SWAR
- Peter Kloeppel, presenter and author, for September 11 – How one day changed our lives (RTL)
- Birgit Kappel and Sabina Wolf, authors, for The economy in the sights of online criminals (ARD Exclusiv) ARD/BR
- Monika Gruber, Comedian, for The Big Nonsense Variety Show, Monika Gruber live 2011, Grünwald Friday comedy (ProSieben/BR)
- Sylvie van der Vaart and Daniel Hartwich, moderators, for Let's Dance (RTL)
- Harald Lesch, Moderator, for Adventure Research: Drilling or chilling? The way to the super child (ZDF)
- Henryk M. Broder and Hamed Abdel-Samad, moderators, for Either Broder – Die Deutschland-Safari (ARD/HR/BR/SR)
- Young Talent Award of the LfA Förderbank Bayern for Rüdiger Heinze and Stefan Sporbert for Screams of the Forgotten (ProSieben)

=== 2011 ===
- Iris Berben, honorary award of the Bavarian Prime Minister for her life's work
- Antonia Rados, Special Prize for Middle East Reporting (RTL/n-tv)
- Vladimir Burlakov, actor, young talent award for Marco W. – 247 days in Turkish prison (SAT.1)
- Andreas Kuno Richter for his documentary Der Verrat. How the Stasi abused children and young people as spies (RTL/n-tv)
- Mike Lingenfelser and Thomas Kießling, authors of The Biofuels Scandal – Climate Policy in a Dead End (BR)
- Johannes Hano, author of the travel report China's borders (ZDF)
- Max Färberböck, director, for sow number four. A Lower Bavaria thriller (BR)
- Hermine Huntgeburth, director, for Neue Vahr Süd (ARD/WDR/Radio Bremen)
- Dominik Graf, director, for Im Angesicht des Verbrechens (ARD/WDR)
- Stefan Scheich and Robert Dannenberg, authors of Der letzte Bulle (SAT.1)
- Ute Biernat, producer of X Factor (VOX)
- Richard Ladkani and Volker Tittel for The Vatican – The Hidden World (ARD/BR)
- Markus Kavka for the music documentary Number One! – Ozzy Osbourne (Cable 1)
- Andrea Sawatzki as best actress in the TV film category for Bella Vita (ZDF neo)
- Frederick Lau as best actor in the television film category for Neue Vahr Süd
- Lisa Wagner as best actress in the series category for Tatort: Never be free again
- Henning Baum as best actor in the series and series category for Der letzte Bulle

=== 2010 ===
- Klaus Doldinger, honorary award of the Bavarian Prime Minister
- Till Endemann, special prize for directing Flight into the Night – the Accident at Überlingen (ARD)
- Jörg Wontorra for one-two (Sport1)
- Peter Mezger for foreign reporting from Iran (BR/ARD)
- Düzen Tekkal and Jan Rasmus for Extra Special: Fear of the new neighbors (RTL)
- Niki Stein for writing and directing Until Nothing Remains (ARD/SWR)
- Carolin Hecht for the book Alone among students (Sat.1)
- Nina Gummich, Young Talent Award for her role in Alone Among Pupils
- Stefan Raab as initiator and jury president for Our Star for Oslo (ProSieben/ARD)
- Uta von Borries and Stephan Rebelein for 37 degrees – life on the smallest foot (ZDF)
- Thomas Kufus and Volker Heise for 24h Berlin – A day in the life (ARTE/RBB)
- Senta Berger as best actress in the television film category for her role in the film Frau Böhm says no (WDR/ARD)
- Herbert Knaup for best actor in the television film category for his role in the film Thanksgiving
- Annette Frier as best actress in the series and series category for her role in the series Danni Lowinski (Sat.1)
- Florian Martens as best actor in the series and serials category for his role in the crime series Ein starkes Team (ZDF)

=== 2009 ===
- Christoph Süß, Presenter of quer [Across] (ARD/BR)
- Richard C. Schneider, Correspondent of Bayerischer Rundfunk, for Tage des Schreckens [Days of fear] (ARD/BR)
- Roland Suso Richter, Special award for Mogadischu (ARD/BR and SWR)
- Julia von Heinz, Nachwuchsförderpreis (Youth Award) for screenplay and director of Standesgemäß [According to social status] (ARD/BR und SWR)
- Matti Bauer, writer and director of Domspatzen (arte/BR)
- Falko Korth and Thomas Riedel as writers and directors of the documentary Freiheit! Das Ende der DDR [Freedom! The end of the German Democratic Republic] (Sat.1)
- Silke Zertz, writer of Wir sind das Volk [We are the people] (Sat.1)
- Bora Dağtekin for Doctor's Diary (RTL)
- Walter Moers for Die drei Bärchen und der blöde Wolf [The three little bears and the big daft wolf] (ARD/WDR)
- Christian Rach for Rach, der Restaurant-Tester [Rach, the restaurant reviewer] (RTL)
- Dr. Petra Lidschreiber for Ein Jude der Deutschland liebte [A Jew who loved Germany] (ARD/rbb)
- Anja Kling as best actress in the category television film for Wir sind das Volk [We are the people] (Sat.1)
- Ken Duken as best actor in the category television film for A Long Way Home (ARD/SWR)
- Diana Amft as best actress in the category series for Doctor's Diary (RTL)
- Manfred Zapatka as best actor in the category series for KDD – Kriminaldauerdienst [Permanent criminal investigation service] (ZDF)
- Christiane Hörbiger, Bavarian Prime Minister's award for Der Besuch der alten Dame [The visit of the old Lady] (ARD), Zwei Ärzte sind einer zu viel [Two doctors are one more than needed] (ZDF) and for lifetime achievement

=== 2008 ===
- Katharina Wackernagel as Best Actress in the television film category for Contergan (ARD) and Mein Mörder kommt zurück [My murderer returns] (ZDF)
- Edgar Selge as Best Actor in the television film category for Angsthasen [Scaredy-cats] (BR/ARD)
- Alexandra Neldel as Best Actress in the series category for Unschuldig [Innocent] (ProSieben)
- Axel Milberg as Best Actor in the series category for Doktor Martin (ZDF)
- Karsten Scheuren as writer and director of Galileo Special Grab in eisigen Höhen – Bergung aus der Todeszone [A grave in icy heights – rescue from the zone of death] (ProSieben)
- Thomas Präkelt as writer and producer of Der Arbeitsbeschaffer [The job-finder] (RTL)
- Wolf von Lojewski as writer and director of Meine Heimat, Deine Heimat – mit Wolf von Lojewski durch Ostpreußen [My homeland, your homeland – through East Prussia with Wolf von Lojewski] (ZDF)
- Hermine Huntgeburth for directing Teufelsbraten [Hellion] (WDR/NDR/Arte/ARD)
- Detlef Michel as writer of Eine folgenschwere Affäre [An affair with consequences] (ZDF)
- Anke Engelke and Bastian Pastewka for Fröhliche Weihnachten! – mit Wolfgang & Anneliese [Merry Christmas with Wolfgang & Anneliese] (Sat.1)
- Hape Kerkeling for Kerkeling liest – Ich bin dann mal weg [Kerkeling reads – So I'm gone now] (RTL)
- Thomas Weidenbach and Shi Ming as writers, directors, and producers of Chinas Größenwahn am Yangtse [China's megalomania on the Yangtze] (arte/ARD)
- Janina Stopper, Nachwuchsförderpreis (Youth Award) for her supporting role as Mother Anne Kempf in the Tatort episode Kleine Herzen [Little Hearts] (ARD)
- Dieter Kronzucker, Bavarian Prime Minister's award
- Trixter Film GmbH Michael Coldewey and Simone Kraus, special award for the development and implementation of virtual characters in the film The Secret of Loch Ness (Sat.1)

=== 2007 ===
- Rosemarie Fendel as Best Actress for Das zweite Leben [Second Life] (BR/ARD)
- Friedrich von Thun as Best Actor for Helen, Fred und Ted (ARD – BR as coproducer)
- Saskia Vester as Best Actress for KDD – Kriminaldauerdienst (ZDF)
- Christian Ulmen as Best Actor for Dr. Psycho (ProSieben)
- Rosalie Thomass Nachwuchsförderpreis (Youth Award) for her theatrical performances in (among others) Polizeiruf 110: Er sollte tot (ARD)
- Friedemann Fromm for directing, among others, the Tatort episode "Außer Gefecht" [Incapacitated] (BR/ARD)
- Juliane Schuler for the long-term documentary film Marcel – Ein Kämpchen, das wär' schön (BR/ARD)
- Cordula Stratmann in the Comedy category for Schillerstraße [Schiller Street] (Sat.1)
- Daniel Speck for his screenplay for Kiss me Kismet [My crazy Turkish wedding] (ProSieben)
- Holly Fink for cinematography in the miniseries Die Flucht [March of Millions] (ARD)
- Richard Gress, special award for his documentary about the Surma people in Ethiopia: Voxtours: Reise zu den letzten Gladiatoren [Voxtours: journey to the last gladiators] (VOX)
- Ralf Benkö for his reportage about astronaut Thomas Reiter Ein Deutscher im All (RTL)
- Manfred Oldenburg for his sports documentary Das verflixte dritte Tor – Wembley '66 – Die wahre Geschichte [That damn third goal – Wembley '66 – The true story] (ZDF)
- Bayerischer Rundfunk, special award for the charity event Sternstunden [Magic Moments]
- Frank Elstner, Bavarian Prime Minister's award

=== 2006 ===
- Heike Makatsch as actress in the area of television plays for Margarete Steiff
- Matthias Brandt as actor in the area of television plays for In Sachen Kaminski [Concerning Kaminski]
- Jutta Speidel as best actress in a serial for Um Himmels Willen [For Heaven's sake]
- Fritz Wepper as best actor in a serial for Um Himmels Willen
- Felicitas Woll Youth Award for her performance in the TV film Dresden
- Beate Langmaack for a screenplay of Polizeiruf 110 episode Vorwärts wie rückwärts [Forwards like backwards]
- Frank Plasberg in the field of information for his moderation of the political program Hart aber fair [Hard but fair]
- Matti Geschonneck for directing the television films The News and Silver Wedding
- Frank-Markus Barwasser (also known as Erwin Pelzig) and the BR show Aufgemerkt! Pelzig unterhält sich [Attention! Pelzig chats] in the field of entertainment
- Nico Hofmann, special award for Dresden, Die Luftbrücke [The Airlift] and Die Sturmflut [Storm Tide]
- Joachim Lang for the children's show Tigerenten Club (ARD)
- Klaus Feichtenberger for book and direction of ZDF series Expedition – der Kontinent [Expedition – the continent]
- Lisa Eder and Thomas Wartmann for book and direction of the documentary Jenseits von Samarkand – eine usbekische Liebesgeschichte [Beyond Samarkand – an Usbek love story] (SWR/arte)
- Jürgen Ast and Daniel Ast for the documentary Abrechnung mit Stalin – das Jahr 1956 [Settling the score with Stalin – the year 1956] (Arte/RBB)
- Jens Kemper and Mark Brauckmann for the RTL documentary Mein Chef der Bundeskanzler – Ludwig Erhard aus der Nähe und in Farbe [My boss the chancellor – Ludwig Erhard close-ups in colour]
- Hannelore Elsner, Bavarian Prime Minister's award

=== 2005 ===
- Ulrike Kriener for her performance as an actress in Kommissarin Lucas – Vergangene Sünden [Commissioner Lucas – Sins of the past] and Kommissarin Lucas – Vertrauen bis zuletzt [Trust until the end] (ZDF)
- Ulrich Mühe und Gregor Edelmann for the script and acting performance in Der letzte Zeuge (ZDF)
- Heike Richter-Karst for producing of the Polizeiruf 110 episodes "Winterende" [End of the winter] and "Dumm wie Brot" [Thick as a brick] (NDR/ARD)
- Franz Xaver Bogner for book and direction of the series München 7 (BR)
- Christoph Maria Herbst for his acting performance in the entertainment series Stromberg (Pro7)
- Isabel Kleefeld for directing the television film Das Gespenst von Canterville [The ghost of Canterville] (Sat.1)
- Bastian Pastewka for his performance as an actor in the broadcast Ohne Worte [Wordless] (RTL)
- Sebastian Koch for his acting performance in the television film Speer und Er (Speer and Him) (WDR/NDR/BR/ARD/ORF)
- Andrea Morgenthaler for the documentary Joseph Goebbels (SWR/WDR/ARD)
- Dan Setton and Helmar Büchel for directing the report In Gottes Namen – Die Rekruten des Heiligen Krieges [In the name of God – the recruits of the Holy War] (Spiegel TV/RTL)
- Theo Koll for presenting the broadcast Frontal 21 (ZDF), as a proxy for the entire editorial staff
- Rainer Kaufmann for directing the television films Queen of Cherries (ZDF) and Marias's Last Journey (BR/ARD)
- Evita Bauer for book and direction of Lena Christ – Heimat und Sehnsucht [Lena Christ – homeland and longing] (BR)
- Monica Bleibtreu, Nina Kunzendorf and Michael Fitz, special award for their acting performances in the television film Marias's Last Journey (BR/ARD)
- Joachim Fuchsberger, Bavarian Prime Minister's award

=== 2004 ===
- Kaspar Heidelbach and Götz Weidner for the television film A Light in Dark Places [Das Wunder von Lengede] (Sat.1)
- Axel Stäck for the script of the television film Prince Charming (ProSieben)
- Dagmar Manzel for the television film Leben wäre schön [Life would be nice] (BR/ARD)
- Veronica Ferres for the television films Annas Heimkehr [Anna's returning home] (BR/ARD), Für immer verloren [Lost forever] (Sat.1) and Stärker als der Tod [Stronger than death] (ZDF)
- Tobias Moretti for the television film Swabian Children (BR/SWR/ARD/Arte/ORF/SF DRS)
- Wolfgang Stumph for the TV series Stubbe – Von Fall zu Fall [Stubbe – From case to case] (ZDF)
- Marc Conrad and Friedrich Wildfeuer for the TV series Abschnitt 40 (RTL)
- Heidi Umbreit and Bernd Umbreit for the documentary "Sam und Tim – geboren an der Grenze des Lebens" [Sam and Tim – born at the edge of life] from the series Menschen hautnah [Close to people] (WDR/ARD)
- Meinhard Prill for the episode "Von Himmel und Erde – Alltag im Kloster Landshut-Seligenthal" [On Heaven and Earth – Life in the Landshut-Seligenthal monastery] from the series Irgendwo in Bayern [Somewhere in Bavaria] (BFS) and "Kulisse für alle Zeiten – der Stadtplatz von Eggenfelden" [A scenery for eternity – the town square of Eggenfelden] from the program series Unter unserem Himmel [Under our skies] (BFS)
- Dominique Klughammer for the film Jung, erfolgreich – arbeitslos [Young, successful… unemployed] from the program series 37° (ZDF)
- Danuta Harrich-Zandberg and Walter Harrich for the documentary Der Contergan-Skandal [The contergan row] (NDR/ARD)
- Hape Kerkeling for the entertainment program Die 70er Show [The 70's show] (RTL)
- Artem Demenok and Andreas Christoph Schmidt, special award for the documentary Helden ohne Ruhm – der 17. Juni 1953 [Heroes without glory – 17 June 1953] (RBB/ARD/Arte)
- Ruth Drexel, Special award for lifetime achievement
- Harry Valérien Bavarian Prime Minister's award

=== 2003 ===
- Anke Engelke and Olli Dittrich for Blind Date – Taxi nach Schweinau (ZDF)
- Götz George and Klaus J. Behrendt for Mein Vater [My father] (WDR/ARD)
- Matti Geschonneck for Die Mutter [The mother] (WDR/ARD)
- Hannelore Hoger for the Bella Block episode "Tödliche Nähe" [Fatal closeness] (ZDF)
- Maybrit Illner for the Berlin Mitte political magazine (ZDF)
- Rebecca Immanuel and Christoph M. Ohrt for the Edel & Starck series (Sat.1)
- Max Thomas Mehr for the screenplay of "Sebnitz – die perfekte Story" [Sebnitz – the perfect story] from the series Ein Tag mit Folgen [A day with consequences] (arte)
- Jan Mojto for producing Napoléon (ZDF)
- Jochen Richter for Landschaften der Erde [Landscapes of the Earth] (BR/ARD)
- Anneke Kim Sarnau for Final Hope (NDR/ARD)
- Britta Stöckle for the screenplay for Geht nicht, gibt’s nicht [lit.: 'It won't work', doesn't work.] (ZDF)
- Hilmar Thate for Operation Rubikon (ProSieben)
- Willi Weitzel for Willi will's wissen (BR/WDR/KI.KA)
- Andre Zalbertus and Peter Kloeppel for Kanzler, Krisen, Koalitionen [Chancellors, crises, coalitions] (RTL)
- Special award for Horst Tappert in Derrick (ZDF)
- Special award for the editors of 50 years of Tagesschau (ARD)
- Helmut Dietl, Bavarian Prime Minister's award

=== 2002 ===
- Pablo Bach and Jens Klüber for Revenge of the Rats (ProSieben)
- Heinz Baumann for Adelheid und ihre Mörder (NDR/ARD)
- Rainer Berg and Peter Keglevic for Dance with the Devil (Sat.1)
- Monica Bleibtreu, Veronica Ferres, Jürgen Hentsch, Sebastian Koch, Armin Mueller-Stahl and Sophie Rois for Die Manns – Ein Jahrhundertroman [The Mann family – a novel of the century]
- Peter Dudzik for reporting from the Middle East (BR/ARD)
- Gisela Graichen as the author of the archaeology series Schliemanns Erben Schliemann's heirs (ZDF)
- Mariele Millowitsch for the serie Nikola (RTL)
- Jens Niehuss for "Einsatz für den Flugzeugträger: Leben auf der USS-Roosevelt" [A mission for the aircraft carrier: Life on USS Roosevelt] (ProSieben)
- Werner Reuß as editorial chief of BR-alpha
- Charlotte Roche for Fast Forward (VIVA)
- Jens Schanze and Börres Weiffenbach for the documentary Otzenrather Sprung [The Otzenrath jump] (ZDF/3Sat)
- Dieter Thoma and Volker Weicker for Skispringen: Vierschanzentournee [Ski jumping: Four Hills Tournament] (RTL)
- Special award for Heinrich Breloer and Horst Königstein in Die Manns – Ein Jahrhundertroman
- Vicco von Bülow, Bavarian Prime Minister's award

=== 2001 ===
- Aiman Abdallah and Susanne Wiesner for the popular science series Galileo (ProSieben)
- Hans-Christoph Blumenberg and Ulrich Lenze for the television film Deutschlandspiel [The Germany Game] (ZDF/Arte)
- Sebastian Dehnhardt, Christian Frey and Meinhard Prill for Die Vertriebenen – Hitlers letzte Opfer [The displaced – Hitler's last victims] (MDR/NDR/ARD)
- Heino Ferch and Roland Suso Richter for the television film The Tunnel (Sat.1)
- Vivian Naefe, Miroslav Nemec and Udo Wachtveitl for Tatort (BR/ARD)
- Christiane Hörbiger for the soap Julia – Eine ungewöhnliche Frau [Julia – an extraordinary lady] (SR/ARD/ORF)
- Christian Jeltsch for Einer geht noch [One for the road!] (BR/SWR/arte) und Rote Glut [Red heat] (ZDF/Arte)
- Peter Schönhofer and Thomas Grimm for Faust – der Tragödie erster und zweiter Teil Faust– acts 1 and 2 (ZDF/Arte/3sat/ZDF-Theaterkanal)
- Sandra Maischberger for her political talk show Maischberger (n-tv)
- Gert Scobel for Kulturzeit [Culture time] (3sat)
- Michael Mandlik for reporting from Rome and Vatican City (BR/ARD)
- Günther Jauch, Bavarian Prime Minister's award

=== 2000 ===
- Martina Gedeck for acting performance in Deine besten Jahre [Your best years] (Arte/ZDF)
- Bernd Grote for the series 2000 Jahre Christentum [2000 years of Christendom]
- Bernadette Heerwagen for Der Schandfleck [The eyesore]
- Hans-Hermann Hertle and Gunther Scholz as directors of Als die Mauer fiel. 50 Stunden, die die Welt veränderten [When the Berlin Wall fell. 50 hours that changed the world] (SFB)
- Janusch Kozminski and Richard Chaim Schneider as producer of Wir sind da! – Juden in Deutschland nach 1945 [We're there! Jews in Germany after 1945] (WDR/BR)
- Jan-Josef Liefers for directing and acting performance in Jack’s Baby
- Peter Lohmeyer for acting performance in Der Elefant in meinem Bett [The elephant in my bed]
- Hans Werner Meyer for acting performance in Und morgen geht die Sonne wieder auf [And tomorrow the sun will rise again] and Die Cleveren [The smart ones] (RTL)
- Christine Neubauer for acting performance in Frische Ware [Fresh goods] (BR)
- Elmar Paulke for the documentary Boris Becker – I did it my way (DSF)
- Julian Pölsler, Hans-Michael Rehberg and Bernadette Heerwagen, special award for directing Der Schandfleck (BR/ARD)
- Antje Schmidt for the TV films Und morgen geht die Sonne wieder auf (RTL) and Der Elefant in meinem Bett (ProSieben)
- Hartmut Schoen for the TV film Waiting Means Death (ZDF)
- Walter Flemmer, Bavarian Prime Minister's award

=== 1999 ===
- Bayerischer Rundfunk for the ARD network reporting on the Kosovo War (Dr. Gerhard Fuchs and Sigmund Gottlieb as proxies)
- Thomas Berger and Barbara Jago for the script to Busenfreunde 2 – Alles wird gut [Bosom Buddies 2 – It's going to be alright]
- Suzanne von Borsody for Days of Darkness (WDR) and Die Mörderin [The murderess] (ZDF)
- Axel Engstfeld for Im Bannkreis des Nordens – Labyrinth des Todes [Under the spell of the North – Labyrinth of death]
- Oliver Hirschbiegel for Todfeinde – Die falsche Entscheidung [Sworn enemies – The wrong decision]
- Dariusz Jablonski for Der Fotograf [The photographer]
- Kathi Leitner für Einmal leben [Living for once]
- Jan Peter for the episode "Drei Tage im August" [Three days in August] from the History series (ZDF)
- Dieter Pfaff for the episode "Sperling und der brennende Arm" [Sperling and the burning arm] from the Sperling police series
- Harald Schmidt for Die Harald Schmidt Show (Sat.1)
- Dror Zahavi for the episode "Die Todfreundin" [lit: the deadly girlfriend] from the series Doppelter Einsatz
- Jo Baier, special award for the television play Der Laden [The store] after the novel by Erwin Strittmatter
- Thomas Gottschalk, Bavarian Prime Minister's award

=== 1998 ===
- Friedhelm Brebeck for his reports on the various crises in the former Yugoslavia
- Karoline Eichhorn for the TV film Daybreak
- Heiner Gatzemaier, Ingeborg Jacobs and Hartmut Seifert for the documentary series OP – Schicksale im Klinikum [OP – Fate and fortunate in the clinic]
- Hans Grimmelmann for the TV film Blind Date – Flirt mit Folgen [Blind Date – a fateful flirt]
- Paul Hengge for the TV film Das Urteil [The verdict]
- Günther Jauch and Marcel Reif for presenting the 1997–98 UEFA Champions League semi finals football game Real Madrid C.F. vs Borussia Dortmund
- Heiner Lauterbach for the TV films The Scorpion and Opernball [Opera Ball]
- Klaus Löwitsch for the TV film Das Urteil [The verdict]
- Franka Potente for the TV film Opernball [Opera Ball]
- Roland Suso Richter for the TV film The Bubi Scholz Story
- Nina Steinhauser for Tötet die Hure – Der Fall Maria Stuart [Kill the whore – the case of Mary, Queen of Scots]
- Dominik Graf special award for the TV films The Scorpion, Dr. Knock and Das Wispern im Berg der Dinge [The whispering inside the mountain of things]
- Peter Ustinov, Bavarian Prime Minister's award

=== 1997 ===
- Percy Adlon for directing Hotel Adlon (BR/Arte)
- Heinrich Breloer special award for the TV film Death Game
- Markus Fischötter and Andre Zalbertus for Einmal Hölle und zurück [Return ticket to hell]
- Evelyn Hamann for acting performance in Adelheid und ihre Mörder (ARD)
- Corinna Harfouch for acting performance in Der Ausbruch [The prison break] and Gefährliche Freundin [Dangerous girlfriend]
- Guido Knopp for the documentary series Hitlers Helfer [Hitler's helpers] (ZDF)
- Antje-Katrin Kühnemann for presenting the medical series Die Sprechstunde [The consultation] (BR)
- Rainer Laux for editing Leben im Ghetto [Life in the Ghetto]
- Ulrich Noethen for acting performance in Der Ausbruch [The prison break] and Busenfreunde [Bosom buddies]
- Johannes Reben as the author of Bruder Esel [Brother Donkey]
- Gernot Roll as cinematographer for Refuge (Unter die Haut) and A Girl Called Rosemary
- Christoph Waltz for acting performance in You Are Not Alone: The Roy Black Story
- Peter Welz for Viel Spaß mit meiner Frau [Have fun with my wife]
- Eduard Zimmermann, Bavarian Prime Minister's award

=== 1996 ===
- Mario Adorf, Günter Strack and Heinz Hoenig for the TV film The Shadow Man (ZDF)
- Jo Baier for the comedy Der schönste Tag im Leben [The best day in your life] (ZDF)
- Monika Baumgartner, Bettina Kupfer and Kathrin Waligura for the TV films Sau sticht [lit. (the) sow jabs], Das Wunschkind, Für alle Fälle Stefanie (ZDF)
- Michael von Dessauer for the series Welt der Wunder [World of Miracles] (Pro Sieben)
- Andrzej Falber and Ekkehard Kuhn for the documentary film Schlesien – Brücke in Europa Silesia – a bridge in Europe (ZDF)
- Christel Hinrichsen for the documentary series Lebenslinien [Life lines] (BR)
- Nico Hofmann for directing the action series Der Sandmann [The Sandman] (RTL2)
- Peter Kloeppel for the news series RTL aktuell (RTL)
- Siegfried Lowitz, special award for acting performance
- Erni Singerl, special award for acting performance
- Lorin Maazel, Bavarian Prime Minister's award

=== 1995 ===
- Gerd Anthoff for acting performance in Über Kreuz (BR/ARD)
- Wolf Bachofner, Karl Markovics and Tobias Moretti for the police series Inspector Rex (Sat.1)
- Reinhold Beckmann for the football magazine Ran – Sat.1 Bundesliga (Sat.1)
- Cornelia Froboess for acting performance in Judgment Day (RTL)
- Martina Gedeck for acting performance in Hölleisengretl (ZDF)
- Max Grießer, Thomas Hackenberg, April Hailer, Geert Müller-Gerbes and Lutz Reichart for the series Wie bitte? [Excuse me?] (RTL)
- Armin Maiwald for the episode "Nachkriegsmaus" [Post-war Mouse] from the children's series Die Sendung mit der Maus (WDR/ARD)
- Imo Moskowicz for directing Über Kreuz [Across] (BR/ARD)
- Christian Rischert for the portrait of the city of Vienna, Wiener Lust [Viennese lust] (BR/ARD)
- Andreas Christoph Schmidt for the documentary film Festung Berlin – Der Untergang der Reichshauptstadt [Fortress Berlin – The downfall of the Reich's capital] (SFB/ARD)
- Oliver Storz, special award for the television film Three Days in April (SDR/ARD/Arte)
- Uschi Glas, Bavarian Prime Minister's award

=== 1994 ===
- Wigald Boning, Olli Dittrich, Stefan Jürgens, Mirco Nontschew, Tanja Schumann, Esther Schweins and Hugo Egon Balder as of the comedy show RTL Samstag Nacht (RTL)
- Joachim Bublath for the series Abenteuer Forschung [The adventure of research] and Die Knoff-Hoff-Show [The 'knoff-hoff' show (a pun on the English "know-how")] (ZDF)
- Max Färberböck for the TV films Einer zahlt immer [There's always one who's got to pay] and Bella Block (ZDF)
- Wolf Gaudlitz for the documentary Gezählte Tage [Numbered days] (Radio Bremen/ARD)
- Arabella Kiesbauer for the talk show Arabella (ProSieben)
- Jennifer Nitsch for the series Nur eine kleine Affäre [Only a small affair] (ZDF)
- Udo Samel for the TV film Durchreise [Transit] (ZDF)
- Thekla Carola Wied for the television play Ich klage an [I accuse] (Sat.1)
- Henric L. Wuermeling, special award for the documentary Netzwerk [Network] (BR/ARD)
- Gerd Ruge, special award for his reports as ARD correspondent in Moscow
- Willy Millowitsch, Bavarian Prime Minister's award

=== 1993 ===
- Ingo Bethke und Ulrich Brochhagen for the TV film Pulverfaß Provinz. Der 17. Juni 1953 im Bezirk Halle [The provincial tinderbox – the 17 June 2953 in the Halle district] (MDR)
- Gero von Boehm for the TV film Schöpfer Mensch [Creator Man] (SWF)
- Franz Xaver Bogner for the TV film Madame Bäurin [Madame farmer] (BR)
- Harald Juhnke for the TV film The Parrot (BR)
- Leslie Malton and Dieter Wedel for the TV film The Great Bellheim (ZDF)
- Linda de Mol for the series Traumhochzeit [Wedding of your dreams] (RTL)
- Otto Schenk for the TV films Duett (WDR/ORF) and Die Sternstunde des Josef Bieder [Josef Bieder's moment of glory] (SDR/ORF)
- Karl Heinz Willschrei for "Poker" from the detective series Wolffs Revier [Wolff's precinct] (Sat.1)
- Herbert Reinecker, Bavarian Prime Minister's award

=== 1992 ===
- Jürgen Bretzinger and Susanne Schneider for the TV film Fremde liebe Fremde [Stranger, dear stranger] (BR)
- Sabine Christiansen for the news program Tagesthemen (ARD)
- Maxim Dessau for the portrait Ugorski, denn seinen Freunden gibt er's schlafend [Ugorski – for he gives to his friends when they sleep] (ZDF)
- Christian Frey and Heiner Sylvester for the TV film Clara Mosch oder die schöpferische Zersetzung [Clara Mosch, or the creative disintegration] (MDR)
- Götz George and Hajo Gies for the Tatort TV episode Der Fall Schimanski [The Schimanski case] (WDR)
- Detlev Kleinert for the report Die Hölle von Sarajewo [The hell of Sarajevo] (BR)
- Roger Willemsen for the talk show 0137 (Premiere)
- Rudolf Mühlfenzl, honorary award
- Hans Christian Blech, Bavarian Prime Minister's award

=== 1991 ===
- Ernst Arendt and Hans Schweiger for the TV film "Lied der Landschaft" [Song of the landscape] from the series "Tiere vor der Kamera" [lit.: animals in front of the camera] (BR)
- Erich Böhme for the talk show Talk im Turm [Talk in the tower] (Sat.1)
- Heinrich Breloer and Georg M. Hafner for the television play Kollege Otto – Die Coop-Affäre [Colleague Otto – the co op affair] (WDR)
- Hellmuth Karasek, Sigrid Löffler and Marcel Reich-Ranicki for the series Das literarische Quartett [The literary Quartet] (ZDF)
- Hape Kerkeling for the program Total Normal [Totally normal] (Radio Bremen)
- Employees of the correspondent posts of ARD and ZDF in East Berlin
- Willy Purucker for the series Löwengrube [The lion's den] (BR)
- Peter Scholl-Latour for the documentary series Das Schwert des Islam [The sword of Islam]
- Sönke Wortmann, for the television film A Crazy Couple (ZDF)

=== 1990 ===
- Jo Baier for the television film "Rosse" (BR)
- Jurek Becker, Manfred Krug and Werner Masten for the series Liebling Kreuzberg (SFB/NDR/WDR)
- Karin Brandauer for the TV films Marleneken [dialect for 'Little Marlene'] (ZDF) and Verkaufte Heimat [Sold homeland] (ORF/NDR)
- Nikolaus Brender and Georg M. Hafner for the report El Expectador – Der Tod schreibt mit [El Expectador – Death is taking notes] (WDR)
- Eva Mieke for the TV film Marleneken (ZDF)
- Günter Rohrbach for the series Rote Erde [Red soil] (WDR)
- Hartmut Schoen for the documentary Kälte, Mord und Perestroika [Cold, murder, and Perestroika] (ZDF)
- Dieter Wieland for the series Topographie [Topography] (BR)
- Peter von Zahn, Bavarian Prime Minister's award

=== 1989 ===
- Fritz Egner for the show Dingsda [lit.: 'thingy'] (BR)
- Marianne Hoppe for the television play Bei Thea [At Thea's] (ZDF)
- Günther Jauch for the series Menschen [People], Na siehste [lit.: Look (I told you)] and Das aktuelle Sportstudio (ZDF)
- Franz Peter Wirth for Die unruhige Nacht [Restless night] and Ein Stück Himmel [A Square of Sky]
- Henric L. Wuermeling for the TV series August '39 – Elf Tage zwischen Frieden und Krieg [August '39 – Eleven days between peace and war] (ARD)
- Dana Vávrová and Werner Stocker for Herbstmilch [Autumn Milk]
- Rüdiger Proske for the TV series Mitten in Europa – Deutsche Geschichte [In the heart of Europe – History of Germany] (Sat.1)
- Helmut Ringelmann, Bavarian Prime Minister's award
