= Gero von Boehm =

German journalist (born 1954)

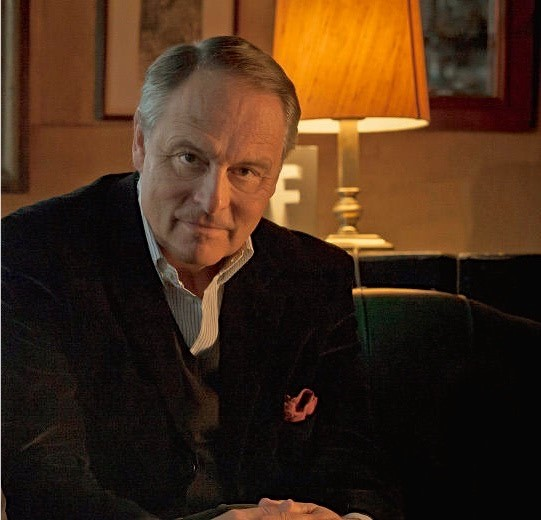
- von Boehm in 2016
- Born: 20 April 1954 (age 72); Hanover, Nether saxony, West Germany
- Occupations: Director, journalist and television presenter

Gero von Boehm (born 20 April 1954 in Hanover; full name Kurt-Gero von Boehm-Bezing) is a German director, journalist and television presenter.

== Life ==
Gero von Boehm grew up in Heidelberg and studied law and social studies at the Heidelberg University and in New York City. When he was 20 years old he started writing articles for the weekly paper Die Zeit and others. Later he had been working for the radio station of the Westdeutscher Rundfunk, the Südwestfunk and the Deutschlandfunk. He filmed his first documentary for television in 1975. In 1978 he founded the film production company interscience film along with his wife Christiane, who is in charge of finances, production and administration.

In addition to his television projects Gero von Boehm kept interviewing great personalities for his series Wortwechsel for Südwestfunk. Among them were the actress Lilli Palmer (1985), the historian Golo Mann (1989) and banker Alfred Herrhausen (1989). From 2002 to 2010 he presented the show Gero von Boehm meets... on German broadcaster 3sat. In 2011 he founded the film production company LUPA Film.

Gero von Boehm has three children and lives in Berlin and France.

== Filmography ==
More than 100 documentaries for ARD, ZDF, ARTE, France 3, RAI, Sundance Channel (selection):

- 1982: Henry Moore – Begegnung zwischen Licht und Stein
- 1982: Schöpfer Mensch – Auf den Spuren der Kreativität
- 1983: Armut in Amerika
- 1985: Tatort: Der Mord danach
- 1986: Portrait Arthur Miller
- 1986: Die Friedenskinder von Belfast
- 1987: Chimären
- 1987: Die Bernstorff-Chronik
- 1987: Das Haus am Ende des Tunnels
- 1988: Die Streetkids von New York
- 1988: Henri Matisse – Die Jahre in Nizza
- 1989: Quarantäne
- 1989: Portrait Golo Mann
- 1990: Der letzte Traum
- 1990: 2-part WDR-series: Philosophie heute: Boulevard der Denker
- 1990: Portrait Marcel Reich-Ranicki
- 1992: Der achte Tag der Schöpfung
- 1992: Die Gendoktoren
- 1992: 4-part ZDF-series: Im Gegenlicht – eine italienische Reise (with Joachim Fest)
- 1992: 2-part WDR-series: Philosophie heute: Avenue der Denker
- 1993: Schöpfer Mensch – Forscherstars greifen nach den Sternen
- 1993: Tanz mit dem Vulkan – Portrait Susan Sontag
- 1993: Blut-Verwandtschaften – Mafia, Morde und Milliarden
- 1993: Zeugen des Jahrhunderts: Jeanne Hersch
- 1994: 2-part ZDF-series: Menschen, Triebe, Sensationen
- 1994: Der Tod in Hollywood
- 1994: Faust III – Auf dem Weg zum künstlichen Leben
- 1994/1995: Portrait Umberto Eco
- 1994/1995: Ein abenteuerliches Herz – Portrait zum 100. Geburtstag Ernst Jüngers
- 1995: Der Junge mit der roten Mütze – Pierre Matisse – ein Leben in Bildern
- 1995: Documentary Trilogy for ZDF: Der Killer-Faktor
- 1996: David Hockney – Augenlust
- 1996: Balthus – Geheimnisse eines Malers
- 1997: Kurt Masur – The Portrait
- 1997: Zeugen des Jahrhunderts: Gregor von Rezzori
- 1997: 5-part ZDF-series Odyssee 3000 – Gero von Boehm berichtet
- 1998: 5-part sequel of the ZDF-series Odyssee 3000 – Gero von Boehm berichtet
- 1998: Mandarin der Moderne – Der Architekt I.M. Pei
- 1999: „Glücklich bin ich nie...“ – Augenblicke im Leben des Karl Lagerfeld
- 1999: Geheimakte G. – Goethe's wahre italienische Reise
- 1999: Sphinx: Casanova – Magier der Leidenschaften
- 1999: Bruder der Unberührbaren – Pierre Ceyrac, ein Leben in Indien
- 2000: Mord am Canal Grande: Donna Leon und Venedig
- 2000: Hamlet in Hollywood – Die Welten des Maximilian Schell
- 2000: „Ich sag’ nicht ja, ich sag’ nicht nein“: Zarah Leander
- 2001: Die Menschheitsformel – Auf der Suche nach dem letzten Geheimnis
- 2001: ZDF-series: Die großen Clans – Glanz und Drama berühmter Familien
1. Kennedy & Agnelli
2. Rothschild & Spencer
3. Porsche, Bismarck & Benetton
- 2001: Das letzte Geheimnis von Pompei
- 2001: Der Mann, der durchs Feuer ging: Alberto Giacometti, ein Leben
- 2001: Isabella Rossellini – My Life
- 2001: Menschenfresser, Menschenfreund – Gero von Boehm meets Georg Stefan Troller
- 2002: Albert Speer – My Life
- 2002: J-C de Castelbajac – My Life
- 2002: Stadt aus Glas – Paul Auster in New York
- 2002: Helmut Newton – My Life
- 2003: Diva der Macht – Wer war Jacqueline Kennedy Onassis?
- 2003: Harry Belafonte – My Life
- 2004: Audrey Hepburn – Ein Star auf der Suche
- 2004: ZDF/ARTE-series: Palaces of Power:
1. The Vatican
2. The Kremlin
3. The White House
4. The Elysée Palace
5. The Buckingham Palace
- 2004: Armin Mueller-Stahl – My Life
- 2004: Magier des Lichts – Der Architekt Richard Meier
- 2005: Blanca Li – My Life
- 2005: Bettina Rheims – My Life
- 2005: Georg Stefan Troller – My Life
- 2002 to 2010: Gero von Boehm meets…
- 2006: Karol Wojtyła – Geheimnisse eines Papstes (leading parts: Michael Mendl and Mario Adorf)
- 2007: Giants: Ludwig van Beethoven (leading part: Uwe Ochsenknecht)
- 2007: Giants: Alexander von Humboldt (leading parts: Matthias Habich and Nikolai Kinski)
- 2007: Giants: Albert Einstein (leading part: Maximilian Schell)
- 2007: ZDF-series: Paläste der Macht – Herrscher des Orients
- 2007: André Glucksmann – My Life
- 2008: with Peter Scholl-Latour. ZDF-series: Between the Frontlines
- 2008: ZDF-series: A Night in November
- 2008: Die Tryptichen des Zao Wou-Ki
- 2008: Alexandra Maria Lara – My Life
- 2009: 2-part ZDF-series: Kreml, Kaviar und Milliarden
- 2009: Paris – Berlin, the Debate
- 2009: Michael Haneke – My Life
- 2010: Isabella Rossellini – Aus dem Leben eines Schmetterlings
- 2010: Erika Pluhar – My Life
- 2011: Bitte stören – Martin Walser and Thea Dorn
- 2011: Bitte stören – Hans Magnus Enzensberger and Thea Dorn
- 2011: Close Up – Veruschka, Vera Gräfin Lehndorff
- 2011: 6-part ZDF-series: Terra X: A Short History of the World - with Hape Kerkeling
- 2011 to 2012: 5-part series: Castles and Palaces of Europe (with Jeremy JP Fekete)
1. Loire Valley in France Gero von Boehm
2. Baden-Württemberg in Germany Jeremy J.P. Fekete
3. Southern England and The Midlands Gero von Boehm
4. Piedmont in Italy Jeremy J.P. Fekete
5. Estremadura in Portugal Jeremy J.P. Fekete
- since 2012: Precht
- 2012: Das Adlon - Die Dokumentation
- 2013: Der Clan - Die Dokumentation
- 2014: Auf Leben und Tod - Peter Scholl-Latour wird 90.
- since 2014: Zeugen des Jahrhunderts
- 2014: Germany's Creative Spirits - Karl Lagerfeld
- 2014/2015: 6-part ZDF-series: Terra X: The German Saga - With Christopher Clark
- 2014: Hape Kerkeling - Keine Geburtstagsshow!
- 2015: 7-part talk show: Close Up - Gero von Boehm asks
- 2015: Auf den Spuren der Einheit – With Christopher Clark
- 2015: Germany's Creative Spirits - Peter Lindbergh
- 2016: 2-part ZDF-series: Terra X: Australia Saga - With Christopher Clark
- 2017: Henry Miller – Prophet of Desire
- 2017: ′′Germany's Creative spirits - Claus Peymann′′
- 2017: 6-Part-Documentary ZDF: Terra X: The Europe Saga with Christopher Clark
- 2018: 2-Part-Documentary ZDF: TerraX: Exodus? A History of the Jews in Europe
- 2020: Planet of Treasures - A History of Mankind. Along the Line of UNESCO World Heritage
- 2020: Helmut Newton – The Bad and the Beautiful

== Books ==
- Odyssee 3000 – Reisen in die Zukunft, Munich: C. Bertelsmann, 1998, ISBN 3-570-00268-3.
- Das Haus des Malers. Balthus im Grand Chalet, Fotografien von Kishin Shinoyama. Mit einem Vorwort von Gero von Boehm. Munich: Schirmer/Mosel, 2000, ISBN 3-88814-618-6.
- Conversations with I.M. Pei. Light is the Key, Munich: Prestel, 2000, ISBN 3-7913-2176-5.
- Mythos Kennedy, Munich: Collection Rolf Heyne, 2003, ISBN 3-89910-214-2.
- Wer war Albert Einstein? E=mc², Munich: Collection Rolf Heyne, 2005, ISBN 3-89910-251-7.
- Unterwegs in der Weltgeschichte – mit Hape Kerkeling. Hörbuch. Munich: Random House, 2011, ISBN 978-3-8371-0773-9.
- Begegnungen. Menschenbilder aus drei Jahrzehnten, Munich: Collection Rolf Heyne, 2012, ISBN 978-3-89910-443-1.
- Nahaufnahmen. Fünfzig Gespräche mit dem Leben, Berlin: Propyläen Verlag, 2016, ISBN 978-3-549-07476-3.

== Awards ==
- 1980 Wilhelmine-Lübke-Preis
- 1991 Television Award by Hartmannbund
- 1993 Bavarian TV Award
- 1993 Award by the Eduard Rhein Foundation (with Ernst Waldemar Bauer)
- 2016 Bert-Donnepp-Award
- 2017 Steiger Award
- 2019 Bavarian TV Award in the category culture and education as producer and director for Exodus? A history of the Jews in Europe
- Chevalier des Arts et Lettres of the French Republic

Gero von Boehm is a member of the International Academy of Television Arts & Sciences in New York.
