= Albrecht Knaus Verlag =

Coordinates: 48.1319°N 11.6217°E

- Founded: 1978; 48 years ago
- Defunct: 2018
- Country of origin: Germany
- Headquarters location: Munich
- Fiction genres: Fiction, non-fiction
- Official website: www.knaus-verlag.de

The Albrecht Knaus Verlag (also Knaus Verlag, the company's preferred spelling is KNAUS) is a German publisher of fiction and nonfiction based in Munich. It was founded in 1978 and is now part of the Random House publishing group. The publisher became known mainly through the works of Walter Kempowski.

== History ==
Albrecht Knaus was editor at Piper Verlag and publishing director at Hoffmann und Campe. In 1978 he founded, under his name, the Albrecht Knaus Verlag in Hamburg. The publishing house was registered on 18 January 1978 in the commercial register. The program of Albrecht Knaus consisted of fiction and nonfiction books in paperback. The publishing group Bertelsmann was responsible for production and distribution of books. The collaboration between the publisher and Bertelsmann was first viewed skeptically by colleagues. Albrecht Knaus, who was very aware of the direction he wanted to go, held his freedom as a publisher in contrary to the comments of critics. One of the first authors in Albrecht Knaus Verlag was Walter Kempowski, later came others, such as Manfred Bieler with Ewig und drei Tage, Hisako Matsubara with Abendkranich and Leni Riefenstahl with her biography.

1984 the Albrecht Knaus Verlag was transformed into a limited liability company At the same time the headquarters of the publisher was moved to Munich. In Hamburg only a branch remained. After 1994, the Albrecht Knaus Verlag was directed by the publishing group Bertelsmann. Since 1999, the profits are also paid out to Bertelsmann. Since then, the Albrecht Knaus Verlag continued as an imprint of the publishing group. Albrecht Knaus led the publisher until 1989. Knaus was followed by Hans Ewald Dede and Karl Blessing. The criticism that the publisher did not have its own profile, was responded by representatives from Knaus Verlag as undifferentiated and unfounded. Rather, they stressed the independence of all publishers under the umbrella of Random House publishing group. Successor to Dede and Blessing was Karl heinz Bittel. Under Bittel, works of authors such as Pascal Mercier and Georg Oswald were published. Succeeding Claudia Vidoni was Wolfgang Ferchl who became head of Albrecht Knaus Verlag in 2009.

== Authors ==
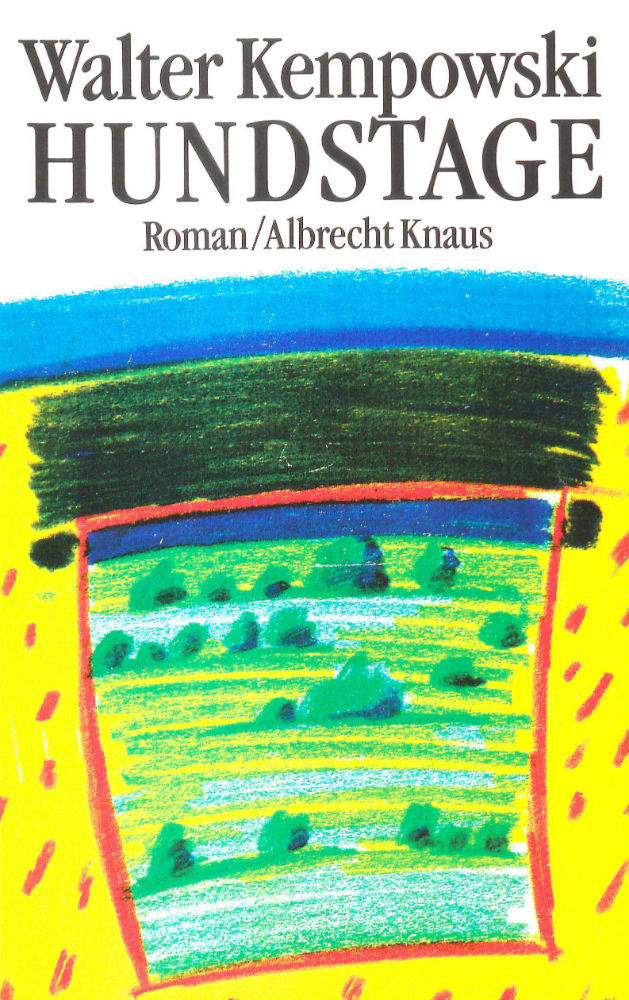
Hundstage (1988)

- Peter Ackroyd
- Joseph Boyden
- John Burnside
- Peter Cameron
- Stanislas Dehaene
- Thea Dorn
- Jenny Erpenbeck
- Carsten Jensen
- Josef Joffe
- Walter Kempowski
- Ross King
- David Lama
- Harald Lesch
- Pascal Mercier
- Philipp Meyer
- Walter Moers
- Irène Némirovsky
- Lawrence Norfolk
- Rachel Seiffert
- Gerhard Seyfried
- Cora Stephan
- Karin Struck
- Sandro Veronesi
- Vendela Vida
- Simon Winchester
- Xiaolu Guo
