= Hans-Jürgen Kuhl =

German photo businessman

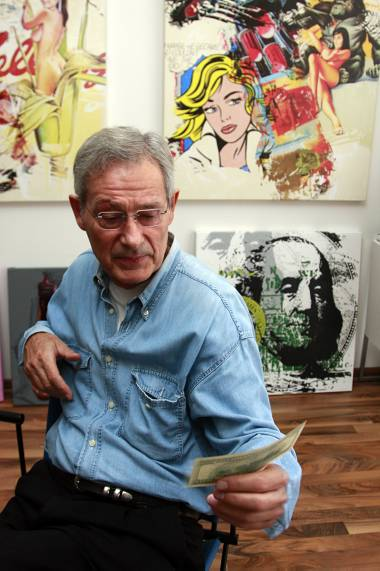
- Kuhl in his gallery in 2010
- Born: 1941 (age 84–85); Dattenfeld, Windeck, North Rhine-Westphalia, Germany
- Occupation: Photo businessman
- Penalty: 6 years
- Website: Official website (in German)

Hans-Jürgen Kuhl (born 1941) is a German photo businessman who works as a freelance graphic designer and has become internationally known as a counterfeiter.

== Life ==
Hans-Jürgen Kuhl was born in 1941 in Dattenfeld in the local community Windeck in North Rhine-Westphalia, Germany.

Kuhl's father was a factory owner. From 1944, he lived with his parents and four siblings in Cologne. He completed an apprenticeship as a photo businessman, and from 1970 he worked as a freelance graphic designer and repro photographer. In the graphic field, Kuhl specialized in collages from photographs and drawings, which he used as a source for the actual artistic end product: screen printing in his own studio.

From 1961 he came into contact with the Cologne underworld, where he met Anton Dumm and Heinrich Schäfer and was nicknamed "De Duv" on the Cologne ring scene, which he continued long after his "criminal" machinations continued. He renounced the milieu and achieved commercial success with his own fashion creations in the summer of 1971 with the emerging fashion of hotpants. Due to irregularities in the conduct of the business, he was sentenced to one month imprisonment during this period. This was followed by founding his own fashion label under the name Paloma, which was also commercially successful.

When his financial situation worsened, he and four accomplices planned to forge US dollar bills and distribute them for 10% of their face value. For this purpose, computers, scanners, a screen printing system and offset machines were acquired. The paper they obtained from the former Yugoslavia - like the original Cranes Crest paper - did not glow under UV light.

In his Pulheim workshop, he scanned a $100 bill from a savings bank, then changed the serial numbers with a graphics program, combined twelve bills into a sheet, photographed them and made printing plates. After many unsuccessful attempts, high-quality forgeries emerged, but no buyers were found for them.

On 25 September 2006 workers at a waste disposal facility found plastic bags with dollar bills and documents in good shape, which investigators quickly took to Kuhl's address. Because of the seriousness of the crime, the Cologne criminal police handed the case over to the Federal Criminal Police Office (BKA). The experts described the fakes as „erschreckend perfekt“ ("terrifyingly perfect").

It was the third largest find of false dollar bills worldwide and the second largest in Germany, surpassed by 25 million that the Lower Saxony police found in Alfeld in 1994.

On 25 May 2007 Cologne police announced details of the case at a press conference. On 8 November 2007, after making a comprehensive confession, the Cologne District Court sentenced Kuhl to six years in prison after just one day of trial, of which he spent three and a half years in open prison. The judge called him an „außerordentlichen Grafiker“ ("extraordinary graphic artist") who had become a counterfeiter because of „einer massiven finanziellen Schieflage“ ("a massive financial difficulty").

== Reception ==
As part of the ZDF series Terra X, the counterfeit money case was reproduced in detail for the first episode of the two-part series F wie Fälschung (F for Fake) with Kuhl's own participation.

ProSieben also published a 15-minute report on Kuhl's career as a counterfeiter as part of the Galileo 2020 series also with the participation of Jürgen Kuhl.

== Literature ==
- Christoph Gottwald: Blütenträume – Die unglaubliche Geschichte des Geldfälschers Jürgen Kuhl. DuMont, Köln 2010, ISBN 978-3-8321-9532-8.
- Andrea Haefely: Schweigen, schummeln, lügen: Was ist erlaubt? Beobachter-Edition, Zürich 2014, ISBN 978-3-85569-830-1, S. 112; , p. 112, at Google Books
