= Miroslav Nemec (actor) =

German actor of Croatian descent (born 1954)

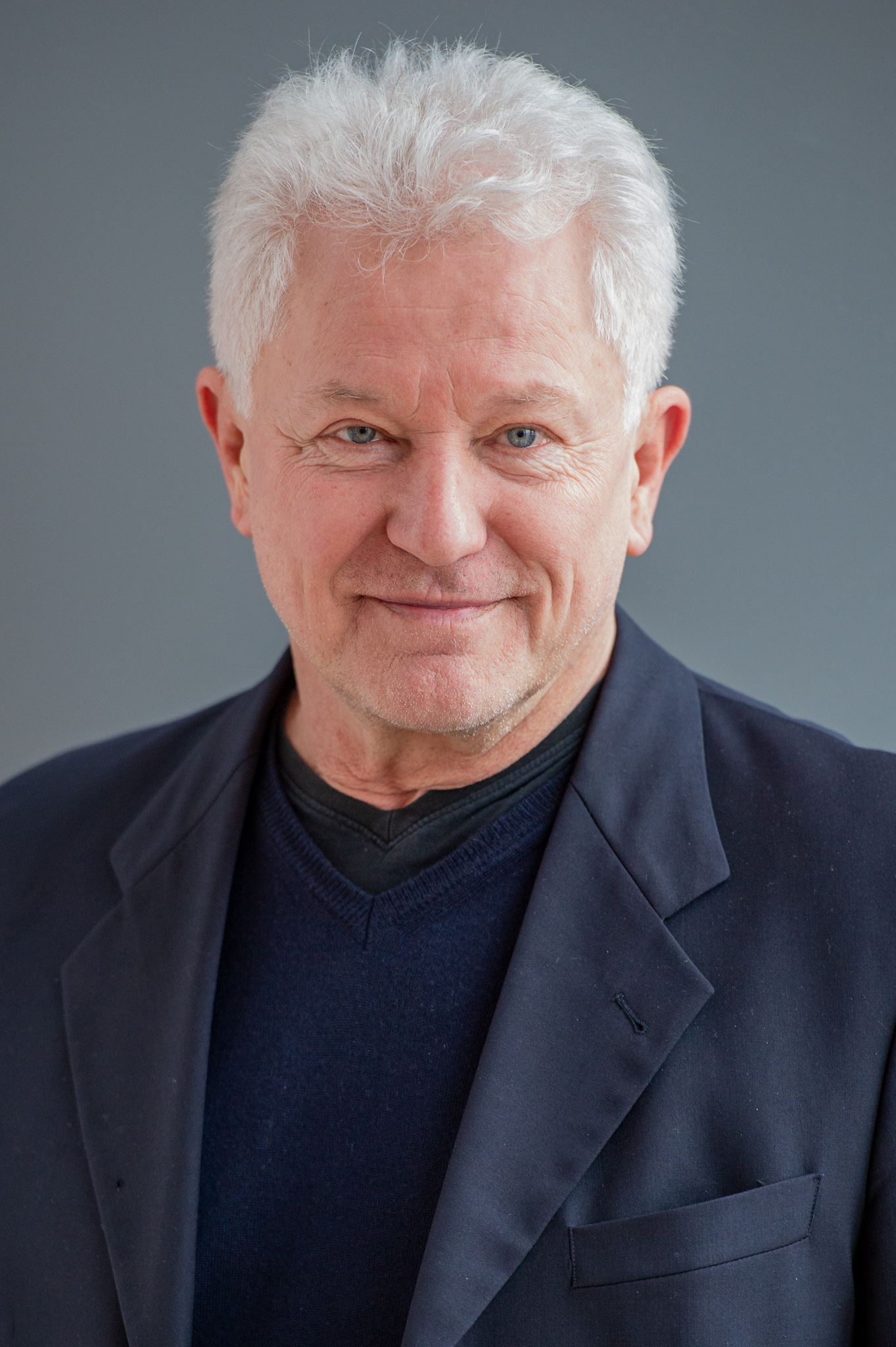
- Born: Miroslav Strkanec; June 26, 1954 (age 71); Zagreb, Yugoslavia
- Occupation: Actor
- Years active: 1977-present
- Spouse: Katrin Jäger

Miroslav Nemec (born 26 June 1954) is a German actor. Since 1991 he has played Inspector Ivo Batic in the Munich Tatort alongside Udo Wachtveitl.

== Early life and education ==
Nemec was born in Zagreb as Miroslav Strkanec. His father Milan worked at a bank and his mother Nina was a secretary. After his parents divorced, he moved to Bavaria at the age of twelve and was adopted by relatives in Freilassing. He went to school in Traunstein, where at fifteen he started band Asphyxia.

Nemec studied piano at Mozarteum in Salzburg. After qualifying as a music teacher, he trained as an actor in Zürich.

== Career ==
=== Stage ===
From 1977 Nemec worked in theatre. He appeared at the Cologne Stages, the Bavarian State Theatre, and theatres in Essen and Munich. In 1992/93 he played Puck in Benjamin Britten's A Midsummer Night's Dream at the Oper Frankfurt.

=== Television ===
Nemec had his first television role in Die Wiesingers (1984), playing a son-in-law of a Munich brewery family. He appeared in Liebling Kreuzberg (1990), and had guest parts in Derrick and Der Alte.

Nemec first appear in Tatort in 1988, in an episode with Götz George. Three years later he took over the role of Inspector Ivo Batic in the Munich series. Their 100th, final, episode shown in April 2026.

=== Other work ===
Nemec leads the Miro Nemec Band and still plays with his school band Asphyxia.

He wrote an autobiography, Miroslav – Jugoslav (2011), and two crime novels.

In 1994 he co-founded HAND IN HAND, a charity for war orphans in Croatia and Bosnia and Herzegovina, with Tatort colleagues Wachtveitl and Michael Fitz. It was dissolved in 2004.

== Personal life ==
Nemec was married in the 1980s and has a daughter. He has married in 2013 with Katrin Jäger. Their daughter was born in 2012.

== Filmography ==
Year	Title	Notes
1984	Die Wiesingers	TV series
1985	Aktenzeichen XY … ungelöst	3 episodes
1988	Tatort: Gebrochene Blüten	with Götz George
1989	Tatort: Der Pott	with Götz George
1990	Liebling Kreuzberg	3 episodes
1991–2026	Tatort	Munich series
1994	Der Salzbaron	5 episodes
2004	Das Traumschiff	"Sri Lanka"
2013	Der blinde Fleck	
2014–15	Dr. Klein	12 episodes

== Awards ==
- 1997: Goldener Löwe (with Udo Wachtveitl)
- 2001: Bavarian Television Award for Tatort: Kleine Diebe
- 2002: Grimme Award for Tatort: Im freien Fall
- 2011: Grimme Award for Tatort: Nie wieder frei sein
- 2011: Bavarian Order of Merit
- 2012: Bavarian Television Award, Honorary Prize (with Wachtveitl)
- 2017: Bavarian Constitutional Medal in Silver

== Publications ==
- Miroslav - Jugoslav. Gerhard Hess Verlag, 2011. ISBN 978-3-87336-405-9
- Die Toten von der Falkneralm. Albrecht Knaus Verlag, 2016. ISBN 978-3-8135-0702-7
- Kroatisches Roulette. Penguin Verlag, 2018. ISBN 978-3-328-60007-7
