= Munich's financial community =

Totality of financial services located in Munich and its region

Munich's financial community consists of the banks, insurance companies, and other providers of financial services located in Munich and its region. Prime among the insurers are two global players: Munich Re (turnover in 2012: €52.0 billion) and Allianz (turnover in 2012: €106.4 billion). Munich's banking sector is large and multifaceted. All told, the region's insurers and banks employ 55,810 people – equivalent to 8.1% of the region's total workforce.

== Insurers ==
Employing some 33,000 persons, Munich's insurance sector is the largest in Germany and is among the world's leaders. Headquartered in the Munich region are some 60 insurers, including the Allianz Group, Munich Re, D.A.S., Versicherungskammer Bayern and Bayerische Versorgungskammer. Also at home in the region are such non-German insurers as Swiss Re.

== Banks ==
Home to 160 banks, savings banks and credit unions, Munich has the second largest banking sector in Germany, the largest being at Frankfurt am Main. Munich's 50 banks include Bayerische Hypo- und Vereinsbank AG, which merged with Unicredit to form a European-level banking group; and BayernLB. Stadtsparkasse München is one of Germany's largest savings banks. Mortgage-related transactions are one of the sector's specialties. Munich-based banks issue one third of all Germany's mortgage bonds.

== Asset management ==
In 1949, the Munich-based ADIG became Germany's first collective investment scheme. Today, asset managers owned by Munich-based companies administer assets worth substantially more than one trillion euros.

== Munich Stock Exchange ==
Traded on the Munich Stock Exchange, which is owned by Bayerische Börse AG, are stocks, bonds, funds, ETFs and ETCs. The Exchange's m:access provides SMEs with a way of securing equity. Dealt on the Exchange's Contrex and greenmarket platforms are CFDs and CO_{2} emission certificates.

== Private equity and venture capital ==
More than 40 venture capital and private equity companies are headquartered in Munich. Also in the city are a large number of other companies in the sector.

== Leasing and factoring ==
The Munich region is home to Germany's largest leasing sector. Of the some 200 members of Germany's Association of Leasing Companies (holding a 90% share of the country's market), nearly 20% are headquartered in the region, including Kommanditgesellschaft Allgemeine Leasing (KGAL), LHI Leasing and Hannover Leasing. Home to such companies as Eurofactor AG, Munich's factoring sector is among the largest in Germany.

== Capital provision institutions ==
Munich is home to two institutions that are major providers of capital: LfA Förderbank Bayern and BayBG Bayerische Beteiligungsgesellschaft. The LfA's main activity is the supplying of cost-advantageous loans to start-ups and to SMEs. BayBG provides equity to SMEs, to which it then serves as a silent partner.

== Institutions ==
Rounding out Munich's financial community are the office of the Deutsche Bundesbank and such dedicated organizations as Bavaria's Banking Association and the Association of Bavarian Savings Banks.
