= Antje-Katrin Kühnemann =

German doctor and television presenter

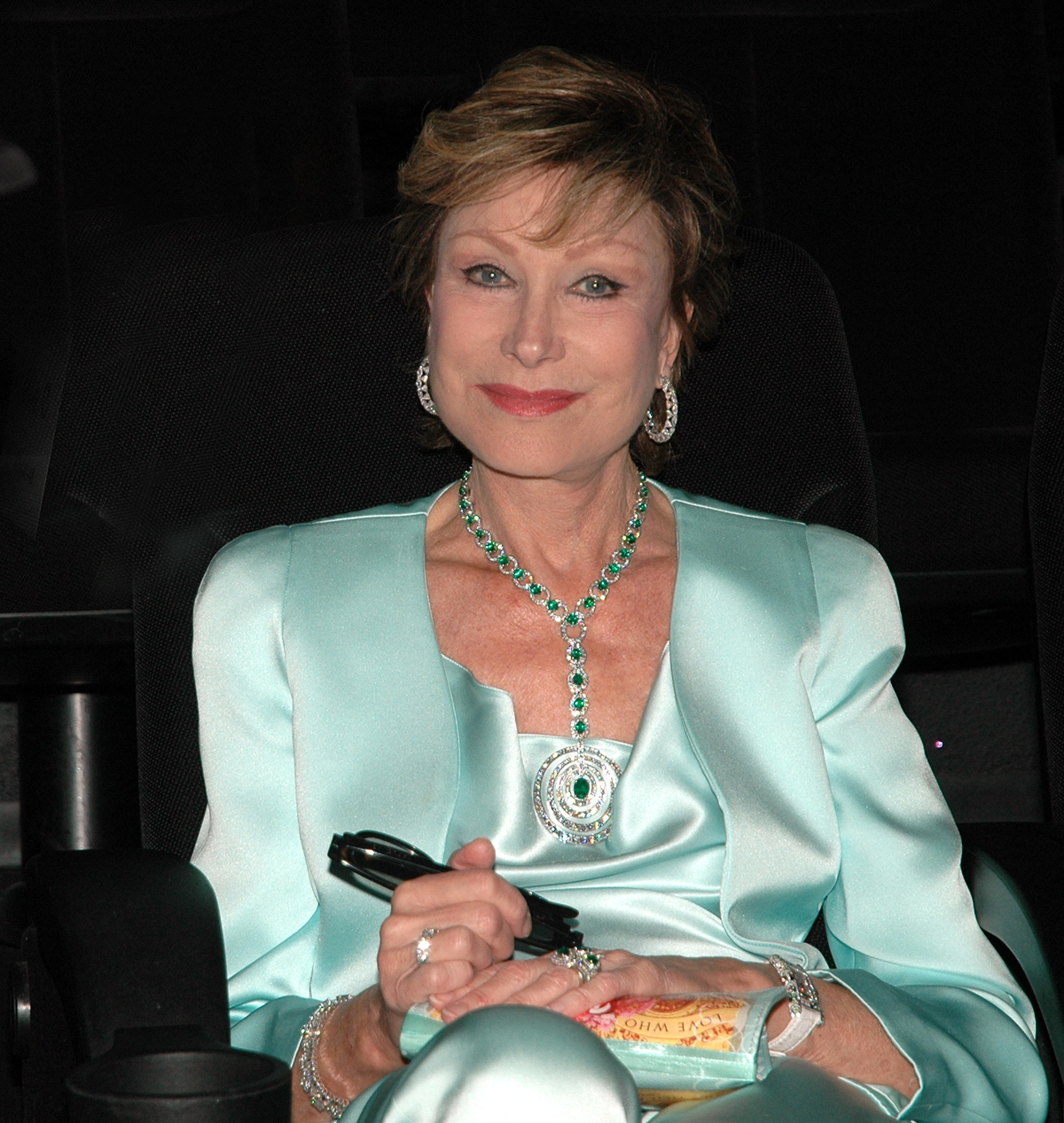
- Kühnemann in 2014
- Born: 22 February 1945; Herzberg am Harz, Gau Southern Hanover-Brunswick, Germany
- Died: 3 March 2025 (aged 80); Tegernsee, Germany
- Other names: Antje Schaeffer-Kühnemann

Signature
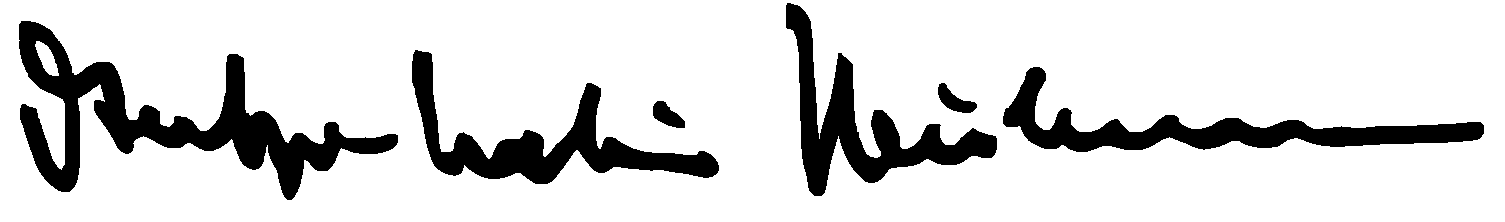

Antje-Katrin Kühnemann (22 February 1945 – 3 March 2025) was a German doctor and television presenter.

== Early life and career ==
The daughter of an officer, she grew up with her mother and three siblings in Munich after the early death of her father. Her family originally came from northern Germany. After graduating from the St. Anna Girls' High School (now: St. Anna Municipal High School) in 1965, she initially wanted to study art education at the Academy of Fine Arts in Munich, but then decided to study medicine at LMU Munich. In 1971 she received her doctorate on the subject of Parotid gland disease in childhood. During her time as an assistant doctor, she worked on diabetes mellitus at the Munich-Schwabing Hospital under Hellmut Mehnert, on plastic surgery under Ursula Schmidt-Tintemann at the Rechts der Isar Hospital and on radiology at the Harlaching Municipal Hospital. She then worked at the Neuwittelsbach Hospital, a specialist clinic for internal medicine. From 1979 to the end of 2018 she was medical director of the Sanatorium Vital-Zentrum GmbH in Rottach-Egern in Bavaria.

== Media activity ==
In 1965, alongside her studies, Kühnemann began working as the youngest German television announcer for the Bavarian Broadcasting Corporation's study program and shortly afterwards for ARD. She continued this successful career until 1979. In the 1970s, she was given various afternoon program presentations. In addition to children's programs, she hosted a 13-part gymnastics series on Bavarian Television in 1972 and the Southwest Radio's Telekolleg series Biology II in 1973. In 1977, she hosted the quiz show "How would you like it?" with Hans-Joachim Kulenkampff, from 1978 to 1988 the live weekend show "Saturday Club" and from 1989 "Health! Medicine" on Das Erste, a co-production of Bayerischer Rundfunk and SFB (later ARD-Ratgeber: Gesundheit by BR and rbb). The doctor achieved great popularity with the health magazine Die Sprechstunde. Ratgeber für die Gesundheit, produced by Bavarian Television, which was broadcast from 25 September 1973 to 1 October 2007. She also compiled medical contributions for the radio (Bayern 3 and Radio Luxemburg).

From 1971 to 1979 she published fortnightly medical advice in the Fernsehwoche and later also in the Munich Abendzeitung. In 1981 she wrote a five-part medical series for the TV guide Hörzu and a bi-weekly column from 1983 to 1985. From 1984 on, she wrote articles for every other issue of the bi-weekly magazine Neue Apotheken-Illustrierte. Kühnemann gave lectures, moderated events on medical topics and was a frequent guest on talk shows.

Kühnemann was the officially appointed ambassador for the German José Carreras Leukaemia Foundation. In 1985, she founded the Association for the Promotion of Treatment of Burn Victims (VFBB eV) together with Wolfgang Mühlbauer and Guido Graf Henckel von Donnersmark, which she actively supported as patron. She was also an ambassador for the initiative "Jetzt gerade! It's all about the excitement" from April 2010.

In 2010, Kühnemann was the patron of the Coffee Day, initiated by the German Coffee Association.

== Personal life and death ==
Kühnemann was married to the crime writer and screenwriter Max Pierre Schaeffer from 1974 until their divorce in 1985. Her second marriage was to the entrepreneur Jörg Gühring (1935–2021). She completed two years of singing training and was a member of the Munich Vokalkreis for ten years. She was a close friend of Leni Riefenstahl and gave the eulogy at her funeral.

In June 2010, Kühnemann publicly announced that she had breast cancer. After an operation, she began chemotherapy. She had 40 operations as part of her treatment.

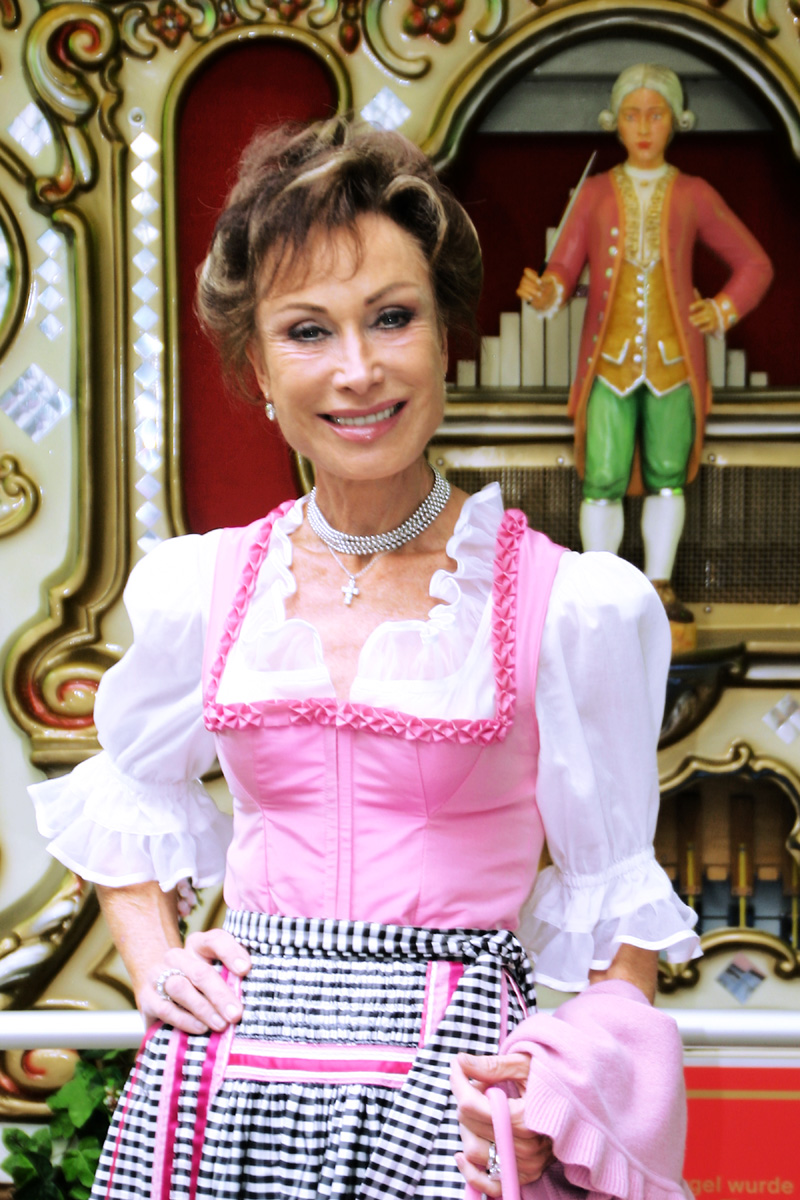
Antje-Katrin Kühnemann in September 2009

Kühnemann died on 28 February 2025, at the age of 80.

== Memberships ==
Kühnemann was an advisor to the Munich Board of Trustees for Women and Healthy Living and was a member of the supervisory board of Togal-Werk AG, Munich-Bogenhausen.

== Awards ==
On 22 February 1980, Kühnemann received the Goldene Kamera in 1979 and the Bambi in 1982. In 1986 she was awarded the Federal Cross of Merit and in 1988 the Hartmann-Thieding Medal of the Hartmannbund. In the same year, German florists voted her Fleurop Lady and in 1995 she was presented with the Media Prize for a Smoke-Free Society 1995 by the Non-Smoker Initiative Germany e. V. She was also awarded the Bavarian TV Awards in 1997 and on 7 July 1999, the Bavarian Order of Merit by Minister-President of Bavaria Edmund Stoiber in the Kaisersaal of the Munich Residence.

== Publications ==
- Kühnemann, Antje Katrin: Bleiben Sie gesund mit mir!: was Sie am meisten interessiert – hier meine Antworten. – complete paperback issue, 1st edition – Munich: Goldmann, 2003. – 427 pages – (Goldmann; 16574 : Mosaik). – ISBN 3-442-16574-1
- Kühnemann, Antje Katrin: Interessiert bleiben und sich mitteilen. – Paderborn : Blindenschrift-Verlag „Pauline von Mallinckrodt“, 2000. – 59 pages – (Paderborner Schriftenreihe; 168)
- Kühnemann, Antje Katrin: Dr.-Kühnemann-Trenn-Kost: ein Rezeptbuch für Schlankheit und Gesundheit. – 16th edition – Munich: Heyne, 1994. – 202 pages – (Heyne-Koch- und Getränkebücher; 4435). – ISBN 3-453-40419-X
- Kühnemann, Antje Katrin: Die Kühnemann-Diät: gesund abnehmen und erfolgreich schlank bleiben. – unabridged paperback issue, 6th edition – Munich: Heyne, 1992. – 207 pages – (Heyne-Koch- und Getränkebücher; 4647). – ISBN 3-453-06074-1
- Kühnemann, Antje Katrin: Geheimnisse der Klostermedizin : Kräuter, Säfte, Tees, Rezepte u. Ratschläge. – licensed issue – Augsburg: Weltbild, 1989. – 148 pages – ISBN 3-926187-25-5
- Kühnemann, Antje Katrin: Parotistumoren im Kindesalter. thesis, Munich 1971, DNB-IDN 570509009
