= Bettina Kupfer =

German actress

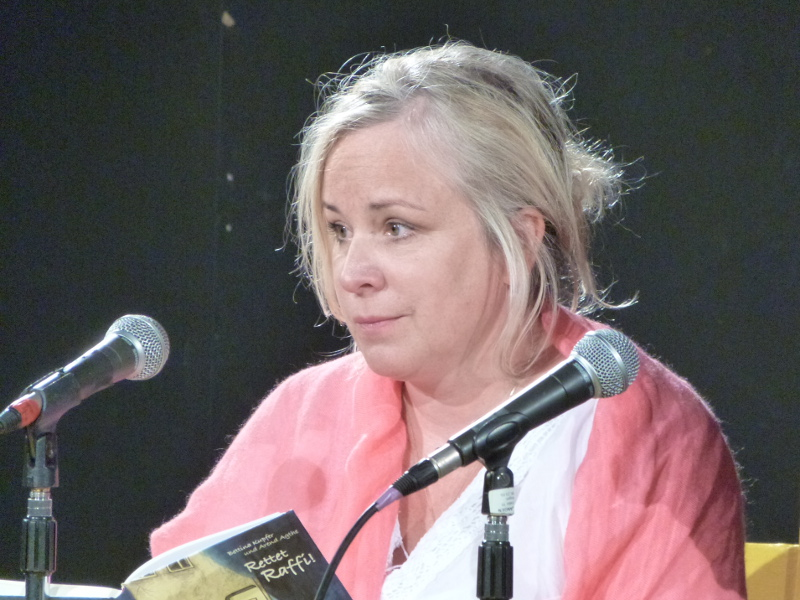
- Kupfer in 2010
- Born: 19 July 1963 (age 61); Stuttgart, West Germany
- Occupation(s): Actress, author

Bettina Kupfer (born 19 July 1963) is a German actress and author who has been active since the 1980s. She and her husband, Arend Agthe, write screenplays and children's literature.

== Career ==
Kupfer was born in Stuttgart. After acquiring her Abitur at the Ernst-Sigle-Gymnasium in Kornwestheim, Kupfer studied the English and German languages and philosophy at the State University of Music and Performing Arts Stuttgart. She graduated with a degree in drama, and then found successive employment at the Staatstheater Stuttgart, Staatstheater Nürnberg, Düsseldorfer Schauspielhaus, and Theater Basel. Kupfer got her breakthrough by playing Regina Perlman in the 1993 film Schindler's List. Two years later, she was awarded the 1996 Bavarian TV Award for Best Actress for her role in the 1995 television movie Das Wunschkind.

Kupfer was the lead actress in the German television series Drei mit Herz and had previously appeared in guest roles on shows like Wolffs Revier and Ein Fall für zwei. From 1996 to 1997, she played the secretary Daniela Holm in Girl friends – Freundschaft mit Herz.

== Education ==
In 2013, Kupfer received a master's degree in psychology from the International Psychoanalytic University Berlin.
