= Zwei Ärzte sind einer zu viel =

- Starring: Christiane Hörbiger; Elmar Wepper
- Country of origin: Germany

Zwei Ärzte sind einer zu viel is a German television series.

== See also ==
- List of German television series
