= Harald Lesch =

German physicist

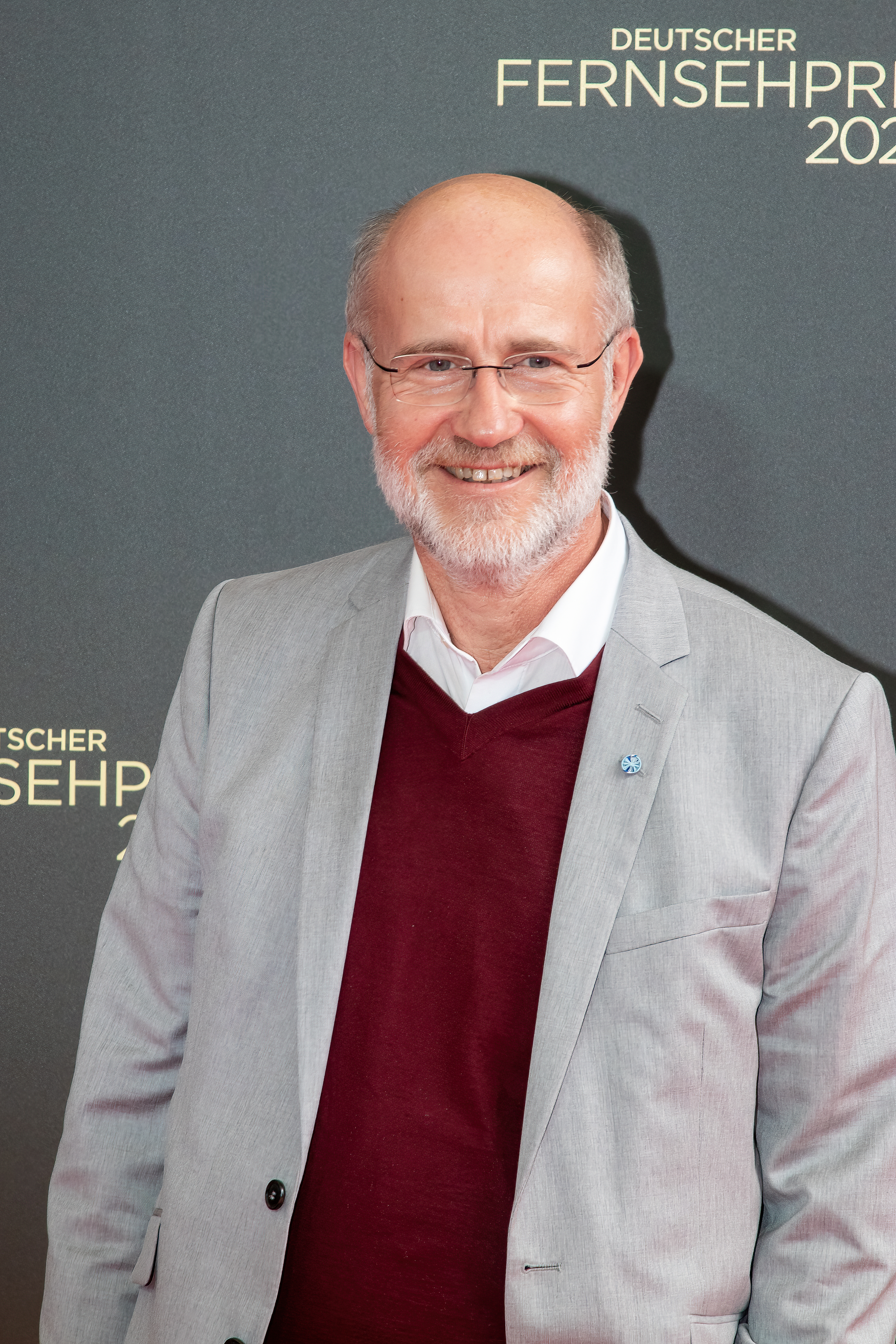
- Lesch at the Deutscher Fernsehpreis in 2021
- Born: 28 July 1960 (age 66); Gießen, West Germany
- Known for: Terra X
- Scientific career
- Fields: Physics
- Workplaces: LMU Munich

Harald Lesch (born 28 July 1960) is a German physicist, astronomer, natural philosopher, author, television presenter, professor of physics at LMU Munich and professor of natural philosophy at Munich School of Philosophy.

== Education ==
Lesch was born in Giessen. After completing secondary school in 1978 at the Theo-Koch-Schule in Grünberg, Hesse, Lesch studied physics at the University of Giessen, then at the University of Bonn, where he completed his doctoral degree in 1987 and worked at the Max Planck Institute for Radio Astronomy. From 1988 to 1991, he was a research assistant at Heidelberg-Königstuhl State Observatory. In 1992, he was a visiting professor at the University of Toronto. In 1994, he was habilitated at the University of Bonn.

== Work ==
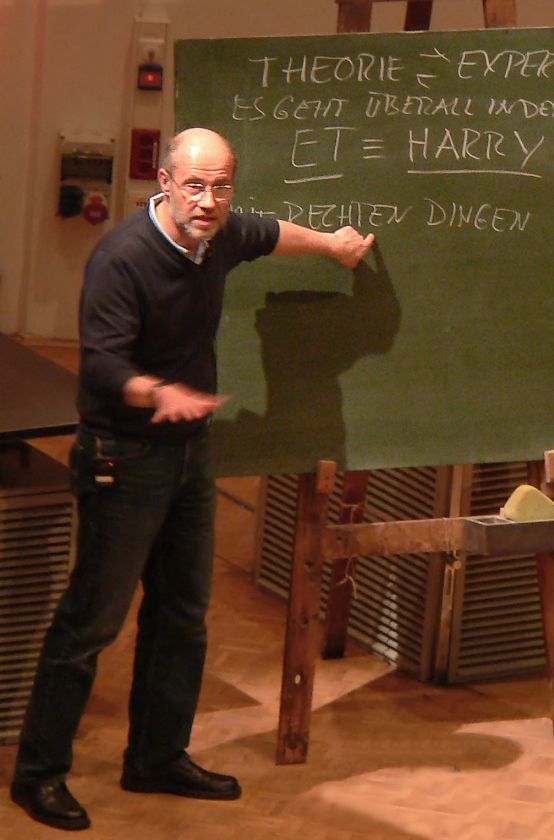
Lesch in 2010

Since 1995, Lesch has been a professor of theoretical astrophysics at the Institute for Astronomy and Astrophysics at LMU Munich. Additionally, he teaches natural philosophy at Munich School of Philosophy. His main areas of research are cosmic plasma physics, black holes, and neutron stars. He is the expert on astrophysics in the Deutsche Forschungsgemeinschaft (DFG) (German Research Society) and a member of the Astronomische Gesellschaft (Astronomical Society). He is also a textbook author.

Lesch has made television appearances for the longstanding, self-presented production of the channel BR-alpha: alpha-Centauri, Lesch & Co., Denker des Abendlandes (Thinkers of the Western World), and Alpha bis Omega (From Alpha to Omega). He also presented shorter television series. His presentations attempt to make complex physical or philosophical issues more accessible to the public. In 2005, he was awarded the Communicator Prize by the DFG and the Stifterverband für die Deutsche Wissenschaft (Foundation for German Scholarship) for his television appearances and publications. To honor his work on making scientific findings understandable to the broad public, the Naturforschende Gesellschaft zu Emden (nature research society) awarded him an honorary membership on 15 March 2011.

== Television appearances ==
For many years, Lesch has presented a number of television series for the channel BR-alpha, beginning with alpha-Centauri, in which he is to be seen since 1998. In "Lesch & Co." and "Denker des Abendlandes" (thinkers of the occident), he converses with the philosophy professor Wilhelm Vossenkuhl about philosophical topics. Alpha bis Omega deals with contradiction and consistency of religion and natural science, through conversations between Lesch and the Catholic theologist Thomas Schwartz.

In celebration of the Year of Einstein 2005, BR-alpha aired the 8-part series The Physics of Albert Einstein, where in each episode, one single scientific finding of Einstein was introduced by Lesch, who explained its significance. Starting in August 2007, the 16-part program The 4 Elements was aired weekly, which deals with the structure of the world, and in addition to scientific aspects, also handles cultural-historical aspects.

For the Pay-TV channel Syfy he differentiates scientifically based and fictional components of Star Trek in the series Star Trek – Science vs. Fiction. From April to the end of 2007, Lesch moderated the weekly 5-minute program sci_xpert for this channel, which dealt with viewer questions, which mostly had to do with feasibility of science fiction concepts (such as "How realistic are the huge spaceships from Independence Day?"), but which also addressed purely scientific topics (for example "What is gravity?"), which were handled in the tradition of alpha-Centauri. There were a total of 35 episodes.

Since September 2008, Lesch has been presenting the ZDF scholarly magazine Abenteuer Forschung (Adventures in Research). His predecessor was Joachim Bublath, who presented the show for many years.

At the start of the "International Year of Astronomy 2009", Lesch moderated in ZDF the 2½ hour special "How Light Was Born: the Long Night with Harald Lesch", in which he, between short documentary films, led conversations with the cabaret artist and hobby-philosopher Christoph Süß, the physics professor Günther Hasinger, and the theology professor Thomas Schwartz.

Since 2010, Lesch presents the show "Lesch's Kosmos", a 15-minute programme on the German documentary channel ZDFneo that deals with issues from various scientific fields.

== Awards ==
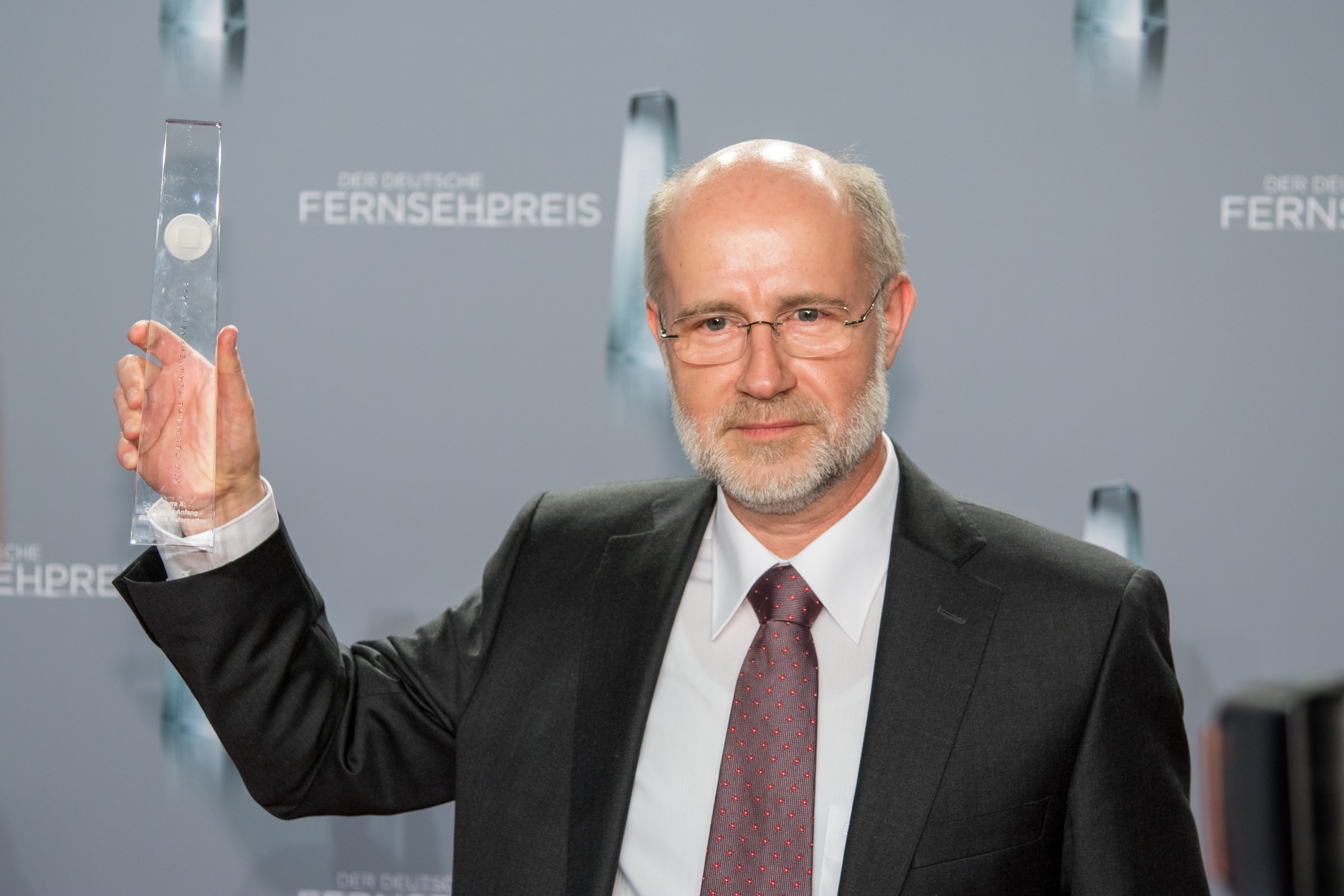
Harald Lesch receiving the Deutscher Fernsehpreis in 2018

- 1988 Otto-Hahn-Medallion from the Max-Planck-Society (for the dissertation "Nonlinear Plasma Processes in Active Galactic Cores")
- 1994 Bennigsen-Foerder-Prize from the state of North Rhine-Westphalia (EUR 75,000): "Heating of Galactic High Speed Clouds through Magnetic Reconnection"
- 2004 Prize for Scientific Journalism from the Grüter-Foundation (EUR 10,000)
- 2005 Communicator-Prize (EUR 50,000)
- 2005 Medallion for Natural Science Journalism from the German Physical Society
- 2009 Medallion "Bene Merenti de Astronomia Norimbergensi" in Gold from the Nuremberg Astronomical Society.
- 2009 IQ Award
- 2019 Hanns Joachim Friedrichs Award
- 2023 Officer's Cross of the Order of Merit of the Federal Republic of Germany

== Selected works ==
Harald Lesch and Jörn Müller

- Cosmology for Pedestrians. A Journey through the Universe.
- Big Bang, Act Two. On the Trail of Life in Space.
- Cosmology for Bright Heads. The Dark Side of the Universe.
- Do You Know How Many Stars There Are? How Light is Born.

Harald Lesch and Klaus Kamphausen

- Die Menschheit schafft sich ab. (The Human Race Is Eliminating Itself.)

Harald Lesch and the Quot-Team

- Physics for the Vest Pocket
- Quantum Mechanics for the Vest Pocket

Harald Lesch and Harald Zaun

- The Shortest History of all of Life

== See also ==
- Educational television
- Science education
- Astronomy education
- Philosophy education
- Anthropocene
- Cosmology
