= Hisako Matsubara =

Japanese writer

Hisako Matsubara (松原 久子, Matsubara Hisako; May 21, 1935 in Kyoto) is a Japanese novelist who has published works in German, English and Japanese.

Born as the daughter of a prominent Shinto priest, Matsubara grew up at the Kenkun Shrine in the northern part of Kyoto. She graduated from high school in Kyoto, then attended Tokyo's International Christian University, where she studied comparative religion and literature. After receiving a BA, she moved to the United States to study theater arts at Pennsylvania State University, from which she graduated with a MA. She worked for a while as an editor in the US before moving to Germany in 1962. She lived in Marburg and Göttingen, where she attended the university and perfected her German language skills. She then settled in Cologne, and in 1970, obtained her PhD in philosophy jointly from the Ruhr University of Bochum and the University of Göttingen. In 1967 Matsubara started to write a regular column at the German weekly newspaper Die Zeit. This work turned into a collection of short stories and essays, Blick aus Mandelaugen, 1968, through which she entered the German literary scene. In 1969, Matsubara published a German translation of the ancient Japanese tale Taketori-monogatari. She worked on documentaries of the major German TV stations ARD and ZDF. She published several novels in German (Brokatrausch 1978, Glückspforte 1980, Abendkranich 1981, Brückenbogen 1986,Karpfentanz 1994, Himmelszeichen 1998) which were quite successful in German speaking countries. The novels Brokatrausch (English title: Samurai) and Abendkranich (English title: Cranes at Dusk) were translated into several languages including English. Her novels are set during recent Japanese history addressing changes in Japanese culture relating to modernization and western influences. Matsubara also wrote non-fiction books (Weg zu Japan 1983, and Raumschiff Japan 1989) highlighting contrasts between Japanese history and European history over the past five centuries. She moved back to the US in the mid 1980s, where she was a scholar at the Hoover Institution of Stanford University. In recent years, she has published mostly in Japanese, both fiction and non-fiction. Currently she lives with her family in Los Altos.

Hisako Matsubara is a member of the German PEN since 1971 and since 1985 a member of the American Art Directors Club. She received the New York Critics Award in 1985 and in 1987 she was the Writer in residence at the East West Center in Manoa, Hawaii.

Matsubara is married to the German solid state physicist Friedemann Freund. Their son, the physicist Minoru Freund (1962-2012), died of brain tumor (glioblastoma) in early 2012. The woodcut artist Naoko Matsubara is her younger sister.

== Works ==
- The Tale of the Shining Princess, Kodansha International Ltd. 1966, ISBN 978-4-7700-0023-1
  German edition: "Die Geschichte des Bambussammler, Langewiesche-Brand, 1966
- Blick aus Mandelaugen: Eine Japanerin in Deutschland, Piper 1968, ISBN 3-8135-0624-X
- "Hisako Matsubara's Weltausstellung", Piper 1969, ISBN 3-492-01835-1
- Brokatrausch, Albrecht Knaus 1978, ISBN 978-3-442-08451-7
  English edition:Samurai, Times Books 1980, ISBN 0-8129-0852-X
- Glückspforte, Albrecht Knaus 1980, ISBN 978-3-8135-0563-4
- Abendkranich: Eine Kindheit in Japan, Albrecht Knaus 1981 ISBN 978-3-8135-6619-2
  English edition: Cranes at Dusk (Abendkranich), Doubleday 1985, ISBN 978-0-385-27858-4
- "Blick aus Mandelaugen: West-Ostliche Miniature" Albrecht Knaus 1981 ISBN 3-8135-2146-X
- Brückenbogen, Albrecht Knaus 1986, ISBN 3-8135-0267-8
- Wakon no jidai, Mikasa Shobo 1987, ISBN 978-4-8379-1344-3
- Nihon no chie Yoroppa no chie, Mikasa Shobo 1987, ISBN 978-4-8379-1266-8
- Raumschiff Japan: Realität und Provokation, Albrecht Knaus 1989, ISBN 3-8135-0624-X
- The Japanese: A Mystery Unfolded, Atlantic Monthly Press 1990, ISBN 978-0-87113-111-9
- Karpfentanz, Albrecht Knaus 1994, ISBN 978-3-8135-6084-8
- Himmelszeichen, Albrecht Knaus 1998, ISBN 978-3-442-44700-8
- "Kotoageseyo Nihon", President Sha 2000, ISBN 4-8334-9055-2
- "Ogoreru Hakujin", Bungei Shunju 2005, ISBN 4-16-366980-9
- "Kuroi Jujika", Fujiwara Shoten 2008, ISBN 978-4-89434-665-9
- Mino: A young scientist's life-long journey through outer and inner space, Daniel & Daniel 2019 ISBN 978-1-56474-614-6
  Japanese edition: Boku-ga anochikyu-ni sundeitakoro,Gentosha Publisher, Tokyo, 2022 ISBN 978-4-344-93993-6
