= Peter Scholl-Latour =

German journalist and author

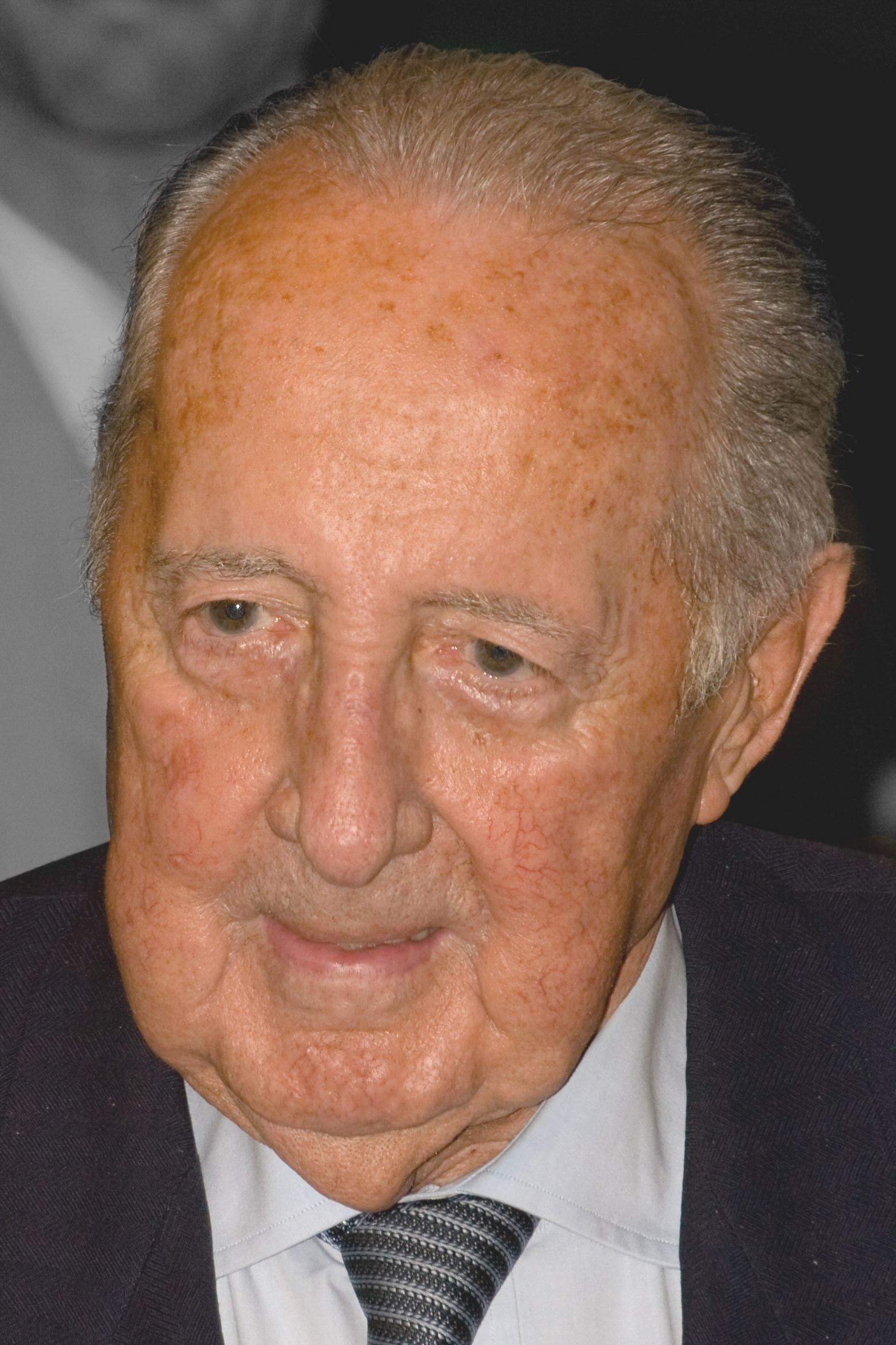
- Scholl-Latour at a lecture in the University of the Bundeswehr Munich, 2008
- Born: Peter Roman Scholl-Latour; 9 March 1924; Bochum, Germany (Weimar Republic)
- Died: 16 August 2014 (aged 90); Rhöndorf, Germany
- Education: Institut d'études politiques de Paris, Sorbonne, Saint Joseph University
- Writing career
- Genre: Political science
- Notable work: Death in the Rice-fields
- Notable awards: Chevalier of the Légion d'honneur, 2005; Cross of Merit, First class, 2006; Gerhard Löwenthal Honor Award, 2008 (issued by Junge Freiheit)

Peter Roman Scholl-Latour (9 March 1924 – 16 August 2014) was a French-German journalist, author and reporter. Scholl-Latour was regarded as one of Europe's most important journalists, akin to what Walter Cronkite was in the US. For over six decades, he was one of the continent's most influential voices. During the Vietnam War, he was captured by the Viet Cong and managed to secure unique film footage during his captivity.

== Biography ==
Peter Scholl-Latour, who was born in the Province of Westphalia and grew up in Lorraine, was the son of dermatologist Otto Konrad Scholl (1888–1960) and Mathilde Zerline Nußbaum (1896–1991; sister of the medical doctor Robert Nußbaum, who was killed in KZ Sachsenhausen) from the Alsace.

In his youth he was persecuted by the Nazis and had to flee to France. He then joined the French army and fought against his pursuers and in the Indochina War.

== Youth and education ==
Having a Jewish mother and thus suspicious of the national socialists (under the Nuremberg Laws he was considered to be a Mischling, a crossbreed of first degree), his parents baptized him as a Catholic and sent him to the Swiss Jesuit Collège Saint-Michel in Fribourg. When his parents were forbidden to keep transferring money to Switzerland he had to quit the Collège and return to Germany in 1940. He finished High School at the Wilhelmsgymnasium in Kassel in 1943.

In his book Living with France, he gives account of how, after France was liberated from German occupation in 1944, he chose to sign up with the French army. Since he failed to reach French controlled territory at Metz, he decided to join Tito's Partisan army, but was arrested in the region of Steiermark in Austria and subsequently put in a Gestapo prison. After he was freed, Scholl-Latour was a member of the Commando Parachutiste Ponchardier from 1945 to 1946, a unit of French paratroopers, with whom he fought in the First Indochina War.

After taking a master's degree at Institut d'études politiques de Paris and subsequently completing his doctoral studies at the Sorbonne, he gained another master's in Arab and Islamic studies at Lebanese University of Beirut.

== Work as a journalist ==
In 1948, he enrolled as a voluntary trainee with the Saarbrücker Zeitung and traveled to America, Africa, the Middle East and large parts of Southeast and East Asia.

In the years 1954 and 1955, he was the speaker of the government of the state of Saarland under its governor Johannes Hoffmann. In 1956, he definitely opted for journalism and traveled to Africa and Southeast Asia. From 1960 to 1963, he was permanent correspondent for Africa with the ARD. From 1963 to 1983, he was head of the Paris bureau of both the ARD and the ZDF. From 1969 to 1971, he was the executive director and programming director of the WDR.

From Paris, he regularly traveled the world, as special correspondent to Vietnam, where he and his camera team were taken prisoner by the Viet Cong in 1973. During that week of imprisonment he was allowed to film a documentary about his experience, which would be called "8 Days with the Viet Cong". It is a unique historical document and is the only professional film footage that shows original recordings from a Vietcong camp. Further trips included again Vietnam in 1976, Canada in 1978, Cambodia in 1980 as well as Afghanistan and China in 1981.

In 1983, Scholl-Latour became Editor-in-Chief of the magazine Stern and member of the board of Gruner + Jahr. As of 1984, he was a member of the board of advisors of the UFA Film- und Fernsehen GmbH. From 1988, Scholl-Latour worked as a free author publishing a great number of books, producing reports and appearing as speaker or "Expert" on various TV and Radio shows.

In 1978, Scholl-Latour had contact with Ayatollah Khomeini, who was in exile in Paris at that time. He was one of the few privileged journalists who were allowed to travel with the revolutionary leader on the Air France flight upon Khomeini's return to Iran.

In 1985, Scholl-Latour became a member of the German-Arabian Association; since 2007 its chairman.

Despite his old age, he continued writing and traveling the world. In 2008, he visited East-Timor, the only country on the planet he hadn't visited before. In the years after 9/11, he published at least one book annually, all of them bestsellers. According to Scholl-Latour, he was the best-selling non-fiction author in Germany for the last 25 years. In August 2014, Peter Scholl-Latour died at the age of 90, shortly after his final major interview with Michel von Tell.

== Rewards and honors ==
- Goldene Kamera (1969)
- Aristide-Briand-Preis (1971)
- Bambi Award (1974)
- Grimme Award (1977)
- Elsie-Kühn-Leitz-Preis (1989)
- Bavarian TV Award (1991)
- Telestar (1991)
- Straßburger Goldmedaille für deutsch-französische Annäherung
- Sonderpreis Deutsch-Französischer Kulturrat (1992)
- Hildegard von Bingen Prize for Journalism (1999)
- Honorary professor (Ruhr University Bochum, 1999)
- Ehrenpreis des Deutschen Fernsehpreises (2001)
- Hermann-Sinsheimer-Preis (2007)
- Nannen Prize (2005)
- Member of the Legion of Honor since 2005
- Karl-Carstens Prize (2006)
- Order of Merit of the Federal Republic of Germany, First Class (2006)
- Steiger Award (2007)
- Honorary Professor (University of Duisburg-Essen, 2009)

== Publications (excerpt) ==
Among his most successful books are the best-sellers Der Tod im Reisfeld [Death in the Rice-fields] (1980), Allah ist mit den Standhaften [Allah is with the Steadfast] (1983), Mord am grossen Fluss [Murder at the Great River] (1986), Mit Frankreich leben [Living with France] (1988), Der Wahn vom Himmlischen Frieden [The Delusion of Heavenly Peace] (1990), Das Schwert des Islam [The Sword of Islam] (1990), Den Gottlosen die Hölle [Hell to the Godless] (1991), Unter Kreuz und Knute [Under cross and knout] (1992), Eine Welt in Auflösung [A world in dissolution] (1993), Im Fadenkreuz der Mächte [In the crosshairs of the Powers] (1994), Schlaglichter der Weltpolitik [Highlights of International Politics] (1995), Das Schlachtfeld der Zukunft [The Battlefield of the Future] (1996), Lügen im Heiligen Land [Lies in the Holy Land] (1998), Allahs Schatten über Atatürk [Allah's Shadow Over Atatürk] (1999). His 2001 book, Afrikanische Totenklage [African Dirge], was on the Spiegel bestseller list from 2001 to 2004. His 2002 book Kampf dem Terror – Kampf dem Islam? Chronik eines unbegrenzten Krieges [Fight against Terror – fight against the Islam? Chronicle of a Never Ending War], is a sovereign and poignant in-depth account of the bizarre lines via which both exotic history and Western politics move, according to the Frankfurter Allgemeine Zeitung. His last book was Russland im Zangengriff [Russia Surrounded] (2007), Der Weg in den neuen Kalten Krieg [The road to the new cold war], 2008.

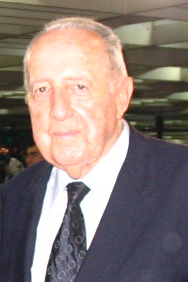
Peter Scholl-Latour

== Documentaries and interviews (excerpt) ==
In 2006 he broadcast the TV documentary "Russia Surrounded: Putin's Empire faces NATO, China and Islam"

Junge Freiheit, "Schleichende Islamisierung" Peter Scholl-Latour über die Geiselnahme von Jolo, den Bürgerkrieg auf den Philippinen und die drohende Islamisierung

Interview with FOCUS magazine printed in: Der Weg in den neuen kalten Krieg [The road to the new cold war], 2008
