= Steiger Award =

German media award

- Awarded for: Humanitarian and service award
- Date: Established 2005; 21 years ago
- Country: Germany
- Website: der-steiger-award.de

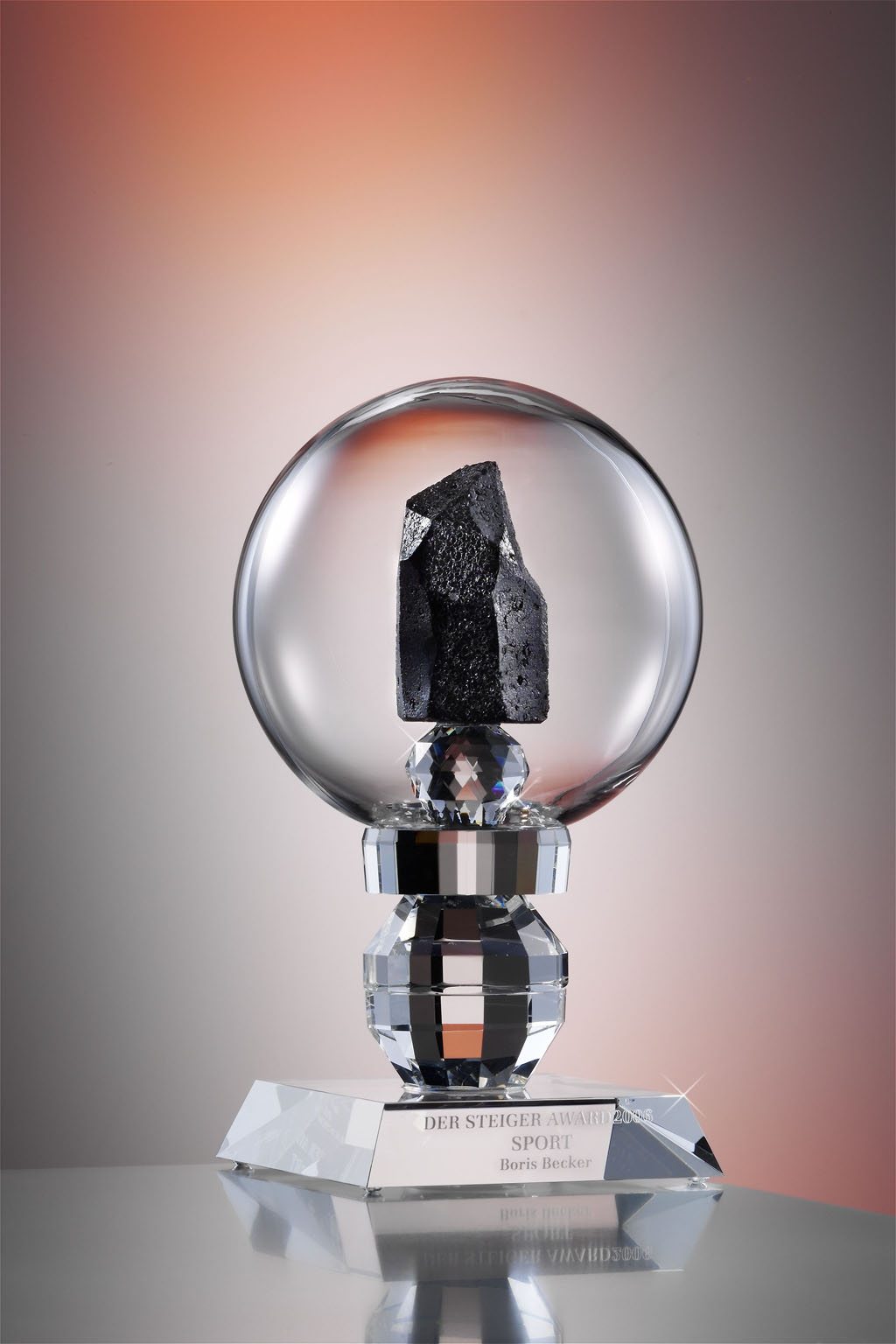

The Steiger Award or Der Steiger is an international award established in 2005 and presented annually by the award organization based in Bochum, Germany. The title refers to steiger (mining foreman), reflecting the qualities of responsibility, honesty, openness and hard work valued in the Ruhr region where the award is presented.

The award was created by private initiative and is presented annually to individuals who are notable for accomplishments in charity, music, film, media, sports, the environment and building of the European community.

Past winners include Nena, Egon Bahr, Udo Jürgens, Jean-Claude Juncker, Boris Becker, David Frost, Bob Geldof, Maximilian Schell, Richard Chamberlain, Stefanie Powers, Robin Gibb, Christopher Lee, Mark Knopfler, Klaus Meine, Roger Daltrey, Jean-Michel Jarre, Bonnie Tyler and Peter Lindbergh.

== Laureates ==
=== 2000s ===
- 2005
- Charity: Farah Pahlavi
- Tolerance: Shimon Peres
- Music: Robin Gibb
- Media: Friedrich Nowottny
- Environment: Franz Alt
- Film: Pierre Brice
- Art: Otmar Alt
- Young: Liel Kolet
- Lifetime Achievement: Bonnie Tyler

2006

- Charity: José Carreras
- Music: Peter Maffay
- Media: Sabine Christiansen
- Environment: Mohamed ElBaradei
- Film: Friedrich von Thun
- Art: James Rizzi
- Sport: Boris Becker
- Europe: Jean-Claude Juncker
- Young: Tokio Hotel
- Lifetime Achievement: Heinz Sielmann

2007

- Charity: Rupert Neudeck
- Tolerance: Hamid Karzai
- Music: Wolfgang Niedecken
- Media: Peter Scholl-Latour
- Environment: Achim Steiner
- Film: Manfred Krug & Iris Berben
- Art: Franz Beckenbauer
- Sport: Hans-Dietrich Genscher
- Europe: US5
- Young: Joachim Fuchsberger
- Political courage: Gabriele Pauli

2008

- Charity: Claudia Cardinale
- Tolerance: Hans Küng
- Music: Udo Jürgens
- Media: Maybrit Illner
- Environment: Erivan Haub
- Film: Dieter Pfaff
- Art: Aliza Olmert
- Sport: Jens Lehmann & Egidius Braun
- Europe: Edmund Stoiber
- Young: Jimi Blue & Wilson Gonzalez Ochsenknecht
- Entertainment: Hape Kerkeling
- Special prize: Hélène Grimaud

2009

- Charity: Maria Teresa, Grand Duchess of Luxembourg
- Tolerance: Roman Herzog
- Music: Bob Geldof
- Media: David Frost
- Film: Veronica Ferres
- Art: Gottfried Helnwein
- Sport: Klaus Steilmann
- Europe: Romano Prodi & Aleksander Kwaśniewski
- Lifetime Achievement: Maximilian Schell
- Entertainment: Dieter Hallervorden

=== 2010s ===
2010

- Charity: Eva Köhler
- Music: Marius Müller-Westernhagen
- Media: Alfred Biolek
- Environment: Claus Hipp
- Film: Armin Mueller-Stahl
- Art: Robert Wilson
- Sport: Haya bint Hussein
- Europe: Boris Tadić
- Young: Christopher Lee

2011

- Charity: Cherie Blair
- Tolerance: Egon Bahr
- Music: Mark Knopfler & Roger Daltrey
- Media: Reinhold Beckmann
- Environment: Stefanie Powers
- Film: Klaus Maria Brandauer
- Art: Frank Gehry
- Sport: Vitali & Wladimir Klitschko
- Europe: José Manuel Barroso
- Lifetime Achievement: Richard Chamberlain

2012

- Charity: Queen Silvia of Sweden
- Tolerance: Horst Köhler
- Music: Lou Reed
- Media: Peter Kloeppel
- Environment: Hannes Jaenicke
- Film: Christine Neubauer
- Art: Wolfgang Joop
- Europe: Recep Tayyip Erdoğan
- Young: Tim Bendzko
- Lifetime Achievement: Christiane Hörbiger
- Ruhr Prize: Steven Sloane

2013

- Tolerance: Kurt Masur
- Music: Scorpions
- Environment: Michael Otto
- Film: Jürgen Prochnow
- Art: Albert Watson
- Sport: Rudi Völler
- Europe: Kurt Biedenkopf & Alfred Grosser
- Young: Liselotte Pulver
- International Music: Jean-Michel Jarre

2014

- Charity: Queen Sofía of Spain
- Tolerance: Karl Lehmann
- Music: Ute Lemper
- Media: Johannes B. Kerner
- Film: Hannelore Hoger
- Sport: German Olympic Sports Confederation
- Lifetime Achievement: Buzz Aldrin
- Ruhr Prize: Hans-Joachim Watzke
- Special prize: Quincy Jones

2019

- Charity: Uschi Glas
- Music: Joris & Santiano
- Media: Anne Will
- Film: Senta Berger & Michael Mendl
- Sport: Andrej Plenković
- Europe: Lukas Rieger
- Young: Heino
- Ruhr Prize: Jürgen Großmann
