= Terra X =

German documentary TV series brand

A video by Terra X about climate factors (English subtitle)

Terra X is a brand used by the German public broadcaster ZDF since 2008. Between 1982 and 2008, the brand name was ZDF Expedition. Some topics under the brand Terra X are documentaries about history, nature, archaeology and science. The documentaries are broadcast on ZDF. Repeats are also broadcast on ZDFinfo, ZDFneo, Phoenix, Arte and 3sat.

== Background ==
On 17 January 1982, the first ZDF Expedition documentary was broadcast. In 2008, the name was changed to Terra X. The brand includes documentary series, where a topic will be covered deeper than in usual documentaries. Since the mid 1980s simulations of the past are included for visualization and since the 1990s some historical events are re-enacted with actors.

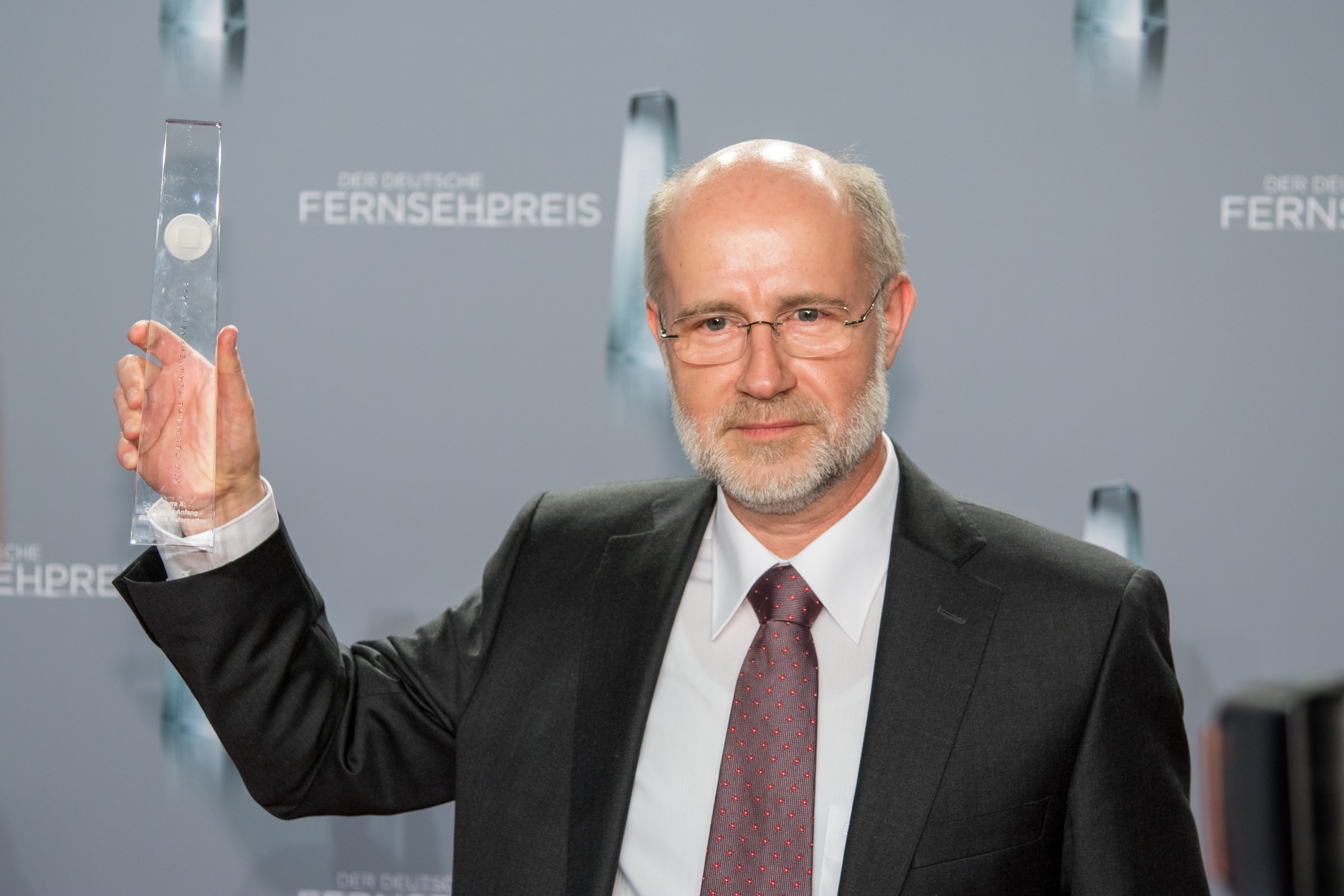
Harald Lesch receiving the Deutscher Fernsehpreis in 2018

Over 40 documentaries are produced per year under the brand of Terra X. The average cost of a 45-minute-film amounts to €250,000. The documentaries of Terra X are sold and broadcast internationally, for example in National Geographic Channel in the United States.

Terra X is also active on the internet. Beside the ZDF video on demand platform ZDFmediathek, they are publishing documentaries and clips on platforms like YouTube. The Terra X Lesch & Co channel presented by Harald Lesch was launched on 3 February 2016. Later that year, their YouTube channel Terra X Natur & Geschichte started on 15 August, where Terra X is publishing full documentaries that are also airing on TV. During the COVID-19 pandemic, Terra X started the YouTube channel Terra X statt Schule (Terra X Instead of School), where they are publishing different knowledge videos of content that has been already broadcast. In 2019, Terra X published some clips about the topic climate under CC BY 4.0, so that the clips can be also used in Wikipedia.
