= Christoph Süß =

German cabaret artist and TV presenter

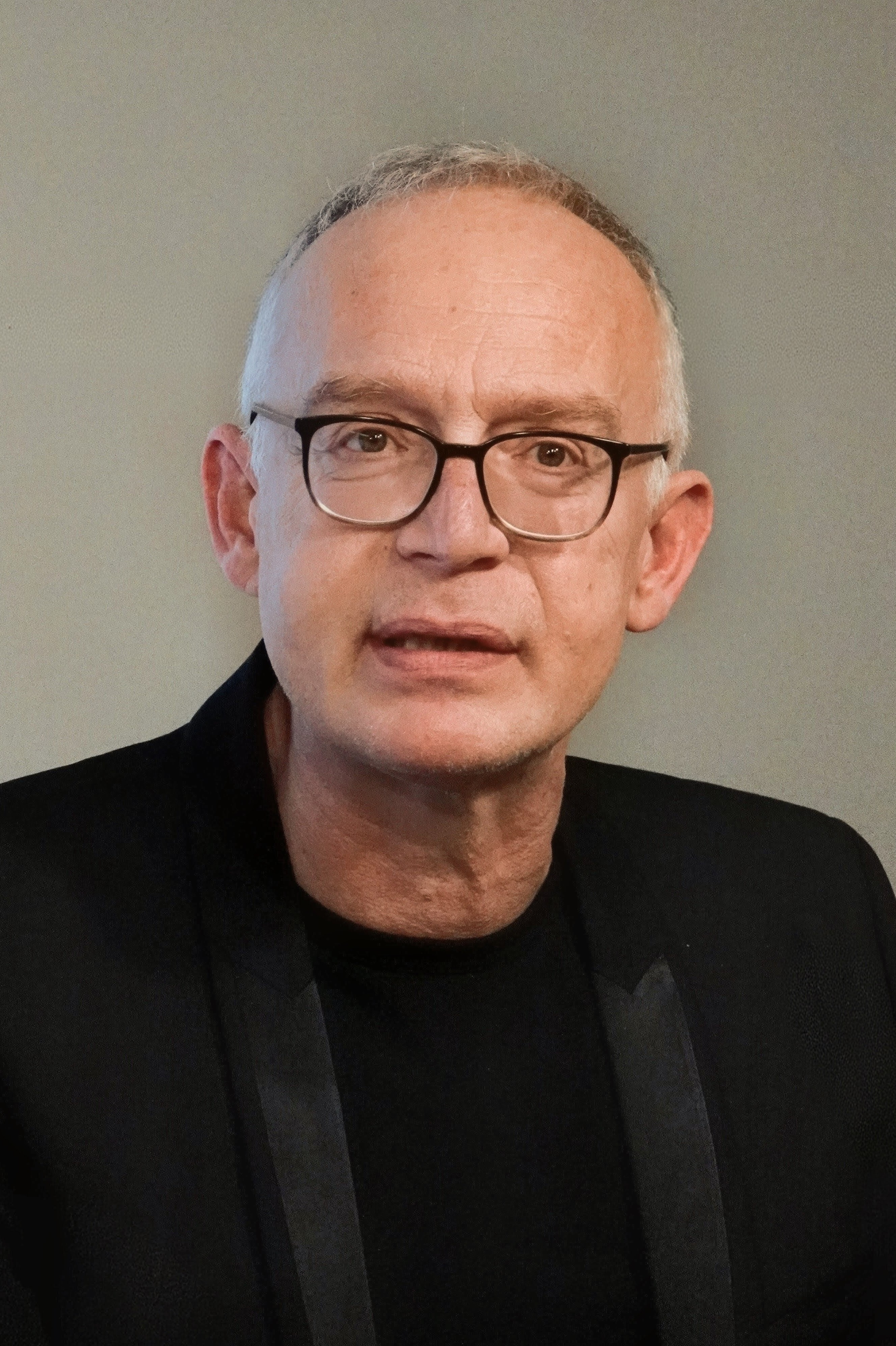
Christoph Süß 2025

Christoph Süß (born December 17, 1967) is a German cabaret artist and television presenter.

== Life ==
A native of the Sendling area of Munich, Süß gained his first experiences in theatre while in secondary school, performing in school plays, in amateur theatre troupes, and as a singer in several rock bands. After graduation, he enrolled in 1990 at LMU Munich to study philosophy, but eventually dropped out to concentrate on his developing career as a cabaret artist.

In 1995, Süß began his first stint of solo performances, appearing in small art theatres in his native Munich and around Bavaria. In 1998, he was hired by Bayerischer Rundfunk to present the weekly politics and satire magazine "Quer". He continued his solo performances, going on tour in 1999 with his new program "Kristofs kleiner Kosmos" ("Kristof's Small Cosmos"). For this program he won the Obernburger Mühlstein prize given to independent artists for cabaret and comedy performance.
