= LfA Förderbank Bayern =

German regional promotional bank

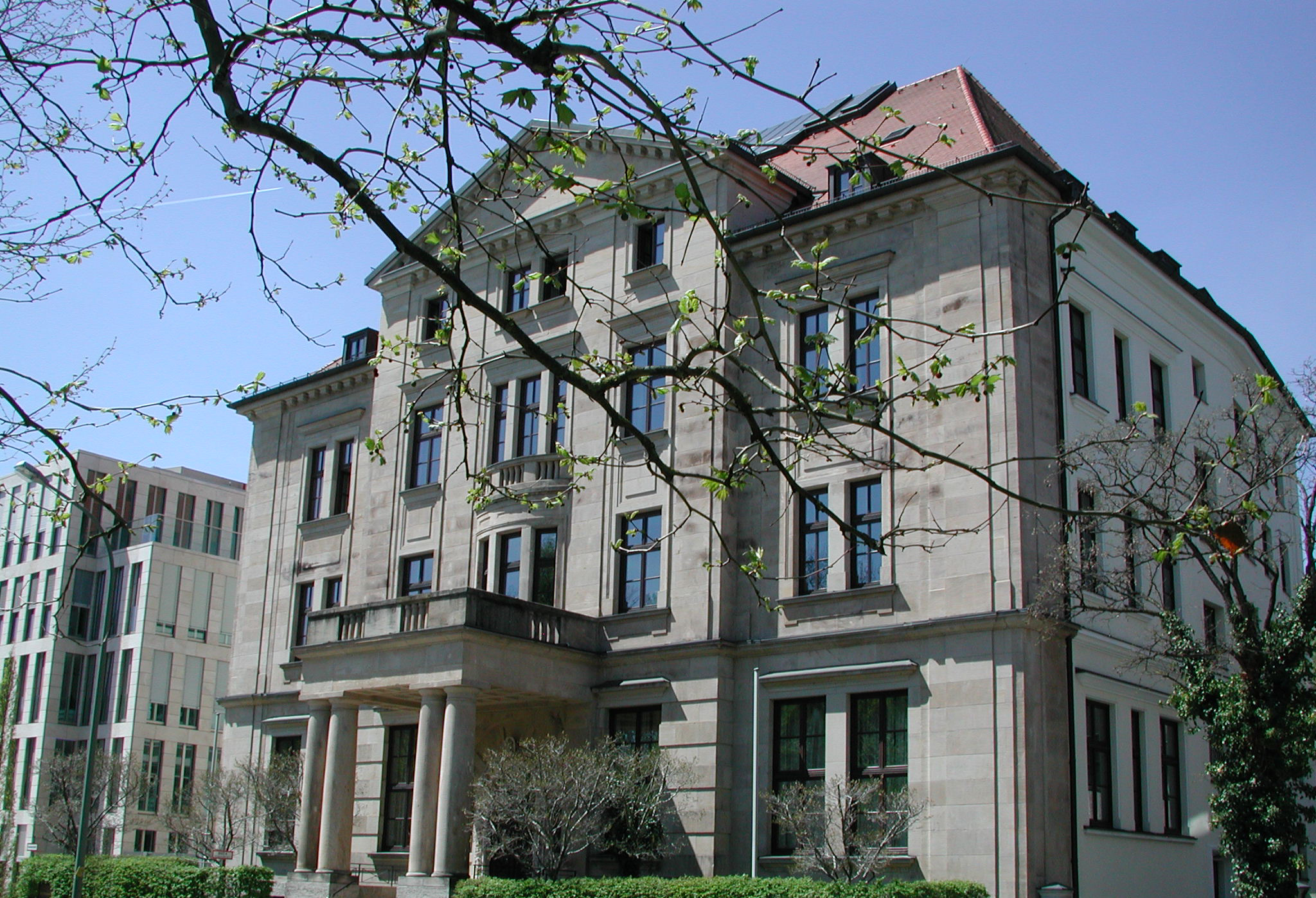
- LfA head office at Königinstraße 17 in Munich
- Company type: State owned enterprise
- Industry: Financial services
- Founded: May 1, 1951; 74 years ago
- Headquarters: Munich, Germany
- Area served: Bavaria
- Products: Loans, development loans
- Owner: Bavarian state government
- Number of employees: 333 (2015)
- Website: www.lfa.de

LfA Förderbank Bayern is a German regional development bank (German: Förderbank) for the German state of Bavaria. It was established by law of 7 December 1950, initially as Landesanstalt für Aufbaufinanzierung (LfA), which makes it the oldest of the Förderbanken. It is headquartered in Munich.

== History ==
LfA started operations on 1 May 1951. It provides financing for start-ups, environmental protection, and other areas deemed of public interest. It does not compete with commercial banks but co-lends or co-invests with them and provides guarantees. It also controls investment companies, namely BayBG Bayerische Beteiligungsgesellschaft mbH and Bayern Kapital GmbH.

In July 2021, the latter was entrusted with the management of a €200 million scale-up fund at the initiative of the Bavarian state government.

== Operations ==
Together with other Förderbanken and the more commercially oriented Landesbanken, LfA Förderbank Bayern is a member of the Association of German Public Banks (VÖB). Since September 2023, it has been a member of the United Nations Global Compact.

== See also ==
- KfW
- German public banking sector
- List of banks in Germany
