= Thea Dorn =

German author, TV moderator and literary critic

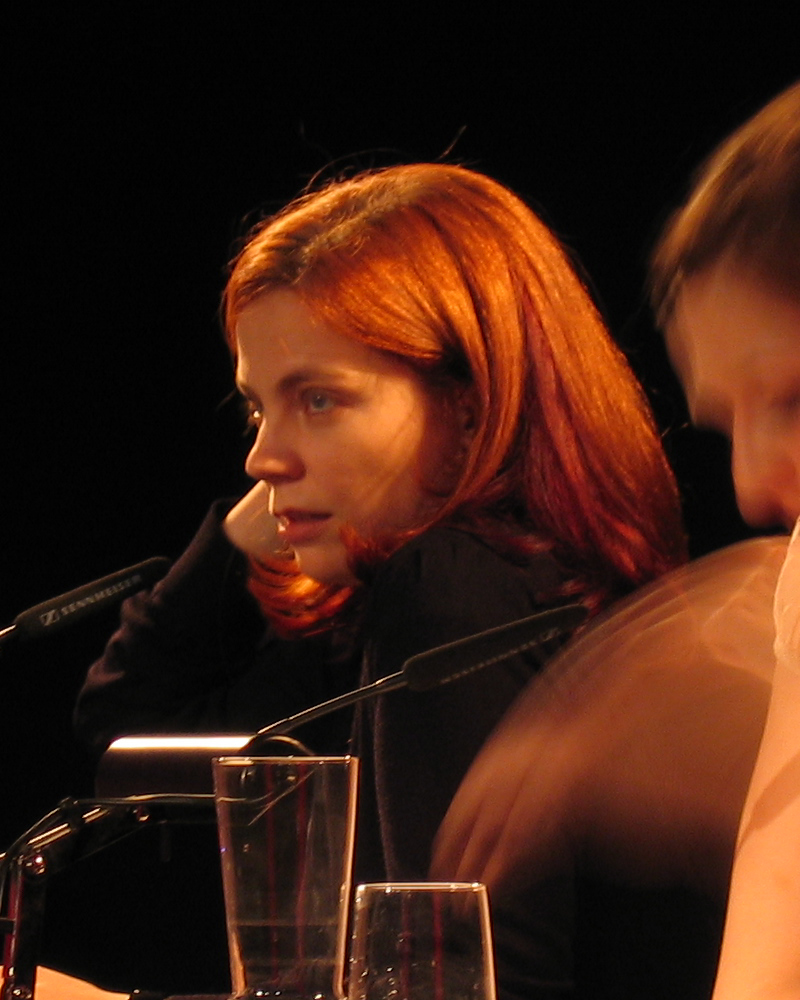
Thea Dorn, 2008

Thea Dorn (pseudonym; Christiane Scherer, born 23 July 1970 in Offenbach am Main) is a German writer of crime fiction and TV host. She lives and works in Berlin.

Born in Offenbach am Main, Dorn was initially trained as a singer, and later studied philosophy and theatrical sciences in Frankfurt and Berlin. She graduated (Magistra) in philosophy with a work on self-deception. She worked as scientific assistant at the Free University of Berlin, then as dramaturge and writer at the Staatstheater Hannover. Thea Dorn's pseudonym alludes to Theodor Adorno, whose works she read and found hard to understand. (See the interview on Adorno.) After receiving her M. A. in philosophy, she became a freelance writer.

In 1995 she released her first book, Berliner Aufklärung, for which she received the Marlowe Prize. For her third book, Die Hirnkönigin, she received the German Crime Fiction Prize 2000. The same year she wrote the theatrical piece Marleni, a staged meeting of Marlene Dietrich and Leni Riefenstahl. This drama premiered on 15 January 2000 in Hamburg at the Deutsches Schauspielhaus.

In 2003 she wrote the script to the episode Der schwarze Troll (lit. The black troll) of the German TV series Tatort. The next year, with the book Die Brut, she left the genre of crime fiction and concentrated on characterisations of the milieu. {WP:OR}?

Beginning with 2003 together with Dirk Schümer she was host of the TV show Schümer und Dorn – Der Büchertalk, broadcast by Südwestrundfunk. Since 2004 she hosts the TV show Literatur im Foyer, presenting new books and talking to writers.

She lives in Berlin, has a brother and parents.
