= Ralph Caspers =

German television presenter, author, screenwriter and actor

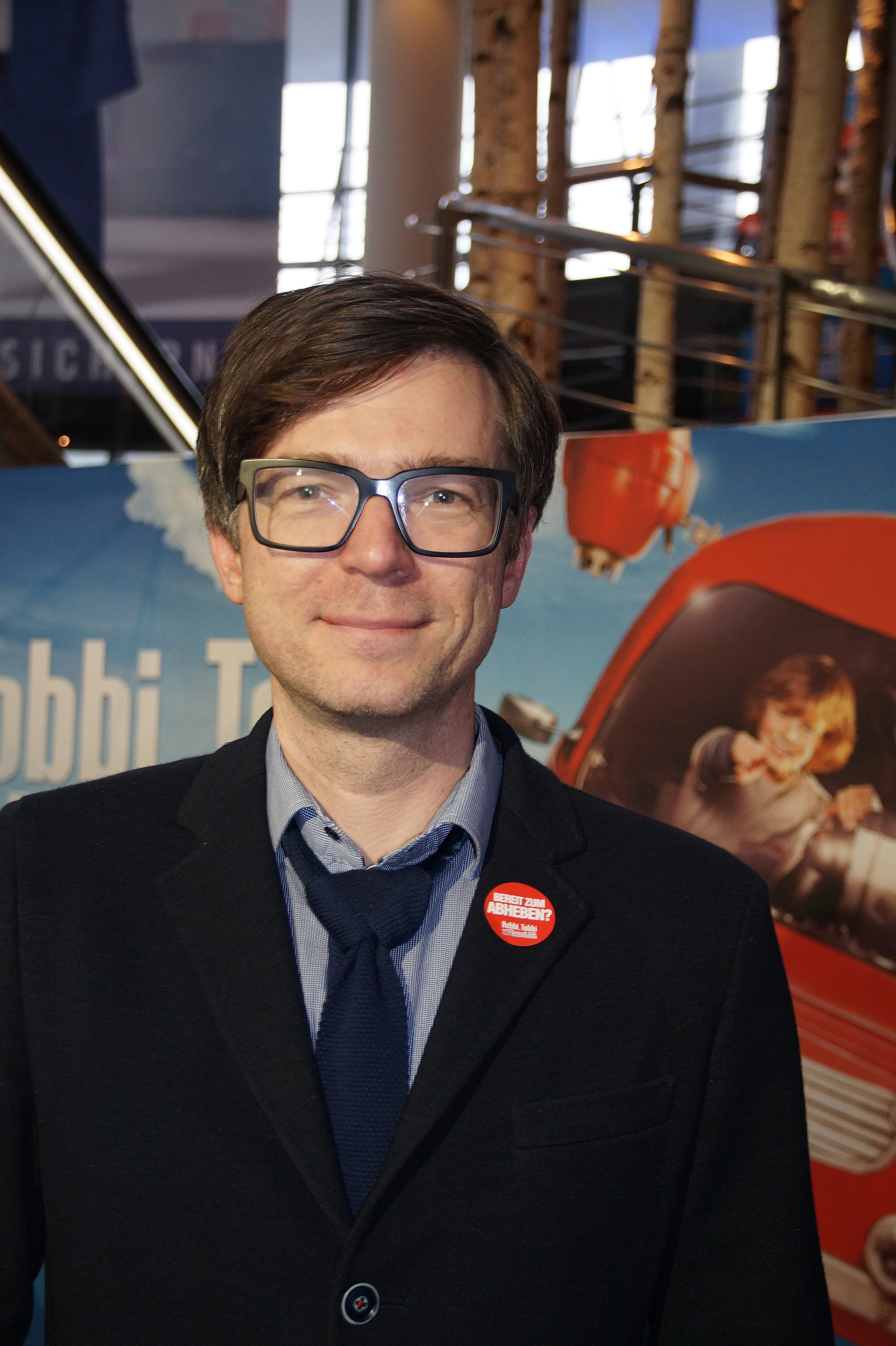
- Ralph Caspers at the premiere of Robbi, Tobbi und das Fliewatüüt in Cologne (2016)
- Born: 18 January 1972 (age 54); Pasir Panjang, Borneo, Indonesia
- Occupations: Actor, producer

Ralph Caspers (born 18 January 1972 in Pasir Panjang, Borneo, Indonesia) is a German television presenter, author, screenwriter, and actor.

== Biography ==
Ralph Caspers was born in the Indonesian part of the island of Borneo, where his parents had emigrated before his birth to help the relief organization Orangutan Foundation International (OFI) raise orangutans in Tanjung Puting National Park. When his mother got pregnant again, they moved back to Germany in 1975. After his parents divorced in 1977, he and his sister first lived with their father, and later with their mother. When Caspers was 15 years old, his father died. He grew up in Berlin-Spandau, Caracas (Venezuela), on the Amazon, in Ehrenfeld, and in the Rhein-Sieg-Kreis. After graduating from the Antoniuskolleg in Neunkirchen-Seelscheid in 1991, Caspers, who originally wanted to become a designer, worked in pathology, in an advertising agency, as well as in various TV production companies. He did his community service in Bonn-Tannenbusch, where he worked in individual care for severely disabled children. From 1997 to 2002, he studied at the Academy of Media Arts Cologne.

Caspers is married to film editor Nina Caspers, with whom he lives in Cologne. He is the father of two sons and a daughter. In a video for the television program Quarks, it was revealed that Caspers suffers from face blindness and, as a result, was afraid that he would not recognize his newborn child.

Caspers has been one of the German ambassadors of the United Nations Decade on Biodiversity since November 2011. Furthermore, he supports the U18 election project as an ambassador. The U18 project aims to introduce children and adolescents to the topics of politics, elections and democracy by allowing them to symbolically cast their vote before state or federal elections.

Caspers is also a brand ambassador for Klexikon, which is an online encyclopedia for children. At the 2022 re:publica, a conference that deals with the Web 2.0, he stated that he "appreciates Klexikon as a Wikipedia for Kids, because some articles there are really complex."

== Career ==
After completing his civilian service in pathology and working in a slaughterhouse and a marketing agency, he completed several internships in TV production. Later Caspers participated in the Sat.1 production "Geh aufs Ganze!", where he created the games for the show. During that time Caspers' talent was discovered by Super RTL and with "Muuh – Das Tiermagazin" he was given his first own show in 1995.

Caspers started to work for the WDR (Westdeutscher Rundfunk) in 1996 and hosted the "Maus Club" alongside Shary Reeves and Tina Halverscheid until 2000. From 1997 to 2002 Caspers studied at the Kunsthochschule für Medien Köln (KMH). His diploma thesis dealt with the development of a television series and aired under the name "Late Morgen" on 16. Februar 2003 at Das Erste. "Late Morgen" was the first and only late-night show for kids that aired in the morning.

In 1999, Caspers started hosting the popular and educational children's tv show Die Sendung mit der Maus ("The show with the mouse") and in September of that year also took part in its production in rotation with Armin Maiwald and Christoph Biemann. On the occasions of the show's birthday, Caspers has often gone abroad. Locations include Japan (Tokyo) in 2005, Turkey (Ankara) in 2008, India (New Delhi) in 2009, South Africa (Pretoria/Tshwane) in 2010, Brazil (Brasília) in 2012, Greece (Athena) in 2023, Iceland (Reykjavík) in 2014, Poland (Warsaw) in 2016, the UK (London) in 2017, France (Paris) in 2019, and Denmark (Copenhagen) in 2020. He also visited the Aardman Studios in Bristol (England), where the tv-series of Shaun the Sheep is produced, that is also part of the show Die Sendung mit der Maus. While going on these journeys, Caspers kept diary about his experiences, which is still available on the show's website (https://www.wdrmaus.de/extras/ralphs_tagebuecher.php5).

From 1999 to 2002, Caspers ran his own talk show for kids on the children's channel KiKA called QuasselCaspers. From 2001 to 2022, he moderated the popular children's science magazine Wissen macht Ah! and sometimes scripted it as well. Between 2003 and 2004 his reportage-magazine Neufundland ("Newfoundland") was broadcast additionally on special occasions. In this magazine he moderated from behind a wheel of a golden limousine from the 1970's. There are 5 episodes in total with each 30 minutes. Also, he is one of the experts in the children's quiz show Frag doch mal die Maus ("Just ask the mouse"), which is connected to the show Die Sendung mit der Maus.

In the course of the campaign WDR Kinderwelt ("children’s world of the WDR") for children's media education, Caspers produced the visitor film Die wunderbare Welt des WDR – eine Reise durch Fernsehen, Radio und Internet ("the wonderful world of the WDR – a journey through tv, radio and internet").

This film (about 18 minutes long) was broadcast on 12 December 2009 on the WDR and since the 16 December 2009 it is shown to visitors of the "WDR Kinderstudios" in Köln. Since 2010, Caspers moderates the WDR tv-show Quarks substitutional; from 2019 to 2021 taking turns with Mai Thi Nguyen-Kim and after that with Florence Randrianarisoa. Since Novembre 2022, Caspers is the face of the YouTube-channel „Quarks Dimension Ralph". Caspers' first book "Wissen macht Ah!" was published in September 2004. Since 2011, he presented the show Du bist kein Werwolf – Über Leben in der Pubertät (You are not a Werewolf – Living through puberty) together with Christine Henning on the German Tv-Channel KiKA. He worked with Dieter Nuhr on the quiz show Null gewinnt (Zero wins) between July 2012 and early 2013. Caspers had an acting role in the 2016 children's film adaptation of Robbi, Tobbi und das Fliewatüüt.

In late July 2022, it was announced that Ralph Caspers would be leaving the show Wissen macht Ah! after more than 21 years. Since September 2022, Tarkan Bagci and Clarissa Corrêa da Silva present the show.

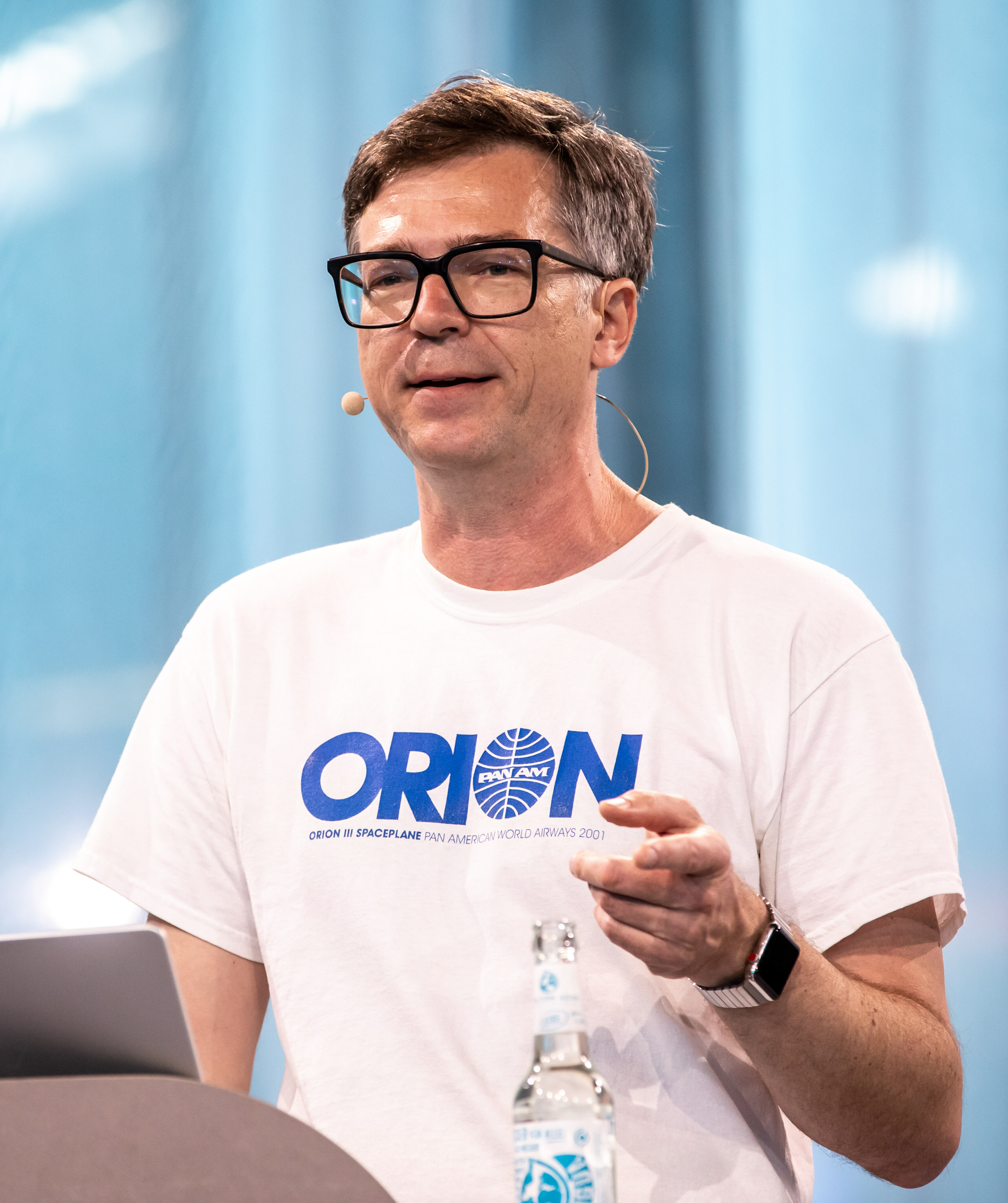
Ralph Caspers at the re:publica 2022

Since April 2024, he has been part of the expert trio, alongside Marwa Eldessouky and Jens Riewa, on the quiz show Frag mich was Leichteres!.

== Personal life ==
=== Date of Birth ===
He claims that he does not know the exact date of his birth, citing that he only received a birth certificate in Germany. On 21 February 2010, while airing on the show Zimmer frei!, he called this statement "nonsense".

=== Date of Death: 25 August 2023 ===
According to statements made on the WDR-2-Show Paternoster Caspers tried to see how easy it would be to fake his own death. He contacted the Kölner Stadtanzeiger to create an obituary for himself and added a date of death to his Wikipedia page.

== Presenting career ==
- since 1999: Die Sendung mit der Maus, Das Erste (produced by WDR)
- 2001–2022: Wissen macht Ah!, Das Erste and KiKA (produced by WDR)
- since 2010: Quarks, WDR
- since 2010: Frag doch mal die Maus (Maus-Experte), Das Erste
- since 2015: Lokalzeit extra, WDR (Commentary)
- since 2022: Quarks Dimension Ralph; a Quarks channel on YouTube

== Awards ==
- Prix Jeunesse International 2002 for „Können Schweine schwimmen?" from Sendung mit der Maus.
- Emil (Kinderfernsehpreis) 2008 for presenting several shows
- For the Goldener Spatz, Ralph Caspers and Alina Freund were awarded best presenters in 2009
- Erich-Kästner-Fernsehpreis 2010 for the South Africa-Special in Sendung mit der Maus.
- Silver Screen Award in Los Angeles.
- Kinderfernsehpreis of the Robert-Geisendörfer-Preises 2011 together with Katja Engelhardt the South Africa-Special in Sendung mit der Maus
- Grimme-Preis 2012 for Du bist kein Werwolf
- Emil (Kinderfernsehpreis) 2012 for Du bist kein Werwolf
- Brillenträger des Jahres 2017
- Order of Merit of the Federal Republic of Germany for his commitment to education in 2019
- Journalistenpreis 2023 of the German Mathematical Society for the Video „Kann die Natur Mathe?" (with Jens Hahne and Ingo Knopf)
