= Wissen macht Ah! =

German educational television programme

- Genre: Entertainment, science journalism
- Presented by: Clarissa Corrêa da Silva (since 2018); Tarkan Bagci (since 2022); Shary Reeves (2001-2017); Ralph Caspers (2001-2022)
- Theme music composer: The Pastels
- Opening theme: One Wild Moment (Stereolab Remix)
- Country of origin: Germany
- Original language: German
- No. of series: 15
- No. of episodes: 462+

Production
- Running time: 25 minutes (inc. adverts)
- Production companies: WDR Köln; tvision GmbH

Original release
- Network: KiKa / WDR
- Release: 21 April 2001.

Wissen macht Ah! is a German television programme produced by WDR. It was first broadcast in Germany on 21 April 2001 on The First channel (das Erste) and simultaneously on KiKA. The regularly broadcast 25-minute science journalism program is primarily aimed at children aged eight and over, but also appeals to many adults because of the humorous tone of the presenters. Over the course of the show's history, Shary Reeves, Clarissa Corrêa da Silva, Ralph Caspers and Tarkan Bagci have been presenters.

The programme's motto is: "Being a smartass with Tarkan and Clari" ("Klugscheißen mit Tarkan und Clari"). Its previous motto was: "Being a smartass with Shary and Ralph" ("Klugscheißen mit Shary und Ralph"). On average, over 400,000 viewers watch the show every week, with individual programmes on KiKA reaching up to 900,000 viewers. Ulrike Müller-Haupt was initially responsible for editing the programme. In 2012, those editing responsibilities were taken over by Hilla Stadtbäumer and in 2021, she was joined in this role by Christoph Reyer. After a total of 16 years, presenter Shary Reeves announced her departure from the programme in June 2017. In 2018, Clarissa Corrêa da Silva took over as presenter alongside Ralph Caspers. In September 2022, Tarkan Bagci took over Ralph Casper's presenter role.

== Concept of the show ==
According to its creators, Wissen macht Ah! is a show for know-it-alls. The two presenters guide the audience through episodes made up of video sequences alongside experiments live in the studio. In every episode, four to five everyday questions like "Where does the word 'slapstick' come from?" or "How do cyclists in the Tour de France go to the bathroom?" are answered. The show's special feature is the use of descriptive puns as transitions between different segments within an episode.

Episodes sometimes only cover one topic, for example kings. Some episodes also show a special opening such as all in black and white, displaying a very colorful logo or an introduction that was interrupted in the middle. Until 2010, the closing credits showed the official ARD credits. Since 2011 the closing credits showed the ARD Copyright instead.

== Library ==
The online library offers background information on keywords sorted alphabetically. There are explanations for idiomatic expressions and sayings (for example draw the ass card.), as well as for phenomena (for example what is a fever?), processes (for example how does soap wash?) and background knowledge of terms (for example Greek columns). There are also experiments and trials (for instance overcoming gravity and water experiments), craft instructions (for instance building your own hole siren), instructions for observations (for example observing insect larvae) and strange recipes like "Making your own blood". The experiments and instructions are available online. Entries that deal with a similar topic or content are also displayed next to the respective main entry and can be clicked on directly. Curiosities and the "splendid experiment" (German: Das famose Experiment) have their own subsections and can be found separately within the library.

== Online offers ==
=== Further content ===
- The rubric home cinema (Heimkino) offers numerous episodes starting from 2004, as well as short episodes of Mini-Ah and many episodes in podcast form.
- Gaming and adventure, navigation and tact, solving riddles, puzzles and of course discovering new knowledge are all focus points of the app.
- For true fans, the app not only offers information on the moderators and creators of Wissen Macht Ah! in its Team rubric, but also autographed cards that can be purchased.

== Mini Ah! ==
Since 2008, the three minute long Mini Ah! episodes act as a gap filler, answering questions such as "Why isn't there a capital ß?", presenting poems like Schimpfonade by Hans Adolf Halbey or even demonstrating a "gymnastic exercise" they call "The Song of the Whales" (den Gesang der Wale). The Mini Ah! posts are available online.

== Books, calendars and magazines ==
Between 2011 and 2023, five books were published under the same name as the show by Loewe-Verlag:

- GENIAh!L – Phänomenale Erfindungen mit Shary und Ralph
- EXPLOSIONSGEFAh!R – Famose Experimente mit Shary und Ralph
- MAh!LZEIT – Lecker essen mit Shary und Ralph
- WUNDERBAh!R – Verblüffende Alltagsphänomene mit Shary und Ralph
- Ah!-Sagen. Der Menschliche Körper (Edited by Dr Mohsen "Mo" Radjai, D. Mendlewitsch, Christine Gerber)

A calendar, "Wissen macht AH!, Broschürenkalender", was published in 2007. From October 2007 to January 2009, a monthly magazine by the name of "Wissen macht Ah! - The magazine for know-it-all's" (Wissen macht Ah! - Das Magazin für Klugscheißer) was published in addition to the broadcast by the Konradin media group.

== DVDs ==
There are four DVDs of the show available that contain video sequences from different episodes covering the four elements water, earth, fire, and air. For these DVDs, a few new video sequences were filmed and added. The show also released two podcasts, Wissen macht Ah! and Mini Ah, in which the audience can listen to the episodes that were broadcast on TV.

== Late night edition ==
In August 2006, three late night editions (Spätausgaben) were broadcast on the WDR Fernsehen (regional TV program of North Rhine-Westphalia). These episodes were devoted to more adult themes and questions. They were shown at around 10:00 p.m. and lasted 45 minutes, instead of the usual 25. In each episode, a special guest was brought in. The guests were Dolly Buster, Christine Urspruch and Sven Plöger.

Additionally, a pilot with Franziska Reichenbacher was shown at the Einsfestival in April 2007.

Questions that were asked included "Why does one get morning wood?" or "How do hangovers happen?"

== International version ==
Wissen macht Ah! can be viewed on Deutsche Welle or with subtitles on the French channel Canal+ in 138 countries, islands and archipelagos.

=== Why? Wei shen me 为什么 (China) ===
The program has also been broadcast in China with the title Why? Wei shen me 为什么 by 35 Chinese television stations since 2005 (TV Alliance editor: Shuanghong Huang). A part of the studio in Beijing was made to look like the original studio in Germany. The films will be translated from German into Chinese and presented by the two presenters Chen Huaijie and Chen Yan Xu.

=== Znaj-kA! Знай-ка! (Russia) ===
Since 28 September 2007, Wissen macht Ah! can also be seen in Russia under the title Znaj-kA! (Russian for know-it-all). Similar to the Chinese version, the clips are translated from German into Russian; there is a replica Ah! studio in Moscow with Oleg Bilik and Vera Charkova as the presenters. The program plays on the state-run Russian youth channel Bibigon.
