= Ranga Yogeshwar =

Luxembourgish television presenter and author

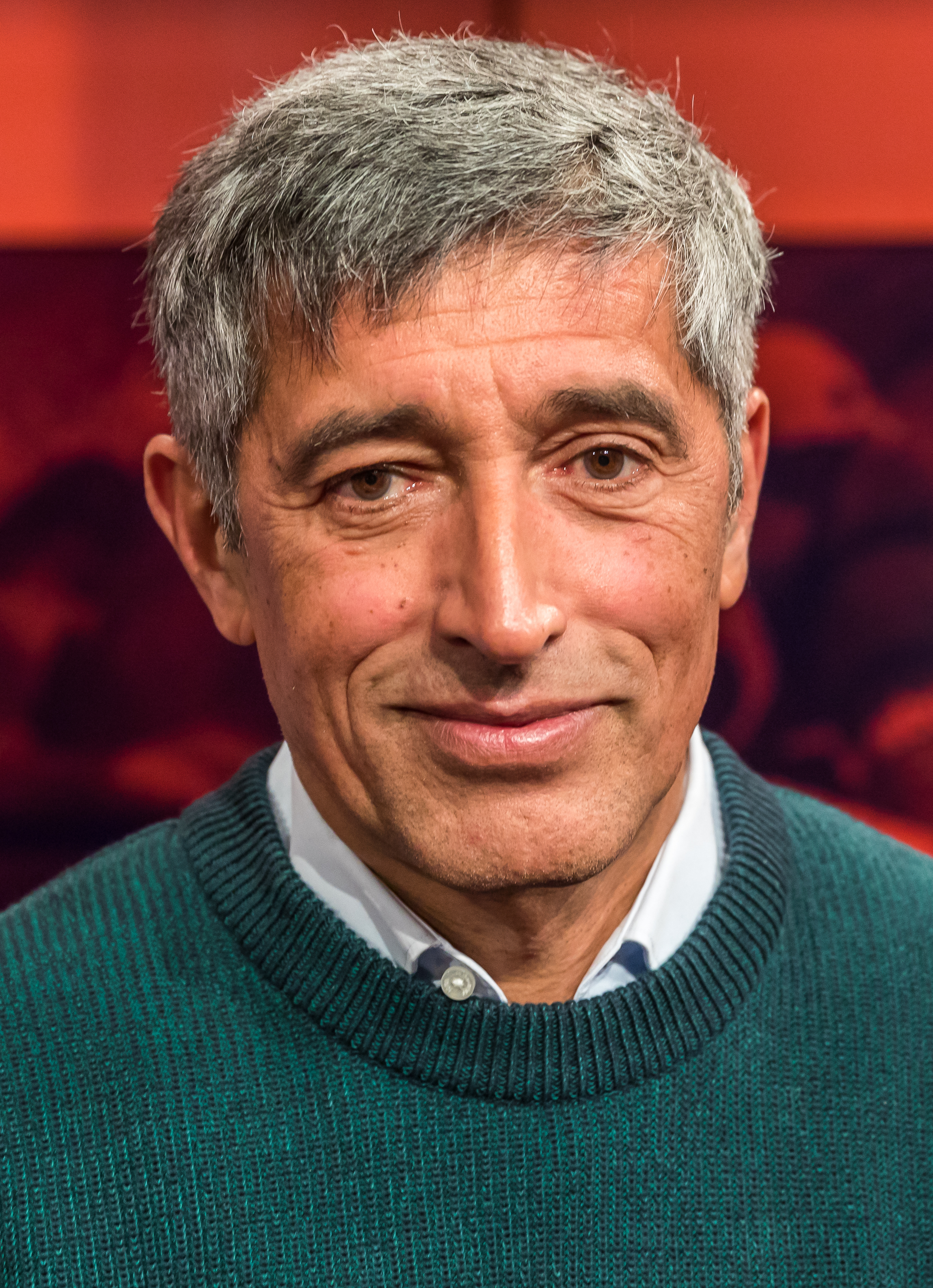
- Yogeshwar in 2023
- Born: Ranganathan Gregoire Yogeshwar; 18 May 1959 (age 67); Luxembourg
- Occupations: Physicist, science journalist
- Spouse: Uschi
- Children: 4
- Website: yogeshwar.de

Ranganathan Gregoire Yogeshwar (born 18 May 1959) is a Luxembourgish physicist and science journalist based in Germany. He started gaining attention at the end of the 1980s in the German-speaking area for his science documentaries that were often coupled with critical analysis and prognoses of the societal effects of research in the natural sciences.

== Early life and education ==
Yogeshwar grew up in Bangalore, India, and Luxembourg and went to primary school in both places. His father is an Indian engineer and his mother a Luxembourgish art historian. He has a younger sister and a twin brother, Pierre Kalyana Yogeshwar, who is also a physicist. His grandfather was mathematician and librarian S. R. Ranganathan, the developer of the colon classification. Growing up, he spoke Luxembourgish, German, French, English, Tamil, Kannada, Hindi and Malayalam (the latter three to communicate with his housekeeper, teacher, and gardener, respectively).

Yogeshwar studied music in Luxembourg and obtained his Diplôme de fin d’études secondaires (equivalent to British A-Levels) at the Lycée classique de Diekirch. He studied at the RWTH Aachen in Aachen, Germany, graduating with a Diplom degree in experimental physics. He worked at the Swiss Institute for Nuclear Research (SIN), at CERN, both in Switzerland and at the Forschungszentrum Jülich in Germany.

== Career ==
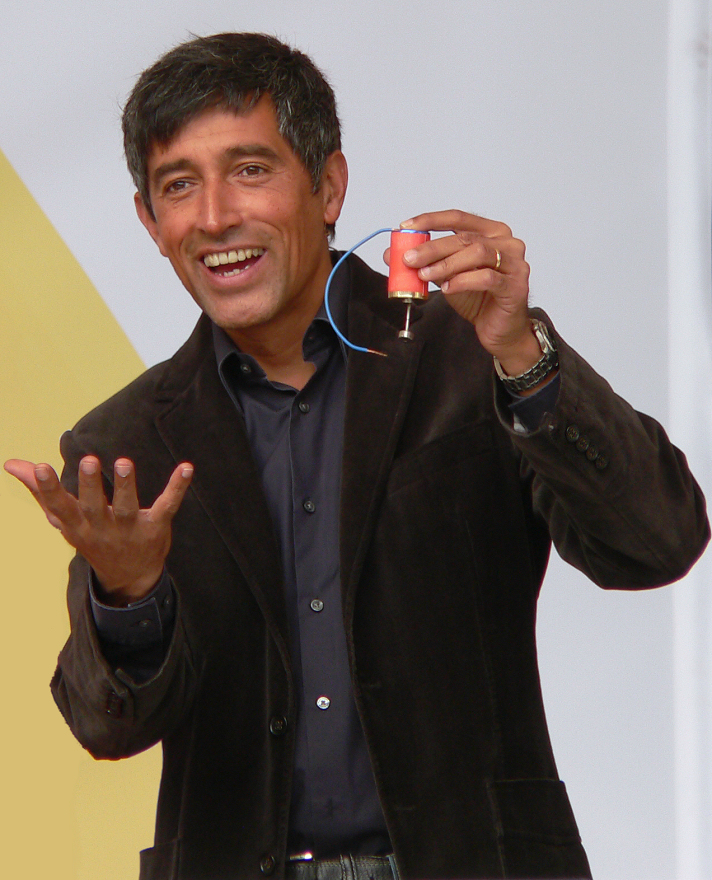
Yogeshwar in 2011

In 1983, he started working in radio and television for various stations. During a stay in India in 1985, he led a series of seminars and conferences, including one at the Indian Institute of Science in Bangalore.

Yogeshwar began to work with Jean Pütz at the Westdeutscher Rundfunk (WDR) in Cologne in 1987 as science editor. Until 1990 he hosted many episodes of the Wissenschaftsshow alongside Pütz. The WDR developed the show Quarks und Co. for Yogeshwar, based on the same concept as the Wissenschaftsshow, and he led this show from 1993 to 2018, before handing it over to Mai Thi Nguyen-Kim and Ralph Caspers. From 1989 to 1999, he co-hosted the TV show Kopfball. From 1995 to 2001, he was the acting Head of the Science Programmes division of the WDR, and in 2001, he replaced Alfred Thorwarth as the head of the same division, remaining in that post till 2018. Until 2002, he presented the research and environmental magazine Globus and the show W wie Wissen from 2006 to 2007 on ARD. He also moderates the series of events Wissenschaft live organised by the Deutsches Museum Bonn. Yogeshwar organises parts of the kids radio show Lillipuz.

== Personal life ==
Yogeshwar and his wife Uschi live with their four children in Hennef near Bonn. He is an atheist.
