= Randrianarisoa =

Randrianarisoa is a surname. Notable people with the surname include:

- Florence Randrianarisoa, German television presenter
- Gervais Randrianarisoa (born 1984), Malagasy footballer
- Guy Randrianarisoa (born 1962), Malagasy businessman and politician
