= Bibliothek der Sachgeschichten =

- Created by: Armin Maiwald
- Country of origin: Germany

Original release
- Network: Das Erste
- Release: 1992

Bibliothek der Sachgeschichten (Library of Factual Stories) is a long-running German news series, broadcast since 1992.

In the series, Armin Maiwald presents his "Sachgeschichten" from the Sendung mit der Maus. Between the clips, he often explains the backgrounds of the production and why this particular question was asked.

== See also ==
- Die Sendung mit der Maus
- List of German television series
