= Quarks (TV series) =

German educational television programme

- Genre: Entertainment, science journalism
- Created by: Ranga Yogeshwar
- Presented by: Ranga Yogeshwar (1993-2018); Mai Thi Nguyen-Kim (2018-2021); Ralph Caspers (Since 2010)
- Country of origin: Germany
- Original language: German

Production
- Running time: 45 minutes (inc. adverts)
- Production companies: WDR Köln; tvision GmbH

Original release
- Network: WDR
- Release: 14 April 1993.

Quarks is a German television programme produced by WDR. It was first broadcast in Germany on 14 April 1993. The regularly broadcast 45-minute science journalism program is primarily aimed at children aged eight and over, but also appeals to many adults because of the humorous tone of the presenters. Over the course of the show's history, Ranga Yogeshwar, Mai Thi Nguyen-Kim, and Florence Randrianarisoa have presented the show.
