= Kikaninchen =

2009 German children's television series

- KiKANiNCHEN
- Genre: Entertainment
- Presented by: Christian Bahrmann; Stefanie Bock
- Starring: Julia Becker; Naemi Simon (motion capture)
- Voices of: Maximiliane Häcke (Kikaninchen)
- Country of origin: Germany
- Original language: German

Production
- Running time: ~3 minutes
- Production company: Studio.TV.Film / KiKa
- Budget: €18,600 per 3 minute sequence

Original release
- Network: KiKa
- Release: October 5, 2009. – present

Kikaninchen (Original: KiKANiNCHEN) is a German TV show broadcast on KiKa. The show is targeted toward children between three and six years of age.

== Television show ==
The show is named after its main character, the Kikaninchen, a 3D model of a blue bunny that can talk, voiced by Maximiliane Häcke. The name is a play on words using name of the TV network, KiKa, and the German word for bunny, Kaninchen. Since the creation of the show, Kikaninchen has been hosted by Christian, played by Christian Bahrmann. Since 2012, the character Jule has been played by Julia Becker with Anni, voiced by Stefanie Bock, joining as a co-host in 2014.

KiKa has broadcast the show weekly from Monday to Friday since 5 October 2009. Originally, the show ran from 6:50 a.m. to 10:25 a.m. After 6 October 2014, it was televised from 6:10 a.m onwards. On 5 February 2018 the show moved its segment Vorschulstrecke 10 minutes forward and has since broadcast from 6.00 a.m. to 10.15 a.m. In this segment, the Kikaninchen guides the audience through different pre-school programs, including children’s series like Au Schwarte!, Die Sendung mit dem Elefanten (The Program with the Elephant) and Kleine Prinzessin (Little Princess). Sequences with the Kikaninchen are between one and three minutes long. These sequences cost €18,600 on average.

Kikaninchen is produced by Studio.TV.Film GmbH in collaboration with KiKA and represents a combination of Computer-generated imagery, real film sequences, and animation. Patrick Schlosser, Ute Hilgefort, and Manuela Stacke direct the television show. The producers are Katrin Grondahl and Helga Löbel. The voice actor for the role of Kikaninchen is Maximiliane Häcke. Since 7 November 2022 the stories take place in a three-dimensional setting. In this process, the Kikaninchen figure is not added later, but instead embodied by the actress Naemi Simon using motion capture. The Kikaninchen is also present at children's events in mascot form, alongside other beloved KiKa mascots.

== Other media ==
The TV show has a webpage targeted towards preschool children. It contains every TV broadcast on Kikaninchen and offers colouring pages and games for each episode. Additionally, it provides videos of the Kikaninchen, his friend Christian, and of some other shows. Episodes in regional languages are also available. The approval of the webpage format by the MDR-Funkrat (Mittel-deutscher Rundfunk, the internal body in charge of creating television and radio programmes as well as web pages) led to disagreements within RTL, since the webpage represents a competition for the lucrative TOGGOLINO-CLUB by Super RTL.

Since 6 December 2017 a Kikaninchen app has been available for Android and iOS, and a Kikaninchen YouTube channel was launched in 2023.

== Awards ==
- Germany: Golden record in the category KIDS
  - 1× Platinum for the video album Komm mit in meine Welt! Die Kikaninchen-DVD 1 (2015)
  - 1× Gold for the video album Ich mache gern Quatsch – Die Kikaninchen DVD 2 (2016)
- Seal of approval for digital children's media Seitenstark in 2022 for the webpage kikaninchen.de, awarded by the Seitenstark association and the Federal Ministry of Family Affairs, Senior Citizens, Women and Youth.
