= LILALU =

LILALU is a non-profit educational and holiday program based in Munich, Germany, since 1997. Primarily conceived as an educational program only during the summer holidays, LILALU workshops are now taking place during all bavarian school holidays in Munich. The conception was also transferred to some other cities like Dortmund, Ingolstadt, Oldenburg and Schwetzingen.

== Activities ==
LILALU´s main aspects are full-day care workshops. Within children and teenagers aged between three and 16 years master creative and artistic accomplishments in domains as theater, dance, music, art, sport, artistic, circus and movement. Professional athletes and artists as well as skilled pedagogues make sure the participants do not only improve their practical skills but as well gain important social competencies. Ability to work in a team, self-awareness and others are encouraged playfully.

Attendance fees of 150 - 200 € are charged per workshop a week. In cooperation with Landeshauptstadt München LILALU additionally offers reduced-fee spots for families with low or middle income.

Since 2013 LILALU, in cooperation with Bundesamt für Migration und Flüchtlinge (Federal Government for Migration and Refugees), support youths with an immigrant background. By helping the workshop-manager and taking care of the participants the adolescents are able to gain first working experience, improve their language skills and earn some money.

In the context of full-day care, Lilalu also offers educational programs at local schools. During the summer time the program “Umsonst & Draußen” (costless and outside) entertains the whole family. With live-music at the beer garden, a flea market, trial-workshops and other activities, “Umsonst & Draußen” offers a huge variety of activities.

== Trusteeship ==
Till 2006 the social services department of city Munich had born the LILALU festival. After their retraction Lilalu e. V., a registered non-profit association, overtook the trusteeship. In 2012 the society had to declare its insolvency and had been taken over, among with ten permanent employees, by Johanniter-Unfall-Hilfe e. V. Anna Seliger, founder and project manager, and former chairman Willi Wermelt transferred to Johanniter-Unfall-Hilfe e. V. to become field manager of Lilalu.

== Supporters ==
Among others politicians Dieter Reiter, Martin Neumeyer and Winfried Kretschmann are patrons of Lilalu family program. Actors, like Suzanne von Borsody, Sissi Perlinger, Max von Thun and Heio von Stetten, and also TV moderator Ralph Caspers support Lilalu through a mentorship.
