= Winfried Debertin =

- Born: 24 January 1953 (age 72); Osnabrück, West Germany
- Occupations: Writer, producer

Winfried Debertin (born 24 January 1953 in Glandorf, Osnabrück, West Germany) is a freelance producer and director known for his contributions to Norddeutscher Rundfunk (NDR), and as the founder of a production company, Penta TV. He has worked as a director and producer since 1988. He received the 2006 ECHO Klassik Award in the Classical Music for Children category.

== Biography ==
Debertin began working with NDR after university, where he studied communications, social sciences and political science. At NDR he managed an editorial working group referred to as Preschool Television, where he focused on creating content similar to Sesame Street. He developed several television and movie concepts, including Hallo Spencer, Spencer Holiday Tips, and Rollercoaster. He is also a songwriter, and has written about 600 songs.

== Television career ==
Debertin developed the concept for the TV series Hallo Spencer in the late 1970s. He was inspired to create it when he learned of the growing demand for a German-language equivalent to the American children's series Sesame Street. In 1977, broadcasters were wary of the prevalence of American influence on German children's media, and felt that NDR should create a series similar to Sesame Street for German children's television. Filming of Hallo Spencer began in Studio Hamburg in 1978, featuring puppets and educational content designed to foster early childhood development. In later episodes, puppet-makers sought guidance from American artists; and the following year, Hallo Spencer debuted in Sesame Street's former time slot.

Until the late 1980s, Debertin and his partner Angelika Paetow co-led the show's production team. He became managing director of the film and television company PentaTV, where he created several more productions, including Leonie Lionheart, Tricky Toons, The Adventures of Max and Molly, The Supercool Südpoolgang and, most recently, Little Amadeus. Many of the Penta series were produced on behalf of NDR, SWR, HR, ARD / Ki.Ka and ORF.

== Success and reception ==
Debertin's success peaked during the production of Hallo Spencer in the late 1980s and early 1990s. In this period, merchandise was produced and marketed internationally. During this time, Debertin became independent and founded his own production company.

In the late 1990s, Hallo Spencer lost its traditional NDR broadcast date (Friday, 6 pm) and was taken off the KiKA program. Furthermore, the recent revival of the series has been poorly received. The most recent 38 episodes were produced in the years 1995–2001 by PentaTV productions. These episodes featured a limited number of the shows iconic characters and as a result, they are among the least popular episodes among the fan base. Regardless the episodes were released in 2007 on DVD.

More recently Debertin has found success with the animated series Little Amadeus, which was published in KiKA and reached high ratings. The series was broadcast in more than ten other countries, and its success led to the second season, which was released in 2007. Debertin's work was well received among critics, and he was awarded an ECHO Award.

== Controversy ==
In April 2011, NDR employees reported that Debertin had sold materials to which he no longer held the rights. The material consisted of cut-outs from old Hallo Spencer sequences to which NDR held the rights.

In 2010, it was revealed that PentaTV was insolvent. The firm held the first insolvency proceedings over its branch companies in 2009. Debertin was listed as the sole debtor and representative of PentaTV. In December 2015, Debertin announced in a public letter that he had "become insolvent due to third-party manipulation" and regretted that nothing had changed "despite phoning German courts.”
