= Wunderkind Little Amadeus =

- Also known as: Little Amadeus
- Genre: Historical
- Screenplay by: Udo Beissel; Winfried Debertin
- Opening theme: Little Amadeus by Heinz Rudolf Kunze; Kenny Norris (English Version)
- Country of origin: Germany
- Original languages: German; English
- No. of seasons: 1
- No. of episodes: 26

Production
- Producers: Peter Will; Winfried Debertin
- Running time: 24 minutes
- Production companies: LAR Little Amadeus Realisierungsgesellschaft mbH & Co. KG; KiKa; ARD

Original release
- Network: KiKa
- Release: 16 January – 30 November 2006
- Network: PBS
- Release: 7 September 2008 – 1 March 2009

Wunderkind Little Amadeus, commonly referred to as Little Amadeus and known in Germany as Die Abenteuer des jungen Mozart – "The Adventures of Young Mozart", is a German historical animated preschool television series produced by ARD and KiKa that debuted in January 2006. The show was licensed by American Public Television in 2008 for distribution to public television stations including PBS in the United States. It helps a young Wolfgang Amadeus Mozart feature a soundtrack with the musical works of the composer. The series originally aired on KiKa in Germany. During the PBS and American Public Television broadcasts the series had an American produced segment named "Monti's World" who Monti the Rat (Devilius' accomplice rat) would teach children about music theory, how a instrument is composed and history.

== Cast ==
Role	Original German voice	English voice
Wolfgang Amadeus Mozart	Joey Cordevin; Christine Pappert	Hilary Cahill
Bischof	Reinhard Kuhnert	
Devilius	Kai Hendrik Möller	Paul Glaser
Herr Hagenauer	Gerd Hinze	
Kajetan	Mark Robinson	
Leopold Mozart	Eberhard Haar	Leigh Hoch
Monti	Robert Missler	Robert Missler
Pumperl	Robert Missler	
Anna Maria Mozart	Marion von Stengel	Jacky Caesar
Frau Hagenauer	Marion Elskis	
Gräfin Kussmaul	Isabella Grothe	
Kati	Simona Pahl	
Mario	Ilona Schulz	
Nannerl Mozart	Saskia Weckler	Joey Cordevin
Treserl	Carla Becker	
Ursel	Sylvie Nogler	

== Episodes ==
No.	Title	U.S. air date
1	"Solo for Amadeus"	September 7, 2008
On the Bishop of Salzburg's name day, Amadeus will sing a brilliant solo for the festivities, but his malicious and envious rival, the lower court marshal Devilius, wants to stop him. Amadeus must help Mr. Hagenauer, the Bishop's court purveyor and the Mozart family's landlord, locate the missing coach carrying the delicious chocolates from Linz urgently needed for the festival. The chocolates finally reach Salzburg and the Hagenauers.
2	"The Stolen Watch"	September 14, 2008
Amadeus prepares a composition for the Golden Needle of Salzburg competition. The ambitious Devilius and conniving Monti the Rat want Devilius' nephew, Mario, to win the prize instead. With the help of a pocket watch and a stolen Mozart melody, they manage to make Amadeus look like a thief and plagiarist. In a spooky graveyard scene, Amadeus and his friend finally force a confession from Mario.
3	"Pumperl in Trouble"	September 21, 2008
Devilius and Monti the Rat scheme about a devious new plan. Together, they lure Pumperl, Amadeus' sweet little dog, into the hands of a dogcatcher. They hope he'll be too busy searching for Pumperl to perform at the silver wedding anniversary of his friend Kati's parents. This would enable Devilius' nephew Mario, who fell madly in love with Kati, to take Amadeus' place (and his music). Unfortunately for them, the bad guys didn't count on Pumperl's cleverness.
4	"Kidnappers"	September 28, 2008
Devilius hires two evil crooks to kidnap Amadeus and his best friend Kajetan so he can finally discover the secret behind Amadeus' music. The two boys, not easily taken by surprise, outwit the naive crooks and save themselves on a raft – until they encounter dangerous rapids.
5	"The Birdseller"	October 5, 2008
Amadeus wants to buy a new canary from the bird seller to cheer up his heartbroken sister, Nannerl. Meanwhile, Devilius thinks a magnificent golden eagle will turn him into a genius composer. He steals the eagle while staging an incident that results in all of the birds escaping. Authorities wrongly blame Amadeus and his friend for the incident and throw them into the dungeon of the Bishop's palace.
6	"Mixed Up Violin"	October 12, 2008
A bishop asks the Mozart family, now on a concert tour, to take a valuable violin to Munich as a present for the prince-elector. As always, Devilius wants to get the Mozarts into trouble, so he replaces the valuable violin with a worthless old fiddle. He hopes to make it look like the Mozarts sold the valuable violin in order to make money. Then, Devilius will simply hand over the real violin and receive generous praise.
7	"Rumors"	October 19, 2008
Devilius maliciously spreads the rumor that all of Amadeus' compositions were written by his father, Leopold Mozart. As a result, the Bishop organizes a competition in which Amadeus must compete against Devilius. An herbalist mixes a special ink for Devilius that makes Amadeus' composition disappear.
8	"The Bet"	October 26, 2008
The Bishop would like to give Countess Kussmaul, a patron and great lover of Mozart's music, one of Amadeus' compositions as a birthday gift. Devilius bets the Bishop that Amadeus cannot deliver a piece in such a short time. Confident of Mozart's talent as a composer, the Bishop wagers half of his royal household. In an attempt to win the wager, Devilius and Monti the Rat devise a villainous plan.
9	"Mysterious Drink"	November 2, 2008
The Bishop wants to hold a music competition between the cities of Linz and Salzburg. To prevent another brilliant success by Amadeus, Devilius obtains a strong sleeping potion, which should knock out Amadeus at the appropriate time. Devilius will then appear as the "black violinist" and claim victory for himself. To make matters worse, Amadeus' father, Leopold, took Amadeus' violin to a pawnbroker because he desperately needs money.
10	"The Wrong Boat"	November 9, 2008
On their way to Vienna, Amadeus and his sister Nannerl follow a troupe of actors and accidentally board the wrong ship. While their parents sail on the Danube towards Vienna, the two children enjoy their time aboard the pleasure boat. They cap off the performance of the acting troupe with their own musical accompaniment. Along the way, they help bring peace between an angry father and his daughter and future son-in-law.
11	"The Dancing Harbor"	November 16, 2008
After their boat trip on the Danube, the Mozarts land in Vienna, along with Devilius' deceitful trio. To prevent the Mozarts from entering Vienna, they steal Amadeus' father Leopold's wallet. This leads to big complications; customs officers mistake the Mozarts for merchants and ask them to pay high tariffs. Amadeus gets the whole harbor – including Empress Maria Theresia and her children – dancing with a sensational musical performance that convinces the customs officers. Now, nothing stands in the way of a visit to the imperial castle.
12	"Street Musicians"	November 23, 2008
On the way to their guesthouse in Vienna, the Mozarts witness a terrible incident in which the arrogant son of a nobleman mistreats an old woman and her grandchildren. Outraged, Amadeus challenges the man to a duel – "whip against violin." He deliberately plays the violin badly so that the horse of the evil young man runs away. News of this incident quickly spreads around Vienna. Amadeus gets to know two young street musicians and joins them to form a trio, playing in the music cafes of Vienna. However, neither the humiliated son of the nobleman nor Devilius and his sidekick Monti want to give up.
13	"Never Kiss an Empress"	November 30, 2008
The invitation to the imperial court still hasn't arrived. Money is short, and Devilius manipulates the innkeeper to demand the hotel bill from Amadeus' father, Leopold, in advance. Leopold has no other option but to return to Salzburg. Amadeus attempts to meet the Empress during a visit to the opera, without success. As the Mozarts make their way home in an oxcart, the invitation to the imperial court finally arrives! In a race against time, the misled innkeeper tries to reach the Mozarts to bring them back.
14	"The Bear Is Loose"	December 7, 2008
Amadeus and his dog, Pumperl, fetch some medicine for Amadeus' sister Nannerl. On the way, Pumperl follows another dog and disappears. While Amadeus searches for Pumperl, he stumbles on a performing bear at the marketplace. He receives gold coins (ducats) from the crowd for his violin playing. Devillius, green with envy, devises a plan to catapult his nephew Mario into Amadeus' place. But Mario's fiddling instead causes the bear to flee through the alleys of Vienna. Eventually, Amadeus' violin playing prevents even worse mishaps.
15	"The Broken Key"	December 14, 2008
Amadeus, tired of practicing on a "silent piano" in his hotel room, is thrilled to learn that a grand piano sits in the ballroom for a "Russian Evening." While he secretly plays the piano, one of the keys breaks. Devilius wants to impress the Russian nobility and manages to put the pianist, due to perform that night, out of action. In the meantime, Amadeus and Nannerl, with the help of Pumperl, try to earn some money on the street so they can buy a new key from the piano maker.
16	"Slippery When Wet"	December 21, 2008
The empress invites the Mozarts to the imperial court again. The children persuade two of the hotel employees to pose as their parents (who can't be reached) and accompany them to the court. This leads to problems when the real parents hear about the invitation and rush to the palace. In the meantime, Amadeus and Nannerl enjoy sliding on the polished floors of the palace with Marie Antoinette, the empress' youngest daughter.
17	"Small Pox"	December 28, 2008
Nannerl collapses during a concert at the palace, but no one knows why. When someone mentions smallpox, Devilius pretends to fall ill. Amadeus thinks the amulet Nannerl lost during the concert at the palace will help her regain her health and sneaks into the palace to look for it. Meanwhile, Devilius enjoys the attention he receives from his accomplices Mario and Monti.
18	"The Secret of Ybbs"	January 4, 2009
Princess Antoinette persuades Amadeus to uncover the secret of Ybbs, a nearby monastery. Amadeus convinces his parents to visit Ybbs on their way back home to Salzburg, where he immediately starts looking for the secret. Devilius and his gang get lost in a heavy snowfall and also end up at the monastery. They quietly creep around and cause confusion among the monks. The secret is finally revealed as a beautiful organ hidden behind a wall. Amadeus presents a small concert on the organ and Devilius, Monti and Mario flee from the monks in a mad rush – on the backs of two pigs!
19	"The Green Drops"	January 11, 2009
Devilius believes Amadeus' musical talent stems from the green miracle drops his mother gives him. Devilius wants to get his hands on this special mixture, so he can give it to Mario and turn him into a real opponent to the child prodigy.
20	"Shooting Stars"	January 18, 2009
The children want to sled next to the river on a snowy winter day in Salzburg. Pumperl hops onto a piece of floating ice and drifts away. A dramatic rescue operation ensues with help from Mario and a few unpopular boys from the neighborhood. They eventually locate Pumperl with a telescope, which the Bishop later intends to use to view hundreds of shooting stars. The weather doesn't cooperate, but Amadeus once again enchants the assembled company with his music.
21	"The Choir of the Silent Sisters"	January 25, 2009
The "Silent Sisters" cancel the Salzburg orphan boys choir performance at the annual harvest festival in the convent when a storm partially destroys the monastery. Amadeus and Nannerl plan to perform instead. Devilius, Mario and Monti turn up and put Amadeus out of action with a nasty trick so Mario can perform instead. In the end, Amadeus saves the convent from closure by forming a fantastic choir with the nuns, who break their vow of silence to sing along.
22	"Breakfast Music"	February 1, 2009
The cardinal, well known for his inspection trips that usually end with demotions and transfers, is on his way to visit the Bishop of Salzburg, who is extremely agitated by the impending visit. To make matters worse, the cardinal arrives a day early and nothing is ready. Even the Bishop's choirboys are unprepared to perform. The cardinal mercilessly inspects the palace, terrifying the fearful Bishop. But, thanks to Amadeus' ingenuity, the Bishop stays, and Devilius won't succeed him.
23	"Magic in Salzburg"	February 8, 2009
A great magician impresses Amadeus by making a poodle play the piano. Amadeus wonders if Pumperl is up to the task. Devilius figures out the trick and makes the poodle disappear. The magician asks for Amadeus' help when his second partner, a piano-playing dwarf, also disappears. With the aid of the young prodigy, the musician's performance at the Bishop's palace is a success – and Pumperl gives a piano concert after all!
24	"The Muted Trumpet"	February 15, 2009
Amadeus can't stand loud trumpet music and wants to prevent a joint concert maliciously arranged by Devilius with the famous trumpeter Schachtner. He and his friend Kajetan try to hide Schachtner's trumpet, but Devilius keeps finding other trumpets for Schachtner to play. Finally, Amadeus devises a solution for the joint concert with Schachtner, so he doesn't have to suffer the sounds of the trumpet.
25	"The Glockenspiel"	February 22, 2009
An international company of actors wants to perform in Salzburg – and Devilius wants to stop them. Amadeus knows the actors and prepares a musical number with them, using music he composed on the spur of the moment. Devilius takes drastic measures to prevent the performance. In the end, all of Salzburg cheers and Devilius plays an unexpected leading role on-stage.
26	"Into the World"	March 1, 2009
The Mozarts must give an evening concert at the Bishop's palace. Amadeus' father Leopold hopes this will convince the remaining skeptics to let them play music for the English court, with Joseph Haydn's invitation. The scheming Devilius deletes the planned concert from the Bishop's calendar but Amadeus finds a way to inform the Bishop about the Mozarts' travel plans.
