= Null gewinnt =

German Television Game show

Null gewinnt (literally, "Zero wins") is the German adaptation of the BBC game show Pointless. Hosted by Dieter Nuhr and Ralph Caspers, it aired on Das Erste from 20 July 2012 to 1 March 2013.

== Format ==
There are three pairs of contestants. Each question has previously been given to 100 members of the public, and the contestants seek to give the answer that the fewest of the public gave. The objective is to score as low as possible, and the duo with the highest score at the end of the round is eliminated. A press release gave the example that on a question about European capitals, it is better to say Podgorica than Berlin. In the final round, if the pair give a pointless answer – a correct one that nobody in the survey gave – they win the jackpot of €10,000.

== History ==
The show's first episode, at 6:50 pm on Friday 20 July 2012, received a 5.6% audience share (1.06 million viewers). In a time slot where the channel was already struggling, the show averaged 5-6% ratings while the channel's general average was 12.3%; in January it was announced that the show would cease in March.
