= Der Spatz vom Wallrafplatz =

- Created by: Armin Maiwald, Rudolf Fischer
- Country of origin: Germany
- No. of episodes: 36

Production
- Running time: 28 Minutes

Original release
- Network: Westdeutscher Rundfunk
- Release: 1969 – 1976

Der Spatz vom Wallrafplatz (engl.:The Sparrow of Wallraf Place) is a German television series which was aired by German public broadcaster Westdeutscher Rundfunk from 1969 to 1976. The show centers around the adventures of a sparrow which lives on a platanus tree on Wallraf Place in the heart of Cologne, close to the Westdeutscher Rundfunk building, Germany's biggest public broadcaster. While the scenes were shot at actual locations on Wallrafplatz and other places in Cologne, the sparrow was "played" by a Marionette and on one occasion, by a stick puppet.

== See also ==
- List of German television series
