= Mai Thi Nguyen-Kim =

German chemist, science communicator, television presenter and YouTuber

Mai Thi Leiendecker
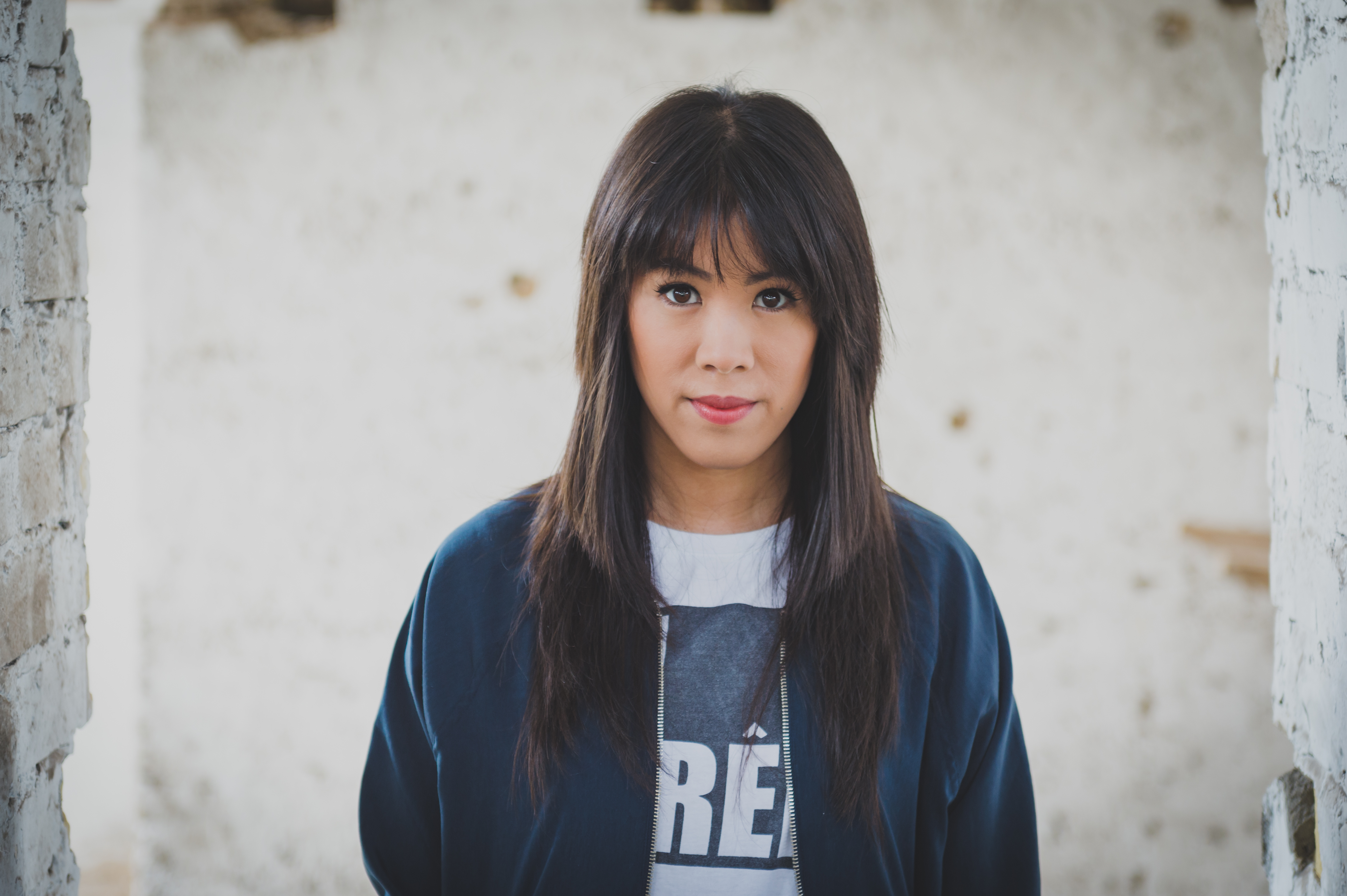
- Nguyen-Kim in 2017
- Born: 7 August 1987 (age 39); Heppenheim, Hesse, West Germany
- Education: University of Mainz; Massachusetts Institute of Technology
- Occupations: Chemist, science communicator, television presenter and YouTuber
- Spouse: Matthias Leiendecker
- Children: 2
- Awards: See Awards

YouTube information
- Channel: MAITHINK X
- Years active: 2016–present
- Genre: Science
- Subscribers: 1.53 million
- Views: 168.5 million
- Last updated: 28 July 2026

Mai Thi Nguyen-Kim (born 7 August 1987) is a German chemist, science communicator, television presenter and YouTuber. In June 2020 she was elected to the senate of the Max Planck Society.

== Life and education ==
Nguyen-Kim was born in 1987 in Heppenheim, Hesse; her parents are from South Vietnam, her father is also a chemist. She completed the Abitur in 2006 in Hemsbach. She studied at the Johannes Gutenberg University Mainz and Massachusetts Institute of Technology. She worked on her doctorate at RWTH Aachen University, Harvard University, and the University of Potsdam; completing it in 2017. She rejected a job offer from BASF to focus on science communication. She is married and has a daughter born in January 2020. A second child was born in 2023.

== Career ==
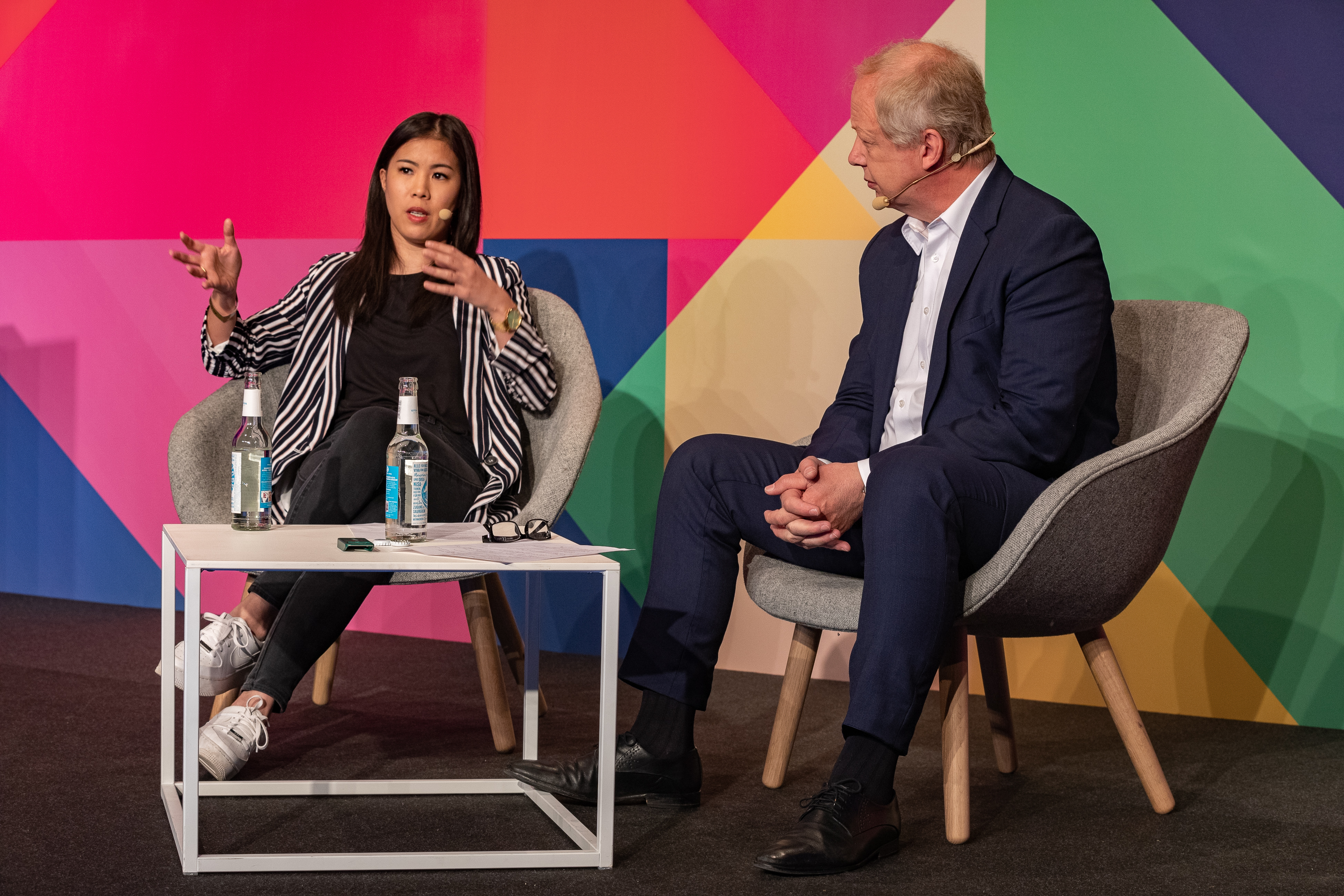
Nguyen-Kim and Tom Buhrow at Media Convention Berlin 2019

Nguyen-Kim started the YouTube channel The Secret Life Of Scientists in 2015. In 2016, she began another channel, maiLab (originally named schönschlau), which is funded by German public broadcasters ARD and ZDF and as of September 2020 has over 1 million subscribers.

She published popular videos about the COVID-19 pandemic on maiLab which made it into German YouTube trends and reached several million viewers within a short time.

She also contributed a widely noticed commentary on this topic in the German news programme Tagesthemen (ARD) and was invited as an expert in various talk shows.

On German television, Nguyen-Kim presents the science show Quarks (WDR Fernsehen) since 2018, alongside Ralph Caspers. With Harald Lesch and Philip Häusser she presents the online video series Terra X Lesch & Co.

Since October 2021, she presents a TV show called MAITHINK X – Die Show on ZDFneo.

Her book Chemistry for Breakfast (German: Komisch, alles chemisch, transl. Weird, all chemical), published in March 2019, has been on the Spiegel bestseller list since November 2019.

== Awards ==
- Grimme Online Award (2018)
- Georg von Holtzbrinck Prize for Science Journalism (2018)
- German Web Video Award (2018)
- Medium Magazin Journalist of the Year (2018)
- Hanns Joachim Friedrichs Award (2019)
- Federal Cross of Merit (2020)
- Heinz Oberhummer Award for Science Communication (2020)
- Grimme-Preis (2021) for journalistic contributions on COVID-19

== Publications ==
- Nguyen-Kim, Mai Thi (2019). Komisch, alles chemisch! (in German). Droemer Verlag. ISBN 978-3-426-27767-6.
- Nguyen-Kim, Mai Thi (2021). Chemistry for breakfast: The amazing science of everyday life. Greystone Books. ISBN 978-1-77164-748-9. - See entry at German National Library
