= Armin Maiwald =

German television producer

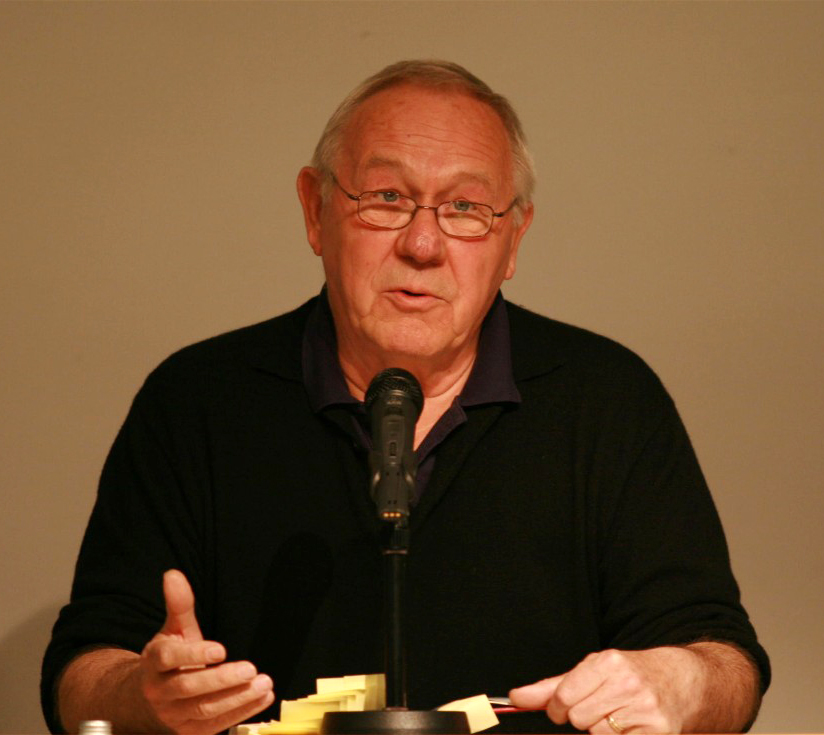
- Maiwald giving a lecture at a school in 2008
- Born: 23 January 1940 (age 86); Cologne, Germany
- Occupations: Television director, producer

Armin Maiwald (born 23 January 1940) is a German author, television director and producer. Maiwald is one of the founders of the award-winning German children's television program, Die Sendung mit der Maus. Often just called Die Maus ("The Mouse"), the program has been on the air since March 1971 and is one of the most successful children's television programs ever produced. Maiwald has won over 50 awards for his work.

== Professional career ==
In 1963, he began working as an assistant director at the West German television station, WDR, and in 1971, he became one of the founders of Die Sendung mit der Maus (The Program with the Mouse), which has been called "the school of the nation" and one of the most successful children's programs ever produced.

From decades of narrating the program's educational film shorts (Sachgeschichten), Maiwald's voice is widely recognized even when he merely orders a cup of coffee or a beer. He was first seen onscreen in the late 1970s. Today, he is an integral part of the broadcast, along with fellow presenters, e.g. Christoph Biemann.

Maiwald was previously the director of other children's programs, Der Spatz vom Wallrafplatz and Robbi, Tobbi und das Fliewatüüt as well as the first episodes of the puppet series, Hallo Spencer. He has also created the Bibliothek der Sachgeschichten (library of educational film shorts) from his productions for "The Mouse". Maiwald produces some 20 film shorts a year for the program.

A number of "The Mouse" educational shorts are used at universities, and other institutions as educational tools and Maiwald has received numerous media and journalism awards for his work. In 1988, he received the Adolf Grimme Award. In 1995, he was awarded the prestigious Order of Merit of the Federal Republic of Germany. In addition, there is a special education school in Radevormwald named after him. In October 2010, it was announced that an elementary school in Monheim am Rhein would also be named after him.

An outspoken critic of the decline of television programming, including at the station that broadcasts his own program, Maiwald has complained about the quality of programs available for children and the bottom-line mentality that rules decision-making in scheduling and content.

== Postwar years explained to children ==
In 1989, Maiwald produced the Nachkriegs-Maus ("Postwar Mouse"), a short film in two parts. This award-winning special was produced after Maiwald found himself in Uffing, where he was evacuated after World War II and was flooded with memories of his experiences as a child after the war. Maiwald wanted to tell his then 6-year-old daughter and his young viewers what it was like to be a child in Germany in the aftermath of the war. They found black-and-white photos from the past and located the sites, shooting them in color as they looked years later. For the series, they super-imposed the black-and-white images of ruins over the contemporary images, so the children could see how Germany looked after the war and compare it to their own era.

Using a mix of postwar-era footage and still photographs, he shows the devastated cities, the millions who lost their lives, the return of concentration camp survivors and the desperate circumstances of average Germans, many of whom had lost everything. Maiwald described in depth how the children had to live. He showed how they dressed in whatever they were able to scrounge and how many lived in the bombed out buildings, how others, like himself, lived in apartments with several other families. He also told of the rampant hunger and showed graphically the amount of food he was rationed per day.

Maiwald said the Postwar Mouse was the hardest film he ever produced and that when he had finished it, he never wanted to see it again.

== Personal life ==
Maiwald experienced the Second World War as a small child. Before he was three, he had been bombed out of three homes in Cologne and fled with his mother and infant sister to Silesia. They stayed there from 1942 to 1945, when the Russians came, then fled to Dresden and were there when it was bombed, shortly after Maiwald's fifth birthday. He escaped on the last train out and says he will never forget looking out the window at the conflagration that Dresden had become. By the age of five, he had seen more burning buildings and dead bodies than most Germans see in their entire lives, Maiwald says.

After that, they went to Munich, till the city was evacuated. Then they went to Weilheim in Oberbayern and from there, were evacuated to Uffing, where the family lived until 1951. Although they finally had a roof over their heads, it was not an easy life because the owners of the house were forced to empty rooms to take in refugees, different families in different rooms. At school, the local children occasionally picked fights with the refugee children. At one point, his mother was nearly shot—with Maiwald and his sister standing right there—when American soldiers found her with a photo of her husband, in Nazi uniform. Maiwald says his mother survived because the soldiers were called away in that moment. Maiwald's father was killed in the war but was first reported as missing in action. It was years before it was learned that he had been killed by a bomb in 1945.

In the aftermath of the war, life was a daily struggle for survival, of finding food, shelter, clothing, water and fuel. Many schools were destroyed, so it was not uncommon for children to have to travel very far to go to school and when they got there, there were no books and no paper. Books were banned because of denazification, so the teacher wrote everything on a board in front of the room and the children used erasable tablets to copy everything down.

To this day, he always goes to bed with a set of clothing within reach, because it was so ingrained in him as a child, the necessity of being prepared to leave home at a moment's notice. He also cannot bring himself to throw food away. Maiwald was 13 when he, his mother and sister moved back to Cologne and "normal life". For a child who had only known rubble, scavenging, evacuations and life as a refugee, it was "unbelievable luxury". For Maiwald and other German children born during the 1940s, "normal life" was forced evacuations hundreds of kilometers from home, makeshift clothing and furniture, and food from CARE Packages.

Maiwald had to start working at the age of 14, nonetheless, he finished school and was able to go to university. At university, he majored in Theaterwissenschaften (theater studies), German studies and philosophy. However, he did not get a degree because at the time, there was no master's or bachelor's degree, only a doctorate. He was in the middle of his research when he realized that he didn't want to become a theoretician, but rather wanted to be doing things, so he quit and went to work.

Maiwald was a chain smoker for years and quit after a lung infection. Appearing on WDR's program, Streitfall, during which the discussion was on European Union laws to protect non-smokers, he stated that it was better to smoke than to be fat. His arguments were seen as shocking and unseemly for someone "in his position", held as a hero by many children. Even the fact that he was once a chain smoker was hard to believe.

Maiwald is married and has two grown children. He lives in Cologne.

== Awards ==
Maiwald has received over 50 awards, including the following:

- 1985 – Ernst Schneider Award
- 1988 – Adolf Grimme Award
- 1995 – Order of Merit of the Federal Republic of Germany
- 1995 – Bayerischer Fernsehpreis, awarded for the special "Postwar Mouse"
- 2002 – Ernst Schneider Award
- 2005 - Georg von Holtzbrinck Prize for Science Journalism

== Audio recordings ==
- Armin Maiwald liest Christoph Columbus und das Wachsen der Welt. Ungekürzte Lesung; ab 9 Jahren. Es lesen Armin Maiwald und Dieter Saldecki. Arena-Verlag, Würzburg. (2006) ISBN 978-3-401-25929-1 (in German)
- Geschichten aus dem Alten Ägypten mit der Maus. Script by Dieter Saldecki and Peter Brandt. Read by Dieter Saldecki and Armin Maiwald. Universal Family Entertainment, Hamburg. (2002) ISBN 3-89832-935-6 (in German)

== Books ==
- Peter Brandt, Armin Maiwald, Dieter Saldecki, Jesus – Jeschua – Iesous. Arena, Würzburg (2007) ISBN 978-3-401-05948-8 (in German)
