= Chemistry for Breakfast =

2019 book by Mai Thi Nguyen-Kim

Chemistry for Breakfast: The Amazing Science of Everyday Life (German: Komisch, alles chemisch! Handys, Kaffee, Emotionen – wie man mit Chemie wirklich alles erklären kann) is a non-fiction book by Mai Thi Nguyen-Kim, published in 2019 by Droemer Verlag. Claire Lenkova did the illustration work.

The English version, translated by Sarah Pybus, was published by Greystone Books in 2021.

Nguyen-Kim stated that she wanted to show that chemistry can be interesting. Wade-Lee Smith of the University of Toledo library described the style as using "analogies and simple illustrations" to make chemistry comprehensible to the lay public, and that the tone is "casual and familiar".

An editor of Science Magazine, Marc S. Lavine, wrote that the book's goal is establishing critical thinking instead of encouraging readers to pursue a career in science.

== Contents ==
The author describes actions in daily life by explaining the implications chemistry has for them. She shows that everything that surrounds us, including ourselves, is chemistry. She uses everyday phenomena and objects to explain the basic principles of chemistry in a light, conversational tone.

Based on the daily routine, Nguyen-Kim addresses various aspects that lead through the whole world of organic, inorganic and physical chemistry: When waking up in the morning, melatonin and cortisone levels are crucial, she explains, when the first coffee works best (one hour after getting up) and why fluoride in toothpaste is important. Why sweat stinks is explained, as well as why we smell it - even if the realization is rather unpleasant. It explains why the hydrophilic protective layer of the skin is attacked by the surfactants during daily showering and what exactly happens in the process. When preparing a chocolate fondant, it becomes clear how food reacts chemically when heated and what we really taste on the tongue. The day ends with a convivial glass of wine, which is of course also chemistry at work in the body.

The book also provides insights into the scientific world and the life of doctoral students and post-docs, which is characterized by long working hours with a high workload and having to cope with strict hierarchies. Nguyen-Kim also writes about her family, her friends and their heartache.

She argues that promotions like "all natural" are used to fool consumers into believing such products are automatically better for them.

== Reception ==
Keogh described it as "impassioned, quirky, fun, and engaging".

Lavine stated that the book appeals to readers through the storytelling and the "irreverence" in the narrative.

Smith recommended the book for people without a background in science. Smith argued that he was not sure whether some of the characters in the stories actually existed, and that the stories "feel contrived".

Wolfgang Schneider of the Frankfurter Allgemeine wrote that "Immer wieder findet Mai Thi Nguyen-Kim Vergleiche und Formulierungen, die komplizierte Sachverhalte anschaulich machen," (that the book used simple illustrations to clarify scientific concepts).

Reviewer Melissa Wuske of Foreword Magazine gave a starred review and praised the translation and the "impeccable and personable" writing, describing the book as "engaging, accessible, and downright fun".

Volkart Wildermuth reviewed the title at Deutschlandfunk Kultur: The author tells of her personal life in a lively and open-minded way, revealing chemical connections. In doing so, she always follows the credo: one must not be satisfied with simple answers. This not only explains chemistry, but also sets out scientific principles.

Katja Maria Engel writes on 24 May 2019 at Spektrum.de that the author provides an "original, technically competent, well-researched introduction to chemistry, always with references", while remaining entertaining and also wanting to arouse scepticism towards unsubstantiated studies.
