= Christoph Biemann =

German writer, director and producer (born 1952)

Christoph Biemann (born 6 August 1952) is a German writer, director and producer and one of the presenters of the award-winning children's television show, Die Sendung mit der Maus. Also known as Die Maus ("The Mouse"), it has been on the air since 1971; Biemann joined the show in 1972. He has his own production company, Delta TV, and has won numerous awards, including the Order of Merit of the Federal Republic of Germany. Though he produces many film shorts for The Mouse, he doesn't speak in or narrate any of them. He is known by a trademark green sweatshirt, which he wears on television and in public appearances.

== Biographical highlights ==
Biemann was born 6 August 1952 in Ludwigslust in Mecklenburg. He was a foreign exchange student at an American high school from 1969 to 1970 and also audited classes at Harvard University. In 1972, while attending college at the Hochschule für Fernsehen und Film (College of Television and Film) in Munich, he started an internship at the television station Westdeutscher Rundfunk (WDR), afterwards continuing as a freelance director. He began to work at The Mouse that same year.

From 1978 to 1988, he was employed by The Mouse and worked with Armin Maiwald's film production company, Flash-Film directing film shorts for The Mouse. He founded his own production company, Delta TV, in 1989 and produces 65 film shorts a year for The Mouse. Initially, he was only a director for The Mouse, but began to appear on camera in 1983.

Biemann has received numerous awards for his work, including the Order of Merit of the Federal Republic of Germany in 1995.

== Christoph, the persona ==
In contrast to Armin Maiwald and Ralph Caspers, the other two presenters of The Mouse, Biemann's on-camera persona is a bit comical and clumsy. Though middle-aged, he relates to the young viewers on their level, as a kind of child himself and not knowing things. His character lets children say, "Look! He doesn't know everything either!" Children see him as a big brother and approachable. The idea of bringing a comic element to the show came from his daughter, then a little girl, who complained to her father that the educational segments were "frightfully boring". Biemann took the criticism to heart and determined to bring some levity to his productions. He never narrates his own film shorts, rather they are narrated by an off-camera voice, as though Biemann is the child and the off-camera voice is the adult. Older film shorts have Maiwald or Elke Heidenreich as narrator, but newer ones alternate with another female, Evi Seibert.

While making the educational film short known as Atom Mouse, the filming took a while. Biemann selected a particular sweatshirt, a green one, to wear because he had two of them and therefore wouldn't have to worry about continuity, but could simply wear the second shirt if the first was dirty. Afterwards, the green sweatshirt became his trademark and now, he is never seen without it, either on camera or in his public appearances. He has since worn out "a good 15 sweatshirts" and keeps about 10 of them, having them specially dyed for him.

== Books ==
- Christoph Biemann, Christophs Experimente. Hanser, München (2003) Book of scientific experiments for children. ISBN 3-446-20339-7 (in German)
