= Shary Reeves =

German footballer (born 1969)

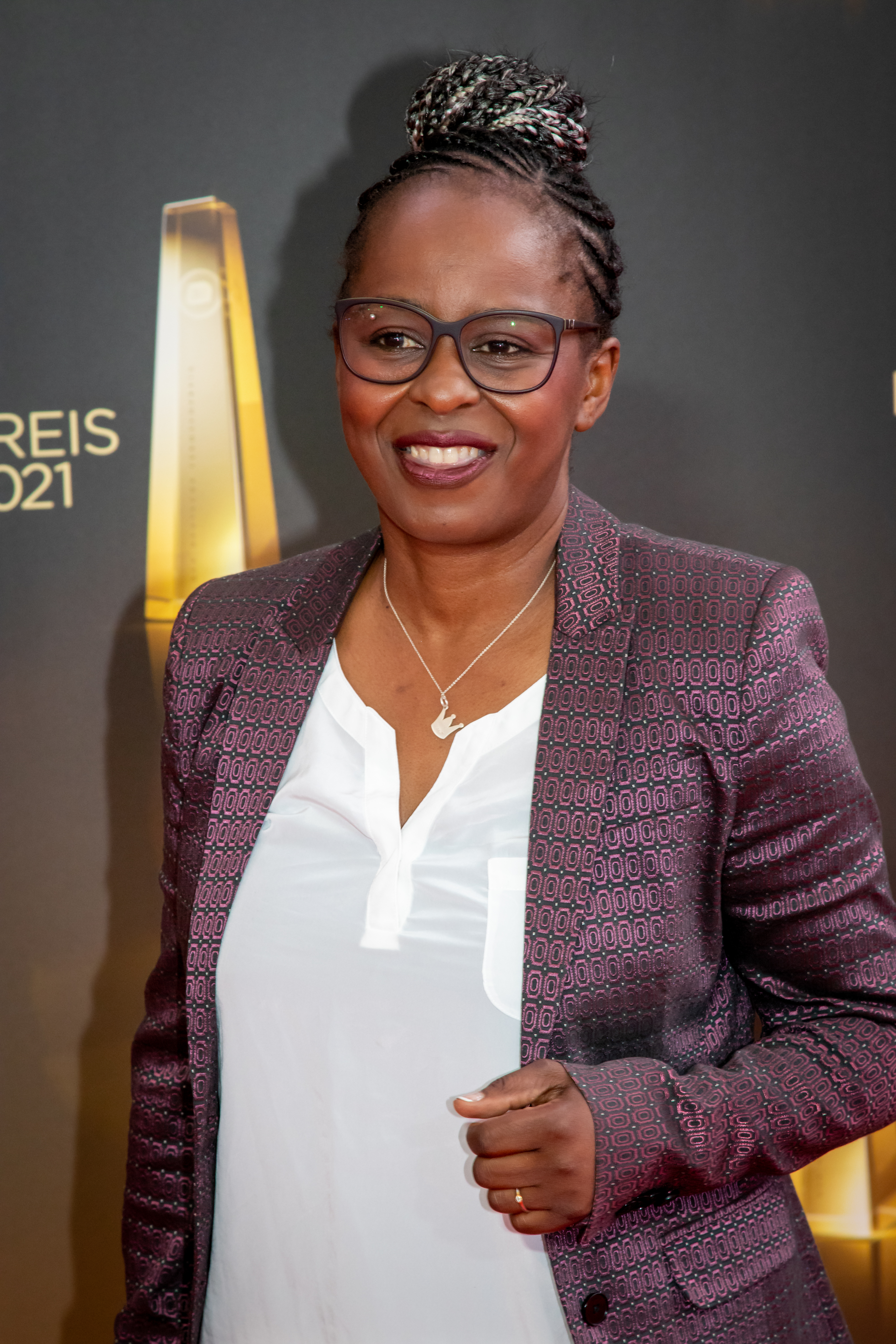
- Shary Reeves in 2021

Personal information
- Full name: Shary Cheyenne Reeves
- Date of birth: 10 May 1969 (age 57)
- Place of birth: Cologne, West Germany

Shary Cheyenne Reeves (born 10 May 1969) is a German actress, television presenter and former professional football player.

== Football career ==
Reeves played for two years at SC 07 Bad Neuenahr before transferring to 1. FFC Frankfurt. She later returned to SC 07 Bad Neuenahr.

== Post-football career ==
After retiring, Reeves presented the popular children's show Wissen macht Ah!, which she hosted until 2017 alongside Ralph Caspers.

== Personal life ==
In December 2021, Reeves married Linda Wnendt who she met at University of Bonn.

== Honours and awards ==
- 2016: Medal of Merit of the Order of Merit of the Federal Republic of Germany
- 2021 Bavarian TV Awards for the entertainment category for Brennpunkt Racism
