= Clarissa Corrêa da Silva =

German television presenter

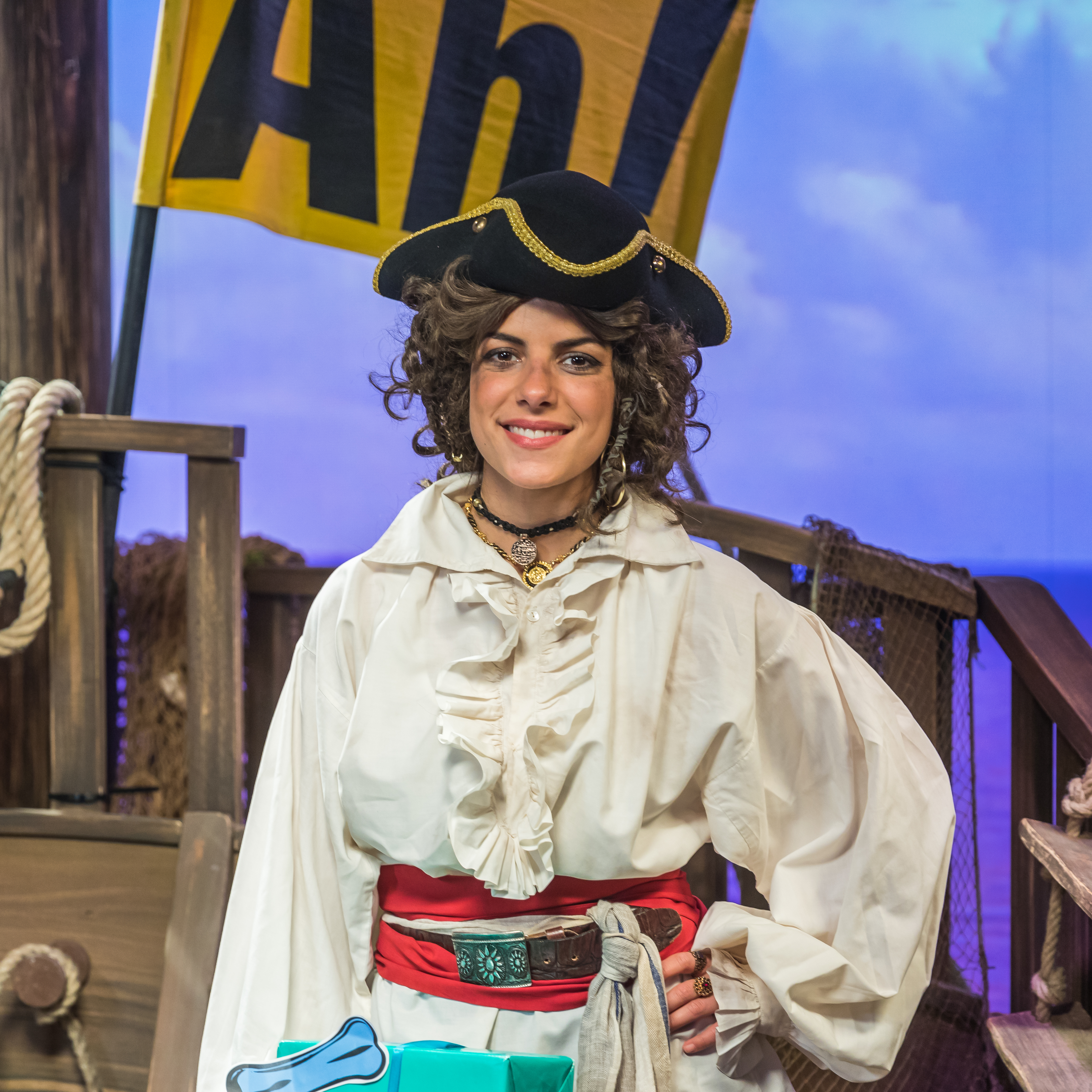
- Clarissa Corrêa da Silva dressed as a pirate in an episode of the show Wissen macht Ah! in 2009
- Born: June 17, 1990 (age 35)
- Occupation: Television presenter

Clarissa Corrêa da Silva (born 17 June 1990) is a German television presenter of the television show Wissen macht Ah!.

In November 2016, Corrêa da Silva began her television presenting career with the TV show Kummerkasten on KiKA. She hosted the WDR television show Wissen macht Ah! since January 2018.
