= Hallo Spencer =

- Created by: Winfried Debertin
- Starring: Joachim Hall; Wilhelm Helmrich et al.
- Country of origin: Germany
- Original language: German
- No. of episodes: 275

Production
- Running time: 29 minutes per episode (German version), 22 minutes (US version)

Original release
- Network: NDR
- Release: December 27, 1979 – 2001

Hallo Spencer is a German children's television series, created by Winfried Debertin and produced by Norddeutscher Rundfunk (NDR) from 1979 until 2001. In these 22 years, 275 episodes were filmed, including a number of 'specials' featuring the characters taking part in traditional fairy tale and nursery rhyme-themed stories.

It is a puppet based show, featuring characters created and operated in the same fashion as Jim Henson's Muppets and Sesame Street, and, in fact, some of the show's staff were former employees of Sesamstraße, the German version of Sesame Street. To this day, the series is popular and well loved in its home country to the extent that the theme park Heide Park featured a themed area devoted to the show until it was removed in 2017. In 2023, it was reported that the animatronics that came from the area were stolen and vandalized between 2021 and 2022.

The series has been repeated on the commercial channels Nickelodeon Germany and on the pay-TV channel Premiere. Episodes were regularly found on regional broadcast stations until March 2011.

The series has three spinoffs: The Adventures of Max and Molly, Poldi and the Dragons and Spencer Kids.

A film produced for ZDF Hallo Spencer - Der Film features German television presenter Jan Böhmermann. The film premiered at Filmfest München in July 2024. The film was released on ZDF's streaming service ZDF-Mediathek on December 13, 2024.

== Plot ==
Hallo Spencer is set in the fictional German town of Spencerdorf. Geographically, the area is wildly varied: densely forested and lush grassland areas border an arid, extremely localised volcanic area. The US language version was relocated to Spencerville, Ohio, which is a real town. Spencer usually greets the viewers and introduces a special theme for the plot of the episode, e.g. basic things like beds or greetings. The story then shifts around the village with the characters contributing something related to the theme.

Later episodes switched from the village to Spencer's apartment, where he would normally tell a story to the viewer.

== Main characters ==
US character names from the Saban Productions series are listed alongside their original German counterparts.

=== Spencer (Hallo/Hello Spencer) ===
The protagonist. In the early episodes, Spencer lived in a television studio, although he later moved into an apartment in the Hallerstraße. He is the mayor of the village, and has at his disposal a videophone with which he can watch and speak to any of the residents at any time. Spencer's first name in the US broadcasts, Hallo, simply means "hello" in German, so the show's original German title Hallo, Spencer is Hello, Spencer in English. There is a sign hanging on the back wall of Spencer's studio displaying the German title and US distributors thought it would be necessary to have an English explanation to that – thus Hallo or Hello in English became Spencer's first name in the US.

- Puppeteers: Joachim Hall, Jürgen Meuter (hands).

=== Elvis (Elmar) ===
Elvis is Spencer's assistant. He lives with his girlfriend Lulu in a railway carriage known as the Dream Express.
Puppeteer: Wilhelm Helmrich, Matthias Hirth.
US voice artist: Robert Axelrod.

=== Lulu ===
Lulu lives with Elvis in the Dream Express. In early episodes, she had no nose.
Puppeteer: Maria Ilic.
US voice artist: Barbara Goodson.

=== Peggy ===
Peggy is Lulu's sister. She only appears in the first 5 episodes.

=== Nepomuk (Grumpowski Nepomuk) ===
Nepomuk is an irritable and stubborn creature. His nickname is Nepi (Grumpo in the American version). He dislikes the nickname Nepi, only allowing his friend Kasi to use it. He lives in a large castle.
Puppeteer: Horst Lateika.
US voice artist: Mike Reynolds.

=== Kasimir ===
Kasimir (or Kasi for short) is a red creature with unusually long arms, who lives in a chestnut tree that has an elevator built inside it. He is Nepomuk's best friend and the only villager allowed to call him Nepi (although this is not the case in early episodes). Kasi is very helpful, and does many different jobs in the village.
Puppeteers: Herbert Langemann, Martin Leßmann.
US voice artist: Dave Mallow

=== Poldi ===
Poldi (the German familiar form of Leopold) is a dragon who lives in a volcanic crater. If irritated by other characters, he will often threaten to eat them (though he never does).
Puppeteer: Friedrich Wollweber.
US voice artist: Michael McConnohie.

=== Pummelzacken ===
Pummelzacken is a female dragon. She is Poldi's girlfriend.

=== Lexi ===
Lexi is the bookworm of the village. He lives in a mushroom and is continually compiling his enormous library, known as the Lexiklopädie (Lexipedia in the American version). He is attracted to Lisa and was in a relationship with her for most of the series.
Puppeteers: Lorenz Claussen, Matthias Hirth, Joachim Hall.
US voice artist: Ted Lehmann.

=== The Quietschbeus (The Screech Boys) ===
The Quietschbeus are a trio of musicians who live in the television studio alongside Spencer. In every episode they perform a song related to the topic of the episode. Their German name is derived from the 'Beach Boys'.

- Karl-Heinz (Frankie) is the band-leader, and has a green nose. In the original version, he has a distinct dialect. Puppeteers: Petra Zieser, Eva Behrmann, Karime Vakilzadeh
  US voice artist: Bill Capizzi
- Karl-Gustav has a red nose. He often has problems making decisions. Puppeteers: Klaus Naeve, Lorenz Claussen.
- Karl-Otto has a blue nose. In the original, he stutters. Puppeteers: Matthias Hirth, Lothar Kreutzer, Jürgen Meuter.

=== Mona and Lisa ===
Twin girls who live on a houseboat and are usually found arguing. Mona and Lisa are not identical twins. They can be identified by their different hairstyles. Mona has her hair tied in two pigtails, while Lisa has a single ponytail. Lisa was in a relationship with Lexi for most of the series.
The twins first appeared in Episode 6.
Puppeteers: Petra Zieser, Sabine Steincke, Karime Vakilzadeh, Andrea Bongers (Mona), Eva Behrmann (Lisa).
US voice artist: Lara Cody

=== Galaktika (Galactica) ===
Galaktika is an alien from Andromeda. The villagers can summon her by singing. However, in some early episodes, Galaktika appears without the need for a song.
Puppeteer: Maria Ilic.
US voice artist: Barbara Goodson

=== Nero ===
Nero is a demon. He appeared only in several early episodes to cause trouble for Spencer and the others, being quickly dropped from the show when it became clear that young viewers were afraid of him.
Puppeteers: Friedrich Wollweber, Matthias Hirth, Joachim Hall.

== International Dubs ==
In the early 1990s, after many years of success in its homeland and in other countries that broadcast dubbed versions of the original series including Mexico, Saban International bought the foreign rights to Hallo Spencer. The show was soon translated and released in many countries around the world, including Poland, United States, Canada, the United Kingdom, China, Israel, Spain, Singapore, Russia, most countries in Scandinavia and the Netherlands. However, the rushed translations and changes made to the show were for the worse. The European style of characters speaking over one another made scenes unintelligible and laughable in other regions. This was not helped by the program's comparatively low budget.

In December 1992, it was reported that Saban Entertainment had acquired 52 episodes of Hallo Spencer for $370,000 per episode totaling $19.4 million. The series was retitled The Hallo Spencer Show with a planned broadcast during the 1993–94 television season. The North American version was heavily edited by translating and rewriting scripts, cutting seven minutes from each episode in order to fit the American broadcast schedule during its first-run syndication on local networks around 3:00 PM EST/2:00 PM Central Time Zone, and to accommodate the inclusion of a rap at the end, summarizing the events of the episode. The scenes were also rearranged which resulted in continuity errors. The title character, Spencer, was renamed Hello Spencer (Hello an English version of the name instead of the original German Version) now being his first name, due to the impossibility of removing the "Hallo (German for Hello) Spencer" sign usually seen behind him in his office), and many other characters were altered to make them more palatable. Nepomuk also found himself with a first name: Grumpowski, Elvis became Elmar and the house band, the Quietschbeus became The Screech Boys. The series aired from 1992 to 1993. In the late 2000s, an alternative and more faithful English dub was produced by Hallo Spencer's production company, PentaTV. The PentaTV English dub was included as a bonus feature in the German DVDs.

== Episode availability ==
Episodes of the original version are widely available in Germany on VHS and DVD.

The English language version is very rare online, unsurprisingly. 52 episodes were originally translated and broadcast, but only six have been released on VHS in three volumes in the United Kingdom. Judging by the contents of the tapes, the American episodes seem to have been chosen at random, with no regard at all to the running order of the original series.
The contents of each tape is as follows:

- Volume 1:

A Friend from China (Episode 100) and The Storm (Episode 86)

- Volume 2:

The Visitor (Episode 121) and The Argument (Episode 77)

- Volume 3:

The Less I See, The More I Hear (Episode 84) and A Million for Mona Lisa (Episode 120)

Another VHS tape was released in the United States in 1993.
