= Die Sendung mit der Maus =

German children's television series

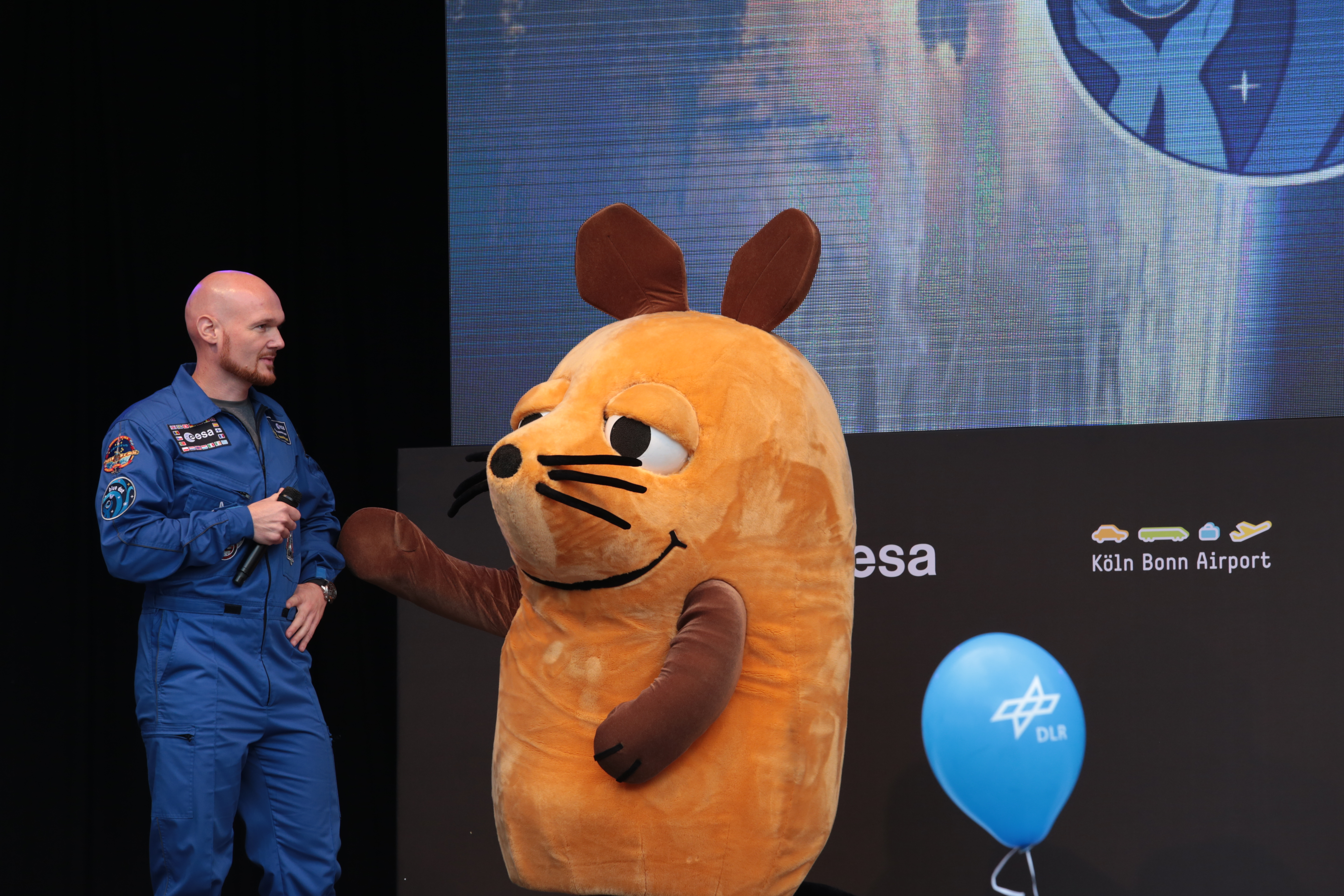
- Genre: Children's television
- Created by: Dieter Saldecki; Gert Kaspar Müntefering; Armin Maiwald
- Presented by: Armin Maiwald; Christoph Biemann; Ralph Caspers
- Theme music composer: Hans Posegga
- Countries of origin: West Germany (1971-1990); Germany (1990-present)
- Original language: German
- No. of episodes: 2122+ (July 2018)

Production
- Running time: 30 min.
- Production companies: WDR, RBB, SR, SWR

Original release
- Network: Das Erste
- Release: 7 March 1971 – present

Die Sendung mit der Maus (The Show with the Mouse), often Die Maus (The Mouse), is a German children's television series. The show first aired on 7 March 1971.

Originally called Lach- und Sachgeschichten für Fernsehanfänger, it was controversial because West German law prohibited television for children under six years of age. Today, the show is beloved and easily recognized among Germans for its theme, its mascots and the introduction as "Lach- und Sachgeschichten" (Funny and Documentary Stories).

The program was initially condemned by teachers and childcare professionals as bad for children's development, but is now hailed for its ability to convey information to children, having received over 75 awards. On 7 March 1999 the program's Internet site was launched and received 2,400 e-mails and 4 million hits on the first day.

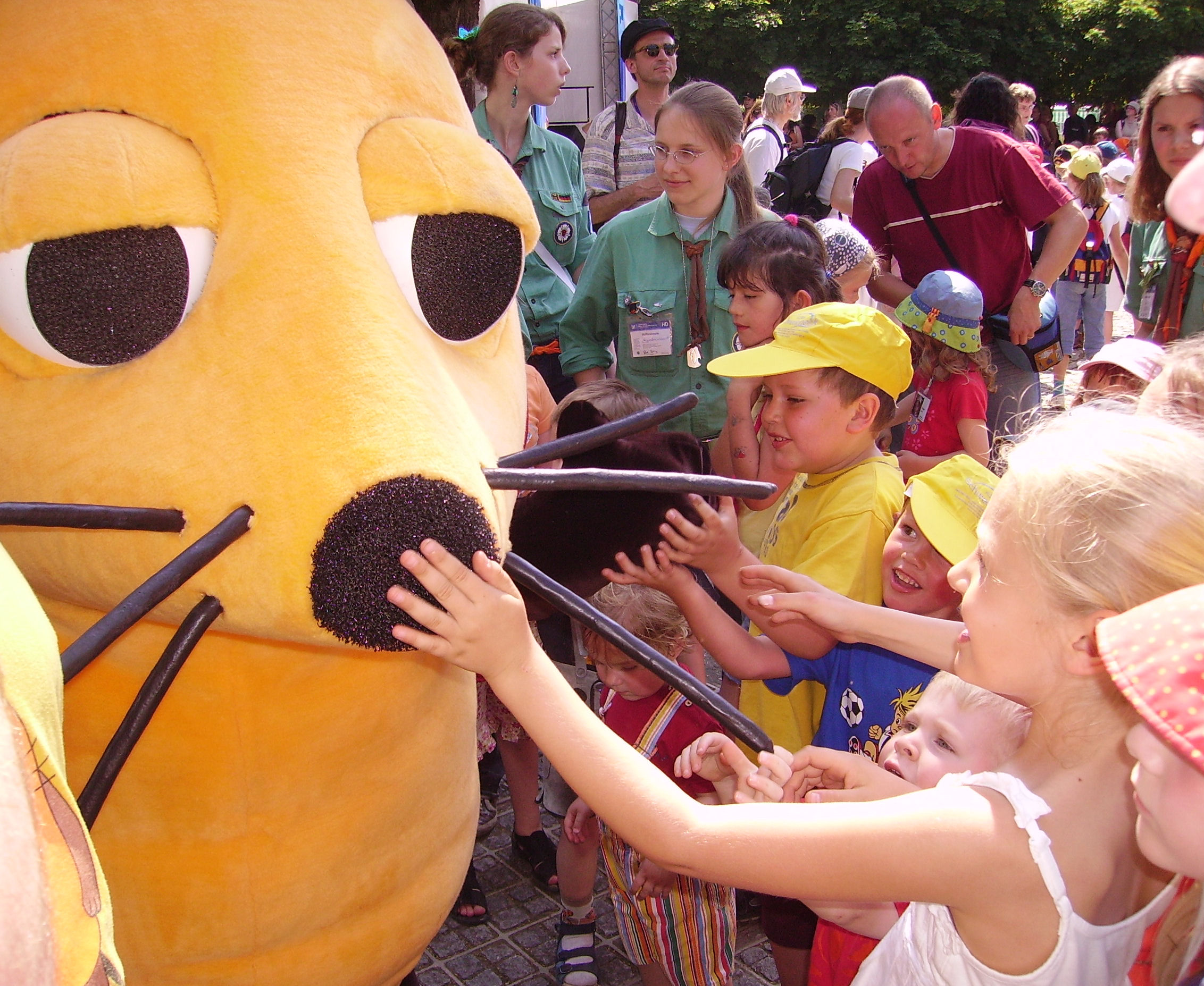
The Mouse at a show called The Festival of Germany, with German girlscouts in the background

== Format ==
Aimed at young children, the program has a magazine format, with several segments, some humorous, others educational presented in a simple, straightforward manner. Many of the show's early viewers are now adults whose children are forming the second generation of viewers. It is not uncommon for children to watch the program with their parents or for children to stop watching around the age of 10 or 12 and then come back at the age of 18. The German newspaper Welt am Sonntag found that although the target age was from about four to eight, the average age of viewers was 39.

Each show consists of several segments, the Lachgeschichten ("laughing stories") purely to amuse, and the Sachgeschichten ("non-fiction stories" or "documentaries"), short educational features on a variety of topics, such as what must be done before a plane can take off, how holes get into Swiss cheese or stripes into toothpaste. These are punctuated by a short cartoon with the mouse, often with one or more of its friends.

=== Introduction ===
The show starts with its theme music, unchanged since 1971. The introduction consists of a few bars of the theme and a German voice-over describing three topics in that week's show, ending with introducing the mouse, the elephant and the duck. The intro would be repeated once in a foreign language. Initially, Turkish, Spanish and Italian were used, in order to include the children of foreign guest workers (Gastarbeiter). Today, another foreign language would be introduced every week. The foreign language is shortly revealed after the intro with ever the same phrase, like "Das war... klingonisch!" In this way, the mouse introduced children to more than 100 different languages, not only the more commonly known languages like English, French or Spanish, but also more obscure languages like Aramaic and Afghan Dari, or fantasy languages like Klingon or "elephantese".

=== Animated interludes ===
Between the show's segments are "mouse spots", hand-drawn cartoons of 30 to 100 seconds that feature the orange mouse and its friends, a small blue elephant and a yellow duck. None of the characters speak. Unique and identifying sound effects, as well as music comprise the soundtrack as the characters interact and solve problems, often in contradiction to laws of nature, but very much within laws of the animated world. The animated interludes serve to separate the segments, offering young viewers a moment to relax, avoiding sensory overload from too rapid a succession of input.

- The mouse is orange with brown ears, arms and legs. In order to solve problems it can stretch its legs as long as it wants, jump a rope with its detachable tail or fetch tools from its body. Following more the laws of animation rather than their real-world example, the protagonist mouse is the biggest one of the three characters.
- The elephant is blue with yellow toenails and is smaller than the mouse. It can be characterized as curious, very strong, spontaneous and faithful. When it appears on the stage it trumpets loudly. It likes to sleep, or to laugh when the mouse has done something wrong. It appears in many of the Mouse-Spots.
- The duck is yellow (with orange beak and feet), smaller than the mouse but larger than the elephant, so that their relative sizes are exactly the opposite of those of their real-life counterparts. The duck is naughty and quacks loudly, "chaos comes onto the stage" anytime it appears. It appears in the mouse-spots less frequently than the elephant.

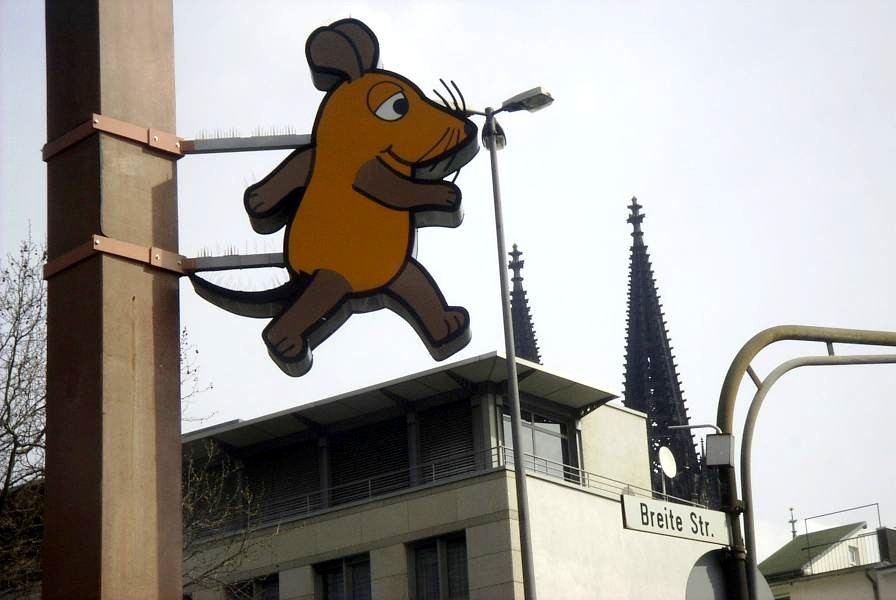
The mouse, mascot of the show

=== Educational film shorts ===
The idea for the educational film shorts came from one of the founders of the series, who noticed that children were very aware of the advertising on television. They were very well-made with very good photography and he got the idea to make "commercials" about reality. The first production answered the question, "Where do bread rolls come from?" Some 400 letters a week arrive at the production office, and a large part of each show is used for such features, often answering questions asked by viewers. Segments have covered such topics as:

- How re-usable hand warmers work
- How the Internet works
- How a hot-air balloon flies
- How to make electricity from lemons, enough to light a light bulb
- How a cell phone works
- How solar cells work
- How weather and temperature relate to each other

A complete list of all documentary stories broadcast to this day is collected on the website of the show.

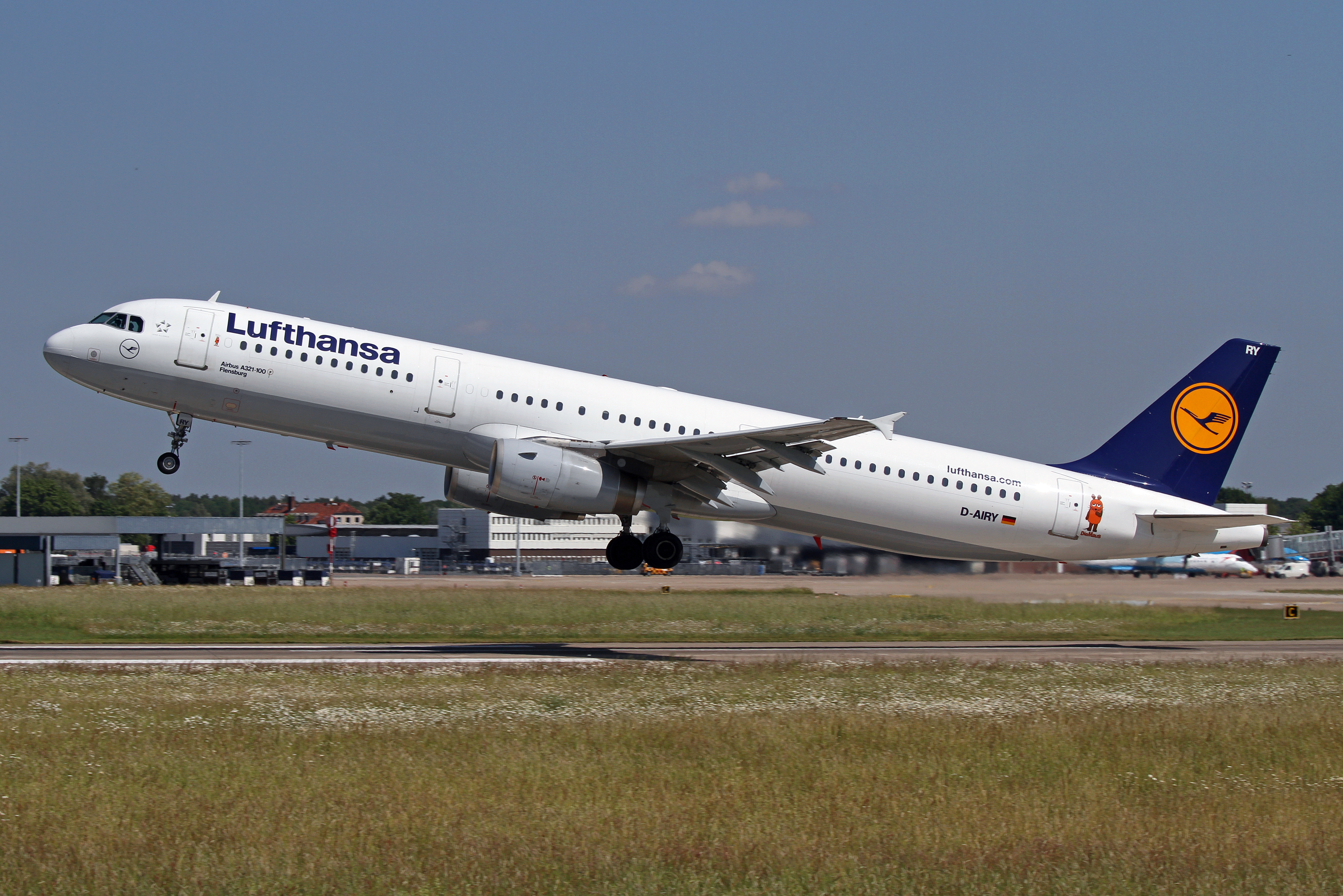
Lufthansa Airbus A321-100 D-AIRY “Flensburg” with the Mouse

A stuffed toy "Mouse" flew into outer space and was a "guest" on board the Russian Mir space station, where it appeared in an educational segment. The stuffed toy was later brought back to the producers on earth. The mouse is often visually included as drawing, print or stuffed toy in documentary segments where a familiar focus point would serve an otherwise overwhelming experience.

A number of the educational segments have also dealt with difficult topics, such as life in Germany in the aftermath of World War II, the Chernobyl nuclear disaster and death. Care is taken to explain things in a way that is comprehensible to young children. Analogies are used to explain concepts, and often everyday items already known to most children are used to illustrate. For example, a segment on the Battle of the Teutoburg Forest was produced using Playmobil figures to represent the three Roman legions involved, a total of 16,500 soldiers. Wanting to convey how large a force that was, the program purchased 16,500 Playmobil toy figures and dressed them up as Roman soldiers, lining them up into columns as they would have appeared in real life. The columns of toy soldiers took up 200 meters. These toy Roman legions are now housed in three museums in different parts of Germany.

A segment on the internet shows messengers running through the hallways of a large building, delivering messages in envelopes (data packets) from the user to servers and back. The hallways represent the data lines and the offices were internet hosts. In just eight minutes, the program accurately describes how the internet functions in a manner simple enough for children to understand. In the case of industrially produced things, each step is shown in great detail, so one can actually see how, for example, a piece of metal is formed by a tool. If something happens too fast for the naked eye it is shown filmed in slow motion. After each step, usually the previous steps including the new one are recapped briefly to help children remember what they already saw. Concepts which are not visible at all are explained with some form of analogous portrayal.

The segments would include originally recorded sound and voice-over narration as the only spoken language, further advancing the comprehensibility for children. People appear silent in these segments and would even engage in silent acting, while the voice-over narrates the film. When appearing in the show, working staff of institutions like the German Railway could often be convinced by the production to contribute to the show with silent acting.

Accordingly, the language used in the narration is kept very simple. The segments are usually narrated by an off-camera voice. Sentences are short. "Big words" are not used, and difficult concepts are broken down and described while they are being shown on camera. This is designed to free children from the more abstract concepts and devices of language, thus giving their minds space to comprehend the concepts explained rather than having to struggle comprehending the language of the explanation. Nonetheless, the educational film shorts are such effective presentations of their subject matter, a number of them are used as teaching tools at universities and colleges.

=== Cartoon ===
Every show also has at least one cartoon. Some are old classics, like the adventures of Zdeněk Miler's Mole or newer cartoons, like Charlie and Lola or Trudes Tier ("Trudy's animal") (in German).

=== Käpt'n Blaubär ===
As the last part of some shows, Käpt'n Blaubär (Captain Bluebear) tells his pink, green, and yellow grandchildren a cock-and-bull story, which his grandchildren always doubt to be true. His sailor side-kick, Hein Blöd (Hein Stupid), a rat, was created as a buffoon, a device that allows freedom for his character to express things other characters cannot. The characters of Käpt'n Blaubär, his grandchildren, and Hein Blöd were created by Walter Moers and made popular by Moers' book, The 13 1/2 Lives of Captain Bluebear and Blaubär's appearance on Die Sendung mit der Maus. Käpt'n Blaubär is voiced by veteran German actor Wolfgang Völz, with deep timbre and an accent of the Low German common in coastal area of Germany. The scenes on board Blaubär's ship are made with Muppets-style puppets, while his stories are short animated films.

=== Shaun das Schaf ===
Käpt'n Blaubär is often replaced by the stop-action animation, Shaun the Sheep ("Shaun das Schaf"), and one episode of The Mouse featured a visit to Aardman Animations, showing how Shaun is produced. This educational film short, broken up into segments because of its complexity and length, showed the various stages of production and the amount of work required to create a single episode of Shaun. The episode of Shaun seen in production was then broadcast in its finished state at the end of that Mouse.

=== Schnappi ===
One episode featured a little crocodile named Schnappi (Snappy) singing about his life in Egypt on the Nile. The song went viral in Germany and became a hit in other countries as well.

== Awards ==
Die Sendung mit der Maus and its creators continue to receive high praise from both television critics and pedagogic experts. The most notable of the roughly 75 awards won by the show and its creators are:

- 1973 Golden Bambi
- 1985 Ernst Schneider Award
- 1988 Adolf Grimme Award in Gold
- 1993 Deutscher Fernsehpreis, special prize
- 1995 Bayerischer Fernsehpreis awarded for the special Postwar Mouse (Armin Maiwald)
- 1995 Order of Merit of the Federal Republic of Germany to Armin Maiwald and Christoph Biemann
- 1996 Goldene Kamera
- 2002 Ernst Schneider Award
- 2005 Georg von Holtzbrinck Prize for Science Journalism
- 2006 IQ Award

== International versions ==
The program is today seen in almost 100 countries.

In countries outside of Germany that carry the English-dubbed version of the show, Die Sendung mit der Maus airs under the title of Mouse TV. The program retains much of its original format, but the dialogue and narration have been dubbed into English. The English version was created in Australia and aired in the United States as part of the Nickelodeon series Pinwheel, on Astro TVIQ in Malaysia and Brunei, ABC TV in Australia, TVRI in Indonesia, Kuwait Television in United Arab Emirates and State of Palestine, TVE1, TVE2, ETB 1, TV3 and Clan TVE in Spain, Rai 1 in Italy, France 3 in France, RTP1, RTP2 and Canal Panda in Portugal, Thai PBS in Thailand and TV Cultura in Glub Glub on Brazil, and Canal Once in Mexico.

To encourage French children to learn German and vice versa, the program began airing on Arte, a Franco-German television channel, on Sunday mornings, beginning October 2005. In Germany, the show is dubbed into French and in each country, subtitles appear in the local language. In French, the program is called La souris souriante (The smiling mouse). In Bolivia and in El Salvador, the show aired in Spanish as El cajón de los juguetes (The toys box).

In Japan, a part of short films was broadcast by NHK ETV and Cartoon Network as Daisuki! Mausu (だいすき!マウス) as part of the "2005/2006 Deutschland in Japan" bilateral exchange programme between WDR and NHK.

The show was aired in Dutch called Het Programma met de Muis, which was aired on Nederland 1, as part of Nederlandse Omroep Stichting from 1973 until 1975.

== Spin-off ==
Die Sendung mit dem Elefanten (The show with the elephant) is a spin-off aimed at pre-school children, which started in 2007 and consists mainly of little stories, songs and games.
