= Die Sendung mit dem Elefanten =

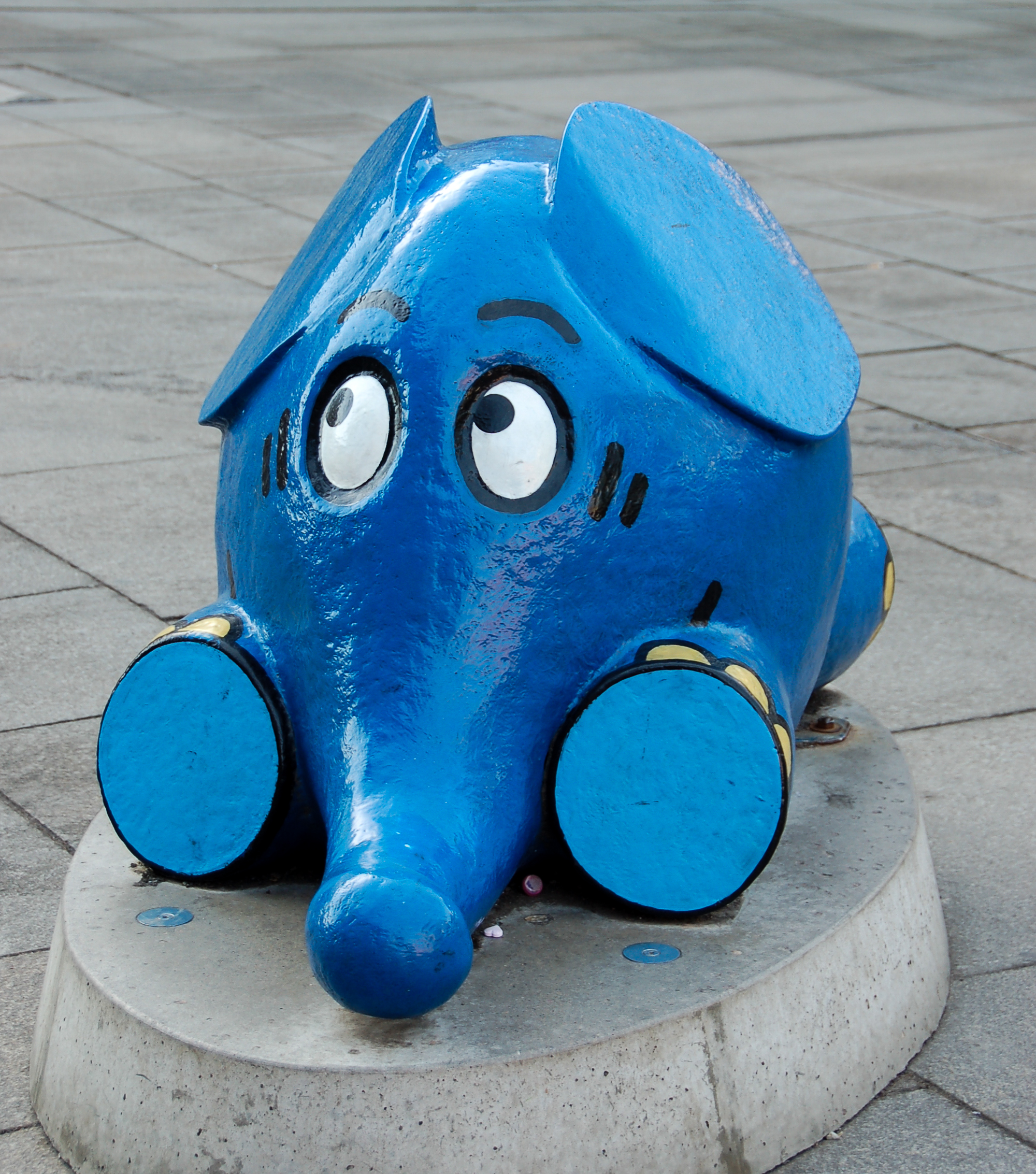
- The Elephant, mascot of the show
- Genre: Comedy
- Created by: Dieter Saldecki; Armin Maiwald
- Based on: Die Sendung mit der Maus by Dieter Saldecki; Gert Kaspar Müntefering; Armin Maiwald
- Starring: Armin Maiwald
- Country of origin: Germany
- Original language: German
- No. of seasons: 9
- No. of episodes: 250

Production
- Running time: 30 min.

Original release
- Network: Das Erste
- Release: September 10, 2007 – present

Related
- Die Sendung mit der Maus

Die Sendung mit dem Elefanten (The Program with the Elephant) is a German television series and a spin-off of Die Sendung mit der Maus. It follows the story of a blue elephant and his friend, a pink rabbit.

== See also ==
- List of German television series
