= Florence Randrianarisoa =

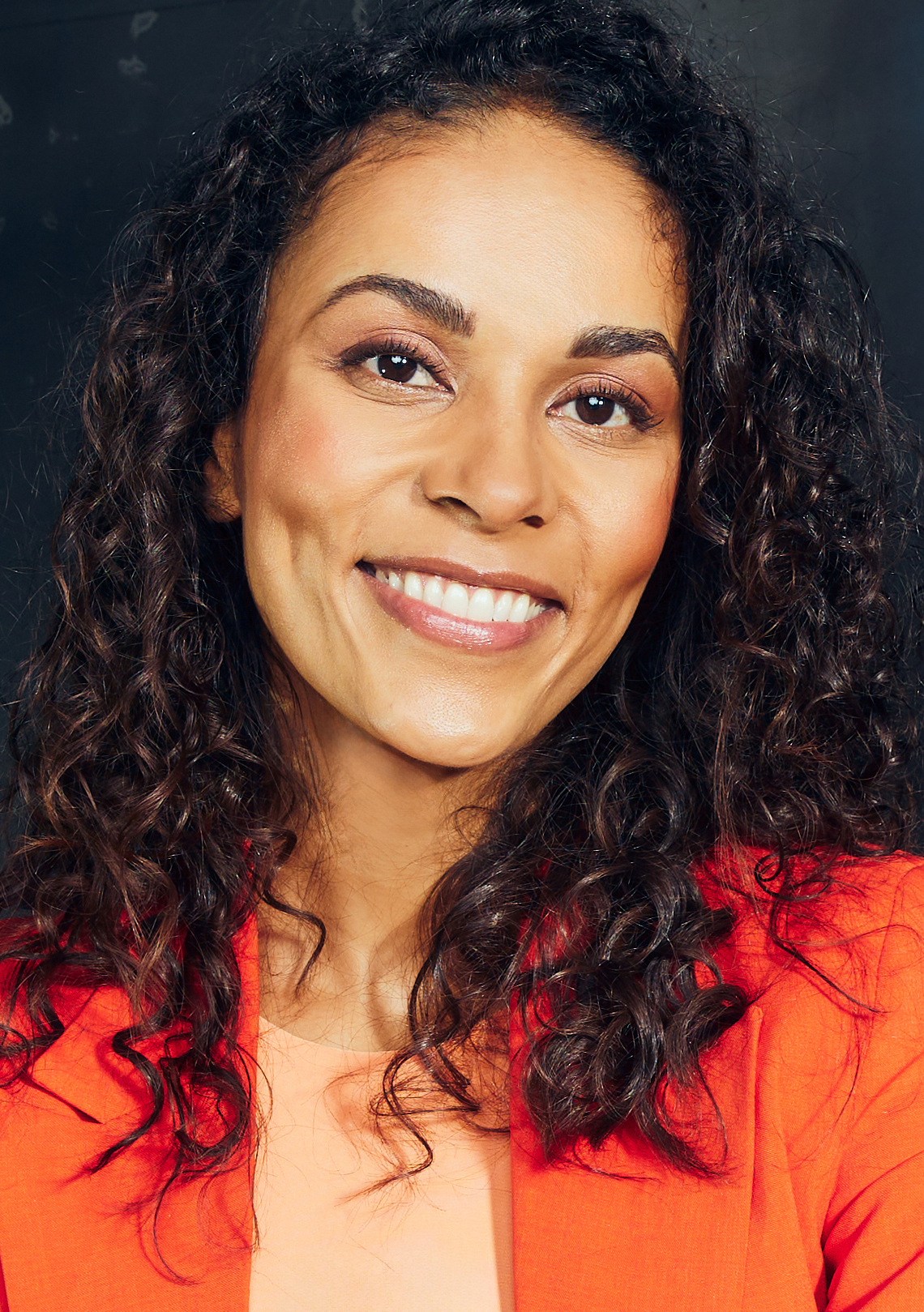
- Florence Randrianarisoa in 2023
- Born: January 18, 1987 (age 39); Querfurt, East Germany
- Education: University of Cologne
- Occupations: Doctor, television presenter

Florence Randrianarisoa is a German television presenter, doctor, YouTuber and author on WDR for the television show Quarks.

== Biography ==
Randrianarisoa was born in Querfurt and was raised in Wutha-Farnroda. In 2014, she created a YouTube channel under the alias Dr. Flojo.
