= WDR Fernsehen =

German free-to-air television network

- Logo used since 2016
- Country: Germany
- Broadcast area: North Rhine-Westphalia, also distributed nationally
- Headquarters: Cologne, Germany

Programming
- Picture format: 1080p HDTV (downscaled to 720p HDTV and 16:9 576i for the DTT and SDTV feeds, respectively)

Ownership
- Owner: Westdeutscher Rundfunk

History
- Launched: 17 December 1965; 60 years ago
- Former names: Westdeutsches Fernsehen (1965–1988); West 3 (1988–1994)

Links
- Website: http://www.wdr.de/tv/

Availability

Terrestrial
- Digital terrestrial television: North Rhine-Westphalia: Channel 3

Streaming media
- WDR.de: Watch live
- Ziggo GO (Netherlands): ZiggoGO.tv (Europe only)
- Horizon: Horizon.tv (Switzerland only)

WDR Fernsehen is a German free-to-air television network owned and operated by Westdeutscher Rundfunk and serving North Rhine-Westphalia. It is one of the seven regional "third programmes" television stations that are offered within the federal ARD network.

== History ==
The station began broadcasting on 17 December 1965, as Westdeutsches Fernsehen (WDF), changing its name to West 3 in 1988, before settling for WDR Fernsehen in 1994.

Originally airing only in North Rhine-Westphalia, the channel has become available across Germany with the advent of Cable TV and satellite television. The station is also available free-to-air across Europe via Astra 19.2°E.

In November 2013, the channel faced a graphical rebrand.

== News sub-regions ==
WDR Fernsehen operates eleven sub-regional opt-out services, each broadcasting a 30-minute local news programme entitled Lokalzeit at 19.30 each Monday to Saturday evening together with a shorter, 5-minute bulletin at 18.00 on Mondays to Fridays:

- Aachen: Lokalzeit aus Aachen
- Wuppertal: Lokalzeit Bergisches Land
- Bonn: Lokalzeit aus Bonn
- Dortmund: Lokalzeit aus Dortmund
- Duisburg: Lokalzeit aus Duisburg
- Düsseldorf: Lokalzeit aus Düsseldorf
- Cologne: Lokalzeit aus Köln
- Münster: Lokalzeit Münsterland
- Bielefeld: Lokalzeit OWL aktuell
- Essen: Lokalzeit Ruhr
- Siegen: Lokalzeit Südwestfalen

== Programmes ==
=== Children ===
- Die Sendung mit dem Elefanten (2007–present)
- Die Sendung mit der Maus (1971–present)

=== Entertainment ===
- Die Wiwaldi-Show (2012–2016)
- Zimmer frei (1996–2016)

=== Information ===
- Aktuelle Stunde (1983–present)
- WDR aktuell (1994–present)
- Frau tv (1997–present)
- Lokalzeit (1996–present)
- Westpol (1992–present)

=== Series ===
- Eyewitness (Øyevitne) (2017)
- In aller Freundschaft (2003–present)
- Lindenstraße (1997–present)
- Phoenixsee (2016–present)
- Prey (Prey - Die Beute) (2015–2016)
- Rote Rosen (2007–2009)
- Sturm der Liebe (2005–2009)
- Schimanski (1998–2016)
- Tatort (2006–present)
- The Game (2015)

=== Sport ===
- Sport Inside (2007–present)
- Zeiglers wunderbare Welt des Fußballs, hosted by Arnd Zeigler (2007–present)

=== Talk ===
- B. trifft..., hosted by Bettina Böttinger (1993–2004)
- Domian, hosted by Jürgen Domian (1995–2016)
- Domian live, hosted by Jürgen Domian (2019–present)
- Kölner Treff, hosted by Bettina Böttinger (2006–present)

== Logos ==
Logo of the predecessor of WDR Fernsehen called West 3 (1988–1994)

Used from 1994 until 2013

Alternative logo, 1994–2013

Used from 1994 until 2013

Used from 2013 until 2016

HD logo used from 2013 to 2016

Used from 2016

Used from 2016

HD logo used from 2016 until 12 December 2019

HD logo used from 13 December 2019
