= Ernst-Schneider-Preis =

German journalism award

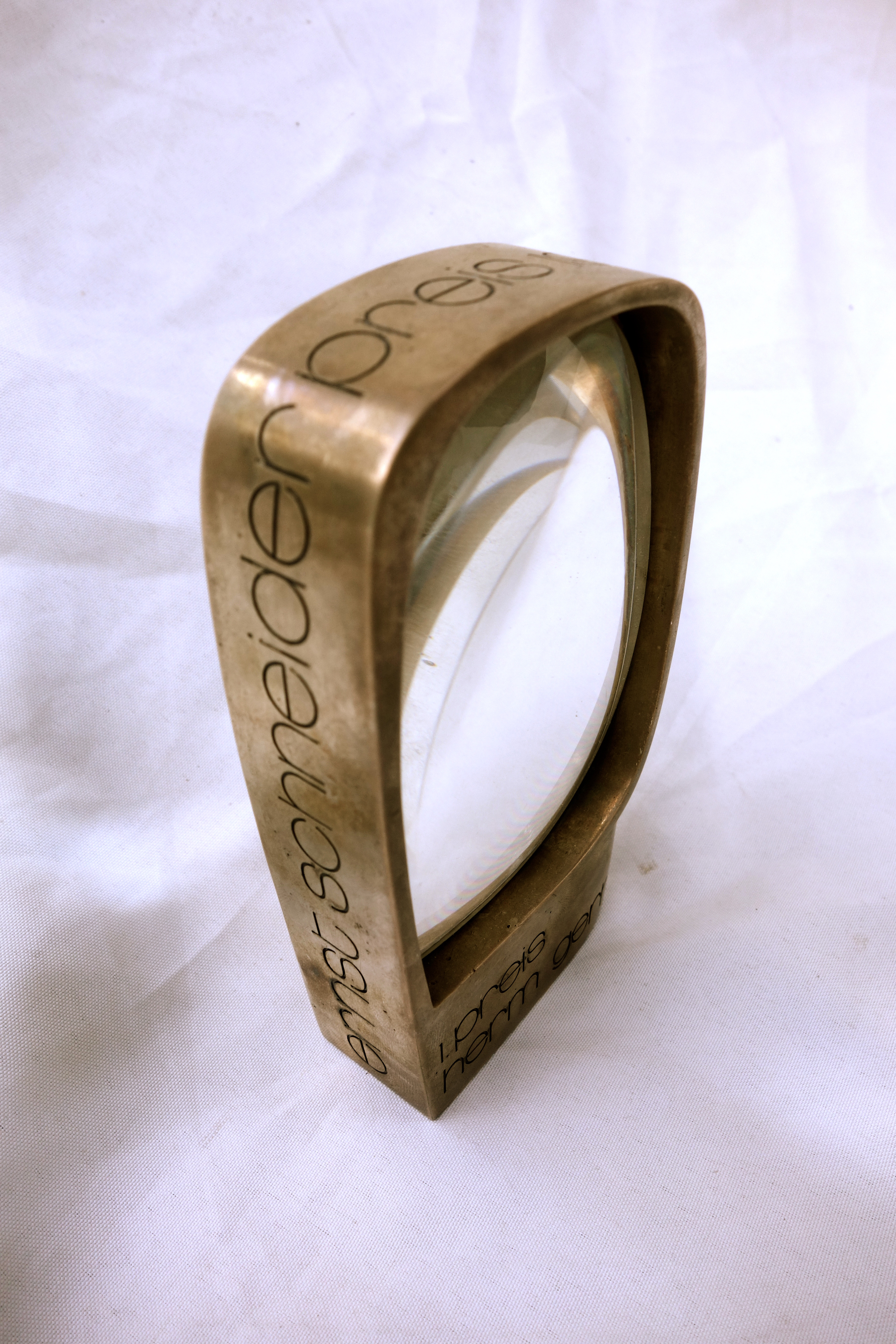
First Ernst-Schneider-Preis from 1971

The Ernst-Schneider-Preis (German for Ernst Schneider Prize) is a German journalism prize awarded for excellence in reporting in the area of economics. It is named after the German entrepreneur and art patron Ernst Schneider, who was president of the German Chamber of Commerce from 1963 to 1969. Funded by the German Chambers of Commerce, the goal of the prize is to increase public knowledge and understanding of business issues. The prize is given annually to journalists who "convey management expertise and knowledge of economic relationships in an understandable manner, and thus contribute to the representation of a liberal and social economic order."

The Ernst Schneider Prize has evolved over the years to the largest competition for economic journalism, endowed with €52,500. Winners are chosen by a three-person jury, which evaluates the relevance of the theme, the quality of information, and the comprehensibility and attractiveness of presentation. Prizes are awarded in the following categories, as of 2016:

- Large business program (7,500 euros) for television and radio
- Short contribution (worth 5,000 euros) for television and radio
- Innovation / business in entertainment (5,000 Euros) here competing television, radio, print and online
- Economy in regional print media (7,500 euros)
- Economy in national print media (7,500 euros)
- Promotion (2,500 euros)
- Business Online (5,000 euros)
