= Kika (TV channel) =

German free-to-air television channel

- Logo used since 2012
- Broadcast area: Germany; Austria; Switzerland; Liechtenstein; Belgium; Luxembourg; South Tyrol (Italy)
- Headquarters: Erfurt, Germany

Programming
- Language: German
- Picture format: 720p HDTV

Ownership
- Owner: ARD and ZDF

History
- Launched: 1 January 1997 (29 years ago)
- Former names: Der Kinderkanal (1997–2000)

Links
- Website: www.kika.de

Availability

Terrestrial
- Digital terrestrial television: Multiplexes vary depending on location

Streaming media
- kika.de: Watch live

Kika (currently stylised as KiKA, formerly as KI.KA; formally Der Kinderkanal von ARD und ZDF, transl. The Children's Channel of ARD and ZDF) is a German free-to-air television channel based in Erfurt, Germany. It is managed by a joint venture by public-service broadcasters ARD and ZDF. Its intended audience is children and the youth, devoid of advertising, and it is generally watched by children 3 to 13. The MDR is responsible for its playout.

The channel also repeats shows, such as Tabaluga tivi from ZDF's main channel.

As of 2026, most of KiKA's older shows are now archived, streamed and available to watch on Amazon Prime Video and YouTube in Germany.

== History ==
In the channel’s early years, the program consisted mostly of series and shows that were already being broadcast on ARD and ZDF. Whole programs were being broadcast simultaneously on the main channels and the children’s channel, for example the afternoon program of ZDF. Kika showed German as well as international series, like cartoon classics from the 1970s and 80s (Heidi, Biene Maja, Wickie, Little Amadeus or Nils Holgersson). Classics of children’s TV like film versions of Astrid Lindgren books or the Augsburger Puppenkiste were also regularly being broadcast.

After a time, more original broadcasts started appearing in Kika’s program, like Schloss Einstein, and The Tribe.

The all-girl popular music band Saphir was formed of the 2007-2010 winners of the talent show KI.KA LIVE — Beste Stimme gesucht! (Best Voice Wanted).

In July 2020, Kika announced that it would participate in the Junior Eurovision Song Contest for the first time, with an entry for the 2020 edition written by singer-songwriter Levent Geiger, a finalist of Dein Song in 2015 and 2019. The performer was decided in the national final Dein Song für Warschau, won by Susan Oseloff.

SD broadcasting was discontinued on 18 November 2025, and since 31 December 2025, KiKA has been broadcasting without the "HD" suffix in its channel logo.

By 2033, the broadcaster is set to be transformed from a traditional television channel into a purely digital service. Media education experts criticize this, pointing to the value of a curated, age-appropriate broadcast sequence for children's media literacy.

== Programming ==
Since launch, Kika has aired animated and live-action series; however, due to changes in the programming, the former now predominate (85%). Besides animated series, the afternoon soap opera Schloss Einstein is currently the only live-action series in Kika's lineup during the day. There are only two other live-action shows, one of which is aired in the afternoon and the other in the evening. Some series, such as Pet Alien, Being Ian, and Jakers! The Adventures of Piggley Winks, are aired daily, as Kika previously used to air different programming on weekdays and weekends. Separately, many programmes, especially older series, such as Pan Tau, Pippi Longstocking, and Es war einmal, can be seen only on the ZDF and regional channels.

The channel sometimes airs repeats of old series. Similar to private TV channels, these series are broadcast as double features. Much of the older series which were broadcast from 1997 to 2004 are excluded from the lineup, partly due to ARD and ZDF no longer owning the broadcast rights.

One of Kika's older programmes, Augsburger Puppenkiste, origuinally aired on Saturday and Sunday mornings and later went on hiatus four years but returned to the channel's lineup in April 2008.

Kika airs at least two movies a week on Fridays and Sundays; often animated films rather than live-action films.

== Mascot ==
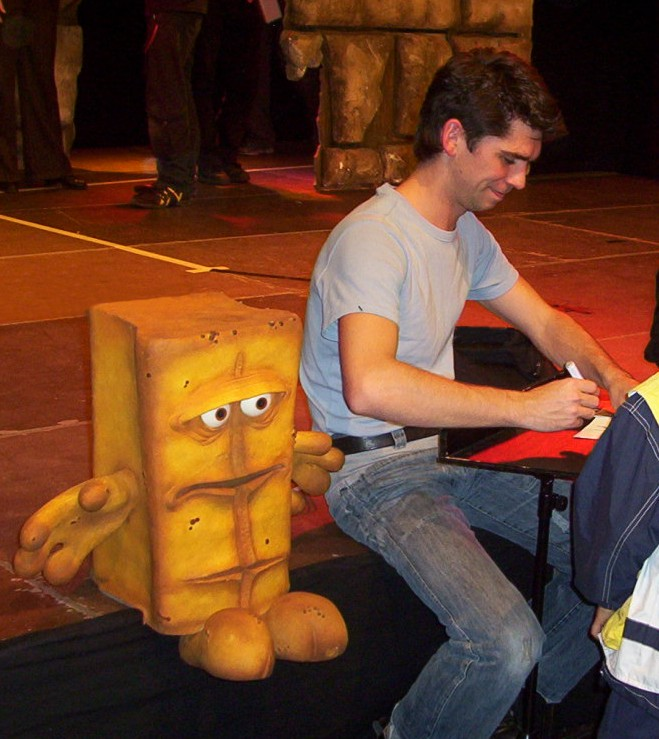
Bernd das Brot and puppeteer Jörg Teichgraeber during an autograph session

Kika's mascot is the puppet character Bernd das Brot, a chronically depressed loaf of bread.

== Announcers ==
The channel uses live continuity announcers. Four of the most popular announcers were Juri Tetzlaff (1997–2010), Karsten Blumenthal (1997–2004), Singa Gätgens (1997–2010), and Lukas Koch (2003–2009).

== Kikaninchen ==
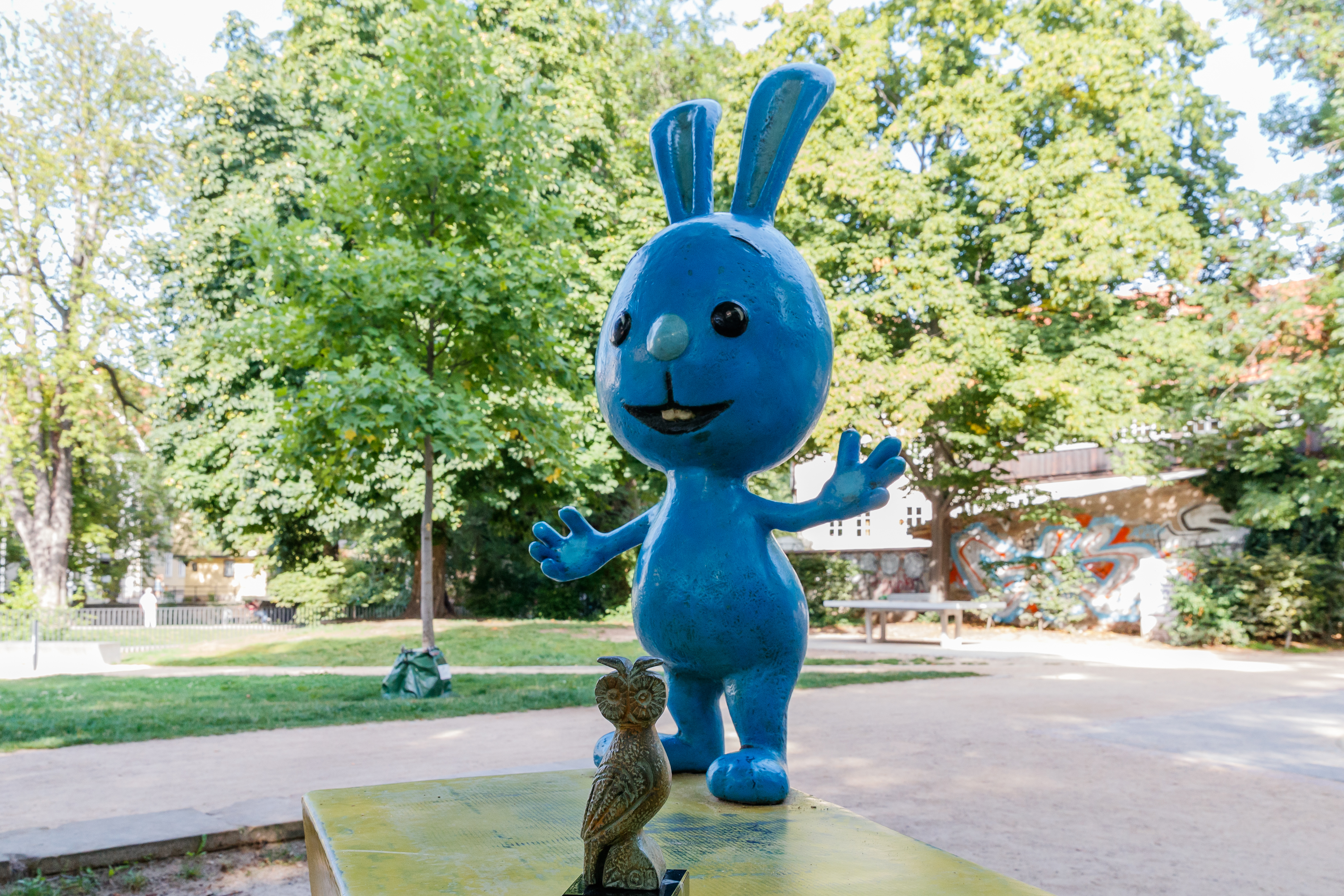
A statue of Kikaninchen

Kikaninchen is a segment on KiKA whose main character is a blue, friendly rabbit, that is very popular among children in Germany. Kikaninchen is known for its entertainment, engaging children in fun and educational games with its friends, as well as featuring preschool shows during the segment. Kikaninchen airs only on weekdays, between 6:10AM (after Logo!) and somewhere around 10:20AM (actual end time may vary). His friends are Anni, Jule and Christian. His famous catchphrase is "Dibedibedab"!

== Logos ==
1997 – 2000

2000 – 2005

2005 – 2008

2008 – 2012

Current logo since 14 February 2012

== See also ==
- List of German language television channels
