= Anne Will =

German television journalist and host

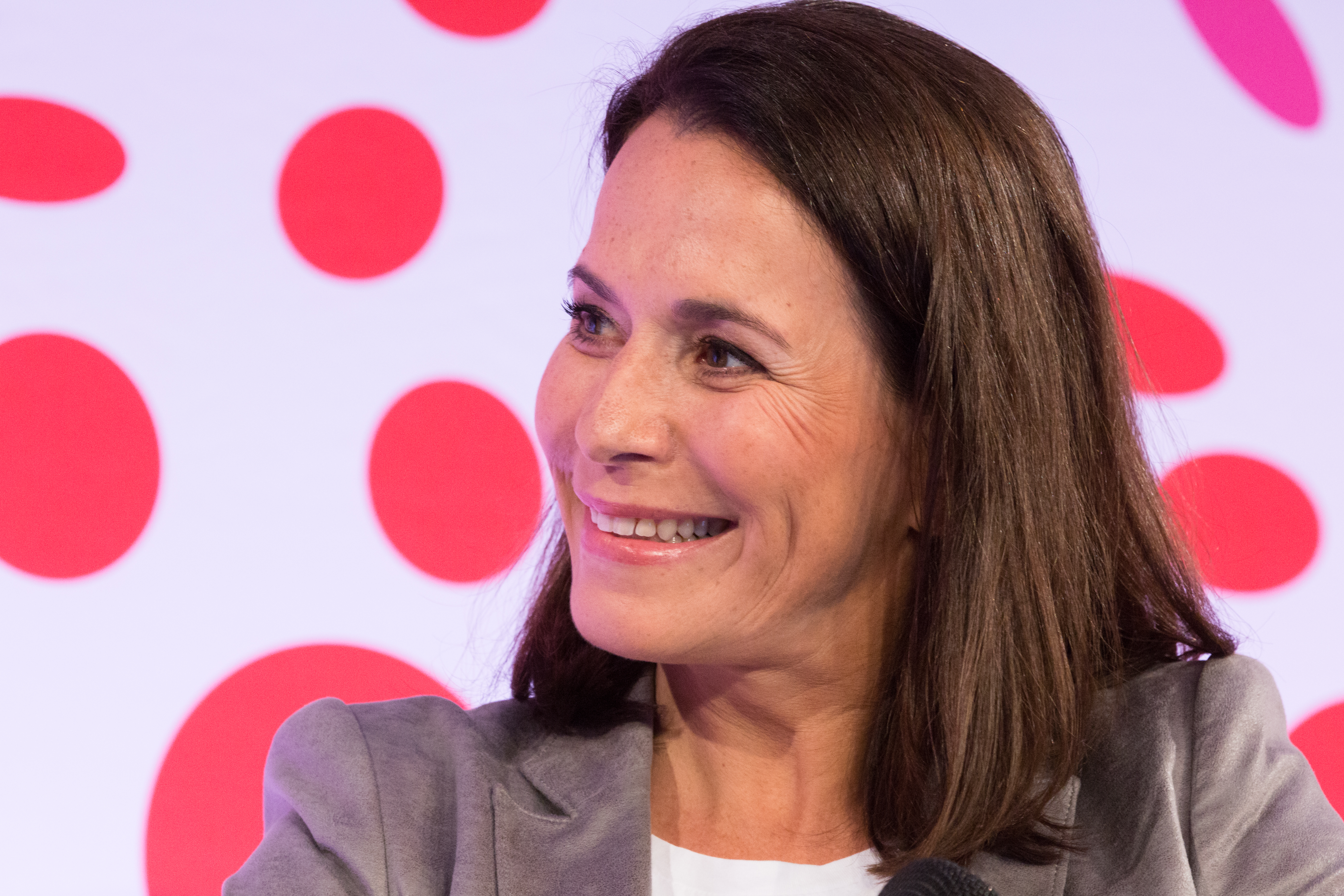
- Will in May 2018
- Born: Anne Will; 18 March 1966 (age 60); Cologne, West Germany (now Germany)
- Occupations: Television journalist; TV host
- Years active: 1990–present
- Spouse: Miriam Meckel (m. 2016; sep. 2019)
- Awards: Selection of awards

Anne Will (born 18 March 1966) is a German television journalist and host of the eponymous political talk show. She was anchorwoman of the daily Tagesthemen news broadcast on ARD from 2001 until 2007.

== Early life and career ==
Will was born on 18 March 1966 in Cologne, West Germany, the daughter of an architect. She grew up in Hürth and attended the Albert-Schweitzer-Gymnasium high school. From 1985 she studied history, politics, and English in Cologne and Berlin, with a scholarship of the Friedrich Ebert Foundation (FES). While a student she had articles published in the Kölnische Rundschau and Berliner Volksblatt newspapers. In 1990 she graduated with a Magister's degree from the University of Cologne.

== Career in television ==
Will began her career in radio and television at Sender Freies Berlin. At the end of 1992 she started presenting the talk show Mal ehrlich and the sports magazine Sportpalast. She hosted the Westdeutscher Rundfunk show Parlazzo from 1996 to 1998.

In November 1999 Will became the first woman to host the Sportschau sport show. During the 2000 Summer Olympics, she presented live sport shows from Sydney for the ARD.

From 14 April 2001 to 24 June 2007 she presented the late night news magazine Tagesthemen alternating with Ulrich Wickert and, from September 2006, with his successor Tom Buhrow.

=== Anne Will, 2007–2023 ===
Will's political talk show Anne Will ran from 16 September 2007 to 3 December 2023. It succeeded Sabine Christiansen's similar show when Christiansen retired. Will was succeeded at the Tagesthemen by Caren Miosga.

Alongside Maybrit Illner, Peter Kloeppel and Stefan Raab, Will also moderated the only TV election debate between incumbent Chancellor Angela Merkel and her competitor Peer Steinbrück ahead of the 2013 elections, which was aired live on four of Germany's most-watched television channels during prime-time. She also interviewed Merkel in September 2009 (shortly before the 2009 election), in October 2015, in February 2016, November 2016 and in June 2018 (following the 44th G7 summit). She hosted Merkel's successor Olaf Scholz for the first time in March 2022. Among the international dignitaries who appeared on the show were the foreign ministers of Austria and Luxembourg, Sebastian Kurz (2016) and Jean Asselborn (2014, 2015 and 2018).

In 2010, Will interviewed former Chancellor Gerhard Schröder for daily newspaper Süddeutsche Zeitung.

=== Later career ===
In 2024, Will launched a weekly interview podcast, Politik mit Anne Will (Politics with Anne Will).

== Other activities ==
An active contributor to the Kindernothilfe and UNICEF charities, Will is also involved in projects aiming to eliminate landmines. On 2 July 2005, she hosted the German stage event of the Live8 in front of the Siegessäule in Berlin. She also serves as Ambassador for the Room of Names of the Memorial to the Murdered Jews of Europe in Berlin.

== Personal life ==
Will lives in Berlin. From 2016 until 2019 she was married to Miriam Meckel, then editor-in-chief of the major German magazine WirtschaftsWoche and professor of communications and media at the Swiss University of St. Gallen. Will is Roman Catholic.

== Awards (selection) ==
- 2002: Goldene Kamera
- 2006: German Television Award
- 2007: Hanns Joachim Friedrichs Award
