= Léa Steinacker =

German entrepreneur, social scientist and journalist (born 1989)

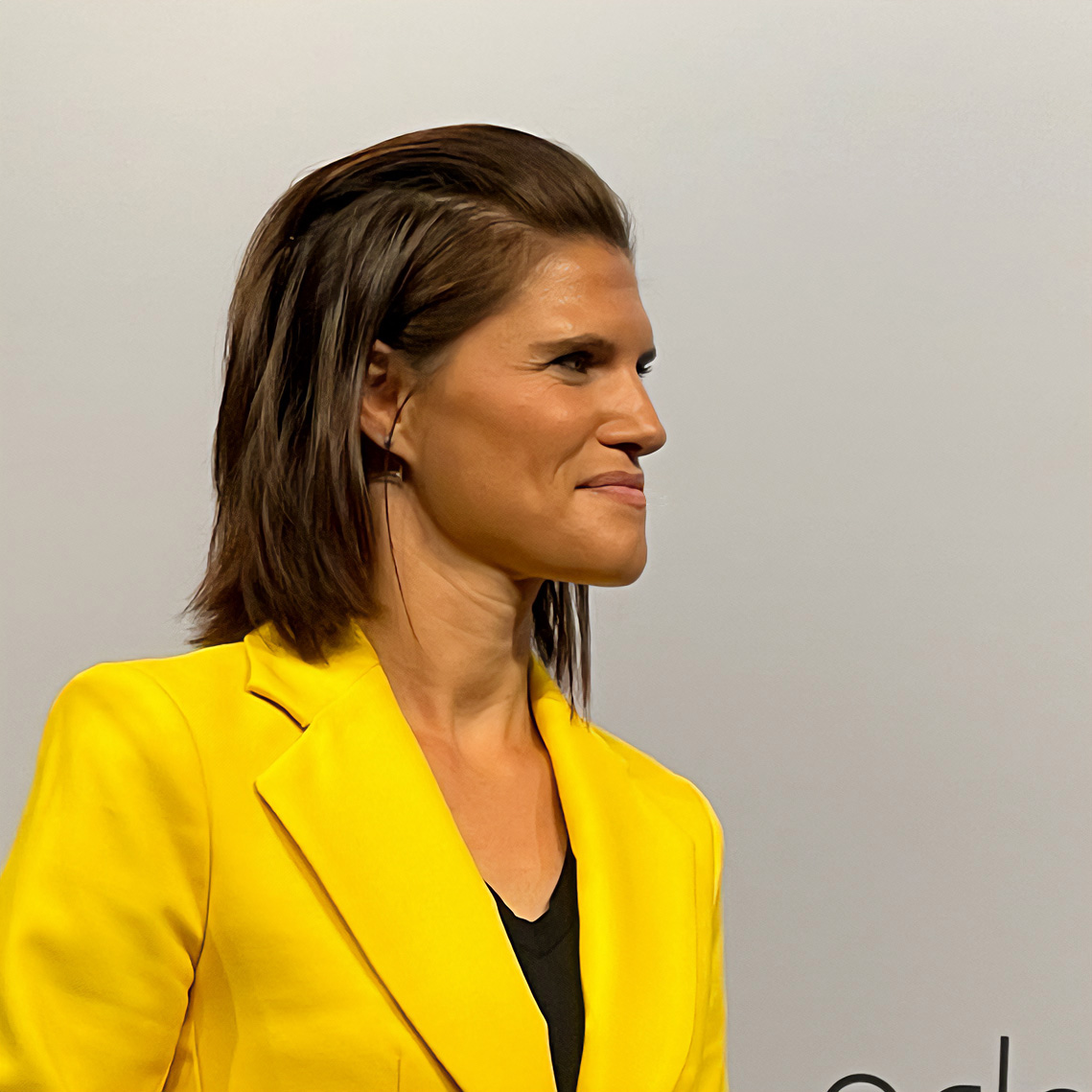
- Steinacker in 2023
- Born: 1989 (age 36–37); West Germany
- Known for: Artificial Intelligence

Academic background
- Education: UWC Atlantic; Princeton University; Harvard Kennedy School; University of St. Gallen
- Thesis: Code Capital: A Sociotechnical Framework to Understand the Implications of Artificially Intelligent Systems from Design to Deployment (2022)

Academic work
- Discipline: Sociologist
- Website: www.leasteinacker.com

Léa Steinacker (born 1989) is a German researcher, entrepreneur, keynote speaker and author whose work focuses on how technology interacts with people, organizations, and the planet. Artificial intelligence, AI ethics, feminism and social justice are key themes within her work and she frequently writes, presents, and interviews others on these topics.

She has also worked as a journalist with prominent interviewees including digital activist Joy Buolamwini, writer Chimamanda Ngozi Adichie, and former German Chancellor Angela Merkel.

== Early life ==
Steinacker grew up in Walsrode, Germany. She excelled academically, skipping the sixth grade and winning the Lower Saxony state prize for English in 2003. She was active in sports, playing tennis as part of a Walsroder team competing nationally for a position in the German Jugend trainiert für Olympia (Youth Training for the Olympics) program.

== Education ==
In 2005, Steinacker moved to Wales to attend UWC Atlantic, and graduated with an International Baccalaureate Diploma in 2007.

In 2011, Princeton University awarded her with a Bachelor of Arts with honors in International Affairs and a minor in African Studies. Her senior thesis, "An ecological approach to the risks of female sex workers in rural Kenya," was supervised by Professor of Psychology Elizabeth Levy Paluck. Her attendance at Princeton was supported by the Davis United World College Scholars Program, where she was a class of 2011 scholar, and her studies included a year at The American University in Cairo. For her senior thesis research in Kenya, she was partially funded by the Adel Mahmoud Global Health Scholarship.

In 2015, Steinacker earned a Master of Public Policy at the Harvard Kennedy School and was a McCloy Fellow. She also participated in the first White House Summit on Countering Violent Extremism on the recommendation of Farah Pandith, who served previously as the first-ever special representative to Muslim communities.

In 2022, she completed her PhD at the University of St. Gallen. Her doctoral thesis, "Code Capital: A Sociotechnical Framework to Understand the Implications of Artificially Intelligent Systems from Design to Deployment," was advised by Prof. Dr. Damian Borth (Artificial Intelligence) and Prof. Dr. Veronica Barassi (Digital Anthropology).

== Career ==
During her time at Princeton, Steinacker interned at a Hanover radio station reporting on political news.

In the early 2010s, she focused on humanitarian and social justice work with NGOs in Bosnia-Hercegovina, Rwanda, and the Democratic Republic of Congo and provided first-person reports for the Walsroder Zeitung (Walsroder Newspaper) before being evacuated from Bukavu during the M23 rebellion.

After her studies at Harvard, she joined the Handelsblatt Media Group as a Digital Scout for Germany's leading business magazine WirtschaftsWoche, eventually becoming the Chief Innovation Officer of WirtschaftsWoche in 2017.

In 2018, WirtschaftsWoche created a professional development community focused on upskilling around technology-driven topics, called ada, with Steinacker assuming the role of "Chief Strategy Officer"

In October 2020, ada Learning GmbH was founded by Steinacker, Miriam Meckel, Verena Pausder and Handelsblatt Media Group, with Steinacker assuming the role of Founder and Chief Innovation Officer. In February 2024, she became the Executive Chairwoman of ada.

Since 2021, Steinacker is also a lecturer at the University of St. Gallen, Switzerland, teaching courses on technology such as "Social and Economic Impacts of Artificial Intelligence".

Together with other notable supporters including German TV anchor Dunya Hayali, she is an investor in the female soccer club FC Viktoria Berlin.

Her first book on artificial intelligence, "Alles überall auf einmal: Wie Künstliche Intelligenz unsere Welt verändert und was wir dabei gewinnen können" became an instant national bestseller, with both Spiegel and Manager Magazin ranking it among the top. It was subsequently published in English ("Everything Everywhere All At Once: How Artificial Intelligence Impacts Our World") and Korean.

She is a board member of Weleda since June 2024.

== Honors and awards ==
- 2011: Henry Richardson Labouisse Prize by Princeton University, an award of "$25,000 to each recipient to support research in developing countries by graduating seniors who intend to pursue a career devoted to problems of development and modernization."
- 2013: McCloy Fellowship to study at the Harvard Kennedy School of Government by the Studienstiftung (German Academic Scholarship Foundation).
- 2015: Munich Young Leader by the Munich Security Conference and Körber Stiftung.
- 2016: Young Leader by Atlantik-Brücke (Atlantic Bridge).

== Books ==
- Meckel, M.; Steinacker, L. (2024). Alles überall auf einmal: Wie Künstliche Intelligenz unsere Welt verändert und was wir dabei gewinnen können (in German). Rowohlt E-Book. ISBN 978-3-644-02104-4.
- Steinacker, L.; Nomos Verlagsgesellschaft (2022). Code Capital: A Sociotechnical Framework to Understand the Implications of Artificially Intelligent Systems from Design to Deployment. Nomos. ISBN 978-3-8487-8890-3.
