= Peter Limbourg =

German broadcast journalist

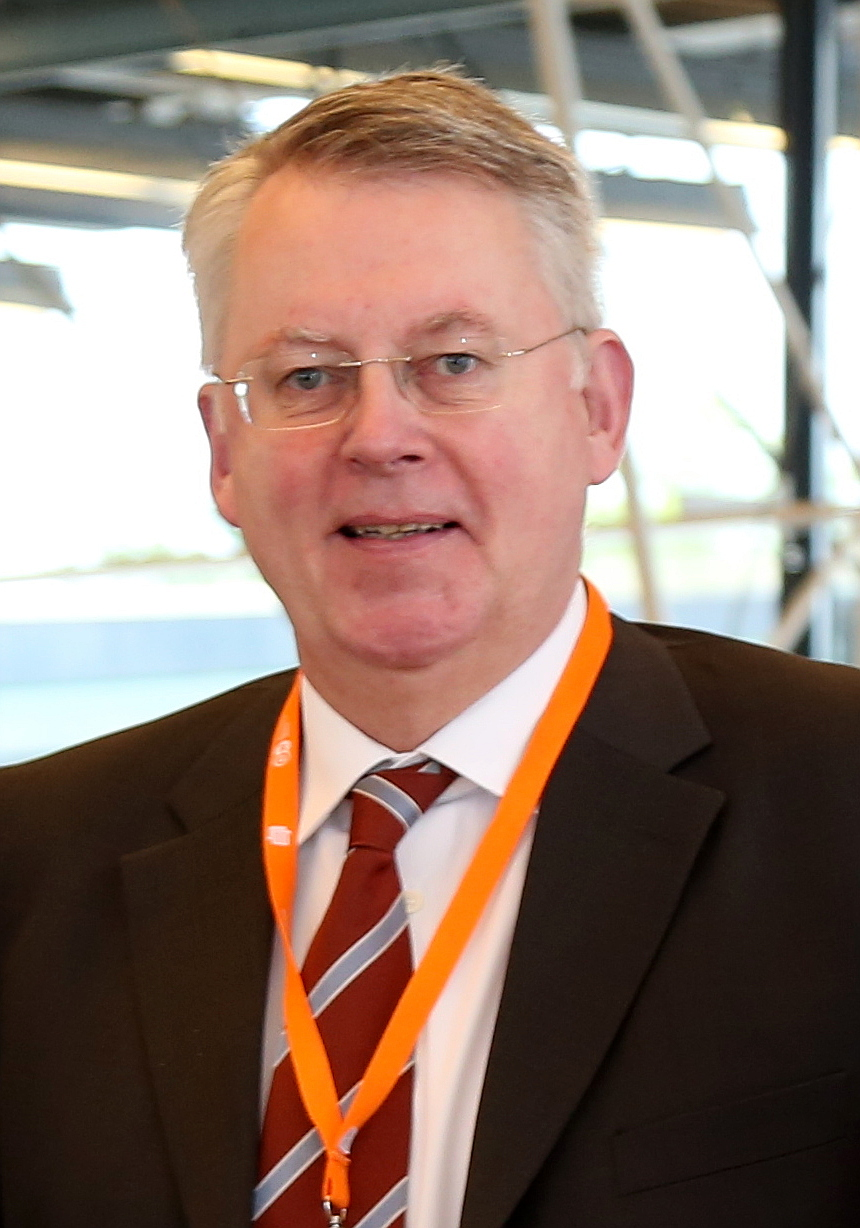
- Limbourg in 2015
- Born: 7 July 1960 (age 66)
- Occupation: Broadcast journalist

Peter Limbourg (born 7 July 1960) is a German broadcast journalist and the Director General of Deutsche Welle.

== Career ==
Alongside Peter Kloeppel, Limbourg moderated the first of two TV election debates between Chancellor Gerhard Schröder and his challenger Edmund Stoiber ahead of the 2002 elections, which was aired live on two of Germany's private television channels during prime-time.

Between 2008 and 2013, Limbourg was the main presenter of daily news show SAT.1 News. In addition, he served as Editor-in-Chief of N24 (2008–2010) and as Information Director of ProSiebenSat.1 Media (2010–2013).

In September 2016, Limbourg condemned Turkey for confiscating the recording of a Deutsche Welle interview with Youth and Sports Minister Akif Çağatay Kılıç at his office in Ankara, arguing that the seizure of the video tape was "a blatant violation of press freedom." Deutsche Welle reporter Michel Friedman had asked Kılıç questions about July's attempted coup, mass layoffs and arrests that followed the failed putsch, and the media situation and the position of women in Turkey.

== Other activities ==
- Aktion Deutschland Hilft (Germany's Relief Coalition), Member of the Board of Trustees
- Bonner Akademie für Forschung und Lehre praktischer Politik (BAPP), Member of the Board of Trustees
- Civis Media Foundation, Member of the Board of Trustees (since 2013)
- International Journalists’ Programmes (IJP), Member of the Board of Trustees
- Konrad Adenauer Prize, Member of the Advisory Board
- RIAS Berlin Commission, Co-chairman (alongside David Reinert)
- Reporters Without Borders Germany, Member of the Board of Trustees (until 2014)
