= Borth (disambiguation) =

Borth may refer to:

== Places ==
- Borth, coastal village in the county of Ceredigion, Mid Wales
  - Borth bog, or Cors Fochno
  - Borth railway station
- Borth, Wisconsin, unincorporated community in Waushara County, Wisconsin, United States
- Borth (Rheinberg), subdivision of Rheinberg, North Rhine-Westphalia, Germany

== People named Borth ==
- Frank Borth (1918–2009), American comic book artist
- Michelle Borth (born 1978), American actress
- Damian Borth (born 1981), German Computer Scientist
