= Strothe =

Strothe may refer to:

- Strothe (Lohne), a river of Lower Saxony, Germany that branches off the Lohne
- Strothe (Thune), the upper course of the Thune, a river of North Rhine-Westphalia, Germany
- Strothe, a district of Himbergen, a part of the former Samtgemeinde Bevensen in Lower Saxony, Germany
- Strothe, a district of Korbach, Hesse, Germany

== People with that surname ==
- Stephan Strothe, former US-correspondent for German news channel N24 as well as other affiliates of the ProSiebenSat.1 media group
