= Das Erste =

German public-service television channel

- Logo used since 2014
- Country: Germany
- Broadcast area: Germany, reaching bordering regions via overspill of the German terrestrial network
- Headquarters: Munich, Germany

Programming
- Language: German
- Picture format: 1080p HDTV (downscaled to 720p for digital satellite and cable)

Ownership
- Owner: ARD
- Sister channels: One; Tagesschau24; ARD-alpha

History
- Launched: 25 December 1952; 73 years ago
- Replaced: DFF1 (East Germany)
- Former names: NWDR-Fernsehen (1952–1954); Deutsches Fernsehen (1954–1984); Erstes Deutsches Fernsehen (1984–1996)

Links
- Website: www.daserste.de

Availability

Terrestrial
- Digital terrestrial television: Channel slots vary on each city

Streaming media
- DasErste.de: Watch live (Germany only)
- Ziggo GO (Netherlands): ZiggoGO.tv (Europe only)
- Horizon: Horizon.tv (Switzerland only)
- Canaldigitaal Live App: Live

Das Erste (German: [das ˈʔeːɐ̯stə]; "The First") is the flagship national television channel of ARD, an association of public broadcasting corporations in Germany, jointly operated by the nine regional public broadcasting corporations that are ARD members.

The channel was launched on 25 December 1952 as NWDR-Fernsehen and renamed Deutsches Fernsehen in 1954. Since 1996, the official brand is Das Erste; the full name Erstes Deutsches Fernsehen (First German Television) is still used before every major news edition. In colloquial speech, the station is usually called Erstes Programm ("First Channel"), or by its metonym, ARD.

== History ==
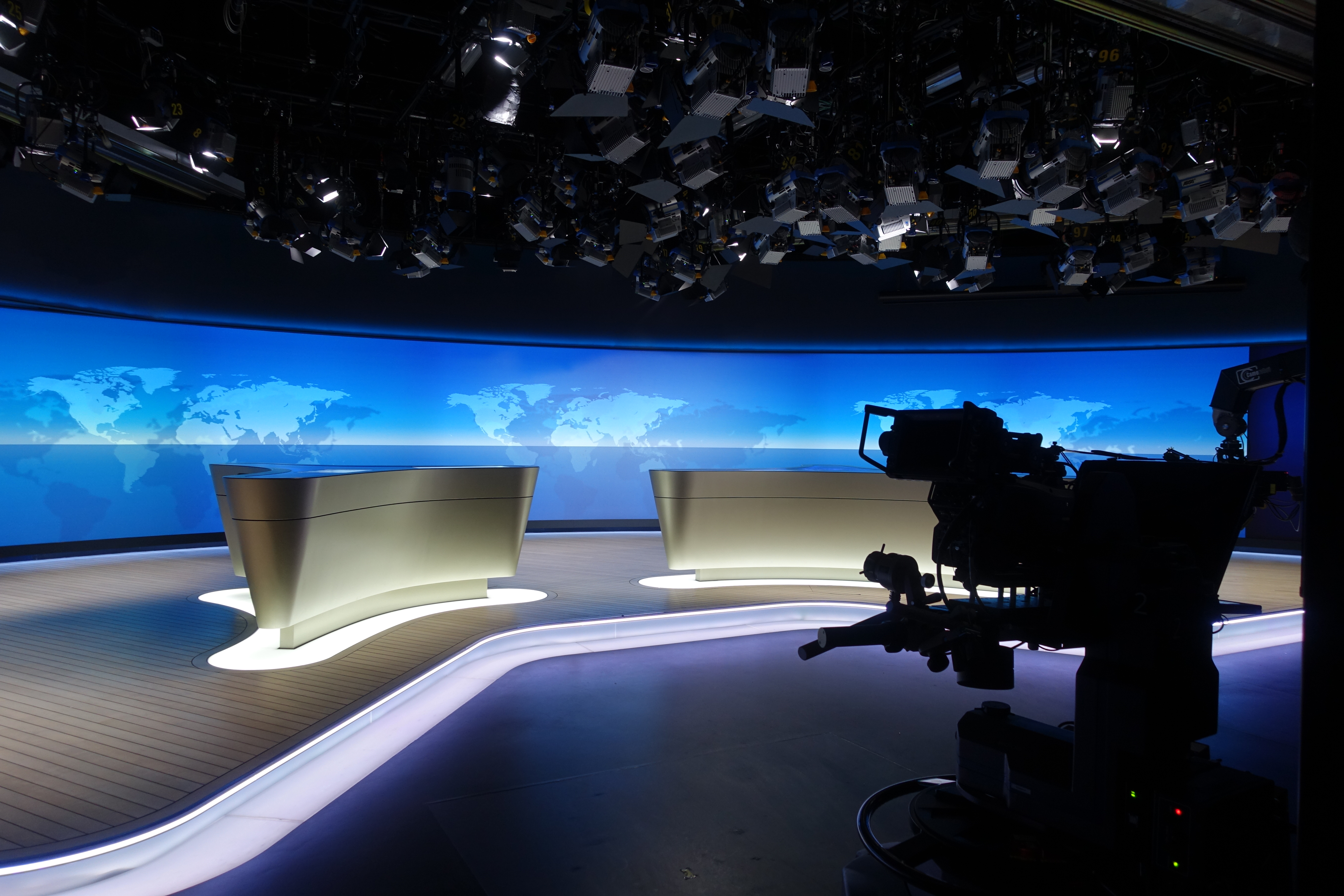
The studio of the news programme Tagesschau

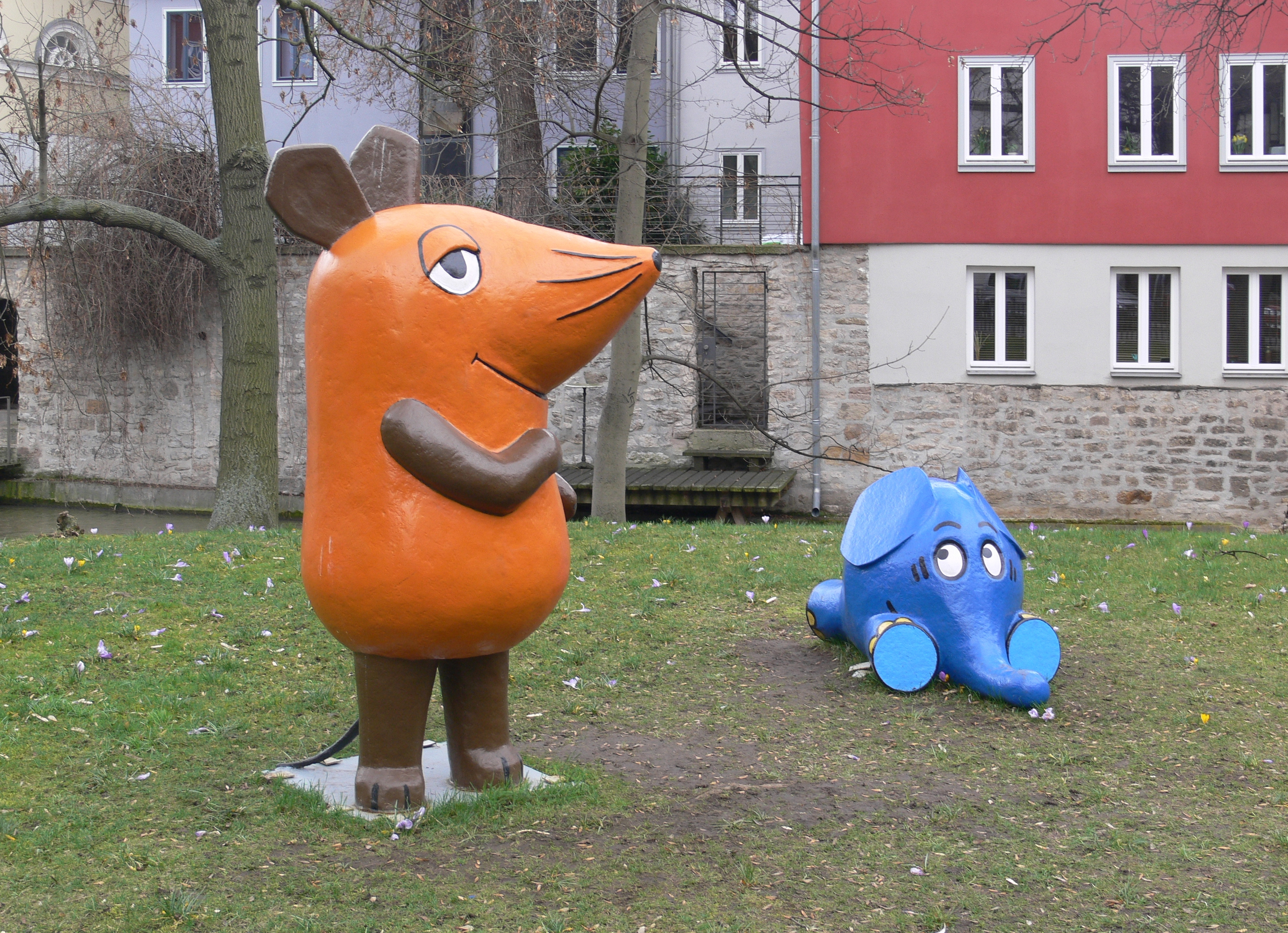
Statues of characters from Die Maus, a popular children's series

The channel's first experimental broadcast was on 27 November 1950 as the TV channel of the then NWDR, which in 1956 split into NDR and WDR. The regular NWDR television service started on 25 December 1952. Nationwide transmission began on 1 November 1954 within the ARD framework, under the name Deutsches Fernsehen ("German Television"). It was West Germany's only television channel before the establishment of ZDF in 1963.

The new channel consisted of jointly-produced shows such as the nightly news programme Tagesschau (on the air since 26 December 1952), as well as broadcasts produced individually by ARD member stations. The programs were coordinated by the Programmdirektion based in Munich. Besides several entertaining shows, ARD went political in 1957 when it launched its first political TV magazine, Panorama. Germany's first political TV show adopted the slogan "What is being talked about and what should be talked about" and pictured all aspects of postwar West German society—including conflict-laden topics, scandals, and other taboo topics, such as former Nazis who had held important roles.

ARD nevertheless produced a provisional second TV channel (ARD 2) from 1 June 1961 until ZDF started its transmissions on 1 April 1963. Colour television was introduced on 25 August 1967. Since 1 September 1995, Das Erste has broadcast 24 hours a day.

The channel's name was changed to Erstes Deutsches Fernsehen ("First German Television") on 1 October 1984. At the same time, a new corporate design was introduced, designed by Hans Bacher, along with new CGI idents produced by Cranston/Csuri Productions in Columbus, Ohio. The previous logo, with stylized waves, was replaced by a new logo showing a stylized number "1" which is still in use today. It changed its name to Das Erste on 1 January 1997, but the long name Erstes Deutsches Fernsehen is still used for some purposes (e.g. the introduction to the main editions of the Tagesschau). Informally, it is also known under the metonym ARD among viewers.

In addition to its SD broadcast, a 720p50 HD version of the channel, Das Erste HD, is also broadcast. Broadcast of Das Erste HD began in February 2010 with the coverage of the 2010 Winter Olympics in Vancouver, British Columbia, Canada. Das Erste HD is available via satellite (DVB-S2 on Astra 19.2°E), cable (all cable providers in Germany and some providers throughout Europe), IPTV (MagentaTV), encoded using H.264 AVC, and on digital terrestrial television in 1080p50, encoded using H.265 HEVC.

== Member broadcasting organizations ==
All nine of Germany's regional public-broadcasting organizations contribute to the output of Das Erste and broadcast its programming in a common schedule.

=== Time assigned ===
Each regional member of ARD contributes programming to the channel's schedule in proportion to the population of the area it serves. As of 2017, the time allocations as percentage shares of total broadcast hours were:

Broadcasting organisation	% of total
Bayerischer Rundfunk (BR)	16.25
Hessischer Rundfunk (HR)	7.45
Mitteldeutscher Rundfunk (MDR)	10.60
Norddeutscher Rundfunk (NDR)	17.50
Radio Bremen (RB)	0.75
Rundfunk Berlin-Brandenburg (RBB)	7.10
Saarländischer Rundfunk (SR)	1.25
Südwestrundfunk (SWR)	18.10
Westdeutscher Rundfunk (WDR)	21.00

== Broadcasting ==
Before 1990, Das Erste was only distributed in West Germany, and was almost exclusively broadcast using transmitters owned by the Deutsche Bundespost. However, the transmitters were powerful enough that Das Erste had a gigantic reach and could be accessed freely in neighboring countries and also in East Germany, where the channel recorded audiences much larger than the Deutscher Fernsehfunk (the former public broadcaster).Exceptions for the signal included Dresden, located in a deep valley in southeastern East Germany, and the area around Rügen island. Indeed, Das Erste's broadcasts, particularly the newscasts, were far more popular in East Germany than those of state broadcaster Deutscher Fernsehfunk. One popular nickname for ARD in East Germany was Außer Rügen und Dresden (except Rügen and Dresden).

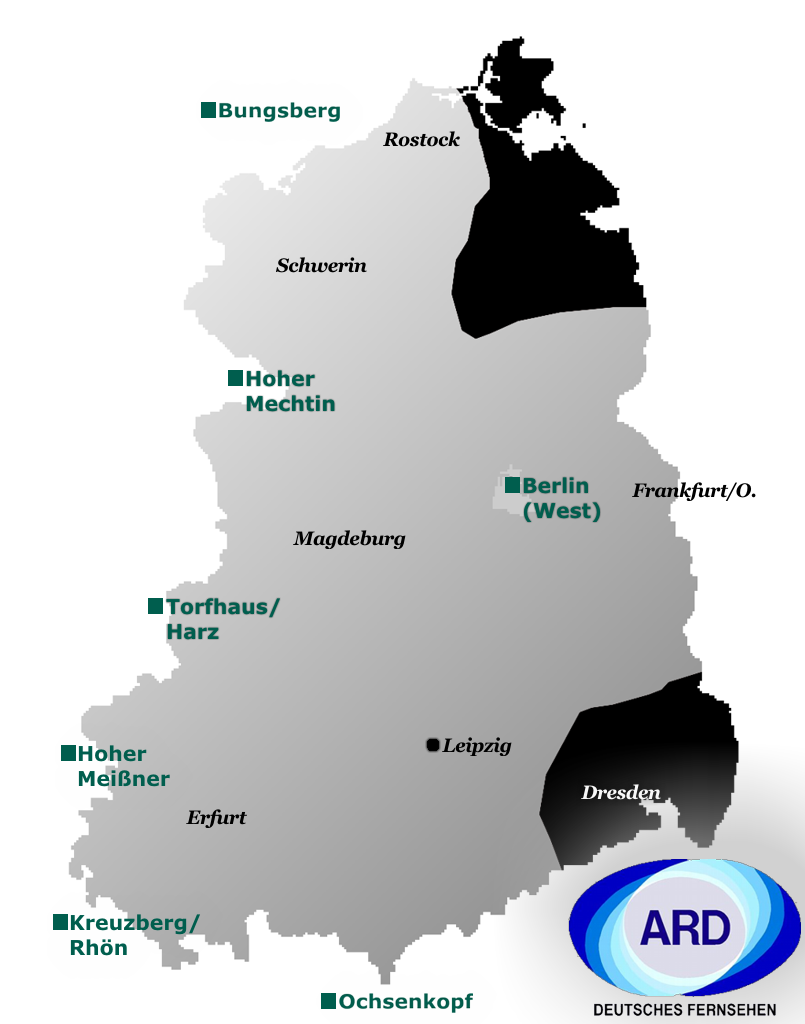
Areas with ARD/Das Erste reception in East Germany in grey with black areas having no reception (often jokingly referred to as Außer (except) Rügen und Dresden), and broadcasting transmitters near the inner German border

On 15 December 1990,following the reunification, programming from ARD was distributed by Deutsche Post of the GDR for the first time. The GDR-transmitters were later taken over by the Bundespost and merged organizationally with the West German transmitters. The transmitters of the Bundespost were transferred to Deutsche Telekom in 1995, and then in turn to T-Systems in 2000.

Between 2002 and 2008 the transmission facilities in Germany were successively converted from the analogue terrestrial PAL standard to the new digital terrestrial DVB-T television standard.

Das Erste is available throughout Europe on free-to-air digital satellite television via Astra, as well as on many cable providers. Transmission via the Hot Bird satellite was stopped on 1 April 2017.

== Logo history ==
1970–1984

1984–1996

1996–2003

2003–2015

2003–2015

2015–present

2015–present

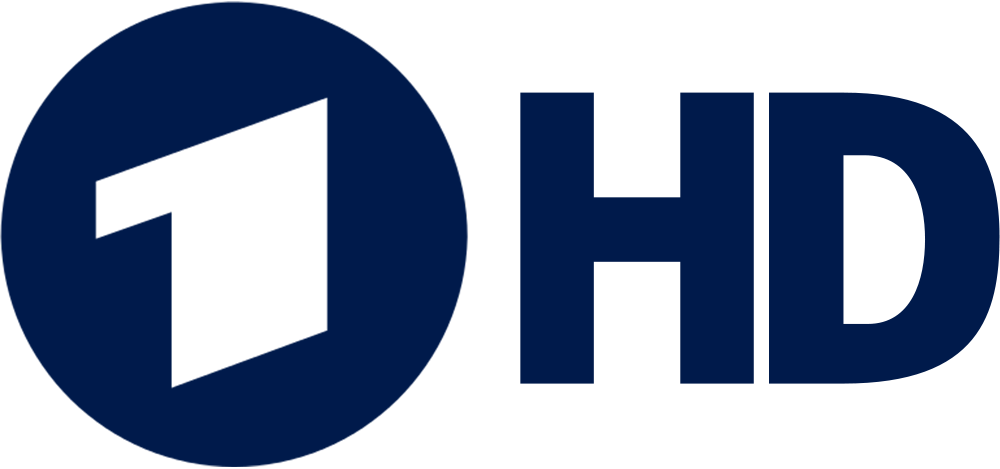
2015

2015–2025

== Programmes ==
=== Children ===
- Frag doch mal die Maus (WDR), hosted by Eckart von Hirschhausen (2006–present)
- Janoschs Traumstunde, children's programme (1986—1998)
- Sesamstraße (NDR), children's programme
- Die Sendung mit der Maus (WDR), children's programme

=== Entertainment ===
- Alfons und Gäste (SWR/SR) (2008–present)
- Die große Show der Naturwunder (SWR) (2006–present)
- extra 3 (NDR), political satire
- Gefragt - Gejagt, German version of The Chase (2015–present)
- Immer wieder Sonntags (SWR) (1995–present)
- Inas Nacht (NDR) (2009–present)
- Musikantenstadl (co-production with ORF and SRF) (1983–2015)
- Quizduell (NDR), hosted by Jörg Pilawa (2014–present)
- Paarduell (WDR) (2016–present)
- Spiel für dein Land - Das größte Quiz Europas (co-production with ORF and SRF), hosted by Jörg Pilawa (2015–present)
- Verstehen Sie Spaß? (SDR/SWR), hosted by Guido Cantz (1980–2021)

=== Information ===
- ARD-Morgenmagazin (WDR) (1992–present)
- ARD-Mittagsmagazin (RBB) (1989–present)
- Berliner Runde (SFB/RBB) (1999–present)
- Bonner Runde (WDR) (1972–1999)
- Brennpunkt (multiple) (1971–present)
- Brisant (MDR) (1994–present)
- Fakt (MDR) (1992–present)
- Kontraste (SFB/RBB) (1968–present)
- Monitor (WDR) (1965–present)
- Nachtmagazin (ARD Aktuell, NDR) (1995–present)
- Panorama (NDR) (1957–present)
- Plusminus (multiple) (1975–present)
- Presseclub (WDR) (1987–present)
- Presseschau (SFB) (1969–2002)
- Report (Report Mainz/Report München) (SWF/SWR/BR) (1960–present)
- Tagesschau (ARD Aktuell, NWDR/NDR) (1952–present)
- Tagesthemen (ARD Aktuell, NDR) (1978–present)
- Umschau (SFB/RBB/MDR) (1969–present)
- Weltspiegel (multiple) (1963–present)

=== Series ===
- Babylon Berlin (2018–present)
- Blankenese (1994, 2001–2002, 2005)
- Charité (2017)
- Die Stein (2008, 2011)
- Earth 2 (2008)
- Falcon Crest (1983–1991)
- Frau Temme sucht das Glück (2017)
- Ghosts (German TV series) (2025)
- Großstadtrevier (1986–present)
- Heiter bis tödlich (multiple), light police comedy
- In aller Freundschaft (MDR), weekly soap (since 1998)
- In aller Freundschaft – Die jungen Ärzte (MDR), weekly soap (since 2015)
- Kir Royal (1986–1990)
- Lindenstraße (WDR), weekly soap (1985–2020)
- Magnum, P.I. (Magnum) (1984–1994)
- Miami Vice (1986–1994)
- Mord in bester Gesellschaft crime series (since 2007)
- Murder, She Wrote (Mord ist ihr Hobby) (1988)
- Polizeiruf 110 (multiple), crime drama
- Rentnercops (since 2015)
- Rote Rosen (Degeto Film), daily soap (since 2006)
- Sturm der Liebe (BR), daily soap (since 2005)
- Tatort (all regional stations)
- Türkisch für Anfänger (2006–2009)
- Um Himmels Willen (since 2002)
- Vorstadtweiber (2015–2016)
- Weissensee (2010, 2013, 2015)

=== Sport ===
- Sportschau (on Saturdays with Bundesliga, WDR) (1961–present)
- Sportschau vor acht (WDR) (2013–present)
- Sportschau-Club (WDR) (2012–present)
- FIFA World Cup (1954-present)
- UEFA European Championship (1960-present)

=== Talk ===
- Anne Will (NDR), hosted by Anne Will (2007–present)
- Beckmann (NDR), hosted by Reinhold Beckmann (1999–2014)
- Der internationale Frühschoppen (1953–1987)
- Günther Jauch (NDR), hosted by Günther Jauch (2011–2015)
- Hart aber fair (WDR), hosted by Frank Plasberg (2007–present)
- Maischberger (RBB/WDR), hosted by Sandra Maischberger (2003–present)
- Sabine Christiansen (NDR), hosted by Sabine Christiansen (1998–2007)

=== Former programmes ===
- Beat-Club
- Berlin, Berlin (SFB/RBB)
- Echo Music Prize (1998–2000, 2009–2016)
- Ein Herz und eine Seele (NDR)
- Die Kommissarin (1994–2006)
- Graf Yoster (1967–1976)
- Harald Schmidt (WDR)
- Marienhof (WDR), daily soap (1992–2009)
- Musikladen
- Polylux (ORB/RBB) (2000–2008)
- Raumpatrouille
- Verbotene Liebe (WDR), daily soap (1995–2015)
- Wochenspiegel (ARD-aktuell, NWDR/NDR) (1953–2014)
- Ziehung der Lottozahlen (HR), (1965–2013)

== Audience share ==
=== Germany ===
	January	February	March	April	May	June	July	August	September	October	November	December	Annual average
1990	-	-	-	-	-	-	-	-	-	-	-	-	30.8%
1991	-	-	-	-	-	-	-	-	-	-	-	-	▼24.5%
1992	-	-	-	-	-	-	-	-	-	-	-	-	▼22.0%
1993	-	-	-	-	-	-	-	-	-	-	-	-	▼17.0%
1994	-	-	-	-	-	-	-	-	-	-	-	-	▼16.3%
1995	-	-	-	-	-	-	-	-	-	-	-	-	▼14.6%
1996	14.8%	15.2%	14.4%	14.1%	13.6%	18.2%	15.8%	14.5%	14.5%	14.3%	13.9%	14.2%	▲14.8%
1997	14.3%	15.2%	13.3%	15.0%	13.7%	14.9%	15.0%	16.0%	15.6%	14.3%	14.6%	14.6%	▼14.7%
1998	14.8%	15.8%	14.8%	14.2%	15.1%	19.9%	18.1%	15.2%	14.8%	14.3%	14.1%	14.0%	▲15.4%
1999	14.8%	15.3%	14.8%	14.1%	13.7%	14.8%	14.5%	13.9%	13.7%	13.1%	13.4%	14.3%	▼14.2%
2000	14.4%	14.4%	14.1%	13.5%	14.3%	15.7%	15.1%	14.1%	15.9%	13.3%	13.7%	13.5%	▲14.3%
2001	12.9%	14.3%	13.3%	12.7%	13.2%	14.1%	14.7%	13.8%	14.8%	13.4%	13.7%	14.2%	▼13.7%
2002	13.6%	15.9%	13.7%	13.8%	13.6%	17.1%	13.9%	14.9%	13.8%	13.4%	13.5%	13.5%	▲14.2%
2003	14.0%	14.9%	14.2%	13.6%	13.2%	14.0%	14.8%	14.1%	14.6%	13.3%	13.7%	13.6%	▼14.0%
2004	13.1%	13.8%	13.7%	13.7%	13.8%	17.4%	13.3%	16.0%	12.6%	13.1%	13.8%	13.4%	▼13.9%
2005	13.2%	14.3%	13.4%	13.8%	12.3%	13.8%	13.5%	13.8%	13.3%	12.9%	13.2%	14.0%	▼13.5%
2006	13.9%	15.4%	13.7%	13.3%	13.6%	18.4%	14.2%	14.1%	13.7%	13.5%	13.5%	13.7%	▲14.2%
2007	13.8%	14.3%	13.9%	13.1%	13.0%	12.9%	12.2%	13.9%	13.4%	13.3%	13.4%	13.1%	▼13.4%
2008	13.6%	13.8%	12.5%	12.5%	12.9%	18.0%	12.6%	15.1%	12.7%	12.4%	12.6%	12.7%	13.4%
2009	12.5%	13.3%	13.1%	12.7%	12.5%	12.5%	12.0%	13.1%	12.6%	12.7%	12.8%	12.5%	▼12.7%
2010	13.4%	14.0%	12.8%	12.8%	12.9%	17.1%	14.0%	12.2%	12.5%	11.9%	12.2%	12.7%	▲13.2%
2011	12.5%	12.9%	13.2%	12.6%	12.8%	13.1%	12.1%	12.3%	11.8%	11.8%	11.6%	11.9%	▼12.4%
2012	12.9%	11.8%	12.2%	11.2%	11.2%	15.9%	11.4%	13.5%	11.5%	11.7%	11.7%	12.2%	▼12.3%
2013	12.2%	12.4%	12.5%	12.1%	11.7%	12.3%	11.7%	12.0%	12.0%	11.7%	11.7%	12.3%	▼12.1%
2014	11.7%	13.4%	12.3%	11.4%	12.0%	17.4%	15.0%	11.3%	11.3%	11.1%	11.8%	11.5%	▲12.5%
2015	11.3%	11.8%	11.6%	12.2%	11.8%	12.1%	10.9%	11.2%	10.9%	11.2%	11.9%	11.9%	▼11.6%
2016	12.2%	11.6%	11.3%	11.5%	12.1%	16.0%	13.1%	14.0%	11.0%	10.7%	11.2%	11.2%	▲12.1%
2017	10.6%	11.8%	12.0%	11.8%	11.4%	10.7%	10.7%	11.0%	11.2%	10.9%	11.3%	11.8%	▼11.3%
2018													

The average age of viewers was 61 in 2016.
