= Dieter Kronzucker =

German journalist and television presenter (born 1936)

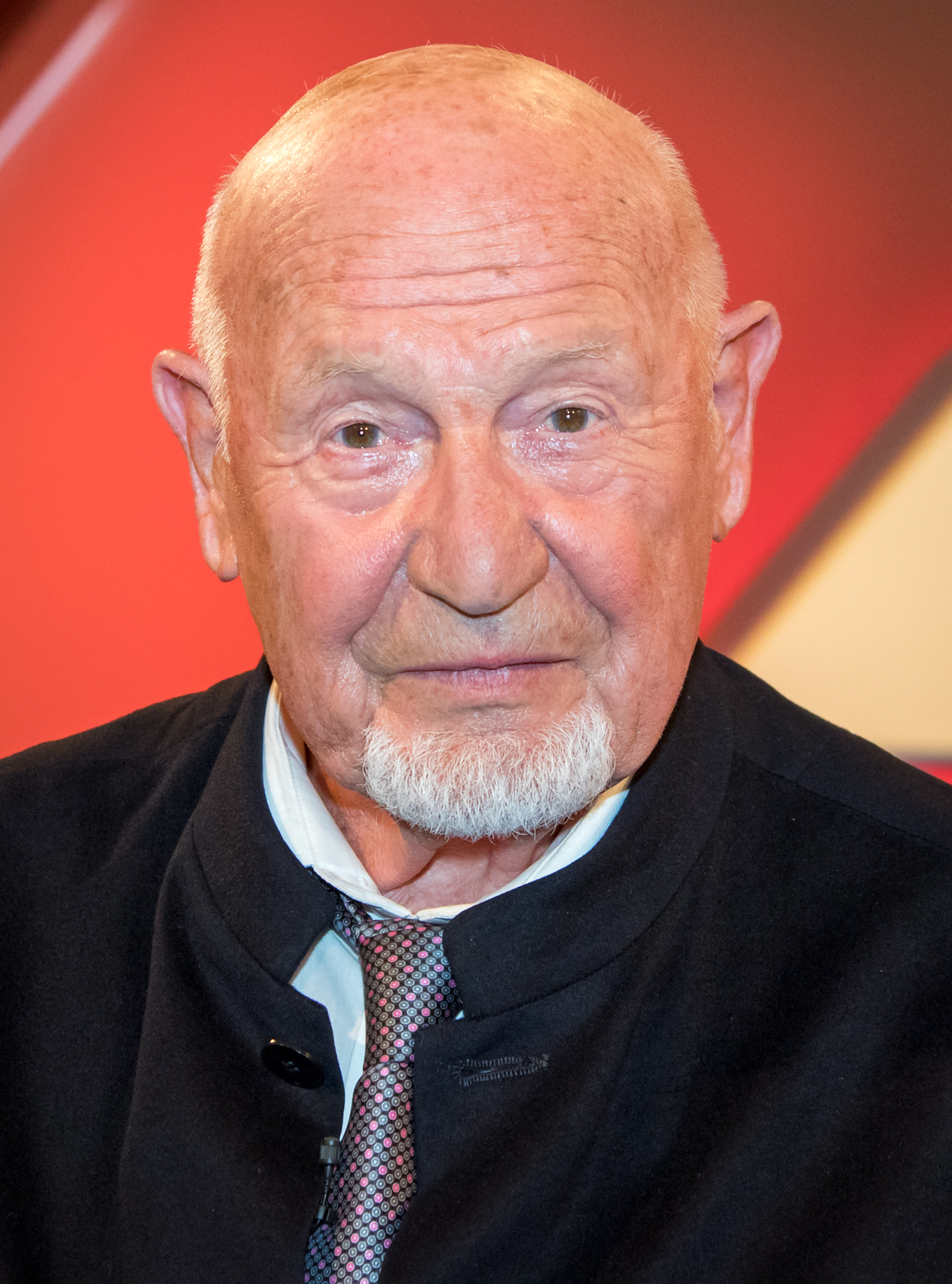
- Kronzucker in 2017
- Born: Hans-Dieter Kronzucker; 22 April 1936 (age 90); Munich, Germany
- Education: University of Vienna
- Occupations: Journalist, television presenter
- Children: 2, including Susanne Kronzucker

Hans-Dieter Kronzucker (born 22 April 1936) is a German journalist and television presenter.

== Life ==
Kronzucker was born in Munich, the son of an opera singer mother and a father who worked in the tourism industry. He grew up in Cologne and Tegernsee, Bavaria. He attended the Wittelsbacher-Gymnasium in Munich, graduating in 1954; during his time there, he founded and was the editor-in-chief of the school newspaper. He then studied philosophy and cultural history in Munich, Barcelona and Vienna, completing his PhD at the University of Vienna.

Kronzucker worked for many years as a journalist and television presenter in Germany, and is perhaps best known for presenting news magazine heute-journal, which he presented from 1978 until 1980, and again between 1986 and 1988. From 2001 to 2007, Kronzucker worked as professor at University of Television and Film Munich. Kronzucker lives in Berlin, Munich and Tegernsee.

In 1980, his two daughters, Sabine and Susanne, along with a nephew, were kidnapped while on holiday in Barberino Val d'Elsa, Tuscany. They were held captive for more than two months, being released after their families paid a ransom of 4.3 million Deutschmarks to the kidnappers. Susanne later went on to become a well-known journalist in her own right, for many years presenting news programme RTL aktuell, as deputy to anchor Peter Kloeppel.

== Awards ==
- 1985: Goldener Gong for Bilder aus Amerika, together with Hanns-Joachim Friedrichs
- 1988: Leo-M.-Goodman-Award
- 2002: Mitteldeutscher Medienpreis Hans Klein, lifetime achievement award
- 2007: Media award by the city of Munich
- 2008: Bayerischer Fernsehpreis
