= Jana Azizi =

German television presenter

- Azizi in 2026
- Born: March 1, 1989 (age 37); Kiev, Soviet Union
- Education: Mainz University of Applied Sciences
- Occupations: Television presenter, Model & Teacher
- Spouse: Johann Ackermann (2023-2025)

Jana Ackermann (born March 1, 1989, in Kiev, Ukrainian SSR, Soviet Union), known as Jana Azizi, is a German television presenter.

== Life and career ==
Azizi came to Germany from Ukraine in 1992 with her parents and older sister; she has Afghan roots. Azizi grew up in Mainz, where she graduated from high school in 2008. This was followed by vocational training as a marketing communications clerk in a Düsseldorf advertising agency until 2011. From 2011 to 2016 she completed a bachelor's degree in business administration at the Mainz University of Applied Sciences. During her studies she worked for the SWR in the sports department and also worked for them as a reporter. From 2016, she attended a moderator school. From March 2017 to January 2020, she moderated Sky Sport News, where she also worked in the editorial team. She also works as a plus-size model.

Azizi's move to RTL was announced in January 2020. There she occasionally moderated the sports news on RTL aktuell from March 2020 to 2021. In the same year, she moderated the former RTL morning magazine Guten Morgen Deutschland as a substitute and from 2020 to 2021 the RTL lunchtime journal Punkt 12.

In October 2020, Azizi succeeded Jennifer Knäble as presenter of the n-tv program Deluxe and has been presenting Extra – Das RTL-Magazin since January 2021. Since July 2021 she has been the main presenter of Explosiv - Das Magazin alongside Elena Bruhn and since August 2021 the presenter of the offshoot Explosiv Stories.

=== Personal life ===
Azizi trained as a yoga teacher in India in 2019 and has been leading yoga classes in Split, Croatia, since 2022.

She was in a relationship with the soccer coach Martin Schmidt until 2016. From August 2020 to August 2021, she was in a relationship with tennis player Andreas Mies. From September 2021 she has been in a relationship with the triathlete Johann Ackermann, whom she married in September 2023. They separated in March 2025. Azizi lived in Cologne from March 2020 until 2024, when she moved to Mallorca, Spain.

On September 25, 2022, Azizi competed in the IRONMAN 70.3 COZUMEL in Cozumel, Mexico, and finished the race in a total time of 6:17:22 h.

== Television appearances ==
Current moderations

- since 2020: Deluxe (n-tv)
- since 2021: Extra – The RTL Magazine (RTL, representation)
- since 2021: Explosiv – The Magazine / Explosiv Stories (RTL)

Former moderations

- 2017–2020: Sky Sport News (Sky)
- 2020: Good Morning Germany (RTL, representation)
- 2020–2021: Punkt 12 (RTL, representation)
- 2020–2021: RTL aktuell – Moderation Sport (RTL)

Guest appearances

- since 2020: Die 10 … / Die 25 … (RTL)
- since 2022: Der unfassbar schlauste Mensch der Welt (RTL)
