= Fanny Fee Werther =

German journalist (born 1994)

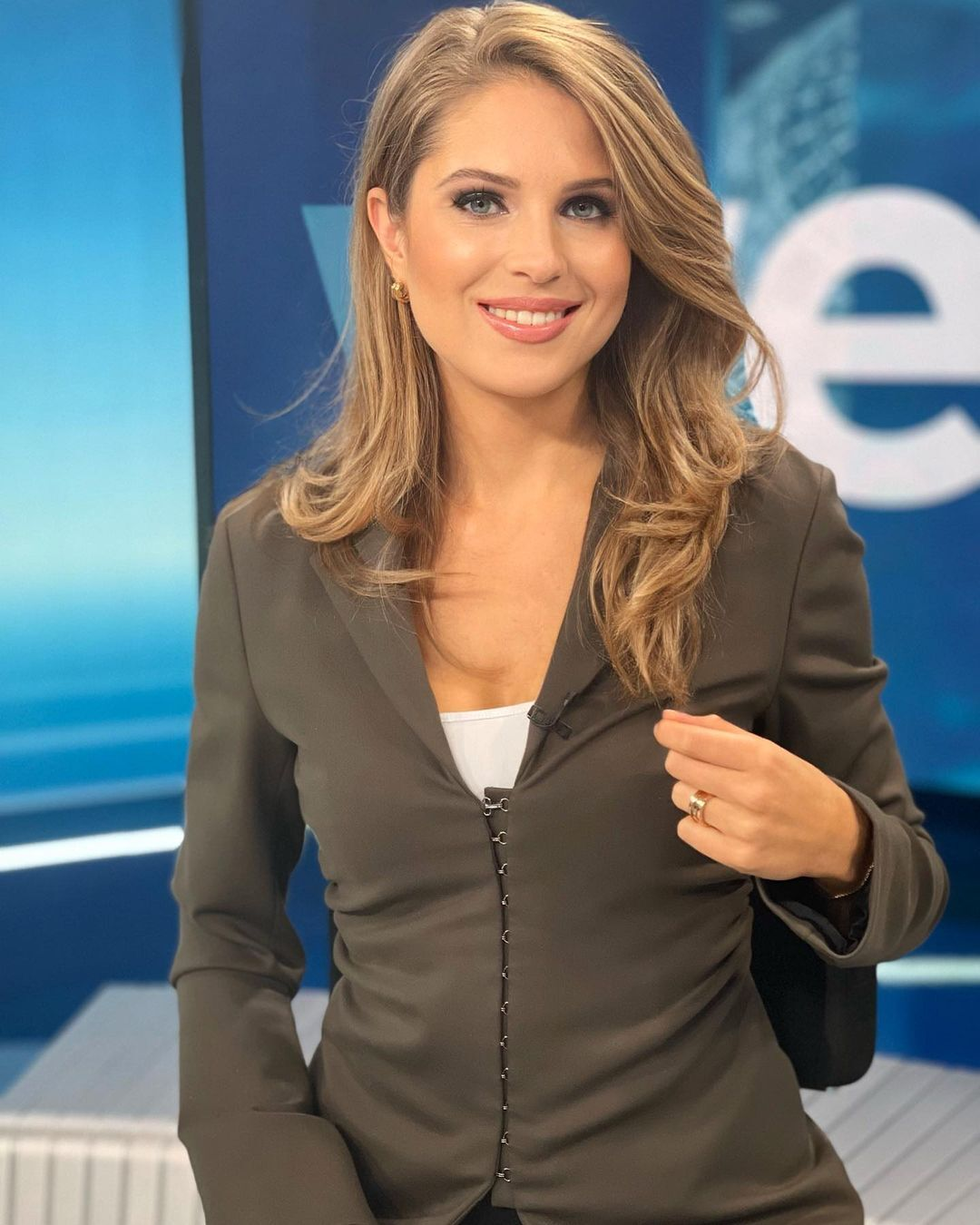
- Fanny Fee Werther
- Born: 6 February 1994 (age 32); Munich, Germany
- Citizenship: Germany
- Education: LMU Munich (Business administration)
- Occupations: Journalist; Television host
- Organizations: Welt (TV channel)

Fanny Fee Werther (born February 6, 1994, Munich) is a German journalist and TV host.

== Career ==
She was born and raised in Munich. Since 2012, she has studied at LMU Munich. In 2017, after graduating from university, she received a Bachelor's degree in Business administration. She began her journalistic career in 2012 as an intern for the German national television channels Sat.1, Sky Deutschland and Sport1. From 2017 to 2019, she completed an internship at the regional television channel Munich TV. There she worked as a reporter in the news department, presenting programs about sports competitions and events related to the Munich Oktoberfest. She was also a TV host of the programs Munich Today and Munich Evening 2. During her internship, she was trained as a video journalist.

In 2019, she began her career at the news channel Welt and moved from Munich to Berlin. Currently, she is serving as a television host, reporter and editor. She helped break major stories as a reporter for Welt participating in the news program and in special programs about political events, such as the 2021 German federal election, the election of Olaf Scholz as federal chancellor. She was a contributing reporter during the regional elections. Since 2020, Fanny Vie Werther has been serving as a moderator. She hosts the morning news on the Welt with her colleague Carsten Hedler. Since November 2023, she has been hosting the evening news program with her colleague Alexander Simon.
