= Welt (TV channel) =

German television channel

- Country: Germany
- Broadcast area: Germany; Austria; Switzerland
- Headquarters: Berlin, Germany

Programming
- Picture format: 1080i HDTV (downscaled to 16:9 576i for the SDTV feed)

Ownership
- Owner: WeltN24 GmbH (Axel Springer SE)
- Sister channels: N24 Doku

History
- Launched: 24 January 2000
- Former names: N24 (2000–2018)

Links
- Website: welt.de

Availability

Terrestrial
- Digital terrestrial television: Channel slots vary depending on location (HD)

Streaming media
- n24.de: welt.de (Germany only)

Logo until 17 January 2018

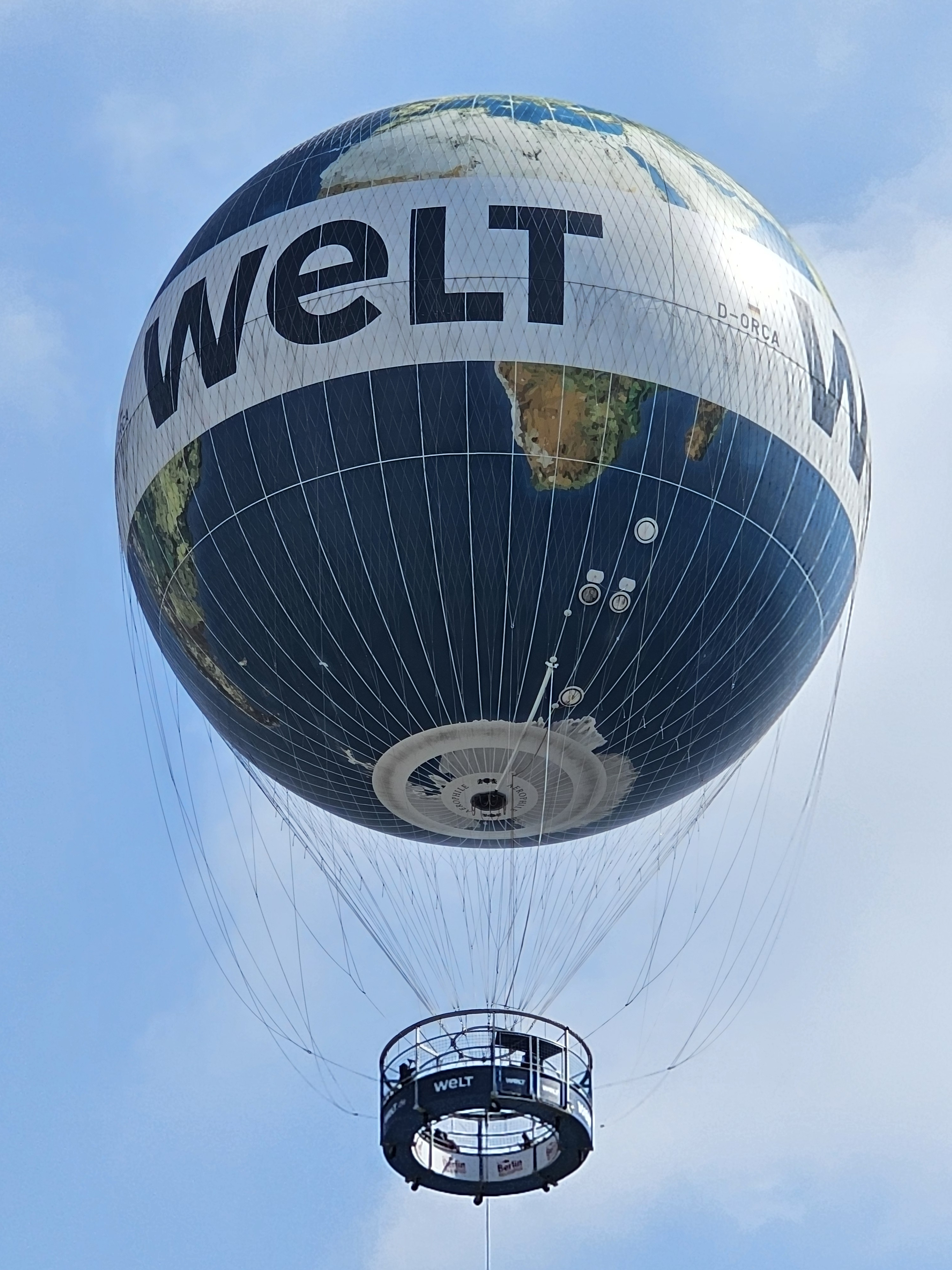
Current logo on a tethered balloon over Berlin, 2026

Welt ([vɛlt], "World") (known as N24 from its launch in 2000 to 2018) is a German free-to-air television news channel owned by WeltN24 GmbH, itself a subsidiary of Axel Springer SE.

On 21 September 2017, WeltN24 announced that N24 would become Welt on 18 January 2018. WeltN24 also publishes Die Welt, a conservative-leaning newspaper.

== History ==
In the late 1990s, in the heat of the dot-com bubble ProSieben Media Group, then consisting of two TV channels (ProSieben and Kabel 1) whose programming largely consisted of US movies, sitcoms and series, tried to take over German television news channel n-tv, then owned by Handelsblatt and CNN. After the attempt failed, ProSieben Media purchased German newswire ddp (which later became dapd) and announced the launch of its own news channel soon afterwards, by consolidating ProSieben's news department. The channel was launched on 24 January 2000 at noon, from ProSieben Media's headquarters in Unterföhring near Munich. In collaboration with Bloomberg Television, N24 provided live coverage of financial markets around the world. Apart from running its own network, Welt also provided ProSieben and Kabel 1 with newscasts.

In the same year, ProSieben Media AG purchased rival channel Sat.1, located in Berlin, which had a news department of its own and ran a number of factual programmes. ProSieben Media AG renamed itself ProSiebenSat.1 Media AG. After the merger, N24 moved from Unterföhring to Sat.1's headquarters in Berlin in July 2001, and the news departments of Sat.1 and N24 were combined.

In 2002, ProSiebenSat.1's majority owner, KirchMedia, filed for bankruptcy. While ProSiebenSat.1 itself was not broke, an extended search for a buyer, during which ProSiebenSat.1 was effectively owned by KirchMedia's banks, created uncertainty at the company. This combined with the market crisis after the end of the dotcom bubble and 9/11, caused ProSiebenSat.1 to cut costs. It replaced a number of newscasts on N24, especially in the afternoons, the evenings and on the weekends, with cheaper documentaries. Business and stock market coverage was also cut dramatically, and remaining business reports were bought from CNBC Europe instead of producing them in-house. The reports featured CNBC's proprietary graphics. In 2007, N24 strengthened its business coverage, introducing daily programmes such as Börse am Mittag ["Stock Market Afternoon"] and Börse am Abend ["Stock Market Evening"]. The channel moved its headquarters in October 2008.

In 2008, ProSiebenSat.1 sold its property in Berlin and announced that Sat.1 would move to Unterföhring, where ProSieben and Kabel 1 were already based. N24 would relocate within Berlin. In 2010, ProSiebenSat.1 sold N24 to a group of private investors, led by former Der Spiegel editor Stefan Aust. N24 was contracted by ProSiebenSat.1 to continue providing Sat.1, ProSieben and Kabel 1 with newscasts at least until 2016. In 2013, N24 was acquired by Axel Springer SE and combined with Die Welt to form WeltN24.

On 17 September 2016, a sister channel called N24 Doku launched free to air, which is a one-hour delayed timeshift channel of Welt in the afternoon and replaces some news broadcasts by documentaries in the morning.

In early 2024, following the loss of contracts to supply Pro7Sat1 properties with news and the closure of Bild TV, changes were made to the programming lineup. These included less news at weekends and more sport.

== Programming ==
Welt runs news on the hour, every hour.

Welt previously broadcast a variety of programming, with more than seven hours of live programming per business day. CNBC correspondents Silvia Wadhwa, Patricia Szarvas, Roland Klaus, Michael Mross and Bruni Schubert reported live from the Frankfurt Stock Exchange, the LSE and the NYSE throughout the day.

== Anchors and reporters ==
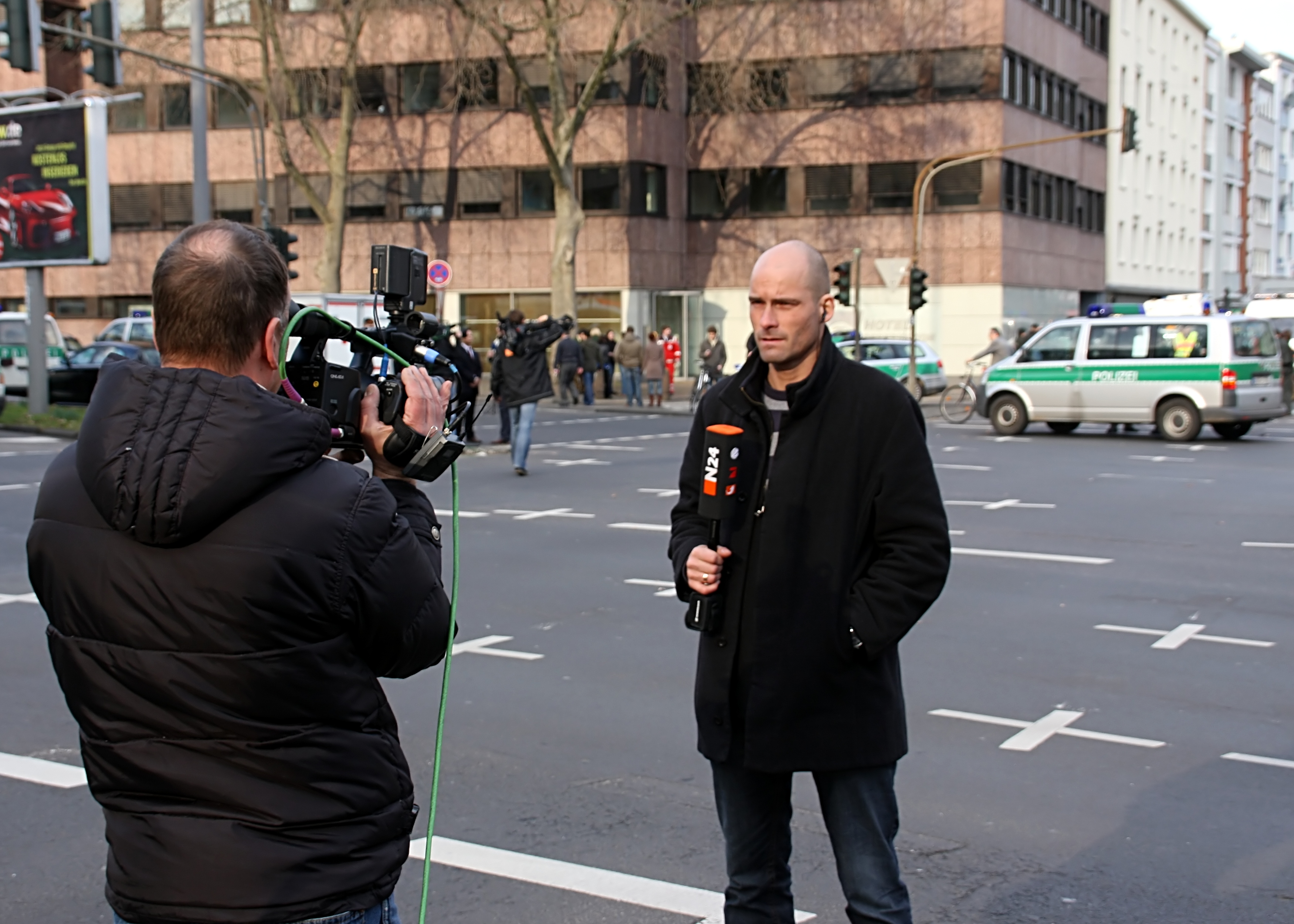
N24 reporter Steffen Schwarzkopf in Cologne, reporting about the collapse of the Historical Archive of the City of Cologne

- Fanny Fee Werther
- Pia Ampaw
- Robert Annetzberger
- Dietmar Deffner
- Marc Dickgreber
- Ralf Finke
- Michel Friedman
- Astrid Frohloff
- Petra Glinski
- Ilka Groenewold
- Hans-Hermann Gockel
- Carsten Hädler
- Hans-Peter Hagemes
- Alexandra Karle
- Andrea Kempter
- Thomas Klug
- Dieter Kronzucker
- Peter Limbourg (chief editor)
- Michaela Mey
- Wenzel Michalski
- Tatjana Ohm
- Florian Otto
- Gaby Papenburg
- Petra Papke
- Inge Posmyk
- Milena Preradovic
- Alexander Privitera
- Christina Prüver
- Julia Scherf
- Katrin Sandmann
- Sandra Schiffauer
- Hajo Schumacher
- Thomas Schwarzer
- Steffen Schwarzkopf
- Alexander Simon
- Thomas Spahn
- Stephan Strothe
- Claus Strunz
- Bruder Paulus Terwitte
- Hans-Hermann Tiedje
- Marcus Tychsen
- Claudia von Brauchitsch
- Alexander von Roon
- Verena Wriedt

== Programming ==
=== Talk ===
- Studio Friedman, hosted by Michel Friedman (2004–present)

== N24 Doku ==
N24 Doku
- Country: Germany
- Broadcast area: Germany
- Headquarters: Berlin, Germany

Programming
- Picture format: 1080i HDTV (downscaled to 16:9 576i for the SDTV feed)

Ownership
- Owner: WeltN24 GmbH (Axel Springer SE)
- Sister channels: Welt

History
- Launched: 17 September 2016

Availability

Streaming media
- n24.de: welt.de

On 9 June 2016, WeltN24 announced the launch of N24 Doku as the timeshift channel of N24 in the autumn of 2016. On 20 July 2016, it was announced that the broadcaster would start on 17 September 2016.

== Austrian feed ==
On 27 April 2012 the SES Astra satellite platform has been showing an Austrian subfeed of N24 (transponder 3, 11,244 GHz horizontal, SR 22,000, FEC 5/6). Nothing has been reported to the press about the launch of the station. A few days later, the transmitter was switched off again. On 16 July 2012 the broadcasting code N24 HD Austria was launched. On 2 April 2016, N24 Austria started its broadcast via Astra 1N. On 18 January 2018 N24 Austria was replaced by N24 Doku Austria. On 1 February 2021, the Austrian feed was discontinued.

== Logos ==
2000–2003

2003–2016

HD logo used until 2016

2016–2018

HD logo (2016–2018)

2018–present

HD logo (2018–present)
