= Miriam Meckel =

German journalist and professor

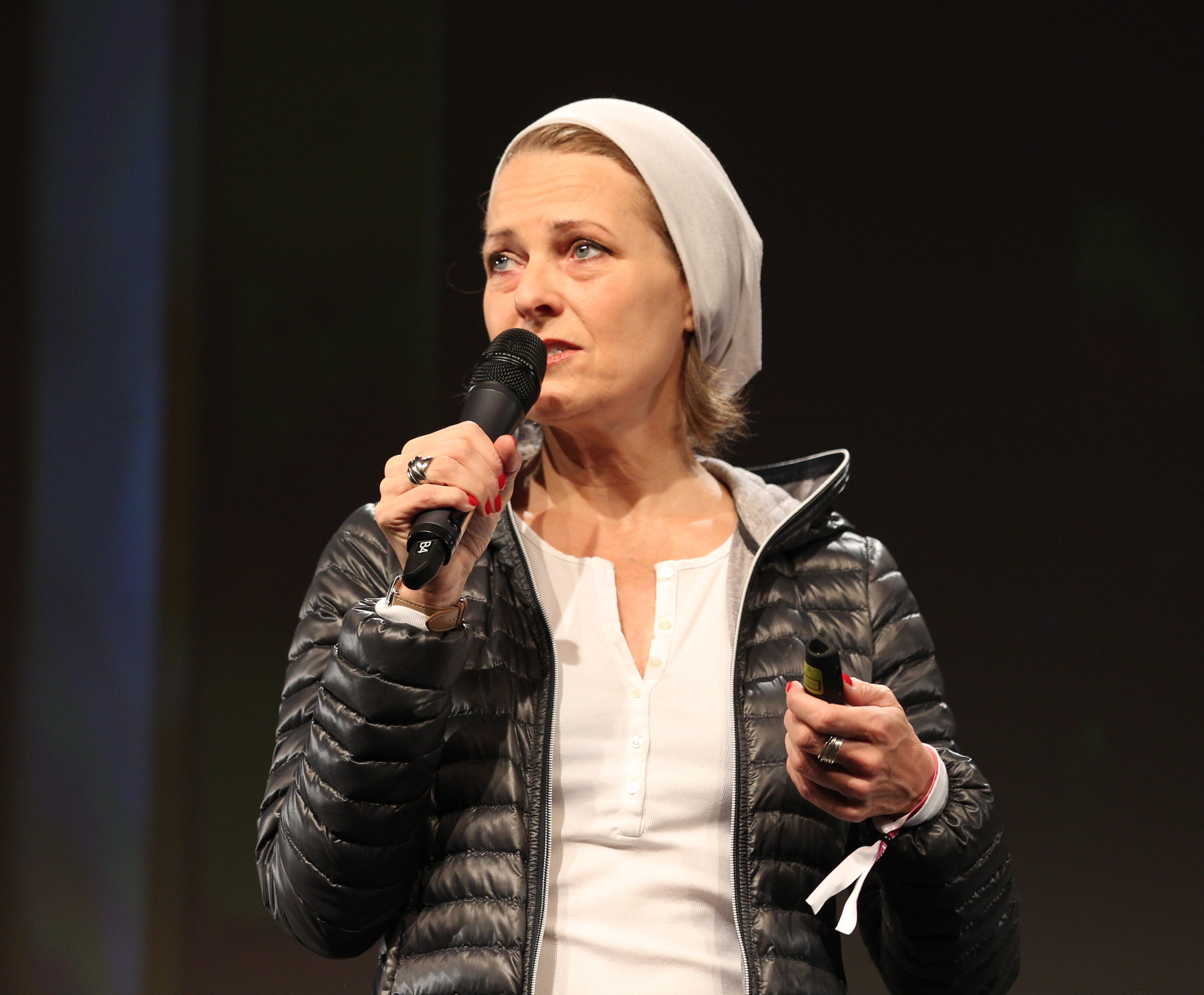
- Meckel in 2017
- Born: 18 July 1967 (age 59); Hilden, West Germany
- Education: University of Münster (Ph.D., 1995)
- Occupations: Journalist and Professor for Corporate Communication and Director of the Institute for Media and Communication Management at the University of St. Gallen in Switzerland
- Spouse: Anne Will (m. 2016; sep. 2019)
- Website: www.miriammeckel.com

Miriam Meckel (born 18 July 1967) is a German journalist and professor for Corporate Communication, editor and publisher of the German magazine Wirtschaftswoche and Director of the Institute for Media and Communication Management at the University of St. Gallen in Switzerland.

In 2020, Meckel co-founded ada Learning GmbH together with Léa Steinacker, Verena Pausder and the Handelsblatt Media Group, with Meckel assuming the role of Chief Executive Officer and later Executive Chairwoman.

In November 2014, Meckel was appointed editor-in-chief of Germany's leading business weekly Wirtschaftswoche, as the first woman to hold that position. In April 2017, she became the publisher of the magazine.

From 2001 to 2005, Meckel served as the State Secretary at the department of the Premier of the German State of North Rhine-Westphalia and government spokeswoman, and later the State Secretary for Europe, International Affairs and Media. From 1999 to 2001, she was a professor of communication sciences at the University of Münster in Germany. Her publications include texts on media economics, communication, and cyberpolitics; in 2010, she wrote about her experience with burn-out syndrome. Her book became the basis for an award-winning television movie in 2016.

As a member of the international jury for the Development Gateway Foundation of the World Bank, Meckel was instrumental in designing the Development Gateway Award (Petersberg Prize).

== Honors and awards ==
- 2001: Cicero Speaker Award in the Science category
- 2020: Order of Merit of the State of North Rhine-Westphalia
- 2021: Ernst Schneider Prize (a German Business Journalism Award)
- 2025: Rudolf Diesel Medal (Europe's oldest innovation award) in the category “Best Media Communication”

== Publications (extract) ==
- 1994: Fernsehen ohne Grenzen? Europas Fernsehen zwischen Integration und Segmentierung
- 1996: Internationale Kommunikation - eine Einführung
- 1998: Fernsehnachrichten. Strukturen, Funktionen, Prozesse
- 1999: Redaktionsmanagement. Ansätze aus Theorie und Praxis
- 1999: with Klaus Kamps, Patrick Rössler and Werner Gephart: Medien-Mythos? Die Inszenierung von Prominenz und Schicksal am Beispiel von Diana Spencer
- 2000: with Marianne Ravenstein: Cyberworlds. Computerwelten der Zukunft
- 2001: Die globale @genda. Kommunikation und Globalisierung
- 2005: Cyberpolitics and Cyberpolity, Zur Virtualisierung politischer Kommunikation
- 2007: Das Glück der Unerreichbarkeit, Wege aus der Kommunikationsfalle
- 2010: Brief an mein Leben: Erfahrungen mit einem Burnout
- 2011: 'NEXT - Erinnerungen an eine Zukunft ohne uns'

== Personal ==
Meckel lives in Germany and Switzerland. She was married to Anne Will, a German television journalist from 2016 to 2019.
