= Anne Will (talk show) =

German political talk show

- Current logo
- Genre: Talk show
- Presented by: Anne Will
- Country of origin: Germany
- Original language: German

Production
- Running time: 60 minutes

Original release
- Release: 16 September 2007 – 3 December 2023

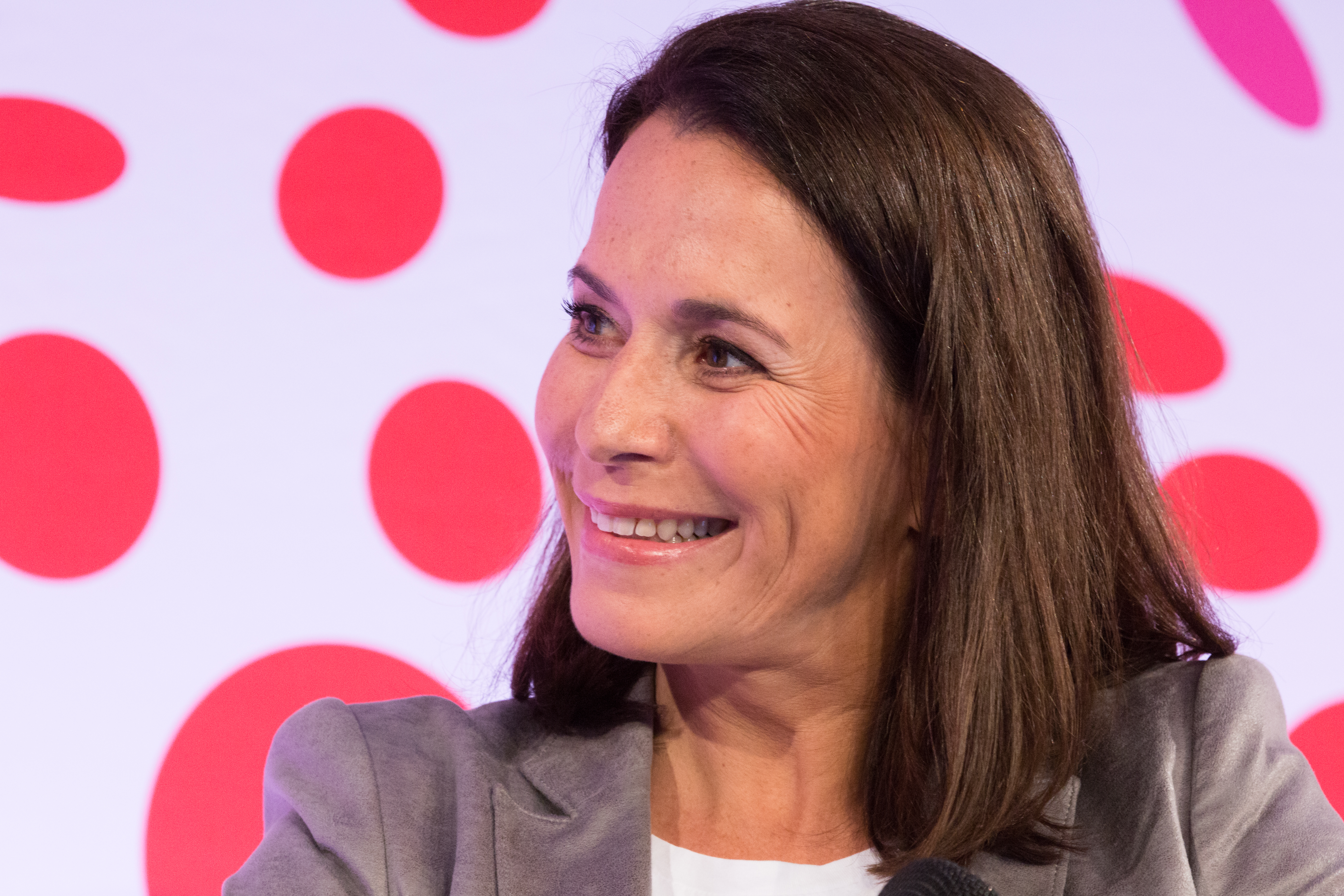
Moderator Anne Will in 2018

Anne Will was a German political talk show on Das Erste with the slogan "Politisch denken, persönlich fragen" ("Think political, ask personal"). It is named after the moderator Anne Will.

== History ==
Old logo

The show Anne Will replaced Sabine Christiansen. Günther Jauch, originally planned for Christiansen's successor, canceled after several months of negotiations because he was unable to meet ARD's demand for journalistic exclusivity. The directors of the state broadcasting corporations then agreed to make the broadcasting slot available to Anne Will. The first show with her was broadcast on 16 September 2007.

On the show, Will interviewed Chancellor Angela Merkel in September 2009 (shortly before the 2009 election), in October 2015, in February 2016, November 2016 and in June 2018 (following the 44th G7 summit). Among the international dignitaries who have appeared on the show were the foreign ministers of Austria and Luxembourg, Sebastian Kurz (2016) and Jean Asselborn (2014, 2015 and 2018).

== Audience share ==
From 2016, Anne Will was the most watched talk show on the German television. While in 2015, each program was seen by an average of 1.5 million viewers, it reached an average of 4 million in 2016 after a change of the channel place. In 2017 and 2018, the show reached an average of 4.1 and 3.4 million viewers. Amid the COVID-19 pandemic in Germany, the show reached a new record when the audience share was at an average of 15.2 percent in 2021, making it the most-watched talk show in German-language television.

== Reception ==
The show was criticized for an unbalanced treatment of topics. According to a 2020 study, topics like science, culture, education, social things and religion rarely have their say.

== Awards ==
- 2019: Die Goldene Kartoffel (negative price) for its content
