= Bärbel Schäfer =

German television presenter and talk show host

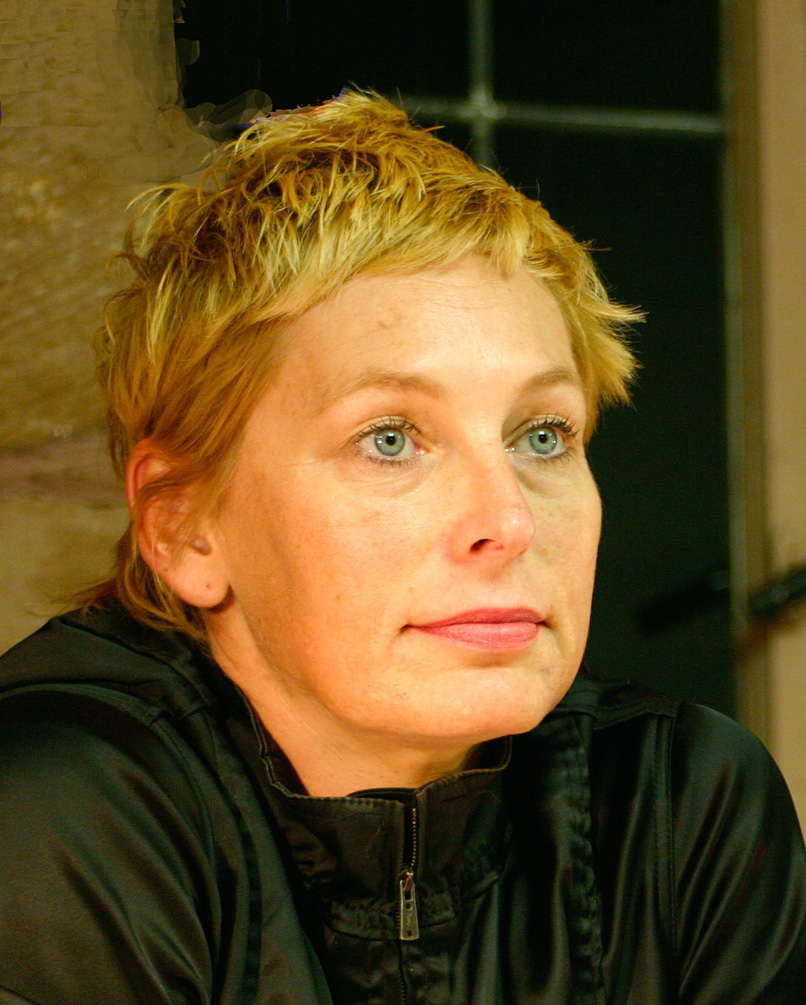
- Schäfer, 2006
- Born: 16 December 1963 (age 62); Bremen, West Germany
- Occupations: Television presenter, talk show host
- Years active: 1995–present

Bärbel Schäfer (born 16 December 1963) is a German television presenter and talk show host.

== Life ==
Schäfer works in Germany as television presenter and talk show host. In 2004 Schäfer married Michel Friedman in Eschborn, only shortly after Friedman was convicted in a case involving forced prostitution and drug usage. In her 2005 novel "Wer, wenn nicht er?" (Who if not he?) she loosely reflects on her mixed emotions concerning her marriage with Friedman the previous year.

== Works ==
- together with Susanne Luerweg: Wer, wenn nicht er? Roman, 2005, ISBN 3-453-29007-0
- together with Monika Schuck: Ich wollte mein Leben zurück. Rütten & Loening, 2006, ISBN 3-352-00658-X
- together with Susanne Luerweg: Schaumküsse. Diana Verlag, 2007, ISBN 978-3-453-29022-8
- together with Monika Schuck: Die besten Jahre: Frauen erzählen vom Älterwerden. Kiepenheuer Verlag, 2008 ISBN 3-378-01091-6
- together with Monika Schuck: Das Glücksgeheimnis: Paare erzählen vom Gelingen ihrer Liebe. Kiepenheuer Verlag, 2009 ISBN 3-378-01102-5

== Awards ==
- Goldene Kamera for talk show Bärbel Schäfer
