= Anna Fleischhauer =

German journalist

- Born: 16 April 1987 (age 39); Düsseldorf, Germany
- Occupations: Journalist, television presenter
- Television: WDR Fernsehen (2017–2021); RTL aktuell (2021–present)

Anna Fleischhauer (born 16 April 1987) is a German journalist and television presenter.

== Life and career ==
Anna Fleischhauer grew up with her twin sister Marie, who is also a journalist and with whom she also appeared in the Ratiopharm advertisement in Neuss. In 2006, she ended high school in the same town graduating with her Abitur. She then studied communication sciences and psychology at the University of Bonn until 2009. She then started working at NRWision in 2010 and 2011. From 2010 to 2012, she completed a master's degree in sports, media, and communication research at the German Sport University Cologne. Between 2013 and 2015, she completed an internship at the RTL School of Journalism for TV and Multimedia. She also worked for ZDF in London and WDR in Bonn. Since then, Fleischhauer has worked as a freelance journalist for RTL Sport, WDR, DFL and DTM. Between 2015 and 2020, she reported from the Formula 1 racetrack for RTL. From 2017 to 2021, she hosted the WDR Fernsehen Lokalzeit Ruhr. Since 2021, she has been a presenter for RTL aktuell in the afternoon, reporting on sports in the early evening.
