= Roberta Bieling =

German television presenter and journalist

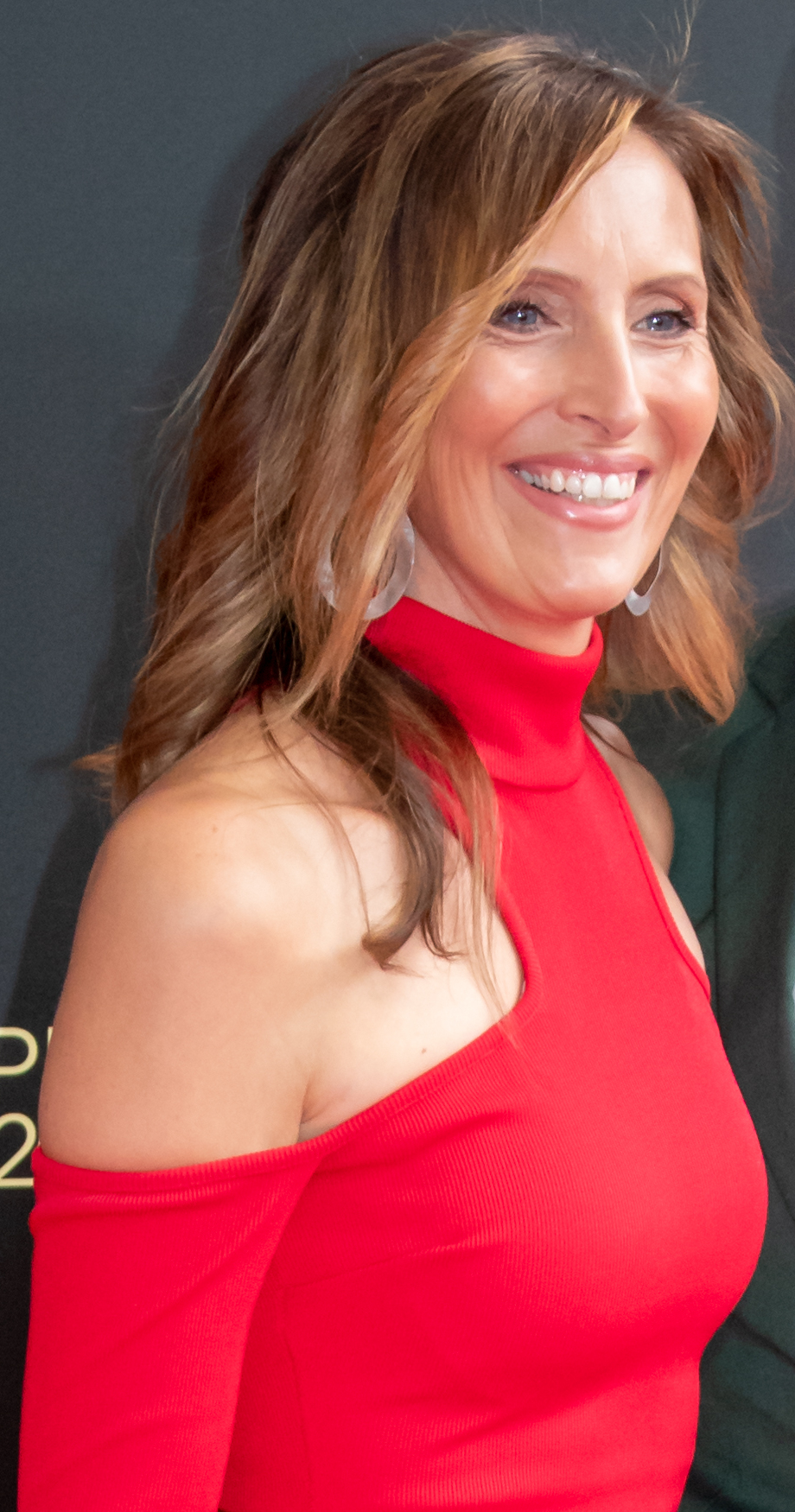
Bieling in 2021

Roberta Bieling (born February 27, 1975, in Bochum) is a German journalist and television presenter for the broadcaster RTL.

== Life and career ==
From 1995 to 1997, she studied theater, film and television at the Ruhr University in Bochum. She then did a traineeship at the television production company TeutoTele/CNC. She then worked as a police and court reporter and created lifestyle articles for the RTL lunchtime journal Punkt 12.

In the spring of 2000, Bieling moved to RTL in Cologne, where she moderated RTL II News, of which she was the anchorwoman from 2003. From 2000 to 2013, alongside Wolfram Kons, she was the main presenter, editor and reporter of the RTL morning magazines Punkt 6 and Punkt 9, and from 2013 to 2015 in their successor format Guten Morgen Deutschland.

Since 2006, she has been part of the moderation team of Punkt 12, and since 2010 she has moderated the lunchtime magazine, usually one week a month. In December 2015, Bieling moved from the morning magazine to Punkt 12 to take on the position of CvD in addition to her moderation work.

From March to June 2022, she moderated the RTL morning magazines Punkt 6, Punkt 7 and Punkt 8 on a stand-in basis. Since January 2023, Bieling has been moderating RTL aktuell.

== Personal life ==
Bieling is married to former RTL editor-in-chief Martin Gradl, who became co-managing director of RTL News GmbH in March 2023, and is the mother of three daughters.
