= Michel Friedman =

German politician and talk show host

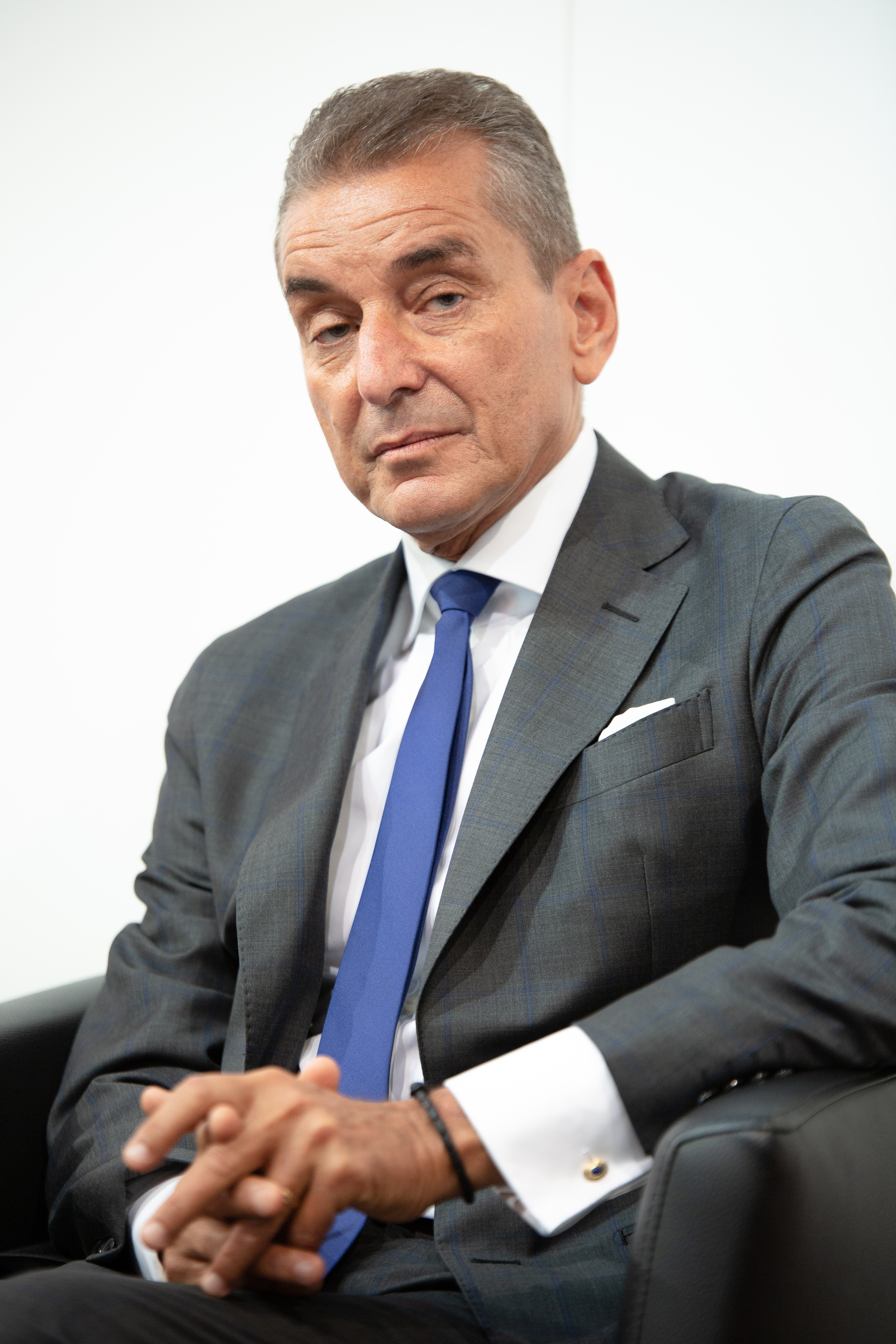
Friedman at the Frankfurt Book Fair 2018

Julien Michel Friedman (German: [miˈʃɛl ˈfʁiːtman]; born 25 February 1956) is a German author, former CDU politician, and talk show host. From 2000 to 2003, Friedman was vice president of the Central Council of Jews in Germany, and president of the European Jewish Congress from 2001 to 2003, when he resigned after being convicted in a case involving forced prostitution and cocaine usage. From 1998 to 2003, he had his own show on German television. Since 2004, he has been hosting a weekly talk show on N24 called Studio Friedman. Friedman is a lawyer by profession, and studied law and philosophy.

== Early life and education ==
Friedman was born to a Polish-Jewish family. His parents and his grandmother were Schindlerjuden, i.e. Oskar Schindler had recruited them for slave labor, thereby rescuing them from a concentration camp. They had been in the most infamous of all camps, the extermination camp Auschwitz-Birkenau. After the Second World War, his family opened a fur shop in Paris. In 1965, the family went to Germany and settled in Frankfurt am Main.

Friedman began studying medicine, but then switched to law. He graduated from law school in 1988 and became a doctor of law in 1994. He has a brother living in Israel.

== Career ==
After qualifying as a lawyer in 1988, Friedman became a partner in an international law firm specializing in financial and media matters. Today, he is a professor of real estate and media law.

From 2000 until 2003, Friedman served as President of the European Jewish Congress (EJC).

Friedman's career in TV began with a talk show called Vorsicht! Friedman (Caution! Friedman) on the public broadcaster Hessischer Rundfunk in 1998. Since 2004, he has been presenting "Studio Friedman" on Germany's Welt channel. His talk show Auf ein Wort premiered on Deutsche Welle in 2017.

In January 2025, Friedman had told Tagesspiegel of his shock and criticised Elon Musk's salute shameful, noting, "the breaking of taboos is reaching a point that is dangerous for the entire free world. The brutalisation, the dehumanisation, Auschwitz, all of that is Hitler".

Friedman announced he would be leaving the CDU in January 2025, following the party's collaboration with the far-right AfD in attempting to pass a controversial immigration bill.

=== 2016 Turkey interview scandal ===
When Friedman interviewed Turkish Youth and Sports Minister Akif Çağatay Kılıç in 2016 about the Turkish coup d'état attempt against the Erdoğan regime, the mass layoffs and arrests that followed the failed putsch, the media situation and the position of women in Turkey, the Turkish government confiscated the recordings. In response, Deutsche Welle Director-General Peter Limbourg condemned Turkey for the seizure of the video tape as "a blatant violation of press freedom."

== Other activities ==
- Wall GmbH, Member of the supervisory board (since 2003)
- Atlantik-Brücke, Member
- Federal Academy for Security Policy (BAKS), Member of the Advisory Board
- ZDF, Member of the Broadcasting Council (1990–2003)

== Recognition ==
- 2001 – Order of Merit of the Federal Republic of Germany
- 2001 – German Television Award

== Controversy ==
In 2003, Friedman was convicted in a case involving prostitution and drug usage. Friedman had been accused of offering cocaine to Ukrainian prostitutes he had ordered through an escort service that was being investigated for forced prostitution. Friedman's crime was discovered almost by chance, when police wiretaps for the investigation into forced prostitution led them to the name "Paolo Pinkel", which turned out to be Friedman's alias when using the service. However several Jewish leaders claimed Friedman's arrest was part of an anti-Semitic witch-hunt. Investigators raided his home and found small quantities of cocaine. He was fined €17,400 for possession of cocaine, on 8 July 2003. The settlement enabled him to avoid a trial. After publicly admitting to the drug possession Friedman stated "I have made a mistake. Drugs are no help. I am resigning from all public offices that I hold." As well as resigning from the Central Council of Jews Friedman also resigned from the Christian Democratic Union.

However, since he did not apologise to the forced prostitutes themselves (keeping silent about the nature of his "mistake"), the German women's rights organisation Terre des Femmes and others strongly criticised Friedman's speech.

== Personal life ==
Since July 2004 Friedmann has been married to Bärbel Schäfer, a former German TV celebrity. They got married at Park East Synagogue. The couple has two sons, Samuel (*2005) and Oscar (*2008 – named after Oskar Schindler).
