= Hanns Joachim Friedrichs =

German journalist

- Born: 15 March 1927; Hamm, Weimar Republic
- Died: 28 March 1995 (aged 68); Hamburg, Germany
- Other name: Hanns Joachim Friedrichs
- Occupation: Journalist

Hanns Joachim "Hajo" Friedrichs (15 March 1927 – 28 March 1995) was a German journalist.

== Life ==
Friedrichs was born in Hamm. From 1971 to 1981, he was a sports journalist for the German magazine, Sportstudio. 1985 Friedrichs went from ZDF to ARD. In Germany, Friedrichs became famous as the anchorman for the television news program Tagesthemen, which he moderated alternately with Ulrike Wolf (*1944) and later Sabine Christiansen. He was succeeded by Ulrich Wickert. Friedrichs died in March 1995, from lung cancer. The Hanns-Joachim-Friedrichs-Award for works in journalism is named after him.

On 9 November 1989, he announced to the German public that the Berlin Wall had fallen. He died in Hamburg.

== Awards ==
- Goldener Gong for Bilder aus Amerika, together with Dieter Kronzucker
