= Sabine Christiansen (talk show) =

German political talk show

- Presented by: Sabine Christiansen
- Country of origin: Germany
- Original language: German
- No. of episodes: 447

Production
- Producers: Norddeutscher Rundfunk, TV21 GmbH
- Production location: Berlin
- Running time: 60 min

Original release
- Release: 4 January 1998 – 24 June 2007

Sabine Christiansen was a political talk show on the German television channel Das Erste. The hostess was Sabine Christiansen herself.

The program was broadcast on Sunday, 4 January 1998 for the first time and ran until 24 June 2007 at 21:45 on Sundays. From 1 September 2002 the show was produced by Sabine Christiansen's company TV21 GmbH. A total of 447 episodes were produced. The format developed into the best-known talk show on German television. The annual costs for ARD were around ten million euros, which corresponds to around 200,000 euros per consignment.

It was replaced by Anne Will.

== Concept ==
During the one-hour program, guests from politics and business expressed their opinions on the current topic of the program. The weekly topics were essentially oriented to the current political debate in the media and were usually dressed in the form of a question. Speeches by individual guests as well as argumentative discussions in the discussion rounds were repeatedly taken up by numerous media in German-speaking countries after the individual broadcasts. Sabine Christiansen was ascribed greater influence in the media than some members of parliament, at the same time her program was partly named as representative of the increasing tabloidisation of reporting.

Within the ARD, the program was assigned to the entertainment department instead of the ARD coordination responsible for politics. In the course of the discussion on the succession of moderators in January 2007, the then SWR director Peter Voß criticised this with the words: I have always thought it senseless to include 'Sabine Christiansen' in the entertainment. The program was thus removed from the professional criticism of the ARD editors-in-chief.

== Location ==
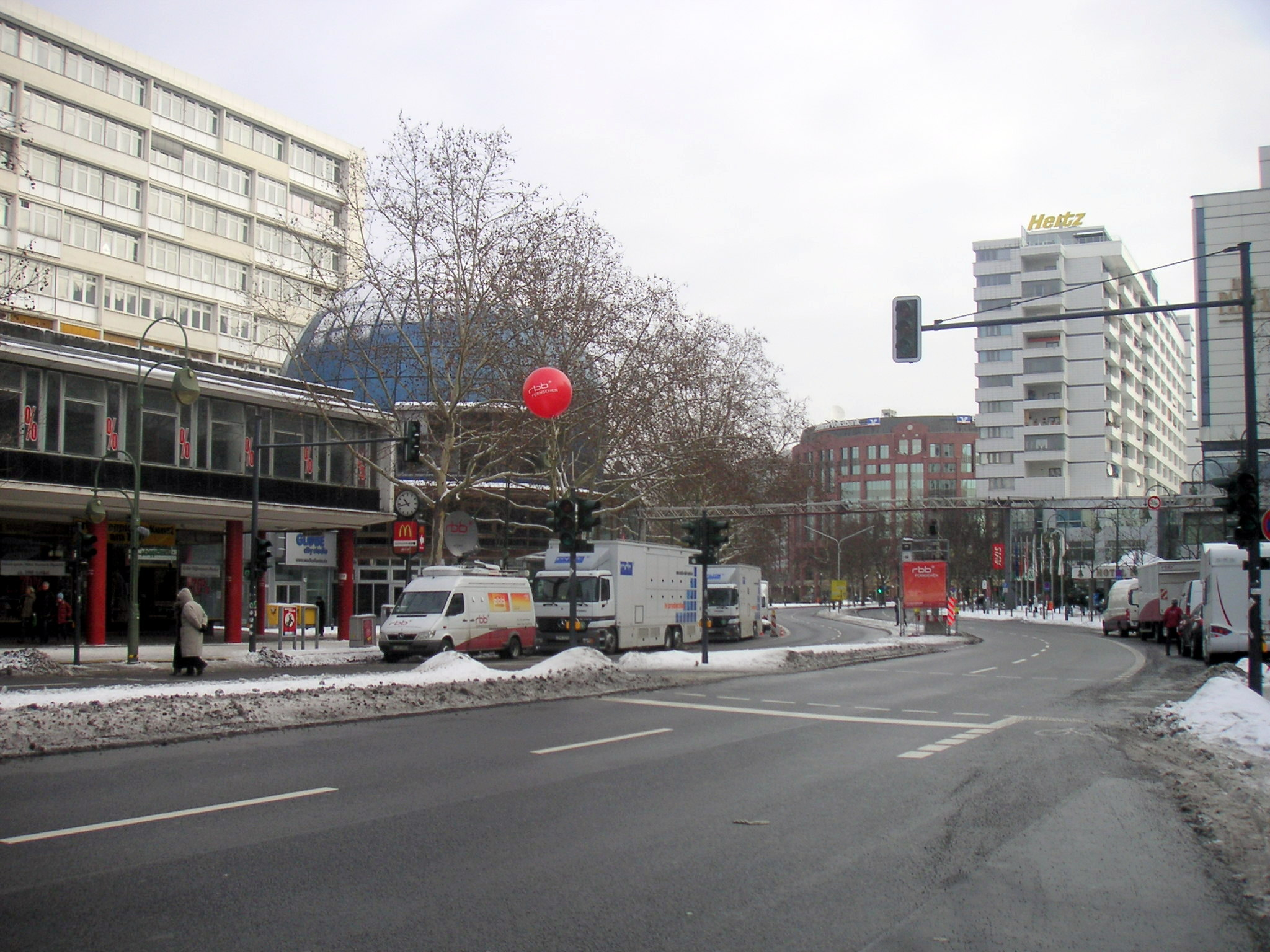
Blue sphere at Budapester Straße and Breitscheidplatz where the show was produced

Sabine Christiansen was broadcast from the Globe City Studio, a blue sphere near the Kaiser Wilhelm Memorial Church in Berlin. It was built in 1988 as a 360-degree cinema, later then served as a badly slandered disco and was converted into a television studio in 1997. On a floor space of approx. 280 square metres, 95 viewers were able to follow the programme. In the Globe City Studio, individual programmes of hart aber fair were also produced.

== Hosts ==
- Sabine Christiansen (1998–2007)
