= Sportschau =

German sports news television series

- Theme music composer: Werner Müller
- Opening theme: Topsy
- Countries of origin: West Germany (1961–1990); Germany (1990–present)
- Original language: German

Production
- Producer: WDR
- Production location: Cologne
- Running time: 105 minutes

Original release
- Network: Das Erste
- Release: 4 June 1961 – present

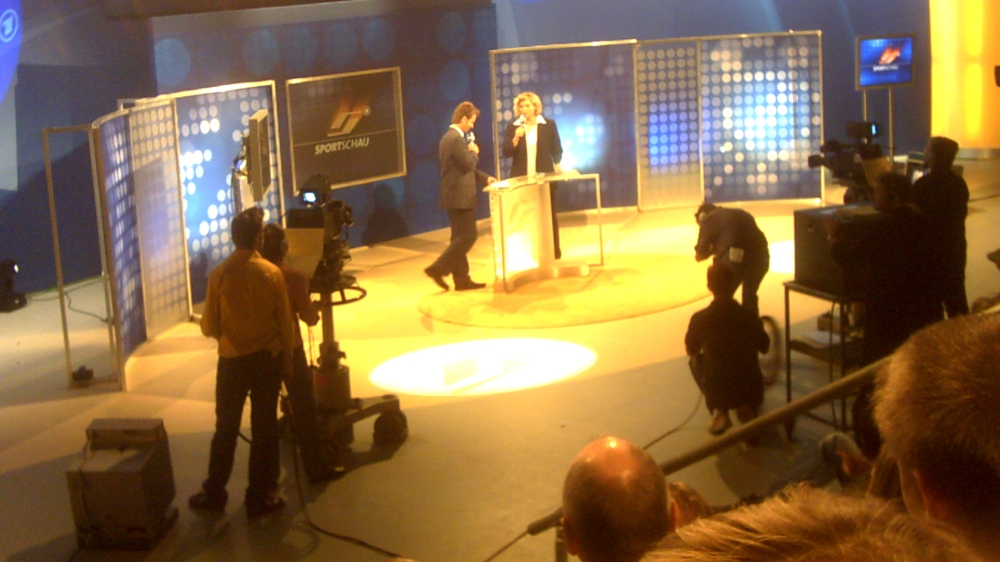
Sportschau special from the 2005 IFA in Berlin

Sportschau is a German sports magazine on broadcaster ARD, produced by WDR in Cologne. The magazine started in 1961. In its Saturday edition, the Sportschau shows a summary of the Bundesliga, whereas the Sunday edition reports on the latest events from various sports. Sportschau is aired on Das Erste and the regional stations.

Since 2008, Sportschau begins at 18:00. As there is a contractual agreement that the Bundesliga may only be shown from 18:30, the program reports about the second and third leagues in the first half-hour.

Since January 2011, the Sportschau-App has been available for Apple and Android devices.

== Special broadcast ==
ARD also uses the Sportschau title for its live sports coverage, including football matches of the Germany national team, DFB-Pokal as well as the FIFA World Cup, the UEFA European Championship, the Tour de France, winter sports and the Olympic Games. The equivalent on ZDF is Sportstudio live, referring to that channel's Das aktuelle Sportstudio.

== See also ==
- 11 Freunde
