= Stephan Strothe =

German journalist

Stephan Strothe was the US-correspondent for German news channel N24 as well as other affiliates of the ProSiebenSat.1 media group.

== Journalistic career ==
Stephan Strothe earned his master's degree studying law and political science at the University of Hamburg, Germany. During his studies, he worked as a free-lance journalist for the Hamburger Abendblatt and Norddeutscher Rundfunk.

Television career

After graduation, Stephan Strothe was offered his first full-time job in the newsroom of ARD's Tagesthemen, which, in content and prestige, is comparable to ABC's Nightline during Ted Koppel's tenure. In October 1984, Stephan Strothe left ARD to work for Germany's first commercial TV network, SAT.1, where he was head of the network's news department and was later named assistant editor-in-chief. In 1988, Stephan Strothe opened SAT.1's New York bureau, the first for a German commercial TV network.

Since 1991, the bureau of N24 has been located only a few hundred yards away from the White House in Washington, D.C. So, when Strothes goes on air, he's not sitting in front of a blue screen but actually has the real White House situated in his back.

The studio of N24 is connected to Germany through a fibre cable, which allows for more immediate responses than via satellite. The N24 news team in Washington consists, in addition to Strothe, of a producer, an editor as well as a camera man.

He retired as US-correspondent at the end of December 2016 and was replaced by Steffen Schwarzkopf on 1 May 2016.

Documentaries and news specials

Aside from covering the White House and reporting on hard news on a daily basis for N24, Stephan Strothe is a producer of documentaries and news specials on a wide variety of subjects - from the landing of the U.S. Marines in Haiti to the debate on gun control and the potential dangers of biological weapons in the hands of terrorists.

== Teaching ==
In addition to his responsibilities in Washington, Stephan Strothe teaches journalism classes in Berlin at the University of Potsdam and at Washington's American University.
