= Sabine Christiansen =

German journalist and television presenter

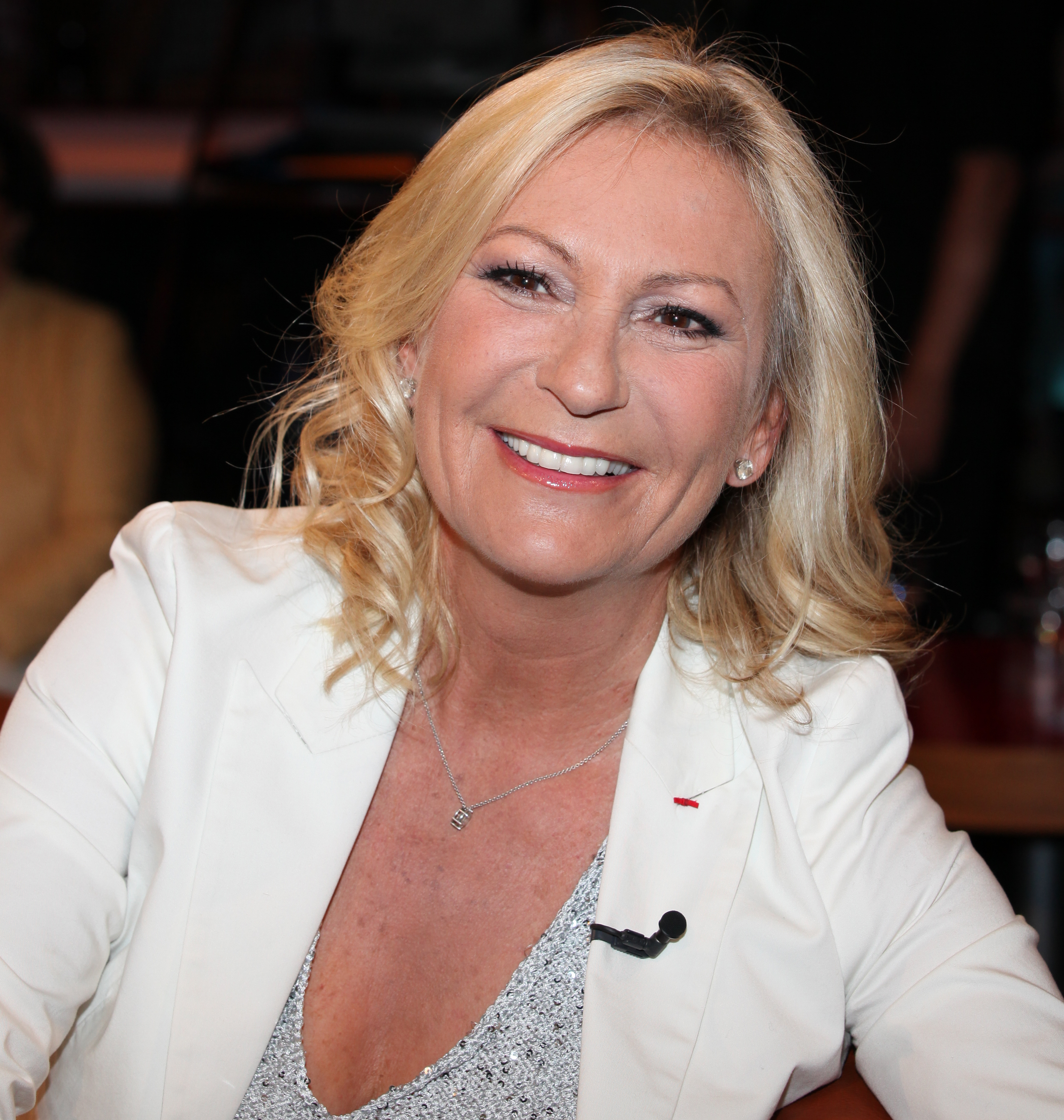
- Christiansen in 2012
- Born: 20 September 1957 (age 69); Preetz, Schleswig-Holstein, West Germany
- Occupations: German journalist and television presenter
- Spouse: Norbert Medus (m. 2008)
- Awards: See Awards

Sabine Christiansen (born 20 September 1957) is a German journalist and television presenter.

== Career ==
After finishing school in Preetz, Christiansen worked at Lufthansa from 1976 to 1982, then trained in journalism as an apprentice at the Norddeutscher Rundfunk in Hamburg until 1985. She ultimately became a regular presenter for the ARD's national TV news journal Tagesthemen, in rotation with Hanns Joachim Friedrichs (1987–1991) and Ulrich Wickert (1991–2004).

Upon leaving Tagesthemen in January 1998, Christiansen hosted her own eponymous talk show, Sabine Christiansen, which aired on Das Erste until 2007. Along with prominent German political and celebrity guests, Christiansen interviewed international political and business leaders including Bill Gates (1999, 2002), James Baker (2000), Enrique Barón Crespo (2000), Wolfgang Schüssel (2000), Tony Blair (2002), Jean-Claude Juncker (2003), Hillary Clinton (2003), Donald H. Rumsfeld (2003), Bill Clinton (2004), Kofi Annan (2004) and Condoleezza Rice (2004). In 2006, she visited President George W. Bush for an interview at the White House in Washington D.C.; it was the longest interview Bush gave to a foreign TV station during his presidency.

In addition, Christiansen moderated the TV election debates between Chancellor Gerhard Schröder and his challengers Edmund Stoiber (2002) and Angela Merkel (2005).

From 2006 until 2008, Christiansen hosted the 12-part series "Global Players with Sabine Christiansen", which aired around the world on CNBC. Donald H. Rumsfeld was the first guest of the show on 5 February 2006.

== Activism ==
Christiansen has been a UNICEF Goodwill Ambassador for Germany since 1997. In 2015 she signed an open letter which the ONE Campaign had been collecting signatures for; the letter was addressed to Angela Merkel and Nkosazana Dlamini-Zuma, urging them to focus on women as they served as the head of the G7 in Germany and the African Union in South Africa respectively, which will start to set the priorities in development funding before a main UN summit in September 2015 that will establish new development goals for the generation.

== Personal life ==
In June 2008, Christiansen married Norbert Medus.

== Other activities ==
=== Corporate boards ===
- MAGNA Real Estate, Member of the Advisory Board (since 2021)
- Arqueonautas GmbH (ARQ), Member of the Advisory Board (since 2012)
- Freenet AG, Member of the Supervisory Board (since 2012)
- Hermes Europe GmbH, Member of the Supervisory Board (since 2013)

=== Non-profit organizations ===
- Hertha BSC Foundation, Chairwoman of the Board of Trustees (since 2009)
- Laureus Sport for Good Foundation Germany/Austria, Deputy Chairwoman (since 2012)
- UNICEF National Committee of Germany, Member

== Awards ==
- 1990: Goldene Kamera, Bambi
- 1992: Bayerischer Fernsehpreis
- 1995: Adolf Grimme Award
- 1996: Goldener Löwe
- 2001: Bambi, Courage Award
- 2002: Order of Merit of the Federal Republic of Germany, Legion of Honour, Deutscher Fernsehpreis
- 2005: Women's World Award
