= Peter Kloeppel =

German journalist

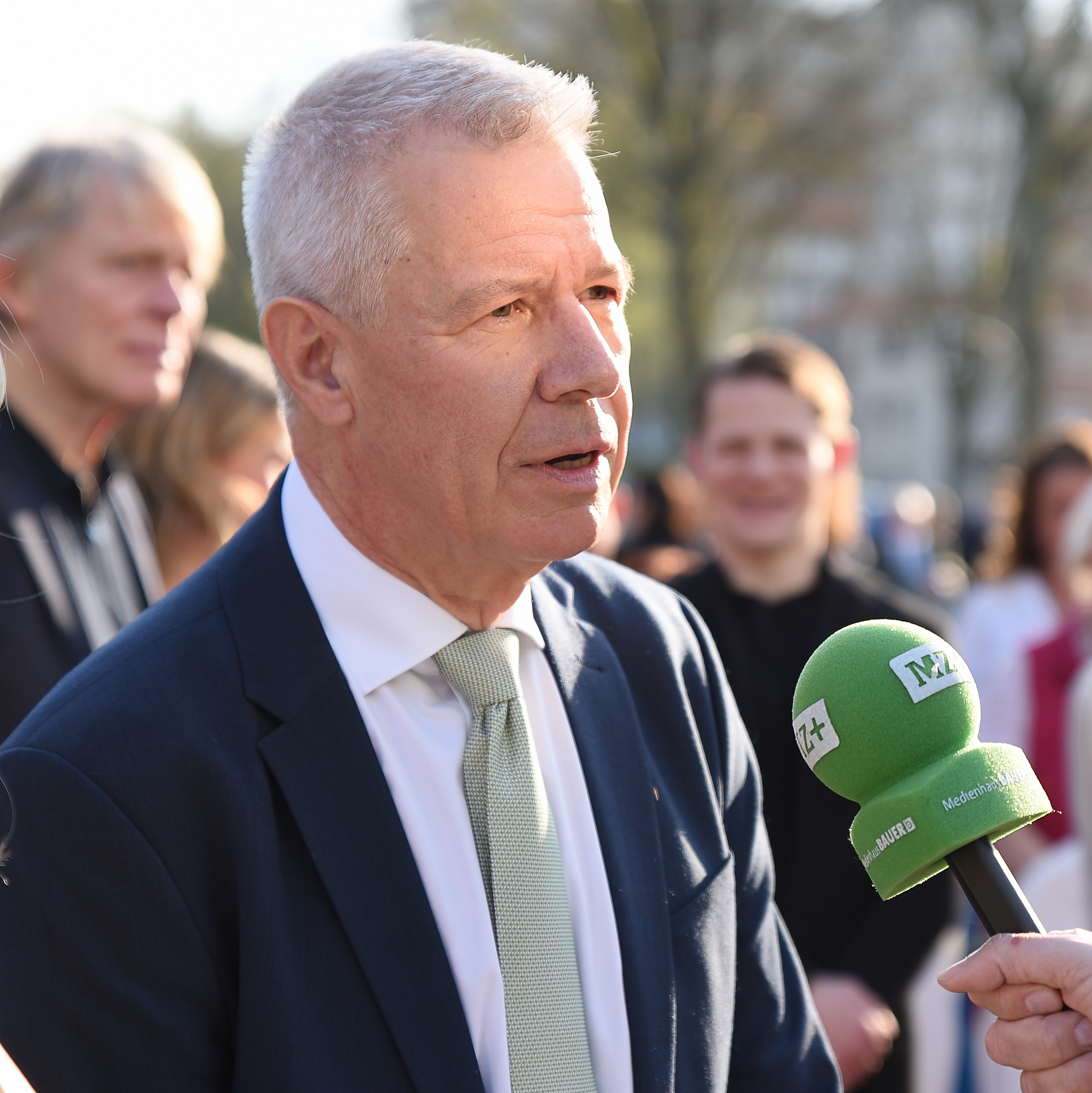
- Kloeppel in 2025
- Born: Peter Gert Johannes Kloeppel; 14 October 1958 (age 68); Frankfurt am Main, West Germany
- Occupations: Journalist, news anchor
- Spouse: Carol Sagissor (m. 1993)
- Children: 1
- Awards: See Awards

Peter Gert Johannes Kloeppel (born 14 October 1958) is a German journalist and former chief editor of RTL Television. Until 2024, he was chief anchor of RTL's flagship daily television news program RTL aktuell.

== Early life and education ==
Kloeppel was born in Frankfurt. After completing his Abitur in Bad Homburg in 1977, he studied agriculture in Göttingen. He attended the Henri-Nannen-School in Hamburg from 1983 to 1985, making his first experiences with RTL.

== Career ==
From 1985 onwards, Kloeppel worked at RTL's Bonn studio, before becoming the network's first correspondent in New York, covering the Gulf War in 1990 and 1991. In April 1992, Kloeppel became head anchor of the RTL evening news, and from 1994 on covered all federal and state elections in Germany.

Kloeppel gained fame and respect for his enduring coverage of the September 11 terrorist attacks in 2001; he remained on air all night and the following morning, not sleeping for more than 24 hours, and was later awarded the prestigious Grimme Preis. He also received an Emmy nomination for this very show.

Kloeppel also founded the RTL Journalistenschule für TV und Multimedia in 2001. He is the school's director and CEO.

Alongside Peter Limbourg, Kloeppel moderated the first of two TV election debates between Chancellor Gerhard Schröder and his challenger Edmund Stoiber ahead of the 2002 elections, which was aired live on two of Germany's private television channels during prime-time.

On 1 November 2004, Kloeppel became RTL chief editor. On 30 July 2014 he stepped down from this position to have more time with his family. He remained chief anchor of RTL Aktuell for ten more years, finally announcing his retirement from that role for August 2024.

Alongside Maybrit Illner, Anne Will and Stefan Raab, Kloeppel also moderated the only TV election debate between incumbent chancellor Angela Merkel and her competitor Peer Steinbrück ahead of the 2013 elections, which was aired live on four of Germany's most-watched television channels during prime-time. Together with Pinar Atalay, he later moderated one of three TV debates between the three candidates to succeed Merkel – Annalena Baerbock, Armin Laschet and Olaf Scholz – ahead of the 2021 elections.

== Personal life ==
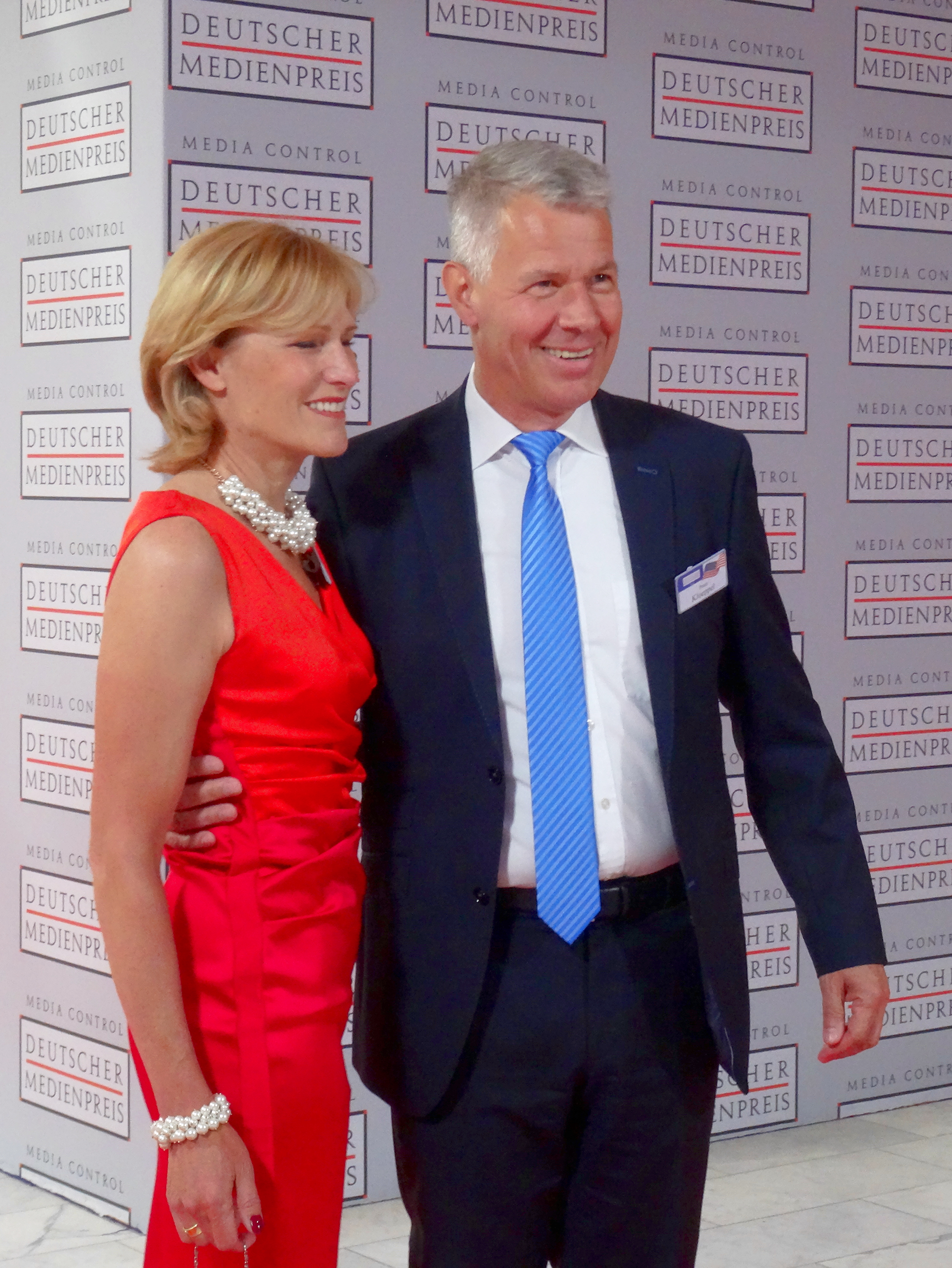
Kloeppel with his wife in 2017

Kloeppel has been married to American television producer Carol Sagissor since 1993. Their daughter Geena was born on 21 June 1996.

== Awards ==
- 1993: New York Festival (Best News Anchor)
- 1996, 2008: Goldener Löwe, Bambi
- 1997: Bayerischer Fernsehpreis, Telestar
- 2002: Spezial-Grimme-Preis (for the reporting of September 11 attacks), Goldener Gong
- 2009: RIAS-Preis
- 2012: Bayerischer Fernsehpreis (for a documentary about the life changing effects of the 11 September attacks)
- 2017: Goldene Kamera for "Best Information"
