= Damian Borth =

German computer scientist

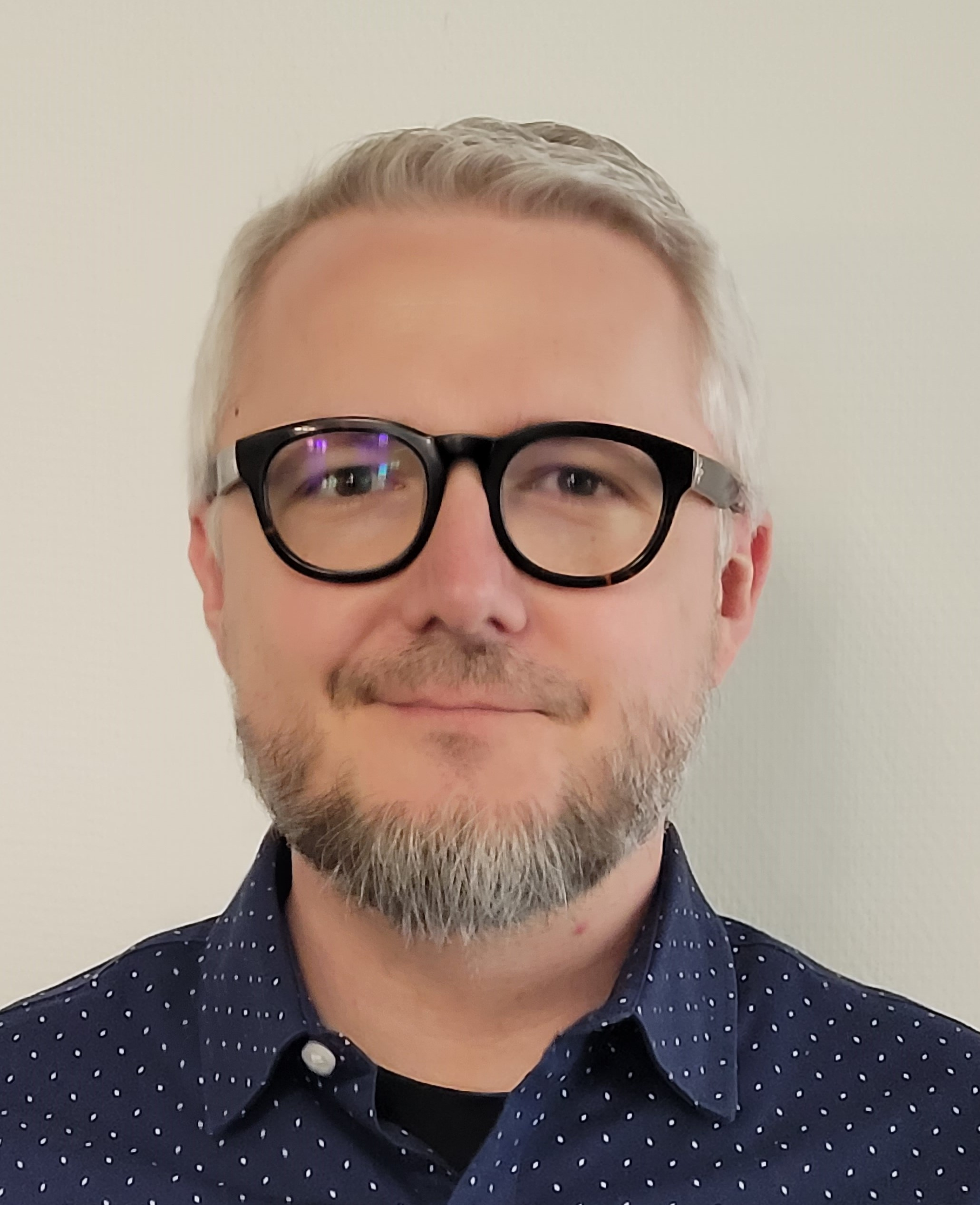
- Damian Borth, Professor for Artificial Intelligence and Machine Learning at the University of St. Gallen in 2025
- Born: 1981 (age 44–45); Opole, Poland
- Occupations: Computer Scientist and AI Researcher
- Years active: 2014–present

Damian Borth (1981) is a German computer scientist and university professor of informatics. He received the Ph.D. degree from the Technical University of Kaiserslautern in 2014 with the dissertation entitled Visual Learning of Socio-Video Semantics. Borth became Director of the Deep Learning Competence Center at the German Research Centre for Artificial Intelligence (DFKI) in Kaiserslautern. In 2018, he joined the University of St. Gallen in Switzerland as Professor of Artificial Intelligence and Machine Learning. In addition, he became academic director of the Ph.D. program in Computer Science at this university. Since July 2027 he cofounded Weight Space Labs, a startup in the are of weight space learning and weight-space programming

== Life ==
Borth was born in Poland. The family moved to Germany when Damian was six years old. He grew up in Mannheim and Heidelberg. At the Carl-Benz-School he finished high school in 2001. From 2001 to 2003, he studied telecommunications engineering to obtain a degree as Diplomingenieur. From 2003 until 2007, he was employed by Daimler Benz in the Republic of China, Taipei, to write software for the training of employees in Asia. Then, he studied informatics at the Technical University of Kaiserslautern and got his Master Degree in 2010. During the following Ph.D. studies, he was a Visiting Researcher with the Digital Video and Multimedia Laboratory at the Columbia University in New York City during 2012. After obtaining his Ph.D. in the field of video analysis in 2014, he did postdoctoral research at the University of California, Berkeley and the International Computer Science Institute (ICSI) in Berkeley together with Jitendra Malik and Alexei A. Efros. At the German Research Center for Artificial Intelligence DFKI, he was Principle Investigator of the NVIDIA AI Lab. For his work at the Deep Learning Competence Center of DFKI, a German newspaper called Borth Germany’s Mister Deep Learning. He co-founded Sociovestix Laboratories, a social enterprise in the area of financial data science.

In September 2018, Borth started as Full Professor of Artificial Intelligence (AI) and Machine Learning at the University of St. Gallen, Switzerland. He helped this university to establish a computer science department. As a tool to investigate applications of AI models independently, the university bought a supercomputer, type Nvidia DGX-2. This computer is part of a specialized computer facility in Gais AR.

Borth teaches at the School of Computer Science lectures in Deep Learning, Machine Learning, and Artificial Intelligence at the bachelor and master level. He also is involved in executive education at other departments of the University of St. Gallen as well as at the collaborative executive education program with the ETH Zurich. As Academic Director of the Ph.D. program in Computer Science in St. Gallen, he already advised several Ph.D. candidates.

Borth voiced his opinion on AI regulation.

== Other Activities ==
- Member Ringier AI Advisory Board since 2023
- Board Member Property Captain since 2022
- Member Board of Trustees, International Computer Science Institute
- Board Member, German Data Science Society Prof. Damian Borth
- Member Advisory Committee, Roman Herzog Institute Damian Borth: Zwischen Angst und Euphorie.
- AI Grid Ambassador in Switzerland Prof. Damian Borth

== Awards ==
- HSG Impact Award, 2023 Hyper-Representations: Learning from populations of neural networks
- ACM SIGMM Test of Time Award, 2023
- Google Research Scholar Award, 2022
- Thomas Mann House Fellowship, 2019
- AI Fellow, Nvidia, 2018
- Nvidia AI Lab Award, 2016

== Publications ==
- Damian Borth Google Scholar
- Damian Borth IEEE Explore
- Borth, Damian researchgate.net
