= RTL aktuell =

- Genre: News program
- Theme music composer: Frank Gari (1994-1997); Non-Stop Music (1998-present)
- Country of origin: Germany
- Original language: German

Production
- Production location: Cologne
- Running time: 20 minutes
- Production company: RTL News GmbH

Original release
- Network: RTL
- Release: 5 April 1988 – present

RTL aktuell is a German television news programme broadcast on the commercial station RTL. The main 20-minute bulletin airs every evening at 18:45 CET, supplemented by a breakfast news bulletin (Deutschland am Morgen, formerly Punkt 6, Punkt 7, and Punkt 8 and Guten Morgen Deutschland), a lunchtime magazine programme (Punkt 12), a daily short news programme in the afternoon (RTL News), and a late night bulletin (RTL Nachtjournal). Weekend bulletins are branded as RTL aktuell Weekend.

RTL aktuell was launched in 1988 as the direct replacement for 7 vor 7, and since 11 September 2010 it is broadcast in HD.

== Presenters ==
Presenter	Time	Notes
News
Roberta Bieling	since 2023	Anchor
Christopher Wittich	since 2021	Anchor
Peter Kloeppel	1992-2024	former Anchor
Annett Möller	since 2008	Stand-in anchor
Maik Meuser	since 2015	Stand-in anchor
Lothar Keller	2006–2016	Stand-in anchor
Kay-Sölve Richter	2004–2005	Stand-in anchor
Ilka Eßmüller	2001–2007	Stand-in anchor
Susanne Kronzucker	1995–2003	Stand-in anchor
Petra Schwarzenberg	1994–2005	Stand-in anchor
Christoph Teuner	1992–1997	Stand-in anchor
Claus Hommer	1987–1991	weekend editions
Angelika Bade		
Michael Karr		
Ann-Katrin Schröder		
Hans Meiser	1984–1992	former Chief anchor
Sport
Andreas von Thien	2024-	Main anchor, since 1996 Stand-in anchor
Ulrike von der Groeben	1989-2023	former Main anchor
Birgit von Bentzel	since 2003	Stand-in anchor
Anna Fleischhauer	since 2021	Stand-in anchor
Weather
Christian Häckl	since 1994	Main anchor
Maxi Biewer	since 1992	Stand-in anchor
Bernd Fuchs	since 1997	Stand-in anchor
Eva Imhof	since 2010	Stand-in anchor

== Correspondent ==
- Antonia Rados (Chief international correspondent)

== Awards ==
In 2007, RTL aktuell won the Deutscher Fernsehpreis (German TV award) in the category of Beste Informationssendung (Best News Broadcast).

== Market share ==
Market shares of RTL aktuell in the target audience of 14 to 49-years-old:

Year	2000	2001	2002	2003	2004	2005	2006	2007	2008	2009	2010	2011
Market share (%)	23,1	22,4	20,2	22,2	20,7	19,7	18,2	19,3	19,4	19,9	19,9	19,8
