= Fritz Schenk =

German journalist (1930–2006)

Fritz Schenk (10 March 1930, Helbra – 4 May 2006, Frankfurt am Main) was a German publicist, journalist and television anchorman. He became well known for the general public thanks to his participation in ZDF-Magazin.

== Family ==
Schenk was born into a politically active and traditionally social democratic family in Helbra. A number of his family members were persecuted by Nazis in the Third Reich.

His father was a hydraulic engineer and worked for years managing a waterworks in Harz region, which belonged to the German Democratic Republic after 1949. When Fritz Schenk later escaped to the Federal Republic of Germany, his father was dismissed from the job and died of heart infarction on 10 November 1962 after an interrogation by the Stasi. Schenk later accused Communists throughout all of his life of having killed his father, whereas Nazis had just treated him in an inhuman manner

Since 1951, Fritz Schenk was married to Rosemarie Müller. They had three sons.

== Positions in the GDR ==
Schenk joined the German Social Democratic Party after World War II. When the party was forcibly unified with the Communist Party of Germany, he became a member of the Socialist Unity Party of Germany (SED).

Schenk had learnt to become a print worker and worked in the graphics industry. He later graduated from the East German College of Economics. He eventually worked as head of a printing house in Meißen.

Since 1952 he worked for the State Planning Commission of the GDR, becoming later that year a personal assistant of its new chief Bruno Leuschner, who became in the following year also a candidate member of the Politburo and the GDR's most influential politician on economic affairs. Schenk also met SED chief Walter Ulbricht. In 1957, the Stasi began to suspect him of espionage and arrested him. Having signed a declaration of co-operation with the state security bodies, he was released. He fled immediately through West Berlin (1957), whence he moved to West Germany with the assistance of the Eastern Office of the Social Democratic Party, an institution maintaining contacts with the dissidents and fugitives from East Germany .

== Career as a journalist ==
In West, Schenk initially worked as a freelance journalist and author. In 1960, he re-joined the Social Democratic Party. He abstained from standing as a candidate to the parliament, after he had initially considered this option. He worked for a number of institutes that dealt with East–West issues, incl. a possible German reunification. In 1972 he resigned from the SPD due to his criticism of the Ostpolitik of Willy Brandt.

Since 1971, Schenk worked for the ZDF. He was the deputy of the presenter Gerhard Löwenthal of the popular ZDF-Magazin, that during the 1970s and 1980s raised controversy due to conservative coverage of political events. In 1974/75, Schenk was a member of the conservative Bund Freies Deutschland. He was the Press spokesman of that organization. When Gerhard Löwenthal retired in 1987, Schenk succeeded him as the editor and presenter of the ZDF-Magazin. The broadcast, however, was replaced in April 1988 with the new broadcast Studio 1. At the same time, Schenk became managing editor of the ZDF editorial board.

He retired in early 1990s, but continued with journalistic activities, publishing numerous articles and opinion pieces in newspapers and magazines. He was often asked to hold lectures or presentations due to his experiences gathered from his career in the former German Democratic Republic. He was since December 2004 a regular contributor and columnist to the conservative weekly Junge Freiheit. In the column "Die Woche" ('The Week'), Schenk commented on the actual political events in Germany.

== Critical solidarity with Martin Hohmann ==
He attracted public attention with his activities connected with the Martin Hohmann affair. When a scandal erupted in October 2003, as some regarded his speech as antisemitic, a proceeding was started over expelling Hohmann from the Christian Democratic Union. Schenk, who had been a member of the CDU since 1999, accompanied with his supporters, started the initiative "Critical Solidarity with Martin Hohmann". The signatories of their appeal explained, that they regarded Hohmann's speech as controversial and in some parts questionable, but not as antisemitic. Hence they supported his continuing membership in the CDU and its parliamentary party. All in all, 10,200 people signed the appeal.

On 22 July 2005, Schenk resigned from his positions within the initiative, as Martin Hohmann had declared that he would take part in the 2005 parliamentary election as an independent. Thus, Schenk saw this declaration as Hohmann's decision to withdraw from the Christian Democratic Party.

== Writings ==
- Schenk, Fritz (1960). Magie der Planwirtschaft (in German). Kiepenheuer & Witsch.
- Schenk, Fritz (1962). Im Vorzimmer der Diktatur: 12 Jahre Pankow (in German). Kiepenheuer & Witsch.
- Schenk, Fritz (1969). Das rote Wirtschaftswunder: Die zentrale Planwirtschaft als Machtmittel der SED-Politik. Schriftenreihe der Studiengesellschaft für Zeitprobleme e.V. Bad Godesberg (in German). Seewald.
- Schenk, Fritz (1969). Anerkennung, ja oder Nein?: Standpunkte e. engagierten Demokraten z. Deutschlandfrage (in German). Verlangsanst. Neue Presse.
- Schenk, Fritz (1972). Kommunistische Grundsatzerklärungen 1957–1971 (in German). [Köln]: Verlag Wissenschaft und Politik. ISBN 3-8046-8447-5. OCLC 511136.
- Schenk, Fritz (1989). Mein doppeltes Vaterland (in German). Würzburg: J.W. Naumann. ISBN 3-88567-057-7. OCLC 22068907.
- Schenk, Fritz (2004). Der Fall Hohmann : die Dokumentation (in German). München: Universitas. ISBN 3-8004-1466-X. OCLC 55976068.

== Awards ==
- Jakob-Kaiser-Preis (1968), Fernsehpreis des Bundesministeriums für gesamtdeutsche Fragen
