= Johannes B. Kerner =

German television host

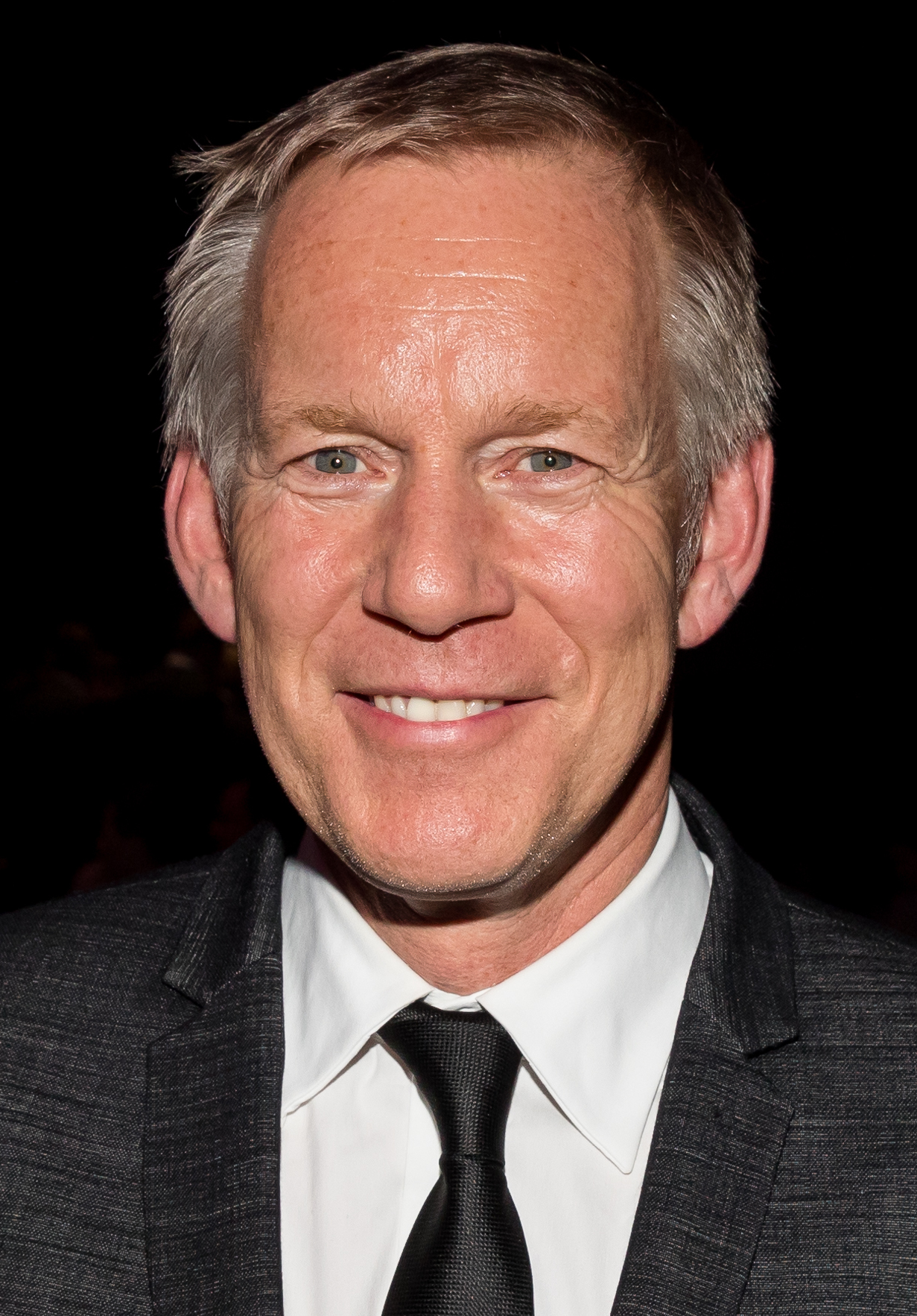
- Kerner in 2018
- Born: Johannes Baptist Kerner; 9 December 1964 (age 61); Bonn, West Germany
- Occupations: TV host, journalist
- Years active: 1986–present
- Spouse: Britta Becker (1996–present)
- Children: 4

Johannes Baptist Kerner (born 9 December 1964) is a German television host, journalist, and former sportscaster.

== Early life ==
Born in Bonn, Kerner was raised in Hersel, Bornheim, in a Catholic household. He attended boarding school at Aloisiuskolleg in Bonn and went on to study business administration in Berlin, but did not graduate.

== Career ==
He started his career in television at Sender Freies Berlin in 1986 first as an intern, then as a reporter for local sportscasts. From 1990 to 1992 he regularly hosted "Punkt 4 Länderreport", a national afternoon newscast on ARD.

He became known to a wider audience as a host and producer for the football show ran – Sat.1 Bundesliga on the private Sat.1 channel when the network acquired the broadcasting rights to the Bundesliga, the highest national football league in Germany. He hosted the show from August 1992 until end of 1997 in rotation with several other young broadcasters who went on to become TV personalities in Germany, including Reinhold Beckmann (who now hosts his own weekly talk show), Oliver Welke and Monica Lierhaus. For this show he received a number of awards, including a prize as the most well-liked sportscaster in 1996 and 1997 by the German sports magazine Sport Bild.

In 1996, Kerner started his first daily afternoon talkshow on Sat 1 simply called Kerner.

In 1997, he switched to a public television channel again, this time to ZDF (as an independent freelancer) where he was a host for the weekly sports review das aktuelle sportstudio (until 2006) and a number of football games played by the German national team. He served as main host for all games broadcast by ZDF during the FIFA World Cup 2006 in Germany in front of a large live audience in Berlin, for which he received a Deutscher Fernsehpreis award (comparable to an Emmy). In addition to this, he was master of ceremonies for several special show programs on ZDF such as yearly reviews of the people and stories making news in the past twelve months around Christmas.

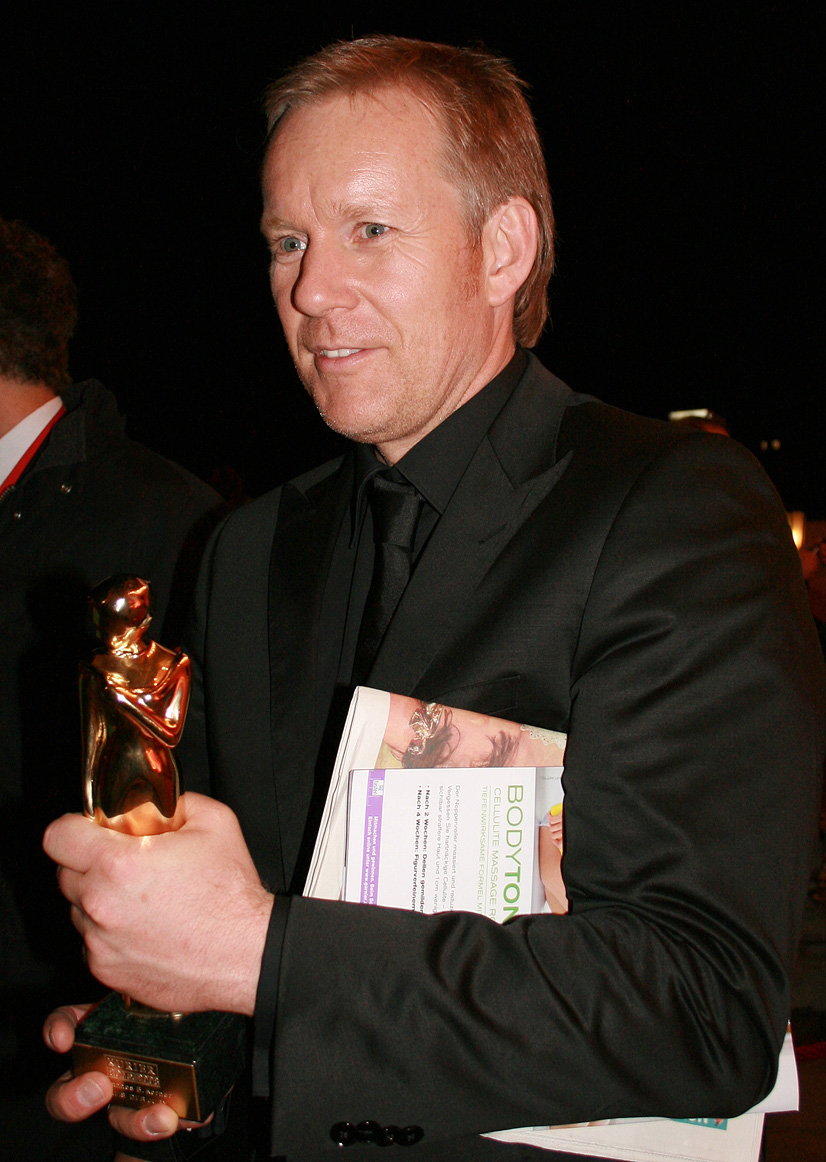
Kerner in 2008

In 2009, Kerner switched back to Sat.1 for a TV show simply called Kerner, as a magazine now.

== Johannes B. Kerner Show ==
His eponymous talk show went on air every Thursday night on ZDF at around 11 pm since January 1998. It was expanded to four times per week from Tuesday to Friday in January 2002. The show features mostly German celebrities and TV personalities, as well as regular people's stories. Unlike many late night shows, Johannes B. Kerner does not open with Kerner holding any stand-up monologue and only has him sitting at a desk and talking with a number of guests seated next to him (usually three to five). Also there is no regular live band in the studio.

Since 21 January 2005, his Friday evening session has been transformed into a cooking show called Kochen bei Kerner ("Cooking with Kerner"). Normally the show features five chefs who each explain and prepare a course for an elaborate meal live and within one hour. After each cook has finished his or her dish Kerner and the others are tasting and informally judging it, before some people in the audience also receive a sample of it. The show regularly features chefs from German-speaking countries such as Johann Lafer, Alfons Schubeck, Tim Mälzer, Sarah Wiener, Ralf Zacherl and Horst Lichter, as well as occasionally some chefs like Jamie Oliver.

== Personal life ==
Kerner married Britta Becker, a former field hockey World Cup and Olympic medalist for Germany in April 1996. They have four children: Emily Blomma (born January 1999), Nik David (born October 2001), Polly Marie (born 30 June 2007) and Jilly Lina (born 20 October 2009). The family currently resides in Hamburg, where his talk show is produced.
