= Willkommen 20xx =

- Genre: New Year programming
- Presented by: Andrea Kiewel (2013/14–2025/26); Johannes B. Kerner (2016/17–2025/26)
- Country of origin: Germany
- No. of episodes: 15

Original release
- Network: ZDF
- Release: 31 December 2010 – 1 January 2026

Willkommen 20xx (English: Welcome 20xx) was the name given to the New Year's Eve show broadcast on German broadcaster ZDF from 2010/11 until 2025/26. It was presented by Andrea Kiewel and Johannes B. Kerner.

From 2010/11 until 2024/25 it broadcast the party at the Brandenburg Gate in Berlin. Since 2025/26, it has been hosted at the HafenCity in Hamburg, after Berlin's mayor Kai Wegner refused to fund the annual event. For 2026/27, ZDF will not broadcast a New Year's show, instead opting for a special episode of game show Der Quiz-Champion, hosted by Kerner and starring Kiewel.

== Format ==
The show broadcast the live New Year's party from the Brandenburg Gate to the Victory Column along the Straße des 17. Juni. Many domestic artists have performed on the show, as well as international artists including the Gipsy Kings with Bamboléo in 2019/20; Johnny Logan and Nemo in 2024/25.

Due to the energy crisis affecting Germany, the 2022/23 edition was moved from the Brandenburg Gate to a smaller stage at the Pariser Platz, where, for security reasons, only a few thousand could stand in front of the stage. The next year's edition returned to the Brandenburg Gate.

After the city's authorities refused to fund the event at the Brandenburg Gate for 2025/26, producers moved the event to a floating stage in the HafenCity in Hamburg.

In the minute before midnight, producers usually played Europe's The Final Countdown from 2016/17 while Kiewel and Kerner chat to fill time. Thirty seconds before midnight, the clock in the top-right screen would disappear and an announcer would say Deutschland, macht sich bereit. ("Germany, get ready.") before a ten-second countdown. After midnight, producers would either play Ode to Joy, a cover of it; or have performers sing Auld Lang Syne.

The show's usual slogan was Celebrate at the Gate.

== Broadcast ==
ZDF replaced RTL Zwei and, before them, Sat.1, which used to broadcast the party from the Brandenburg Gate, attracting impressive ratings. The first episode was broadcast live on New Year's Eve 2010 from 11pm, after the music show Die ZDF-Hitparty, which started at 9:30pm. The next year, the show was extended to start at 9:45pm, pushing Die ZDF-Hitparty back to start at 8:15pm. For the 2015/16 edition, the Hitparty was replaced by Guten Rutsch!, with no change to the start time of Willkommen... In 2016/17, the show was extended again to 8:15pm with Johannes B. Kerner joining the show, replacing Matze Knop. For the 2018/19 edition, the show returned to 9:45pm, before going back to 8:15pm the next year. In 2019/20, the show started at 9:45pm once more, yet since 2021/22 it has returned to the 8:15pm timeslot.

== Episodes ==
Episode	Title	Location	Start time	Presenters		Ratings
1	Willkommen 2011	Brandenburg Gate, Berlin	23:00	Mirjam Weichselbraun	Norbert Lehmann	3,990,000
2	Willkommen 2012	Brandenburg Gate, Berlin	21:45	Mirjam Weichselbraun	Joko und Klaas	3,520,000
3	Willkommen 2013	Brandenburg Gate, Berlin	21:45	Mirjam Weichselbraun	Joko und Klaas	3,110,000
4	Willkommen 2014	Brandenburg Gate, Berlin	21:45	Andrea Kiewel	Alexander Mazza	4,110,000
5	Willkommen 2015	Brandenburg Gate, Berlin	21:45	Andrea Kiewel	Alexander Mazza	3,580,000
6	Willkommen 2016	Brandenburg Gate, Berlin	21:45	Andrea Kiewel	Matze Knop	3,630,000
7	Willkommen 2017	Brandenburg Gate, Berlin	20:15	Andrea Kiewel	Johannes B. Kerner	3,210,000
8	Willkommen 2018	Brandenburg Gate, Berlin	20:15	Andrea Kiewel	Johannes B. Kerner	2,980,000
9	Willkommen 2019	Brandenburg Gate, Berlin	21:45	Andrea Kiewel	Johannes B. Kerner	3,040,000
10	Willkommen 2020	Brandenburg Gate, Berlin	20:15	Andrea Kiewel	Johannes B. Kerner	2,990,000
11	Willkommen 2021	Brandenburg Gate, Berlin	21:45	Andrea Kiewel	Johannes B. Kerner	3,580,000
12	Willkommen 2022	Pariser Platz, Berlin	20:15	Andrea Kiewel	Johannes B. Kerner	2,250,000
13	Willkommen 2023	Brandenburg Gate, Berlin	20:15	Andrea Kiewel	Johannes B. Kerner	3,050,000
14	Willkommen 2024	Brandenburg Gate, Berlin	20:15	Andrea Kiewel	Johannes B. Kerner	3,110,000
15	Willkommen 2025	Brandenburg Gate, Berlin	20:15	Andrea Kiewel	Johannes B. Kerner	2,600,000
16	Willkommen 2026	HafenCity, Hamburg	20:15	Andrea Kiewel	Johannes B. Kerner	2,470,000
