= Palina Glebova =

German athlete and Guiness Record holder (born 1996)

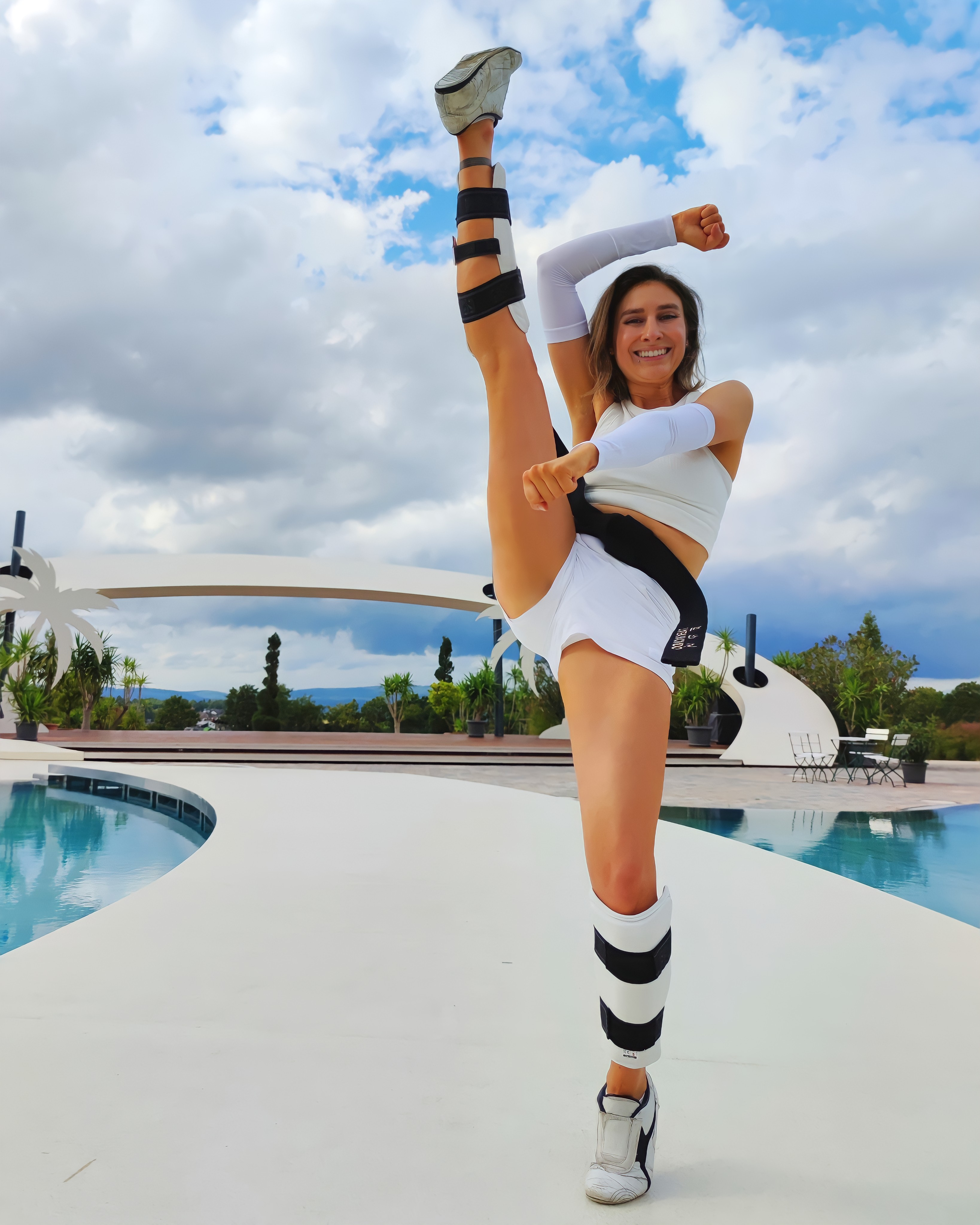
- Palina Glebova at ZDF in 2021

Personal information
- Born: 19 September 1996 (age 30) Moscow, Russia
- Education: University of South Wales
- Occupations: Artist and performer

Sport
- Country: Germany
- Sport: Taekwondo
- Event: Recognized Poomsae
- Club: Tangun Hamburg e.V.
- Coached by: Joe Alexander

Palina Glebova (born 19 September 1996 in Moscow) is a German taekwondo athlete and multiple Guinness World Records title holder.

In March 2026, Guinness World Records profiled her as being on a mission to become the "Queen of World Records".

== World records ==
As of October 2026, Guinness World Records lists Glebova as the holder of 17 current record titles. She was also featured in three consecutive editions of the Guinness World Records book (2025–2027).

On 12 September 2026, Glebova undertook twelve Guinness World Records attempts in a single day in Hamburg and achieved eleven record titles. The remaining attempt, for the fastest time to tie a martial arts belt, was repeated successfully on 5 October 2026. She had prepared for the event with four months of intensive training.

- Fastest time to tie a martial arts belt, achieving 3.81 seconds (5 October 2026)
- Highest unassisted martial arts 360 kick (female), achieving a height of 1.86 metres (12 September 2026)
- Farthest unassisted martial arts kick (female), achieving a distance of 2.64 metres (12 September 2026)
- Most balloons burst by high-heel kicks above the head in one minute, achieving 38 balloons (12 September 2026) and reclaiming the title, which she had previously held with 22 balloons (19 November 2024, during a Guinness World Records Day celebration)
- Most balloons burst by kicking whilst hopping in one minute, achieving 50 balloons (12 September 2026)
- Most darts thrown with the foot in one minute, achieving 20 darts (12 September 2026) and reclaiming the title, which she had previously held with nine darts and a score of 110 (15 November 2023, during a Guinness World Records Day celebration)
- Most martial arts kicks in one minute using alternate legs, achieving 116 kicks (12 September 2026)
- Most high heels flicked into a basketball hoop in one minute, achieving six high heels (12 September 2026)
- Most balloons burst by high-heels thrown with the foot in one minute, achieving 13 balloons (12 September 2026)
- Most pine boards broken by kicking whilst simultaneously skipping in one minute (female), achieving eight boards (12 September 2026)
- Most pine boards broken by jump kicks in one minute (female), achieving 24 boards (12 September 2026) and reclaiming the title, which she had previously held with 16 boards (18 November 2025, during a Guinness World Records Day celebration)
- Most pine boards broken by a weight attached to the hair in one minute, achieving 15 boards (12 September 2026)
- Most balloons burst by darts thrown with the foot in one minute, achieving twelve balloons (8 January 2026)
- Most balloons burst by darts thrown in one minute, achieving twelve balloons (8 January 2026)
- Most plastic bottles teed up and side kicked in one minute, achieving twelve bottles (18 November 2025, during a Guinness World Records Day celebration)
- Most darts thrown with the feet and caught by hand in one minute (team of two), achieving 13 catches with Joe Alexander (18 November 2025, during a Guinness World Records Day celebration)
- Most descending balloons burst by darts thrown with the foot in one minute, achieving ten balloons (19 November 2024, during a Guinness World Records Day celebration)

In addition to her Guinness World Records titles, Glebova has set seven additional records during live broadcasts of the German television programme ZDF-Fernsehgarten and at Guinness World Records Day events.

- Most boards broken in thirty seconds with a jump front kick, achieving 13 boards (18 November 2020, during a Guinness World Records Day celebration)
- Most boards broken in thirty seconds by a mixed team of two with Joe Alexander (18 November 2020, during a Guinness World Records Day celebration)
- Most boards broken in one minute with a jump front kick, achieving 23 boards during a live broadcast of the German TV show ZDF-Fernsehgarten (8 August 2021)
- Most aerated concrete blocks broken while holding a raw egg without breaking it, achieving three stacks of four blocks during a live broadcast of the German TV show ZDF-Fernsehgarten (10 July 2022)
- Most balloons burst in one minute by throwing darts with the foot from a distance of three metres, achieving 16 balloons (16 November 2022, during a Guinness World Records Day celebration)
- Most darts thrown into a dartboard with the foot in one minute, achieving seven darts during a live broadcast of the German TV show ZDF-Fernsehgarten (14 May 2023)
- Most bottles balanced on the foot and side kicked over a three-metre distance in 90 seconds, achieving twelve bottles during a live broadcast of the German TV show ZDF-Fernsehgarten (20 July 2025)

== Taekwondo career ==
Glebova began practising the Korean martial art taekwondo at the age of ten. By 2026, she had practised taekwondo for 20 years and held a fourth-degree black belt. At junior level, Glebova achieved several podium places in full-contact (kyorugi) competitions at both regional and state championships. She has also been an active poomsae athlete since she was a junior.

Glebova's highest national placement since competing as a senior was a fourth place in the women's individual traditional poomsae category at a German national ranking tournament. From 2015 to 2025, Glebova was both a kyorugi and a poomsae referee for Germany.

== Tournament record ==
| Year | Event | Location | Discipline | Place |
|---|---|---|---|---|
| 2024 | Mecklenburg-Western Pomerania State Championships | (Germany) Leezen | Ilbo Taeryon | 1st |
| 2023 | Schleswig-Holstein State Championships | (Germany) Gettorf | Poomsae Individual | 3rd |
| 2019 | Schleswig-Holstein State Championships | (Germany) Kaltenkirchen | Poomsae Individual | 3rd |
| 2019 | Schleswig-Holstein State Championships | (Germany) Kaltenkirchen | Board Breaking | 2nd |
| 2017 | Schleswig-Holstein State Championships | (Germany) Kaltenkirchen | Poomsae Individual | 2nd |
| 2014 | Schleswig-Holstein State Championships | (Germany) Kiebitzreihe | Poomsae Pairs | 2nd |
| 2013 | Schleswig-Holstein State Championships | (Germany) Kiebitzreihe | Poomsae Pairs | 3rd |
| 2013 | German National Ranking Tournament | (Germany) Bad Münder | Poomsae Individual | 4th |
| 2012 | Schleswig-Holstein State Championships | (Germany) Kiebitzreihe | Board Breaking | 1st |
| 2012 | Schleswig-Holstein State Championships | (Germany) Kiebitzreihe | Poomsae Individual | 2nd |
| 2012 | Schleswig-Holstein State Championships | (Germany) Kiebitzreihe | Poomsae Pairs | 2nd |

== Public appearances ==
Since 2021, Glebova has been a recurring guest on the live television programme ZDF-Fernsehgarten, where she has performed taekwondo demonstrations and undertaken world record attempts. In 2021, Glebova appeared in the music video of the pop song "Siamo fatti cosi" by Anthony Bauer jr. and Rocco Costa.

In 2024, Glebova appeared on the Spanish television game show Adivina qué hago, where she performed a taekwondo demonstration and threw darts with her foot at balloons placed to the left and right of presenter Santi Millán. In October 2024, Glebova was featured in season four episode two of the German TV Show Germany's biggest secrets ("Deutschlands größte Geheimnisse") on Kabel Eins.

== Education ==
Glebova completed an apprenticeship as International Administration Manager in 2020 and obtained a Bachelor's degree in Business Studies in 2022.
