= Bares für Rares =

German TV show on ZDF

- Genre: Infotainment
- Presented by: Horst Lichter
- Country of origin: Germany
- Original language: German
- No. of seasons: 8
- No. of episodes: 1000+

Production
- Running time: 45–55 minutes
- Production companies: Warner Bros. International Television Production, ZDF

Original release
- Release: 3 August 2013

Bares für Rares (transl. Cash for Rarities), also known as Cash or Trash in English, is a German television series on Zweites Deutsches Fernsehen (ZDF) presented by Horst Lichter, produced since 2013. It was first aired on 3 August 2013, on ZDF's sister channel ZDFneo and includes eight seasons with a total of more than 1000 episodes as of 2020.

The show, which was awarded the Goldene Kamera in 2018 and the Deutscher Fernsehpreis in 2019, is considered the most successful show in the ZDF afternoon program thanks to its good audience ratings. On weekdays, around 3 million people watch with a regular market share of around 25 percent, even for the repeats in the early evening program on ZDFneo, up to 1.5 million viewers can sometimes be found. In 2019, the show was viewed by 5.65 million people on average.

== Concept ==
In the show, selected applicants each present a curiosity, rarity or antique they have brought with them. Once they have received their expertise, they will have the opportunity on site to offer their exhibit to a changing five-person podium for sale and, ideally, to sell it to the highest bidder for Bares ("cash").

Since July 2017, the station has occasionally been showing special evening editions with unusual exhibits in an extended setting, in which prominent providers also present and sell objects, sometimes for charitable purposes. In this format, there are seven dealers in the sales area.

It can be considered a German spin-off of the British TV format Antiques Roadshow.

== Seasons ==
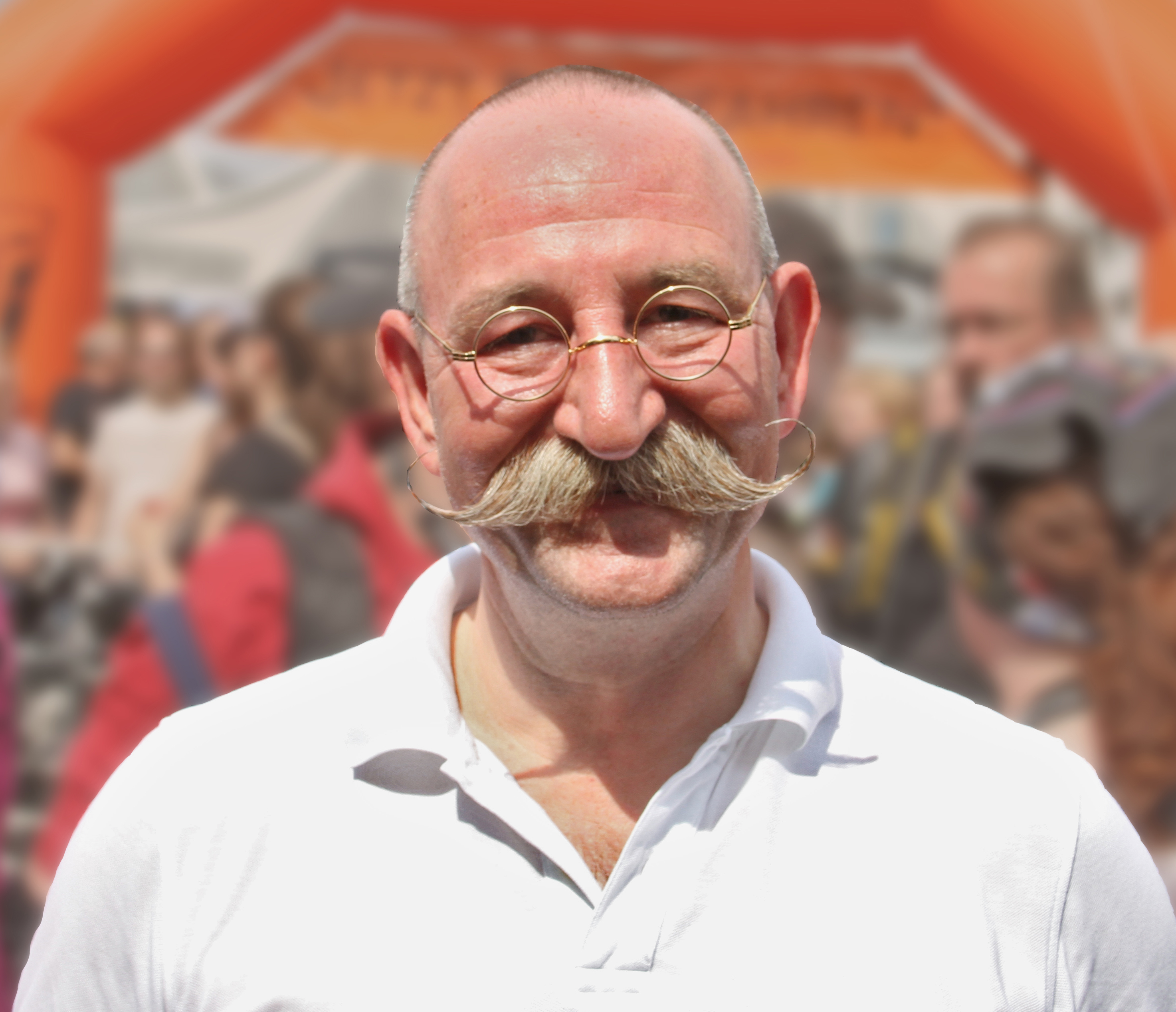
Horst Lichter in 2014

The show was first broadcast on ZDFneo. Further episodes were shown weekly on the fixed broadcasting slot on Sundays at 1:15 p.m. on ZDF. From 18 May 2015, the show received the weekday slot for the discontinued cooking show Topfgeldjäger.

Season	Episodes	Start of broadcast	End of broadcast	Notes
1	6	4 August 2013	8 September 2013	sundays
2	19	5 January 2014	22 June 2014	sundays
3	6	28 September 2014	9 November 2014	sundays
4	51	Januar 18, 2015	11 September 2015	initially on Sundays, from 18 May on weekdays at 3:05 p.m.
5	7	13 September 2015	25 October 2015	weekdays, 3:05 p.m.
6	107	28 December 2015	10 June 2016	weekdays, 3:05 p.m.
7	208	29 August 2016	31 July 2017	weekdays, 3:05 p.m.
8		4 September 2017	not yet known	weekdays, 3:05 p.m.

== Literature ==
- Hannes Burkhardt, Charlotte Bühl-Gramer: Trödelshows im Fernsehen – Geschichte als Ware. In: Public History Weekly 4 (2016) 24. doi:10.1515/phw-2016-6424.
- Horst Lichter, Bernd Imgrund: Bares für Rares: Die spannendsten Geschichten, die interessantesten Objekte, die sensationellsten Gebote. Riva Verlag, 2020, ISBN 3-7453-0822-0.

== International versions ==
Country	Title	Presenter(s)	Channel	Air date	End date
Austria	Bares für Rares Österreich	Willi Gabalier	ServusTV	2020	2020
Croatia	Cash or Trash	Irina Čulinović	Nova TV	1 December 2025	present
France	Affaire conclue	Sophie Davant (2017–2023); Julia Vignali (2024–present)	France 2	21 August 2017	present
Greece	Cash or Trash	Despina Miraraki	Star Channel	21 May 2022	present
Hungary	Kincsvadászok	Attila Till	TV2	22 January 2024	present
Italy	Cash or Trash - Chi offre di più?	Paolo Conticini	NOVE	4 October 2021	present
Morocco	أخر ثمن (Akhir Taman)	Samia Akariou	2M	18 February 2023	present
Netherlands	Cash or Trash	Martien Meiland	SBS6	23 October 2019	14 April 2020
Belgium (Flanders)	Cash or Trash	Martien Meiland	Play5	18 February 2020	31 March 2020
Poland	Łowcy Skarbów. Kto da więcej	Paweł Orleański	TV4	2022	present
Portugal	Negócio Fechado	Tânia Ribas de Oliveira	RTP1	5 October 2026	present
Serbia	Keš ili treš	Tijana Živanović	Nova S	22 September 2025	present
Montenegro	Keš ili treš	Tijana Živanović	Nova M	22 September 2025	present
United Kingdom	The Bidding Room	Nigel Havers	BBC One	2020	2025
