= Norbert Lehmann =

German journalist (born 1960)

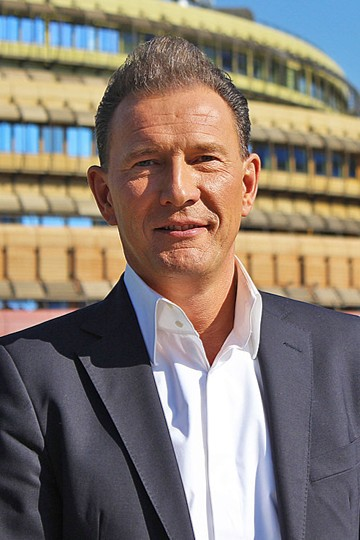
- Lehmann in 2013.
- Born: 29 February 1960 (age 66); Dortmund, North Rhine-Westphalia, Germany
- Education: Westfälische Wilhelms-Universität Munster (PhD, 1986)
- Occupations: Journalist; Television presenter
- Years active: 1985–2025
- Employer: ZDF
- Television: ZDF.reporter (2003–2011); ZDF-Mittagsmagazin (1999–2008)

Norbert Lehmann (born 29 February 1960) is a German former journalist and TV presenter. He is best known for hosting ZDF-Mittagsmagazin from 1999 until 2018.

== Biography ==
Lehmann studied Political Sciences, Marketing and Sociology at the Westfälische Wilhelms-Universität from 1978 until 1985, and gained his Doctorate there in 1986. He first started working in journalism during his studies at the Westfälische Rundschau newspaper and the Westdeutscher Rundfunk radio station.

He joined ZDF in 1985 and became the Editor at the regional studios in Düsseldorf, becoming the PA to Chief Editor Klaus Bresser from 1991 to 1993, when he moved to the studios in Bonn. From 1995 to 2002, he was the head of the regional studios for Hesse in Wiesbaden. His first role hosting ZDF-Mittagsmagazin came in April 1999.

He became the host of the investigative show ZDF.reporter in February 2003 and stayed until its end in March 2011. He hosted ZDF Royal from April 2004 and was a regular commentator for ZDF on the British royal family until his retirement. He co-hosted ZDF's New Year special Willkommen 2011 with Mirjam Weichselbraun for 2010/11. In July 2011, he became the main host of ZDF-Mittagsmagazin, leaving to host the show's sports block in 2018.

Lehmann led ZDF's coverage of the funeral of Prince Philip on 17 April 2021 with Julia Melchior.

Lehmann retired on 1 July 2025, saying in his last piece to camera that it had been "forty wonderful years". He was called a "quasi-ZDF institution" by his co-presenter Mitri Sirin.
