= Bodo Hauser =

German television presenter

Bodo Hugo Hauser (23 February 1946 – 22 July 2004) was a German journalist and writer.

== Life ==
Hauser was born and died in Krefeld.

From 1968 to 1972, Hauser studied at the University of Freiburg, the University of Lausanne, and the University of Bonn. Since 1973 Hauser has worked for the German broadcaster ZDF. Together with German journalist Ulrich Kienzle, he was from 1993 to 2000 co-host of the German talk show Hauser and Kienzle on German broadcaster ZDF. Kienzle and Hauser were the "combattants" in the weekly ZDF political magazine Frontal, which always featured a controversial debate between the more leftist Kienzle (usually taking the position of the Social Democratic Party of Germany) and the more rightist Bodo Hauser (usually taking the position of the Christian Democratic Union of Germany). As a writer, Hauser wrote several books. Hauser was married and had two children.

Hauser died by medical error.

== Awards ==
- 1996: Bambi Award
- 1997: Cross of the Order of Merit of the Federal Republic of Germany

== Works ==
- Hauser, Bodo H.; Kienzle, Ulrich; Reichenberger, Stephan (1997). Noch Fragen, Kienzle? Ja, Hauser! der offizielle deutsche Meinungsführer (in German). München. ISBN 978-3-453-11767-9. OCLC 75879573.
- Hauser, Bodo H.; Kienzle, Ulrich; Reichenberger, Stephan (1999). Total Frontal Sprüche und Widersprüche aus 7 TV-Jahren (in German). München. ISBN 978-3-453-15530-5. OCLC 231785321.
- Hauser, Bodo H.; Kienzle, Ulrich; Reichenberger, Stephan (2001). Küchenkabinett Essen und Trinken bei Rechten und Linken (in German). München. ISBN 978-3-453-18843-3. OCLC 1280853024.
- Hauser, Bodo H.; Kienzle, Ulrich; Reichenberger, Stephan; Friedrich, Dorothea; Hoche, Karl; Seissler, Hanjo (2000). Bitte recht feindlich! : schöner leben und streiten im neuen Jahrtausend (in German). München: Wilhelm Heyne. ISBN 3-453-16497-0. OCLC 50812091.
- Hauser, Bodo H.; Kienzle, Ulrich (1996). Schwarz Rot Geld der offizielle deutsche Marktführer (in German). Hamburg. ISBN 978-3-455-11076-0. OCLC 243840187.
