= ZDF-Fernsehgarten =

- Created by: ZDF
- Presented by: Andrea Kiewel
- Countries of origin: West Germany (1986-1990); Germany (1990-present)
- No. of seasons: 29
- No. of episodes: 16-21, each summer

Production
- Production locations: ZDF Broadcasting Centre; Mainz, Germany
- Running time: 120-135 Minutes

Original release
- Network: ZDF
- Release: 29 June 1986 – present

ZDF-Fernsehgarten (English: ZDF Television garden) is a German entertainment TV show broadcast live from the grounds of the ZDF broadcasting centre at Mainz. It is a seasonal live programme which airs only during the summer months with 16 to 21 episodes being produced. The show is presented by Andrea Kiewel as of 2009.

== History ==
The first ZDF Fernsehgarten was broadcast on 29 June 1986 and was hosted by Ilona Christen who had a trademark of wearing unusual spectacles and a yellow raincoat.

On 17 September 2006, Fernsehgarten celebrated its 20th anniversary. In the 2007 season of the ZDF Fernsehgarten was organised in collaboration with the magazine Yam!. It was also the first time a school band competition was organised which was an integral part of the programme at this time.

On 8 July 2012 a performance by Roland Kaiser was disrupted. Also, two weeks later people were arrested at the show.

At the end of the 2013 summer season by popular demand of viewers it was decided to broadcast ZDF Fernsehgarten throughout the year, this included a new "Fernsehgarten on Tour". The show is rebranded depending upon the season.

Since May 2014 an audio description has been provided for the blind and partially sighted.

On 29 June 2014, the ZDF Fernsehgarten appeared in the Guinness Book of World Records as the longest running live open-air entertainment show. At that time, the programme had run continuously for 28 years. Total airtime to date is 49,507 minutes and 31 seconds and were broadcast live, equivalent to 34 days at a stretch.

During a show in August 2022, where artists such as Zara Larsson and Palina Glebova were set to perform, host Andrea Kiewel hinted to the live audience that she had been instructed to use the ‘gender-specific’ version of nouns (saying Songwriter*innen instead of Songwriter). The ZDF editorial team stated: ‘There is definitely no instruction to use gender in the “ZDF-Fernsehgarten”. Andrea Kiewel is personally concerned to address everyone, which is why she used this formulation in connection with ‘must’.’ Following the media coverage, Kiewel clarified: ‘Nobody, not ZDF and nobody else, is telling me that I have to use gendered language. I've been using the masculine and feminine plural for a long time because I absolutely want to and it's very important to me. It's close to my heart. And that's what I meant in the live programme. It can happen that not every word fits perfectly in a two-hour live programme. But that's the way it is. I want it. I don't have to.’

== ZDF Fernsehgarten on Tour ==
As a result of the high popularity of ZDF Fernsehgarten, the programme went on tour for the spring and winter Sunday broadcasts of 2014 before returning to the open-air studio in Mainz for the summer. Three winter productions took place in Obertauern, Austria, with a fourth special in Kitzbühel featuring Hansi Hinterseer. Further to the tour in spring, the show was broadcast from R2 Hotel Rio Costa Calma in Fuerteventura. In the Autumn of 2014, the show went on tour for one episode live from Schloßberg in Graz and one episode from the Therme Merano spa hotel in Merano, South Tyrol.

In 2015, the show was broadcast on the winter tour for two episodes in Solda, South Tyrol, and St Anton am Arlberg, Tyrol. The show then returned to Mainz for two special episodes based on the 70's, 80's, 90's and pop music before going back on tour for three special episodes live from the beach of Bahia del Duque in Tenerife. In late 2015, Fernsehgarten was on tour in South Tirol and then Gran Canaria in May 2016.
