= ARD 2 =

German television channel, 1961–1963

- Country: Germany
- Broadcast area: West Germany

Programming
- Language: German

Ownership
- Owner: ARD
- Sister channels: ARD

History
- Launched: 1 May 1961; 64 years ago
- Closed: 31 March 1963; 63 years ago
- Replaced by: ZDF

ARD 2 was a provisional television channel operated by ARD as a stop-gap measure until the creation of ZDF. Founded on 1 May 1961 and initially meant to air until 30 June 1962, it ended up extending its lease to 31 March 1963, the eve of ZDF's formal creation. Initially it broadcast in Frankfurt, before subsequently expanding its signal to all of West Germany.

== Background ==
Konrad Adenauer considered radio and television to be "tools of political control" and tried to influence the existing broadcasting system. The goal of the state was to provide a national and international radio station (Deutschlandfunk) as well as a second TV channel, operated under Freies Fernsehen Gesellschaft mbH, which was criticized by politicians as Adenauer-Fernsehen (Adenauer Television) due to its connections to the state. On 30 September 1959, Adenauer's third federal cabinet adopted the Project-Law for Broadcasting. On 25 July 1960, Deutschland-Fernsehen GmbH was founded to exploit the second television network. Subsequently, individual states requested to the Federal Constitutional Court to review the process for the new broadcasting companies, up to the competence of the federal government and each state.

== Decision by the Minister-Presidents of the states ==
In their conference on 17 March 1961, the Minister Presidents of individual West German states decided that ARD should open a second television channel on its own. Initially it was just a mere recommendation, but was implemented at ARD's general assembly on 23 March in Munich. There, it was decided that broadcasts would start on 1 June 1961, but individual regional broadcasters could start operating ahead of schedule. Hessischer Rundfunk (from Frankfurt) opened its second channel a full month before the federal launch, on 1 May 1961.

When full broadcasts began on 1 June 1961, its programming was based on "inter-institutional co-operation": the BR region would receive a ballet performance from Cologne, WDR would broadcast a play from Baden-Baden, HR's region received programs from NDR, NDR's region from HR and so on. The nine regional companies that made up the ARD system criticized the decision, since it relied upon a centralized microwave network that was supposed to be used for FFG, which never launched.

== Broadcasting ==
Unlike ARD, which used VHF, ARD 2 used an all-UHF network, which implied installing a second transmitter compatible for receiving the band. During its first month on air (only in Hesse), viewers received its signal with poor image quality. It was revealed by Der Spiegel that such transmitters, under Bundespost's jurisdiction, were not authorized to operate in this initial phase. That month, HR technicians measured the radius of the Feldberg transmitter: the VHF channel was received in a 400 kilometer radius, while ARD 2 only reached 15 kilometers. This caused uncertainties from both ARD and Bundespost, who did not release preliminary statistics on how many potential television sets — the ones that had UHF antennas — could receive it.

== Programming ==
ARD 2's schedule started at 8pm with a simulcast Tagesschau from the first channel and ended between 10pm and midnight, depending on the day. The channel relayed some magazine programmes from the VHF service, such as Panorama, as well as documentaries and feature films. ARD 2 also served as an alternate platform such as programs such as Sportschau, under the grounds that there was no time for its airing on the first channel due to special programming.

Unlike the practice common on the first channel, only Westdeutscher Rundfunk had its own opt-out on ARD 2. It aired Prisma des Westens, at 7:30pm on working days, before the start of ARD 2's regular programming. WDR delivered its programming on the first channel from 6:40pm to 7:30pm with the magazine Hier und Heute and from 7:30pm to 8pm, it aired series while the second channel was airing Prisma des Westens. Bayerischer Rundfunk had defended the possibility of using an opt-out at the ARD general assembly in March 1961, but did not air its own programming.

The contributions of the nine ARD members differed from those of the first channel. On 1 January 1962, the partition for both channels was as such:

Broadcaster	ARD	ARD 2
WDR	22.5%	30%
NDR	22.5%	22%
BR	17%	15%
SWF	8%	6%
HR	8%	9%
SDR	8%	6%
SFB	8%	7%
SR	3%	2%
RB	3%	3%

ARD 2's coordinator was WDR's television director of programming, Hans Joachim Lange. For the program schedule, the following themes were arranged thusly:

Day	1 June to 31 December 1961	1 January to 30 June 1962
Sunday	Das Panorama; Feature film Sportschau	Das Panorama; Sport
Monday	Feature film Polticial magazine Die Zone hat das Wort	Feature film Quiz shows
Tuesday	Foreign news Entertainment	Foreign news "High level" entertainment
Wednesday	Cultural magazine Experimental programs	Cultural magazine Filmclub; Studiobühne (theatre plays)
Thursday	Entertainment; Crime movie	Each ARD member had its own program
Friday	Entertainment; Game shows	Current affairs programs and documentaries Entertainment
Saturday	Feature film Theatre plays	Game shows

== Closure ==
Since the beginning, ARD 2 was meant to be a provisional channel. It was initially set to close on 30 June 1962, or even earlier, if ZDF started ahead of the date. Due to delays in ZDF's launch, the channel continued broadcasting past the expected cut-off date, shutting down on 31 March 1963. On 1 April 1963, ZDF started broadcasting on the existing ARD 2 network.

ARD remained with only one television channel. Initial expectations for the regional companies to launch their TV channels were not achieved. Bayerisches Fernsehen started broadcasting an independent third channel on 22 September 1964, over a year after ARD 2's closure; the process ended on 5 September 1969 with the launch of Südwest 3.

Until 30 September 1963, WDR's Prisma des Westens broadcast on ZDF's frequencies. It aired on working days from 6:45pm to 7:08pm, which translated into a potential loss of revenue for ZDF. At the initiative of Franz Meyers, Minister President of North Rhine-Westphalia, by airing the regional program continually, its third channel would be launched before his term ended. Westdeutsches Fernsehen started broadcasting on 17 December 1965.

== Bibliography ==
- Heiko Flottau: Hörfunk und Fernsehen heute. Günter Olzog Verlag, Munich 1972, ISBN 3-7892-7048-2
- Klaus Wehmeier: Die Geschichte des ZDF. Hase & Koehler Verlag, Mainz 1979, ISBN 3-7758-0978-3
