= Viktor Worms =

German television presenter and journalist

- Born: 30 August 1959 (age 66)
- Occupations: Radio and television host and producer

Viktor Worms (born 30 August 1959) is a German radio and television host and producer.

== Career ==
Worms was born in Düsseldorf. After graduating from high school Koblenzer Straße in Düsseldorf in 1981, Worms completed a traineeship at Radio Luxembourg. He then worked as an editor and presenter for the station, presenting the Morningshow along with Hugo Egon Balder and Hans Werner Olm. He gained notoriety from 1985 to 1989 as a host of the popular ZDF-Hitparade, which he took over from Dieter Thomas Heck, who has criticised Worms for his handling of the show and for not caring about the German Schlager genre. From October 1990 to September 1991, Worms presented the game show Stadt Land Fluß on the original Tele 5 channel. In addition, he worked since 1988 for the Munich radio Antenne Bayern, first as a presenter, and then as head of entertainment, head of vocal marketing, and head of program planning before becoming deputy program director for that station in 1992. In 1995 he became program director at Antenne Bayern, significantly developing the channel. At the same time he worked as a freelance radio consultant until 1998 (e.g. in Austria / moderation coach for the Bayerische Landeszentrale für neue Medien in Munich).

From 1 December 1998 to 31 August 2001, Worms was head of entertainment for ZDF. In this function he was responsible among others for the production of Wetten, dass..?. In 2002, he was managing director of Dolce Media for ten months, the TV production company of Christoph Gottschalk and Thomas Gottschalk. Since 2003, he has been managing director of MPS Mediconsulting GmbH, which was renamed Worms Mediapartner GmbH in 2004. From 2002 to 2008 he advised the Aktion Mensch. Until 29 March 2008, he produced on behalf of Dolce Media with his company Wetten, dass..?, from 15 July 2008 until the end of 2010 he was editorial director and producer of the ZDF show Willkommen bei Carmen Nebel. Worms was a consultant for Red Bull Media House in 2011. He also collaborated with André Heller on the 2011 show Magnifico.
