= Bild (TV channel) =

Defunct german television channel

- Type: News
- Country: Germany
- Broadcast area: Germany
- Headquarters: Berlin, Germany

Programming
- Language: German

Ownership
- Owner: WeltN24, Axel Springer SE
- Sister channels: Welt, N24 Doku

History
- Launched: 22 August 2021
- Closed: 31 December 2023

Links
- Website: bild.tv

Bild (alternatively also called Bild TV) was a German free-to-air private news TV channel that represented the television arm of the Bild newspaper. It belonged to the WeltN24 broadcasting group, the TV subsidiary of Springer SE, and began broadcasting on 22 August 2021. The program was distributed via German cable networks, Satellit Astra 19.2 E, IPTV and OTT. The station was financed through advertising and the main program was the news format "BILD LIVE".

Bild TV ceased broadcasting on 31 December 2023 on digital content platforms, while some of the programs will still be online.

== License, incorporation and closure ==
The broadcasting license required to start broadcasting as a classic television broadcaster with 24/7 operation was applied for in August 2021. On 24 June 2021 the granting of the broadcasting license was announced. At the end of July 2021, Bild began test operations via Astra. On the satellite Astra 19.2 East on transponder 33 there was an indication of the planned start of transmission.

At the end of 2022, the extensive live broadcasts that was considered the station's trademark was discontinued. From then on, Bild TV focused primarily on documentaries. 80 employees were laid off.

In November 2023 it was announced that the linear TV channel would be discontinued at the end of the year.

The live broadcasts of handball and basketball Bundesliga games are produced in cooperation with DYN and will now be broadcast on Springer station "Welt". The football talk “The Situation of the League” has also been shown on Welt TV since 2024.

Broadcasting stopped on the night from 31 December 2023 to 1 January 2024 and the broadcasting license issued for Bild TV was returned.

== Reception and criticism ==
In an interview with Johannes Nichelmann from Deutschlandfunk Kultur on 22 August 2021, critic Matthias Dell described Bild TV as "empty, poorly produced and boring" and compared the lack of professionalism of Bild TV with "student television or a public access channel". In his television review on 23 August 2021, Alexander Krei from DWDL.de described the start of broadcasting on the Bild television channel as "television without a resting pulse" and complained that Bild "rushed through the program".

ARD program director Christine Strobl announced on 3 October 2021, one week after the 2021 federal election, that she would take legal action against Bild TV because the broadcaster took over the 6 p.m. election forecasts from ARD and ZDF and for minutes the Berlin round from ARD and ZDF had transmitted. She also said about Bild TV that she found "the type of reporting highly problematic: this type of exaggeration, this focus on dividing society and dealing with facts". It is "clearly pursuing one goal: to discredit public service broadcasting in its entirety."
