= Die Knoff-Hoff-Show =

- Genre: Comedy-science
- Developed by: Joachim Bublath
- Presented by: Joachim Bublath, Ramona Leiß, Babette Einstmann, Monica Lierhaus and Kim Fisher
- Opening theme: "Ain’t She Sweet"
- Country of origin: West Germany / Germany
- Original language: German

Original release
- Network: ZDF
- Release: 1986 - 1999; 2002 - 2004

Die Knoff-Hoff-Show was a comedy science TV show on the German public broadcaster ZDF. The original series was broadcast between 1986 and 1999; it returned as Die große Knoff-Hoff-Show in 2002–04. The name is a joke German pronunciation of the English expression know-how.

== Concept ==
The concept of the show was developed in the mid-1980s by Joachim Bublath, a TV presenter trained as a physicist. He was a presenter in all episodes. His co-presenters were Ramona Leiß, Babette Einstmann, Monica Lierhaus and Kim Fisher.

The show explained scientific concepts by means of simple experiments that anyone could replicate. In addition, hobbyists were given the opportunity to present their inventions; these included a pretzel-cutting machine and a foam-throwing machine. Each week, the show included some "crazy" experiments by Knoff-Hoff Professor Charlie (played by Egon Keresztes); these were so absurd, they frequently went wrong.

The Veterinary Street Jazz Band played the theme tune, an interpretation of the 1927 song "Ain’t She Sweet", first recorded by Lou Gold & His Orchestra, at the start and end of the program, and also brief musical interludes between segments.

Die Knoff-Hoff-Show rapidly became one of the most successful science shows on German television. It was dubbed in nine languages and shown on other continents.

== History ==
The show aired for the first time on 16 February 1986 and ended with Episode 79 on 21 March 1999. Beginning in 2002 ZDF broadcast a second series, titled Die große Knoff-Hoff-Show (The Big Knoff-Hoff Show); this ended in December 2004. According to Bublath, it was canceled because it proved impossible to keep up the pace of experiments ("a new experiment every minute").

There were also two special broadcasts in summer 2005 under the title Der Sommer mit Knoff-Hoff (Summer with Knoff-Hoff).

== See also ==
- Bill Nye the Science Guy, an American show
- Brainiac: Science Abuse, a British show
- clever! – Die Show, die Wissen schafft, another German show
