= Horst Lichter =

German cook, television cook, and cookbook author

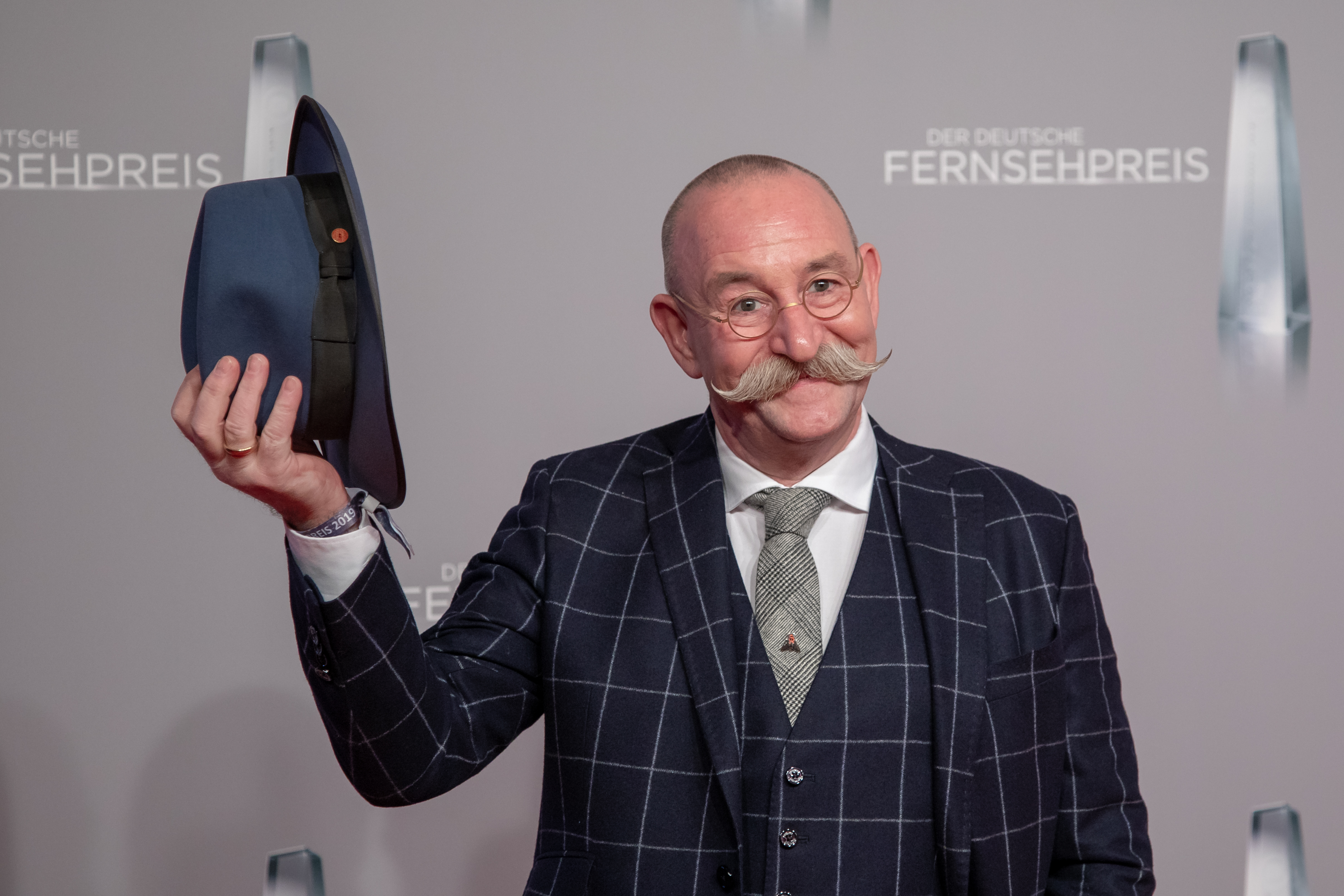
- Lichter in 2019
- Born: Wilhelm Horst Lichter; 15 January 1962 (age 63); Rommerskirchen-Nettesheim, West Germany
- Occupations: Cook; author; TV presenter
- Partner: Nada Lichter
- Children: 4 (1 deceased)
- Website: horst-lichter.de

Wilhelm Horst Lichter (born 15 January 1962) is a German cook, television cook, cookbook author, and television presenter. He also occasionally appears on stage as an entertainer.

== Life and career ==
Lichter was born on 15 January 1962 in Rommerskirchen-Nettesheim, North Rhine-Westphalia.

He grew up as the eldest son of the miner Anton Lichter and his wife Margret Lichter, nee Heikamp, in the Rhenish lignite district in Gill, a district of Rommerskirchen. He attended a Hauptschule and did bodybuilding as a teenager. At the age of fourteen he began a three-year apprenticeship as a chef with Lutz Winter in the "Alte Post" hotel and restaurant in Bergheim. He chose the profession of cook because he had very positive associations with eating together at the table. He is well known from the German talk and cook show Lafer! Lichter! Lecker! which he moderated together with Johann Lafer and Bares für Rares.

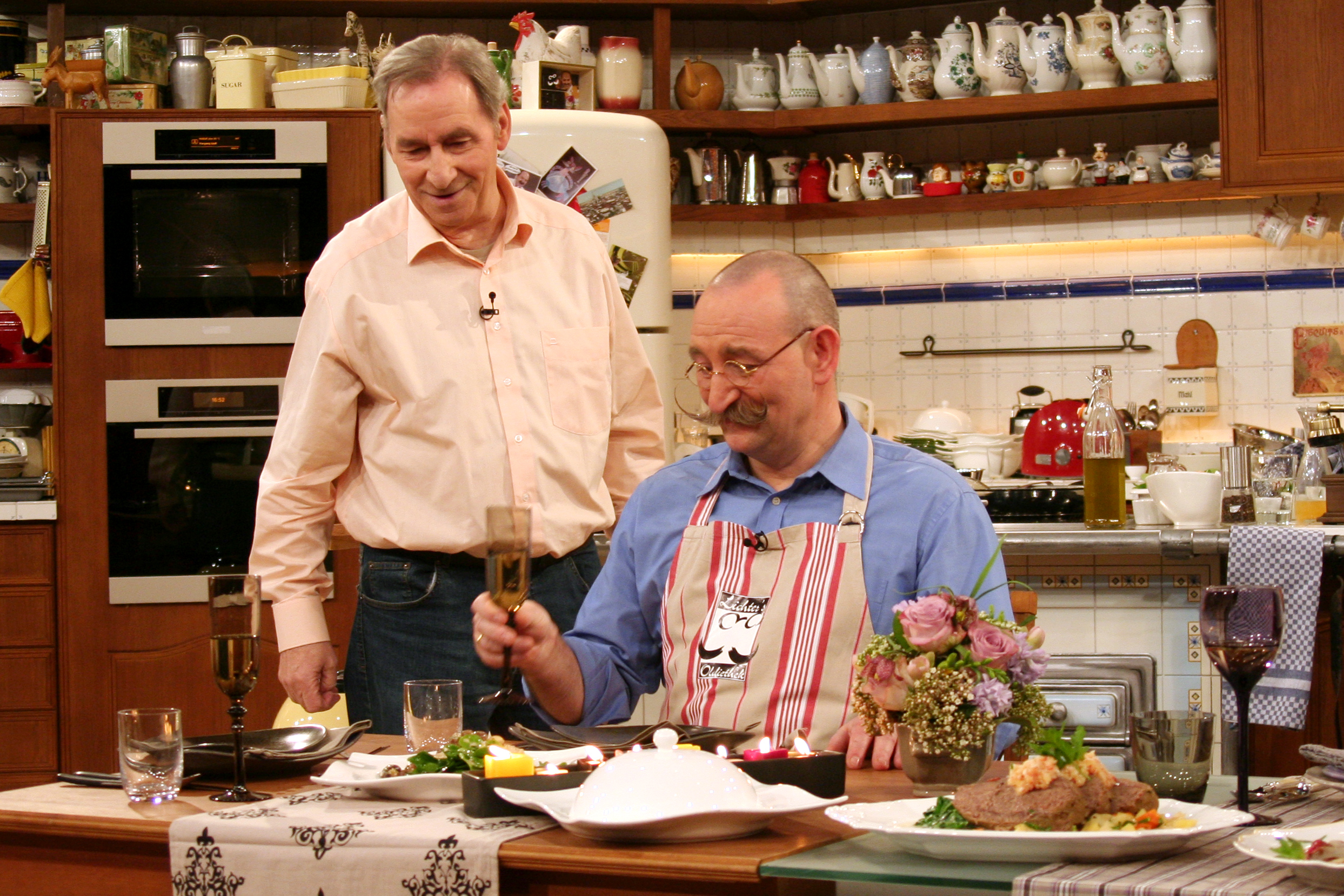
Lichter (right) with Henry van Lyck in the show Lafer! Lichter! Lecker!

== Personal life ==
Lichter has three children from his first marriage; one of them died as an infant. Another relationship resulted in a daughter. He is married for the third time with Nada Lichter and lived in Badenweiler for eight years, and moved to Cologne in 2020.

Lichter is very interested in motorcycles and cars, especially antique cars and modern classic cars.

== Publications (selection) ==
- Lichters Jahreszeitenküche, 2002, ISBN 3-8025-1506-4.
- Lafer! Lichter! Lecker! (mit Johann Lafer), 2007, ISBN 3-89883-150-7.
- Genießen erlaubt! Die gute alte Küche neu entdeckt, 2006, ISBN 3-89479-328-7.
- Großmutters geheime Rezepte. Aufgedeckt und aufgetischt, 2005, ISBN 3-8025-1667-2.
- Alles in Butter. Rezepte zum Glücklichsein. Goldmann, München 2007, ISBN 978-3-442-39172-1.
- Sushi ist auch keine Lösung (DVD, live comedy and cook programm) 2008.
- Hier bin ich Mensch: Geschichten, die vom Leben erzählen, Mosaik-Verlag, 2014, ISBN 978-3-442-39173-8.
- Wer hier klaut, stirbt: Horst Lichters Geschichten von tausendundeinem Leben, Goldmann, 2014, ISBN 978-3-442-17090-6.
- Die Lust am Kochen! Da ist sie wieder!, Gräfe und Unzer-Verlag GmbH, 2015, ISBN 978-3-8338-4540-6.
- Keine Zeit für Arschlöcher! … hör auf dein Herz, Gräfe und Unzer-Verlag GmbH, 2016, ISBN 978-3-8338-5763-8.

== Literature ==
- Markus Lanz: Und plötzlich guckst du bis zum lieben Gott. Die zwei Leben des Horst Lichter. Gütersloh 2007, ISBN 978-3-579-06459-8.
