= Ulrich Kienzle =

German journalist and author (1936–2020)

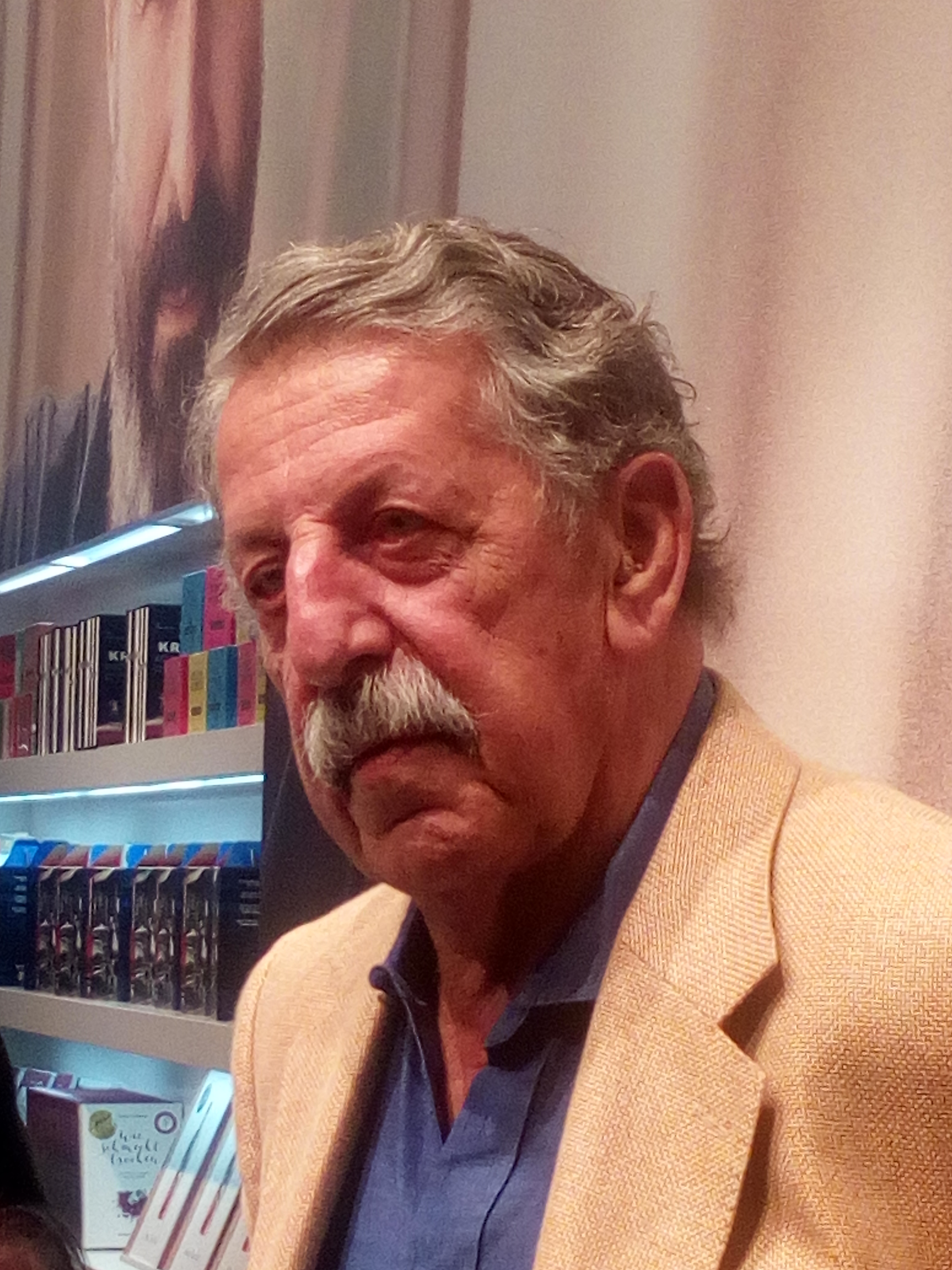
- Kienzle in 2017
- Born: 9 May 1936; Neckargröningen, Württemberg, Germany
- Died: 16 April 2020 (aged 83); Wiesbaden, Germany
- Education: LMU Munich; University of Tübingen
- Occupations: Journalist; Writer
- Organizations: Süddeutscher Rundfunk; ARD; Radio Bremen; ZDF
- Awards: Order of Merit of the Federal Republic of Germany; BAMBI

Ulrich Kienzle (German: [ˈʊlrɪç ˈkiːntslə]; 9 May 1936 – 16 April 2020) was a German journalist and author. He was known for specializing in the politics and culture of the Middle East. He worked for several broadcasters, including German public television networks ARD and ZDF. He was one of the few Western journalists to interview Muammar Gaddafi in the 1970s. In 1990, he was the last western journalist who interviewedSaddam Hussein, days before Gulf War started. Kienzle was known for appearing on Frontal, a ZDF series of political discussions also featuring broadcast journalist Bodo Hugo Hauser. He was one of the most famous journalists in the six German-speaking countries.

== Life ==
Kienzle was born in Neckargröningen, Württemberg, today part of Baden-Württemberg in southwest Germany. He was 9 years old when World War II ended and 13 when the Federal Republic of Germany was founded. Kienzle earned a university degree in political science (with minors in German studies and history of art), studying at LMU Munich and the University of Tübingen with Theodor Eschenburg from 1956 to 1963.

From 1956 to 1967, he worked first as a freelancer, then beginning in 1963 as a permanent contributing editor of the Abendschau ("Evening News") of the Stuttgart-based regional broadcaster Süddeutscher Rundfunk (SDR). After a stint working for Westdeutscher Rundfunk (WDR) in 1967 and 1968, he returned to SDR, becoming lead anchor of the Abendschau from 1968. From 1972 to 1974, he was co-host and co-editor of Kompass, a joint foreign affairs broadcast of SDR and Bayerischer Rundfunk (BR).

In 1974, Kienzle started working for the national public broadcaster ARD as a correspondent, from 1974 to 1977 covering the Middle East and stationed in Beirut. He was among the first journalists to interview Muammar Gaddafi, then a young rebel. From 1977 to 1980, he was ARD's correspondent for Southern Africa. From 1980 to 1990, he was chief editor of North German regional broadcaster Radio Bremen (RB).

From 1990 to 1993, Kienzle was chief editor for foreign affairs at Hessischer Rundfunk (Hessian Broadcasting) and anchor for Zweites Deutsches Fernsehen (ZDF), presenting the foreign affairs magazine Auslandsjournal. In this position, in 1990 he was one of the few Western journalists allowed to interview Iraqi dictator Saddam Hussein. From 1993 to 2000, he was one of the "combatants" in the weekly ZDF political magazine Frontal, which always featured a controversial debate between the more leftist Kienzle, usually taking the position of the Social Democratic Party of Germany (SPD), and the more rightist Bodo Hugo Hauser, usually taking the position of the Christian Democratic Union of Germany (CDU).

In the 2000s, Kienzle hosted a ZDF program on German political campaigns in the run-up to the 2002 federal election, and beginning in 2003 contributed to a ZDF broadcast 'magazine' on the economy (WISO). He was interviewed on events in the Middle East, such as the Iraq War, the War in Afghanistan and the Arab Spring revolts.

Kienzle died in Wiesbaden, Hesse, on 16 April 2020, aged 83.

== Honours ==
- 1977: Order of Merit of the Federal Republic of Germany (15 November 1976), for reports from the Lebanese civil war
- 1983: Eduard Rhein Prize, award for "outstanding achievements in research and/or development in the areas of radio, television and information technology", Culture Prize for the report Blutiger Sommer – Wiedersehen mit Beirut
- 1995: BAMBI, German media prize, together with Hauser
- 2004: Journalistenpreis des Deutschen Mittelstandes ("journalist prize of the German Mittelstand"), for critical journalism on bargain hunters

== Publications ==
Kienzle's publications are held by the German National Library, including:

- Südafrika. Weiße in der Wagenburg. Droemer Knaur, München 1985, ISBN 3-426-04002-6. ("South Africa. Whites in the wagon fort").
- Noch Fragen, Kienzle? Ja, Hauser! Der offizielle deutsche Meinungsführer. Hofmann & Campe, Hamburg 1995, ISBN 3-455-11075-4 (together with Bodo H. Hauser). ("Any more questions, Kienzle? Yes, Hauser! The official German opinion guide").
- SchwarzRotGeld. Der offizielle deutsche Marktführer. Hoffmann & Campe, Hamburg 1997, ISBN 3-455-11076-2 (together with Bodo H. Hauser). ("Black-Red-Gold. The official German guidebook on the market")
- Total Frontal. Sprüche und Widersprüche aus 7 TV-Jahren. Heyne, München 1999, ISBN 3-453-15530-0 (together with Bodo H. Hauser). ("Totally head-on. Quotations and controversies from seven years on TV").
- Bitte recht feindlich! Schöner leben und streiten im neuen Jahrtausend. Heyne, München 2000, ISBN 3-453-16497-0 (together with Bodo H. Hauser). ("Please be quite hostile! Better living and debating in the new millennium").
- Küchenkabinett. Essen und Trinken bei Rechten und Linken. Heyne, München 2001, ISBN 3-453-18843-8 (together with Bodo H. Hauser). ("Kitchen Cabinet. Eating and drinking with rightists and leftists.")
- Wo kommsch denn Du alds Arschloch her? Die Erfindung des Schwaben; wie er wurde, was er ist; ein Essay. Edition Sagas, Stuttgart 2008, ISBN 978-3-9812510-9-8 (mit Audio-CD). (an essay on the cultural history of the Swabian people).
- Abschied von 1001 Nacht. Mein Versuch, die Araber zu verstehen. Edition Sagas, Stuttgart 2011, ISBN 978-3-9812510-7-4. ("A farewell to A Thousand and One Nights. My attempt to understand the Arabs").
