= ZDF-Hitparade =

- Presented by: Dieter Thomas Heck (1969–1984); Viktor Worms (1985–1990); Uwe Hübner (1990–2000)
- Country of origin: Germany
- Original language: German

Original release
- Network: ZDF
- Release: 18 January 1969 – 16 December 2000

The ZDF-Hitparade, or Hitparade for short, is a German television series presenting mostly Schlager music. From 1969 to 1984 the presenter was Dieter Thomas Heck. The last show was aired on 16 December 2000.

== History ==
The music show was developed by Truck Branss and Dieter Thomas Heck and first broadcast on January 18, 1969. The original theme song was written in 1968 by James Last and remained a hallmark of the show until the last show of host Dieter Thomas Heck on December 15, 1984.

The first host was Dieter Thomas Heck, who presented once a month on Saturday at 7:30 pm. Various performers sang their current songs, predominantly Schlager. Whereas the first show was produced in the studio, subsequent events were live. Heck was replaced by Viktor Worms in 1985, who was then succeeded by Uwe Hübner in 1990. The programme's cancellation was announced in October 2000, with the last episode airing on 16 December 2000.

== Idea ==
When the show was conceived by Dieter Thomas Heck, he established some innovations to the Schlager genre, which already had adapted a somewhat conservative reputation compared to the current musical trends of the time. Among those innovations was the rule that each singer had to present his or her song live (to music from half-playback). Earlier musical TV-shows had already switched to full-playback. Also, with the exception of the pilot, each episode was live, which also was unusual. Another innovation of Hitparade was the stage design. All earlier musical shows in German television had a somewhat theatre-like design which created a huge distance between singer and audience. Also, their stage design was quite opulent with heavy decorations and curtains. Singing at the Hitparade in contrast meant that the audience sat all around the singer while the stage design was a modern latticework of chrome and steel.

The most important innovation introduced by Heck was that the audience members had the chance to assert influence in the choice of musical artists. The viewers could select their favorite acts by postcard, which were then allowed to return in the subsequent broadcast. One artist got the chance to come back on subsequent shows with one song, twice.

== Awards ==
- 1971: Goldene Kamera in the category Beste Sendung für junge Leute (best television show for young people)
- 1972: Achievement Award of "Record World" for the most popular live show of Europe
- 1973: Goldene Europa of Europawelle Saar (now SR 1 Europawelle), Saarländischer Rundfunk
