= Sankt Stefan im Rosental =

- Municipality
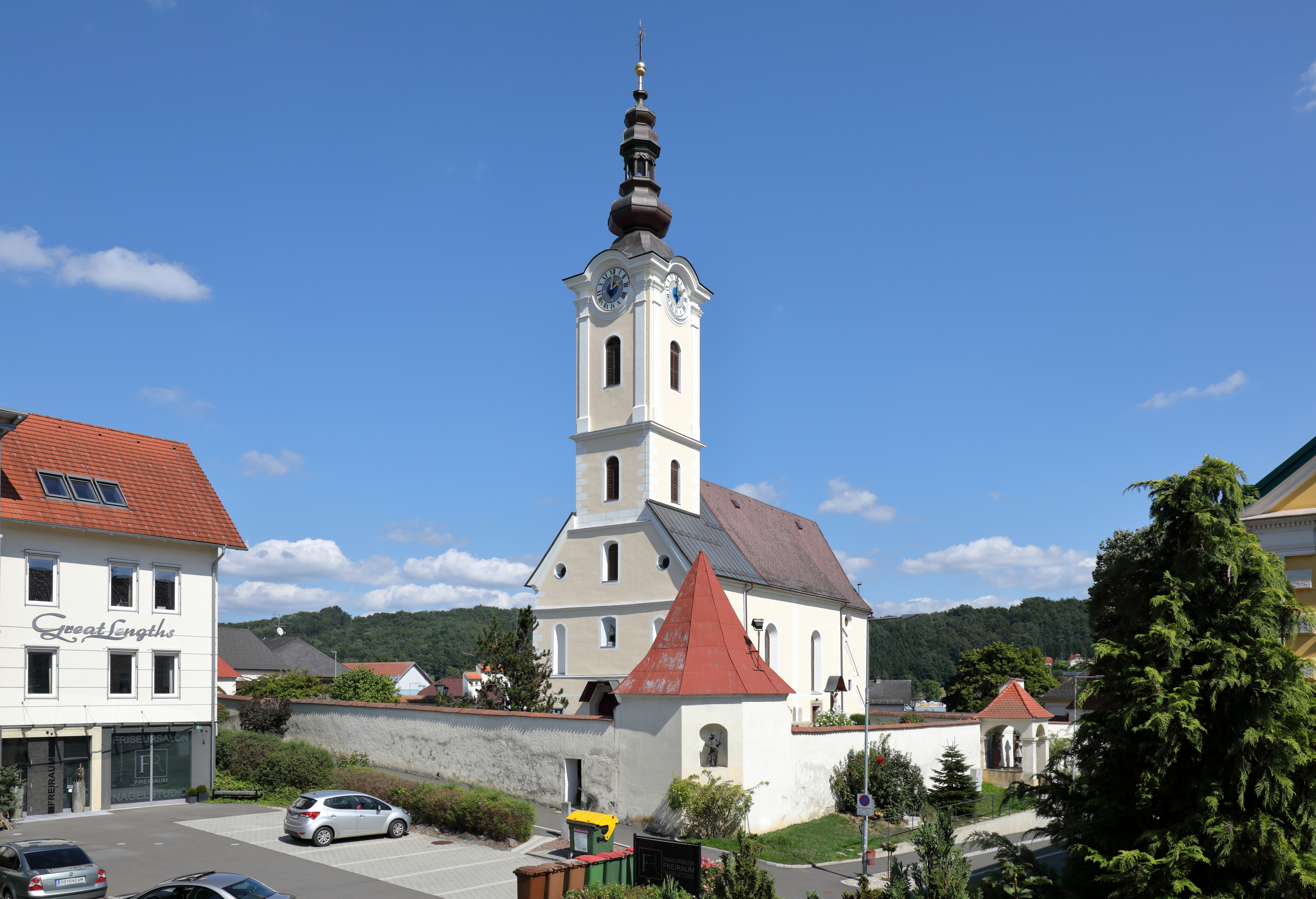

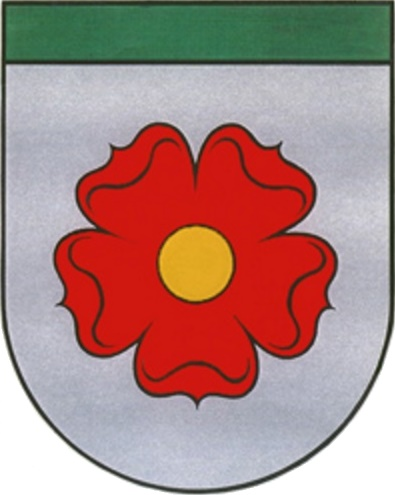
- Coat of arms

- Location within Austria
- Coordinates: 46°54′00″N 15°44′00″E
- Country: Austria
- State: Styria
- District: Südoststeiermark

Government
  - Mayor: Johann Kaufmann (ÖVP)

Area
  - Total: 43.02 km^{2} (16.61 sq mi)
- Elevation: 330 m (1,080 ft)

Population (2018-01-01)
  - Total: 3,947
  - Density: 91.75/km^{2} (237.6/sq mi)
- Time zone: UTC+1 (CET)
  - Summer (DST): UTC+2 (CEST)
- Postal code: 8083
- Area code: +43 3116
- Vehicle registration: SO
- Website: www.st.stefan.at

Sankt Stefan im Rosental is a municipality in the district of Südoststeiermark in the Austrian state of Styria.

== People ==
- Johann Lafer (born 1957), Austrian chef

== Population ==
Historical population
Year	Pop.	±%
1869	2,888	—
1880	2,992	+3.6%
1890	3,249	+8.6%
1900	3,186	−1.9%
1910	3,380	+6.1%
1923	3,242	−4.1%
1934	3,241	−0.0%
1939	3,211	−0.9%
1951	3,270	+1.8%
1961	3,262	−0.2%
1971	3,538	+8.5%
1981	3,697	+4.5%
1991	3,691	−0.2%
2001	3,836	+3.9%
2013	3,779	−1.5%
