= Freies Fernsehen Gesellschaft =

Freies Fernsehen Gesellschaft (FFG, lit. 'Free Television Society') was a planned multi-regional private television network, which would be the second television channel in West Germany. Formed in 1958, it sought to begin transmission from 1 January 1961, but its launch was blocked under legal grounds. Due to concerns over its connections with the German State, it was nicknamed Adenauer-Fernsehen (Adenauer Television).

== Background ==
The idea behind FFG was based upon Konrad Adenauer's plan to give radio and television broadcasts to the responsibility of each state upon the end of the war. ARD was founded in 1950; during the 1950s, the Adenauer cabinet believed that its staff supported then-opposition party SPD (CDU/CSU was still in power). His suspicions were confirmed when, in 1957, his party won the election through critical reports and decided to establish a television station in order not to damage the party's image.

The plan began to take shape in 1956, when the industry (Federation of German Industries) and brand federations made their first studies concerning radio and television advertising. Lobbyists predicted that television would serve as an additional source of revenue.

On 5 December 1958, a group of investors formed Freies Fernsehen GmbH in Frankfurt; on 8 December 1959, State Secretary Felix von Eckardt granted the company a DM 20 million warranty. This became a sum of DM 124 million which was never allocated for federal funding. Fifteen companies, led by Deutsche Bank, agreed to supply FFG with relevant investment. British and American consultancy took place in Munich in 1960 with the aim of preparing programmes for the new channel. Ernest Bornemann was appointed its director of programming. News of its development caused ARD to lose some names: among them was Peter von Zahn, NDR and WDR reporter to the United States since 1955, who still had a contract with the public broadcaster. As punishment for breach of contract, he had to give DM 200,000 back and had to produce Windrose for ARD. Professor Heinz Haber, also from WDR, and future ZDF political commentarist Gerhard Löwenthal, were mooted, but not fully hired.

== Programmes ==
Programming was prepared during 1960; filmmaker Artur Brauner (CCC) envisioned the creation of light entertainment through comedy series, using the CCC facilities in West Berlin and founding the Berliner TV-Union for this end. Werner Höfer's Sunday political discussion programme Der internationale Frühschoppen (The International Brunch), on air since 1953, moved to FFG as Im Kreuzfeuer (In the Crossfire) and would air in the same timeslot (at noon). FFG also had a more ambitious goal for news and current affairs programmes, which would dominate 36% of the weekly schedule - compared to ARD's 24.3%. Its equivalent to Tagesschau would have been Weltschau (Worldview).

== Legal action ==
The governments of Lower Saxony, Hesse, Hamburg and Bremen, led by SPD, all took the FFG plan to the Federal Court to disable FFG's planned launch on 1 January 1961. Finally, on 28 February 1961, the Second Senate considered Deutschland-Fernsehen GmbH, the operating company behind the new channel, to be against the constitution. The government announced that the second channel should be given to the state in accordance with the Constitution of Germany, this would eventually become ZDF. Conrad Adenauer had to approve the channel as being ahead of East Germany, which planned a second channel that would also cover West Germany. However, in the September elections, CDU/CSU lost its majority.

In the interim, some regions, mainly in the NDR and WDR areas, received a stop-gap service known as ARD 2. This network closed on 31 March 1963; ZDF launched on the following day. The failure of Adenauer's plan led to a reshape in the West German television landscape, as the new network caused a conflict with ARD members and state governments. As compensation, the nine ARD broadcasters began broadcasting their third channels with regional programming, launching on a staggered basis from 1964 to 1969.
