= ZDF =

German public-service television broadcaster

- Logo used since 2001
- Country: Germany
- Broadcast area: Germany, reaching bordering regions via overspill of the German terrestrial network
- Headquarters: Mainz, Germany; 49°57′52″N 8°12′29″E

Programming
- Language: German
- Picture format: 1080p HDTV; (downscaled to 720p for digital satellite and cable)

Ownership
- Key people: Norbert Himmler (director)
- Sister channels: ZDFneo; ZDFinfo

History
- Launched: 1 April 1963; 63 years ago
- Replaced: ARD 2 (1961–1963)

Links
- Website: www.zdf.de

Availability

Terrestrial
- Digital terrestrial television: Varies by location

Streaming media
- ZDF.de: Watch live (Germany only)
- FilmOn: Watch live
- ZiggoGO: ZiggoGO.TV
- Canaldigitaal Live App: Watch Live

ZDF (German: [ˌtsɛt.deːˈʔɛf]), short for Zweites Deutsches Fernsehen (German: [ˈtsvaɪtəs ˈdɔʏtʃəs ˈfɛʁnzeːn]; lit. 'Second German Television'), is a German public-service television broadcaster based in Mainz, Rhineland-Palatinate. Launched on 1 April 1963, it is run as an independent nonprofit institution, and was founded by all federal states of Germany (Bundesländer). ZDF is financed by television licence fees and advertising revenues.

The broadcaster is well known for its famous programmes heute, a newscast established in 1963, and Wetten, dass..?, an entertainment show that premiered in 1981, with a suspension from 2014 to 2021. Norbert Himmler, ZDF's director general, was elected by the ZDF Television Council in 2021.

== History ==
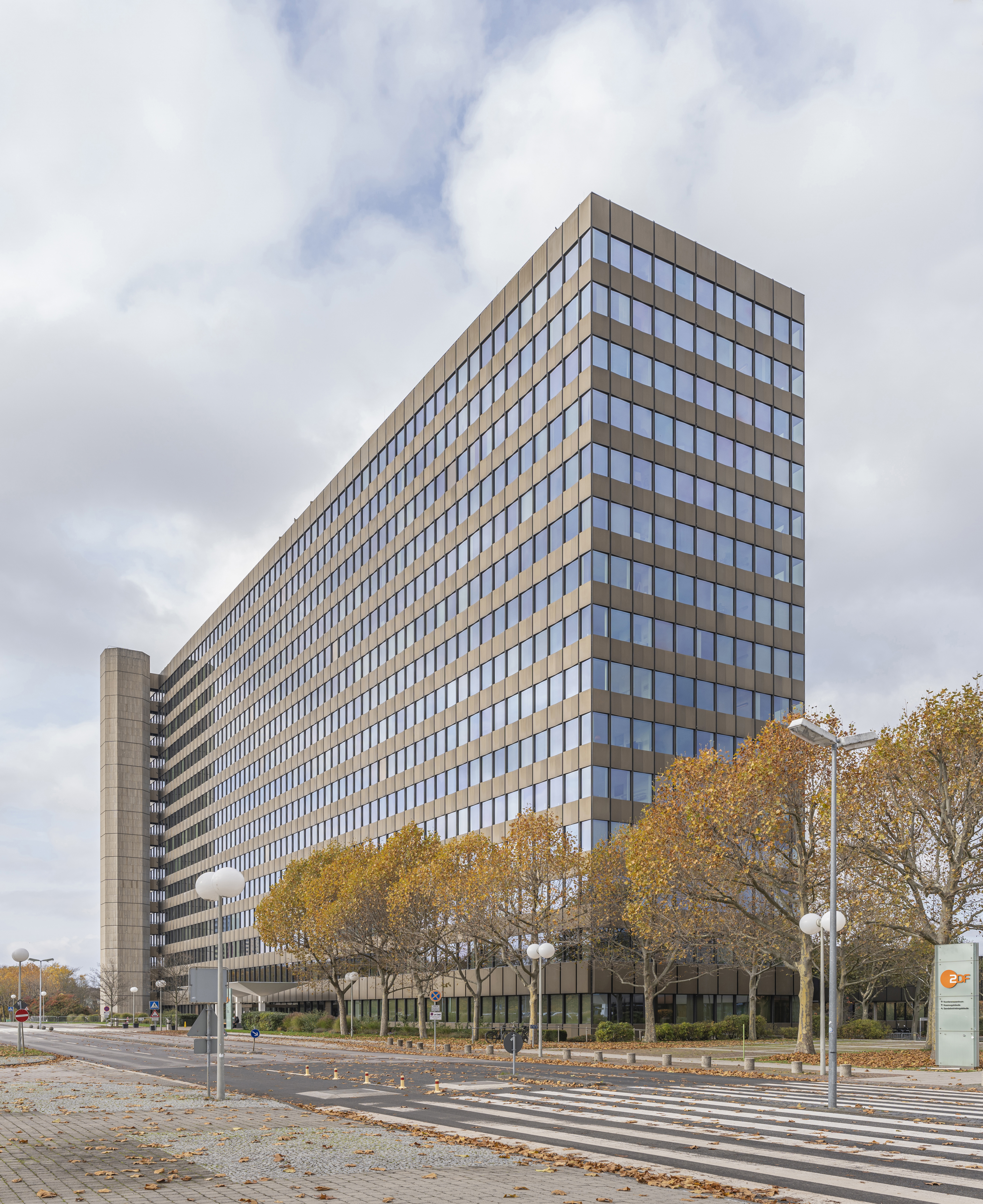
The ZDF administrative headquarters in Mainz

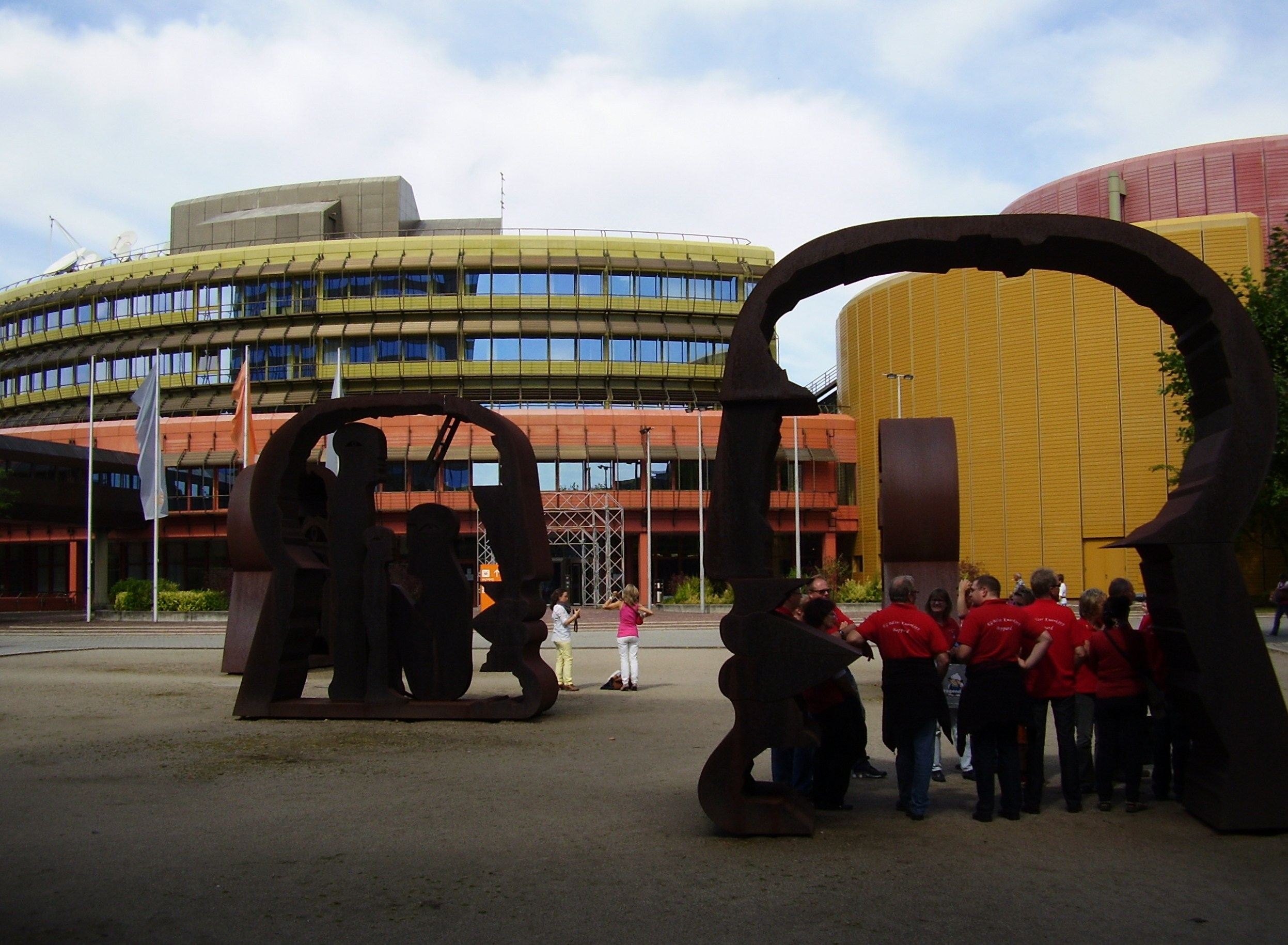
The ZDF broadcasting centre in Mainz

Historic logos

In 1959, the third cabinet of Chancellor Konrad Adenauer began preparations to form a second nationwide television network with the intention of competing with ARD. Adenauer perceived ARD's news coverage to be too critical of his government, and believed that two of the organizations primarily responsible for its news reporting – the Deutsche Presse-Agentur and Nordwestdeutscher Rundfunk, which produced the nightly Tagesschau – were too close to the opposition Social Democratic Party (SPD) to ever be able to report neutrally on his CDU/CSU government. The new television company called the Freies Fernsehen Gesellschaft (Free Television Society) but derisively called Adenauer-Fernsehen (Adenauer's television) by critics, was founded on 25 July 1960.

The Deutsche Bundespost began constructing a second transmitter network on UHF channels, which required new reception equipment. For older receivers, a converter was sold for about 80 DM (equivalent to €195 in 2021). As with the earlier ARD television network, the location of the transmitters was carefully planned to ensure the entire country would be able to receive the programming.

To test the transmitters and encourage the public to purchase UHF receivers, the federal government allowed the ARD network to create a temporary secondary channel, ARD 2, which was broadcast daily from 8 to 10 p.m. ARD 2 began broadcasting on 1 May 1961 in the transmission area of Hessischer Rundfunk and a month later expanded nationwide.

=== Interstate agreement ===
The SPD-led states of Hamburg, Bremen, Lower Saxony, and Hesse appealed to the Federal Constitutional Court of Germany, which on 28 February 1961 in the First Broadcasting Judgment blocked the plan. While building and maintaining telecommunications infrastructure, such as television transmitters, is a responsibility of the federal government under article 87f of the Basic Law, the constitution does not extend these duties to running a television or radio broadcaster. Under Article 30, any power or duty not explicitly assigned to the federal government is reserved for the states. Therefore, the court ruled only the states had the right to set up a television broadcaster. (Conversely, the same decision supported new longwave broadcaster Deutschlandfunk, which had been established by the federal government in November 1960; its focus was on external broadcasting and therefore under the federal government's remit to conduct foreign relations.)

After this decision, in March 1961, the states decided to establish a central nonprofit public television network independently of Adenauer's effort. On 6 June 1961, the state premiers signed at a premiers' conference in Stuttgart the interstate agreement on the "establishment of the public institution Second German Television". On 1 December 1961, though not all states had ratified the agreement, it went into force in the states that had done so (Baden-Württemberg, North Rhine-Westphalia, Rhineland-Palatinate). The last state, Bavaria, filed the instrument of ratification on 9 July 1962.

=== Launch ===
The station began broadcasting from Eschborn near Frankfurt am Main on 1 April 1963, with a speech by the first director general (Intendant), Karl Holzamer. The channel broadcast its first programme in colour in 1967. In 1974, ZDF moved its base of operations to Mainz-Lerchenberg, after briefly being located in Wiesbaden.

Because the network could only offer advertising for 20 minutes during the hours of 6pm to 8pm, it concentrated on entertaining programs that would attract many viewers, unlike ADF's focus on news and documentaries. By the early 1970s its audience share was as high as 90%.

In November 1995, ZDF signed an agreement with American NBC News to share news-gathering resources.

Since 5 October 1996, ZDF has broadcast 24 hours a day.

== Finances ==
ZDF is financed by a license fee of €18.36 per month, which must be paid by all households in Germany except handicapped people and persons on social aid. ZDF shares the income with ARD and Deutschlandradio. The fees are not collected directly by ZDF but by the Beitragsservice (commonly known by its former name, GEZ), an organization comprising the ARD member broadcasters, ZDF, and Deutschlandradio. ZDF also receives income from sponsorships, programming and advertising sales.

== Transmission and reception ==
=== Terrestrial ===
As ZDF is a station, not a network, the station is broadcast throughout Germany, with no regional variations or affiliates, using a number of signal repeaters. ZDF transmitters broadcast a digital signal. Analog signals were gradually phased out, a process which lasted from 2002 to 2008. ZDF does not run any transmitters itself. Throughout the analogue days, all ZDF transmitters were run by the Deutsche Bundespost which was later privatised as Deutsche Telekom's subsidiary T-Systems Media Broadcast. (This is in contrast to the other public German broadcaster, ARD, which owns its main transmitters.) ZDF was not previously allowed to use ARD's transmitters. ZDF has used both ARD and Telekom transmitters since changes to the law in the 1990s, and since the digital switchover.

=== Cable ===
ZDF has also been relayed by cable since the days of the first cable pilot projects.

=== Satellite ===
The first Europe-wide satellite broadcast via Astra 1C began in August 1993 during the Internationale Funkausstellung Berlin (IFA – "International Broadcasting Exhibition") in Berlin. In the same decade, these new technologies were used to enable digital broadcasting of ZDF. Today, ZDF is available free-to-air throughout Europe on Astra 19.2°E.

== Other channels ==
ZDF operates two digital channels: ZDFneo (aimed at 18- to 45-year-olds) and ZDFinfo (documentaries). Both are transmitted in HD. A commercial subsidiary called ZDF Studios GmbH manages programme sales, acquisitions, international coproductions, and a growing number of important activities in new media. ZDF Enterprises owns a Dutch TV production and distribution company, Off the Fence. ZDF also operates various channels in cooperation with other networks: Arte, 3sat, KI.KA, and Phoenix.

In March 2026, as part of a reform treaty between the two broadcasters, it was announced that ARD and ZDF would merge their respective news, documentary, and young adult channels into joint ventures in 2027, with Phoenix and ZDF's Info and Neo being the surviving entities.

== Design ==
ZDF's animated station-identity mascots, the Mainzelmännchen (a play on the words "Mainz" and "Heinzelmännchen"), created by Wolf Gerlach for the channel's launch in 1963, quickly became popular and are still shown between commercials. In 1976, Otl Aicher, a graphic designer, created ZDF's corporate design. A new design for ZDF was created by Lee Hunt in February 2000.

== Administration ==
=== Director general ===
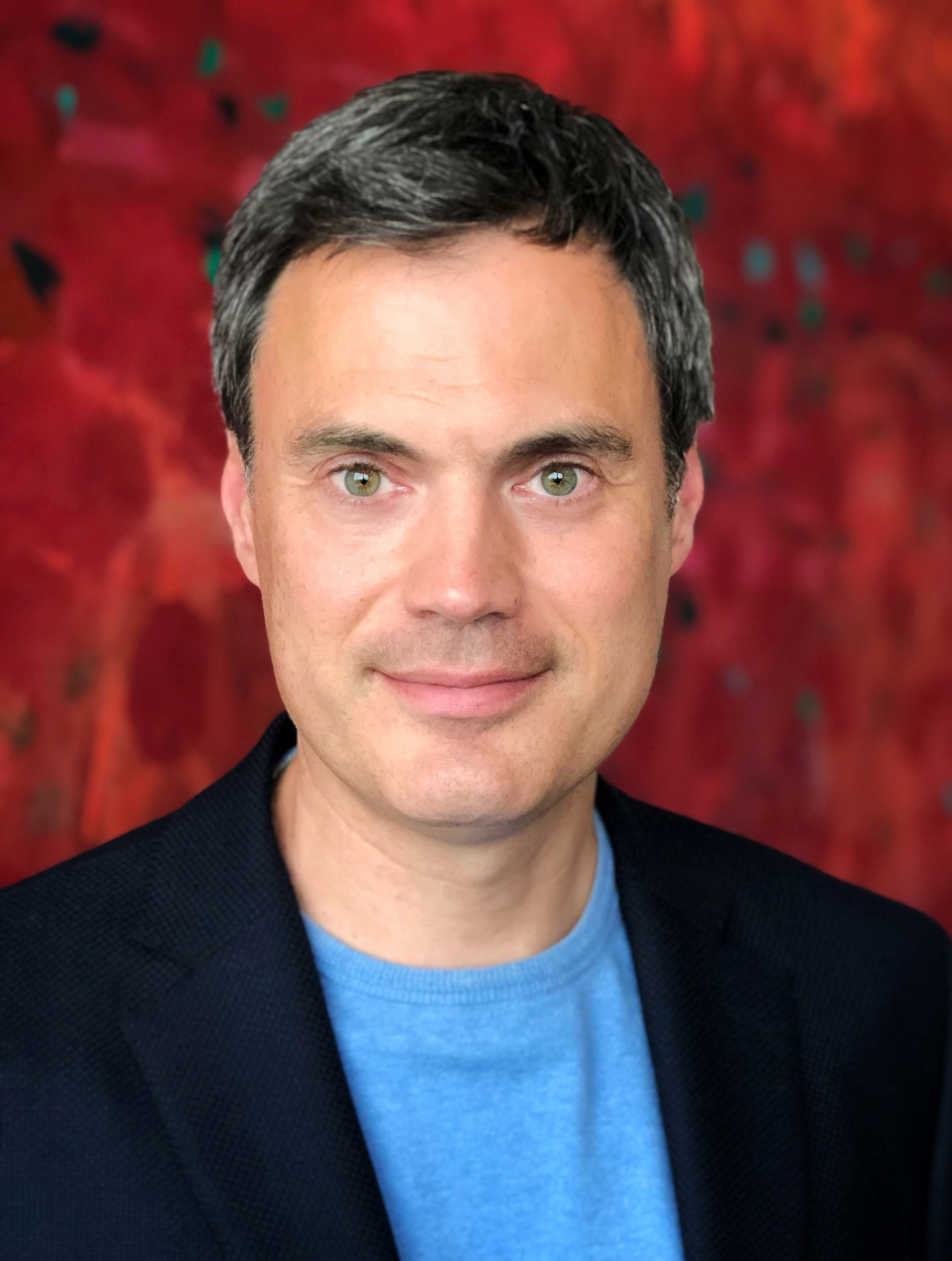
Norbert Himmler

Administratively, ZDF is headed by a director general (Intendant), who is elected by the ZDF Television Council, the composition of which is in turn determined by "societally relevant groups" named in the ZDF Treaty.

Directors General since the start of ZDF:

- 1963–1977: Karl Holzamer
- 1977–1982: Karl-Günther von Hase
- 1982–2002: Dieter Stolte
- 2002–2012: Markus Schächter
- 2012–2022: Thomas Bellut
- 2022–present: Norbert Himmler

=== Supervising board ===
The supervising board supervises the work of the intendant. They pay special attention to the budget. The supervising board has 14 members:

- Five representatives of the federal states
- One representative of the federal republic of Germany
- Eight independent members (not allowed to work for the government or other public entities)

=== Television board ===
The Television Board supervises ZDF and authorizes the budget. They also elect the Director General. The board has 60 members:

- Sixteen representatives of the states of Germany
- Two representatives of the federal republic of Germany
- Two representatives of the Protestant churches
- Two representatives of the Catholic Church
- One representative of the Central Council of Jews in Germany
- 21 representatives of selected civil society groups
- 16 members nominated by the federal states, representing different social causes

== Membership ==
ZDF became a full member of the European Broadcasting Union in 1963. It also has numerous individual cooperation agreements with broadcasters around the world. ZDF is a supporter of the Hybrid Broadcast Broadband TV initiative which promotes the establishment of an open European standard for hybrid set-top boxes for the reception of broadcast TV and broadband multimedia applications with a single user interface.

== Programming ==
=== Children ===
- Zu Gast Bei Paulchens Trickverwandten (1973-1983)
- 1, 2 oder 3 (1977–present)
- ALF (1988–1993)
- Alfred J. Kwak (1990–2003)
- Die Kinder von Bullerbü (Alla vi barn i Bullerbyn)
- Dog City (1995–1997)
- Fraggle Rock (Die Fraggles) (1983–1995)
- Fun with Claude (2009–2015)
- H_{2}O: Just Add Water (2006–2010)
- Hals über Kopf (1987–1993, 1997)
- Löwenzahn (1981–present)
- Pablo the Little Red Fox (1999–2003)
- Pingu (1990–2004)
- Pippi Langstrumpf (Pippi Långstrump) (1969–present)
- Rappelkiste (1973–1987)
- Tabaluga (1997–2007)
- Cosmic Quantum Ray (2009)
- Tabaluga tivi (1997–2011)
- The Muppet Show (Die Muppet Show) (1977–1989)
- Mia and Me (2012–present)

=== Culture ===
- aspekte (1965–present)
- Das Blaue Sofa (2003–present)
- Das Literarische Quartett (1998–2006, 2015–present)

=== Documentaries ===
Clip of a Report from the program Terra X

- 37 Grad (1994–present)
- Alexander the Great (2014)
- Die Deutschen (2008/2010)
- Terra X (1982–present)
- Terra Xpress (2011–present)
- ZDFzeit (2012–present)
- ZDF-History (2000–present)

=== Entertainment ===
- Bares für Rares, hosted by Horst Lichter (2013–present)
- Blond am Freitag (2002–2007)
- Blond am Sonntag (2001)
- Dance Academy (2010)
- Das große Los – Die Show für die Aktion Sorgenkind, hosted by Dieter Thomas Heck (1996–2000)
- Der Quiz-Champion (2012–present)
- Die Anstalt, comedy hosted by Claus von Wagner and Max Uthoff (2014–present)
- Die Goldene Kamera (1973, 1986, 1989, 1990, 1992, 1994–present)
- Die goldene Stimmgabel, hosted by Dieter Thomas Heck (1993, 1995, 1997, 1999, 2001–2007)
- Die größten Musical Hits (The Greatest Musical Hits)
- Die Helene Fischer Show, hosted by Helene Fischer (2013–present)
- Die Pyramide, German version of Pyramid hosted by Dieter Thomas Heck/Micky Beisenherz and Joachim Llambi (1979–1994, 2012)
- Die ZDF-Hitparade, hosted by Dieter Thomas Heck/Viktor Worms/Uwe Hübner (1969–2000)
- Die ZDF-Kultnacht (2002–present)
- Disco (1971–1982)
- Grand Prix der Volksmusik (1986–2010)
- heute-show, comedy hosted by Oliver Welke (2009–present)
- Kerner kocht, cooking show hosted by Johannes B. Kerner (2005–2008)
- Lafer! Lichter! Lecker!, cooking show hosted by Johann Lafer and Horst Lichter (2006–2017)
- Mainz bleibt Mainz, wie es singt und lacht (Carnival) (1973–present)
- Melodien für Millionen, hosted by Dieter Thomas Heck (1985–2007)
- Musik liegt in der Luft, hosted by Dieter Thomas Heck (1991–1998)
- Neues aus der Anstalt, comedy hosted by Urban Priol (2007–2013)
- Nicht nachmachen! (2012–2013)
- Rockpop (1977–1981)
- Rock Pop Music Hall (1984–1986)
- Show Palast, hosted by Dieter Thomas Heck (1999–2000)
- Wetten, dass..?, hosted by Frank Elstner/Thomas Gottschalk/Wolfgang Lippert/Markus Lanz (1981–2014, 2021–present)
- Willkommen 20xx, the New Year's Eve show broadcast
- Willkommen bei Carmen Nebel, hosted by Carmen Nebel (2004–present)
- ZDF Fernsehgarten, hosted by Andrea Kiewel (1986–present)

=== Information ===
- Aktenzeichen XY… ungelöst, hosted by Eduard Zimmermann/Sabine Zimmermann/Butz Peters/Rudi Cerne
- auslandsjournal (1973–present)
- Berlin direkt (1999–present)
- Bonn direkt (1987–1999)
- Chronik der Woche (1965–1984)
- Die Drehscheibe (1964–1982)
- Die Knoff-Hoff-Show (1986-1999)
- drehscheibe (1998–present)
- Frontal, hosted by Bodo H. Hauser and Ulrich Kienzle (1993–2000)
- Frontal21 (2001–present)
- hallo deutschland (1997–present)
- heute (newscast) (1963–present)
- heute aus den Ländern (newscast) (1983–1992)
- heute journal (newscast) (1978–present)
- heute mittag (newscast) (1998–2009)
- heute nacht (newscast) (1994–2015)
- heute Xpress (newscast) (2015–present)
- Kennzeichen D (1971–2001)
- länderjournal (1991–1996)
- Leute heute (1997–present)
- ML Mona Lisa (1988–present)
- Politbarometer (1977–present)
- tele-illustrierte (1982–1991)
- Volle Kanne – Service täglich (1999–present)
- WISO (1984–present)
- ZDF-abendmagazin (1996–1997)
- ZDF-Magazin, hosted by Gerhard Löwenthal/Fritz Schenk/Wolfgang Weinert/Hans Scheicher (1969–1988)
- ZDF-Mittagsmagazin (1989–present)
- ZDF-Morgenmagazin (1992–present)
- ZDFzoom (2011–present)

=== Series ===
- ALF (1988–1996)
- Bella Block (1994–present)
- Blochin (2015)
- Borgia (Borgia: Faith and Fear), co-producers CANAL+ (France) and others (2011, 2013)
- The Bridge (2011), co-producers Sveriges Television and DR
- Cologne P.D. (2003–present)
- Das Kriminalmuseum (1963–1973)
- Das Traumschiff (1981–present)
- Der Adler – Die Spur des Verbrechens (Ørnen) (2005–2007, 2009–2010, 2012, 2014, 2017)
- Der Alte (The Old Fox) (1977–present)
- Der Bergdoktor (2008–present)
- Der kleine Doktor (1974, 1981–1982)
- Der Kommissar (1969–1976)
- Der Kommissar und das Meer (Kommissarien och havet) (2007–present)
- Der Kriminalist (2006–present)
- Der Landarzt (1987–2016)
- Derrick (1974–1998)
- Die Bergretter (2009–present)
- Die Chefin (2012–present)
- Die Garmisch-Cops (2012, 2014, 2016)
- Die Rosenheim-Cops (2002–present)
- Die Schwarzwaldklinik (The Black Forest Clinic) (1985–2013)
- Die Toten vom Bodensee (2014–present)
- Diese Drombuschs (1983–1995, 1998–2000)
- Dr. Klein (2014–2016)
- Ein Fall für Zwei (1981–2013)
- Ein starkes Team (1994–present)
- Forsthaus Falkenau (1989–2016)
- Freunde fürs Leben (1992–2005, 2008)
- Friesland (2015–present)
- Girl friends – Freundschaft mit Herz (1995–2009)
- Helen Dorn (2014–present)
- Herzensbrecher – Vater von vier Söhnen (2013–2016)
- Highway to Heaven (Ein Engel auf Erden) (1987–1990)
- Hotel (1985, 1988)
- Hotel Paradies (1990–1992, 1995–1996, 1998, 2000–2001, 2009)
- Ich heirate eine Familie (1987–1992, 1998–2008, 2013)
- In Plain Sight (2010, 2013–2014, 2016)
- Inga Lindström (2004–present)
- Jack Holborn (miniseries for Christmas 1982)
- Jack Taylor (2013, 2017)
- Jede Menge Leben (1995–1996)
- Kidnap and Ransom (Der Jäger – Geld oder Leben) (2016–present)
- Kommissarin Lucas (2003–present)
- Kripo Holstein (2013–2015)
- Ku'damm 56 (2016)
- Küstenwache (1997–2016)
- Leipzig Homicide (2001–present)
- Letzte Spur Berlin (2012–present)
- Lotta & ... (2010–present)
- Magnum, P.I. (Magnum) (2012–2015)
- Matlock (1998–1992)
- Midsomer murders (Inspector Barnaby) (2005–present)
- Mino (1986 Christmas miniseries)
- Mordkommission Königswinkel (2017–present)
- Morgen hör ich auf (2016)
- New Tricks (New Tricks – Die Krimispezialisten) (2005)
- Notruf Hafenkante (2007–present)
- Princesses of Science (2023-2024) Hosted by Linh, Pratrizia and Johanna
- Ray Donovan (2014–2016)
- Salto Kommunale (1998, 2001–2002)
- Salto Postale (1993–1997, 2002–2003, 2006)
- Sibel&Max (2015–2016)
- Siska (2002–2010)
- SOKO 5113 (1978–present)
- SOKO Donau/SOKO Wien (2005–present)
- SOKO Hamburg (2018–present)
- SOKO Kitzbühel (2003–present)
- SOKO Rhein-Main (2006–2008, 2010)
- SOKO Wismar (2004–present)
- "Solo für Weiss" (2016–present)
- Sperling (1996–2013)
- Star Trek (Raumschiff Enterprise) (1972–1982)
- Star Trek: The Next Generation (Raumschiff Enterprise: Das nächste Jahrhundert) (1990–1993)
- Stubbe – Von Fall zu Fall (1995–2016)
- Stuttgart Homicide (2009–present)
- The Bold and the Beautiful (Reich und Schön) (2002–2008, 2010–2011)
- The Fall (The Fall – Tod in Belfast) (2015)
- The Five (2017)
- The Muppet Show (Die Muppet Show) (1977–1989)
- The Simpsons (Die Simpsons) (1991–1993)
- The Young and the Restless (Schatten der Leidenschaft) (2008)
- Unser Charly (1995–2012)
- Unsere Mütter, unsere Väter (Generation War) (2013)
- Veronica Mars (2006–2008)
- Welcome Back, Kotter (1979–1980)
- Wilsberg (1999–present)

=== Sport ===
- das aktuelle sportstudio (1963–present)
- FIFA World Cup (1966–present)
- UEFA European Championship (1964–present)
- UEFA Champions League (Final Only)

=== Talk ===
- Dunja Hayali, hosted by Dunja Hayali (2015–present)
- Johannes B. Kerner, talk show hosted by Johannes B. Kerner (1998–2009)
- live (1986–1997)
- Markus Lanz, talk show hosted by Markus Lanz (2008–present)
- Maybrit Illner, a political talk show hosted by Maybrit Illner (1999–present)
- Peter Hahne, hosted by Peter Hahne (2010–2017)
- Tacheles, hosted by Johannes Gross (1996)
- Willemsens Woche, hosted by Roger Willemsen (1994–1998)
- Zeugen des Jahrhunderts (1979–present)

== Audience share ==
=== Germany ===
Year	January	February	March	April	May	June	July	August	September	October	November	December	Annual average
1990	–	–	–	–	–	–	–	–	–	–	–	–	28.8%
1991	–	–	–	–	–	–	–	–	–	–	–	–	▼25.6%
1992	–	–	–	–	–	–	–	–	–	–	–	–	▼22.0%
1993	–	–	–	–	–	–	–	–	–	–	–	–	▼18.0%
1994	–	–	–	–	–	–	–	–	–	–	–	–	▼17.0%
1995	–	–	–	–	–	–	–	–	–	–	–	–	▼14.7%
1996	14.7%	15.2%	13.6%	13.1%	13.6%	17.4%	15.8%	13.7%	13.1%	13.3%	14.8%	14.2%	▼14.4%
1997	14.6%	14.6%	13.4%	12.4%	12.8%	12.9%	12.7%	13.2%	13.3%	12.4%	13.7%	14.4%	▼13.4%
1998	13.9%	15.3%	13.0%	12.3%	12.5%	17.4%	14.2%	12.8%	12.1%	13.1%	13.1%	13.3%	▲13.6%
1999	14.2%	14.3%	14.0%	12.4%	12.1%	12.6%	13.2%	12.6%	12.0%	13.0%	13.4%	13.8%	▼13.2%
2000	14.2%	13.8%	13.4%	11.6%	12.3%	15.3%	13.7%	13.3%	13.0%	12.7%	12.8%	13.2%	▲13.3%
2001	13.2%	13.3%	13.1%	11.3%	11.7%	12.2%	14.2%	13.7%	12.5%	13.5%	13.8%	13.8%	▼13.0%
2002	14.4%	15.5%	13.4%	12.4%	12.7%	16.4%	13.9%	14.1%	12.3%	13.1%	13.2%	13.9%	▲13.8%
2003	13.9%	13.6%	13.7%	12.5%	12.3%	12.5%	13.9%	13.5%	12.3%	13.0%	13.2%	13.7%	▼13.2%
2004	14.1%	13.9%	12.9%	12.5%	12.5%	14.8%	15.1%	15.9%	12.8%	12.7%	12.9%	13.9%	▲13.6%
2005	14.0%	14.2%	13.7%	13.4%	12.7%	13.7%	14.0%	13.2%	13.3%	12.9%	13.2%	13.6%	▼13.5%
2006	13.2%	14.4%	13.6%	13.1%	12.3%	16.9%	15.7%	12.4%	12.4%	12.5%	13.3%	13.5%	▲13.6%
2007	14.2%	13.5%	13.0%	12.0%	12.1%	12.5%	12.6%	12.3%	12.5%	12.8%	13.2%	13.4%	▼12.9%
2008	13.5%	12.9%	13.4%	12.2%	11.6%	17.6%	12.1%	13.6%	12.3%	12.7%	12.8%	12.9%	▲13.1%
2009	14.3%	13.2%	12.7%	12.0%	11.7%	12.5%	11.9%	12.6%	12.3%	12.2%	11.7%	12.6%	▼12.5%
2010	13.1%	13.8%	12.5%	11.3%	11.9%	16.7%	13.7%	11.9%	11.4%	12.4%	11.7%	12.3%	▲12.7%
2011	12.9%	13.0%	13.0%	11.7%	11.3%	12.0%	12.9%	10.7%	11.4%	11.7%	11.9%	12.5%	▼12.1%
2012	12.6%	12.7%	12.5%	11.1%	12.1%	15.5%	12.8%	13.0%	11.3%	12.5%	12.0%	12.7%	▲12.6%
2013	13.6%	13.5%	13.1%	12.9%	12.9%	12.0%	12.2%	12.5%	12.8%	12.7%	12.7%	12.5%	▲12.8%
2014	13.4%	15.1%	12.3%	12.7%	12.0%	17.6%	14.8%	11.6%	12.5%	12.3%	12.3%	12.7%	▲13.3%
2015	14.2%	12.9%	12.8%	12.2%	12.1%	12.7%	12.3%	12.1%	12.1%	12.0%	12.1%	12.3%	▼12.5%
2016	13.2%	12.6%	12.9%	12.6%	12.0%	17.1%	13.3%	14.3%	11.9%	11.9%	12.4%	12.5%	▲13.0%
2017	13.9%	13.3%	13.0%	12.5%	12.6%	13.2%	13.0%	13.1%	12.9%	12.4%	13.5%	13.1%	13.0%
2018	14.1%	14.6%	13.9%	13.4%	13.1%	16.9%	15.5%						

The average viewer age is 62 years (as of 2016).
