= Monica Lierhaus =

German sports journalist

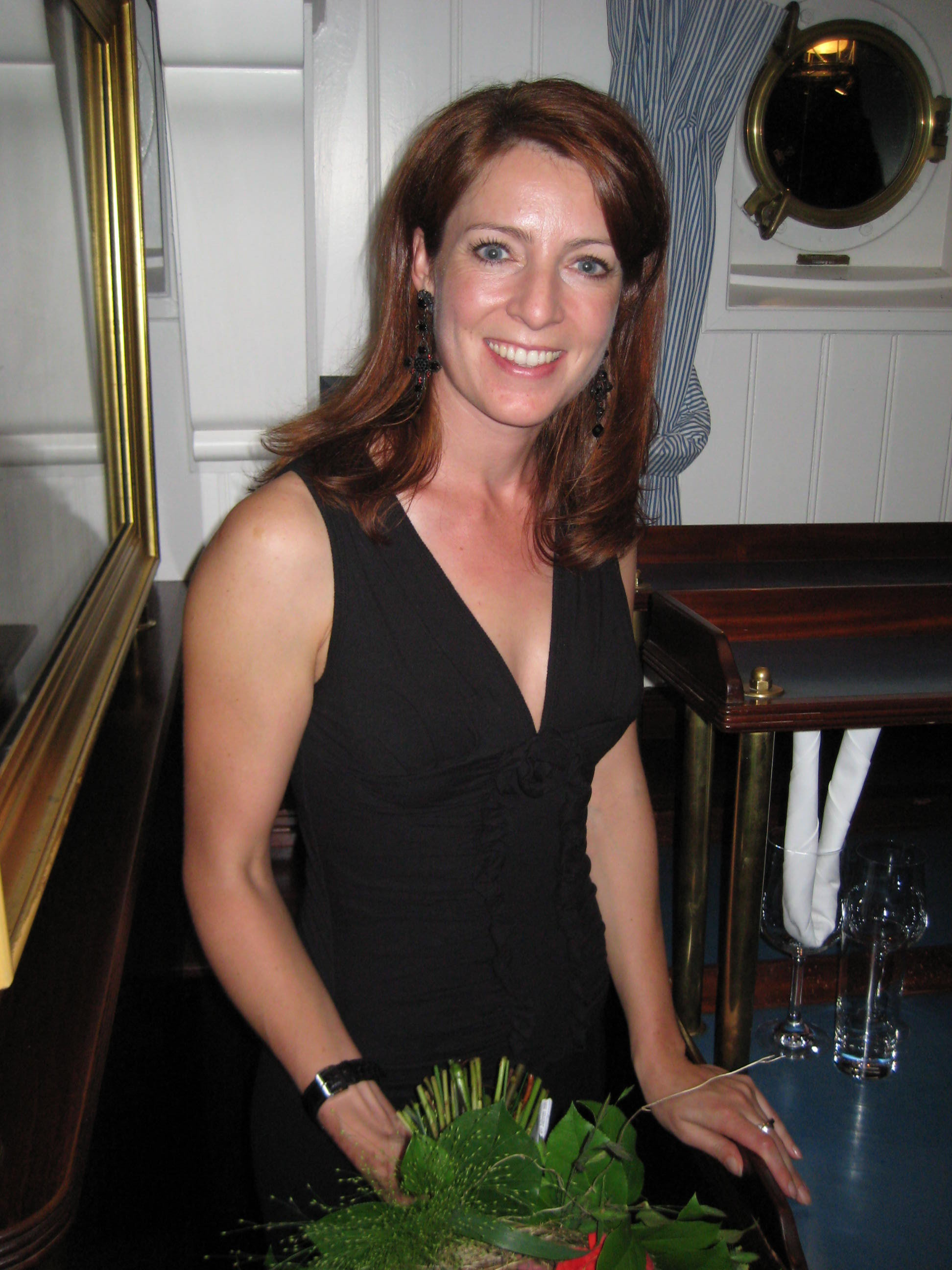
Monica Lierhaus, 2008

Monica-Christiane Lierhaus (born 25 May 1970 in Hamburg) is a German sports journalist.

In 1989, she passed her Abitur at the Charlotte-Paulsen-Gymnasium in Hamburg. She studied English and German literature at the University of Hamburg during which she worked as a junior in the editorial office of the magazine Sport-Bild. She also worked as a freelancer for German radio stations Radio Hamburg and Klassik Radio. In 1992 she dropped out of university to become an anchorwoman for the Hamburg local news show on Sat.1.

Between 1994 and 1996 she was a reporter for Sat.1 working in Germany and abroad.

== Shows hosted ==
- 1997–1998: Blitz
- 1999–2001: ran (Bundesliga magazine)
- 1999–2003: various football and tennis shows for the German pay TV network Premiere.

She was also a presenter on Die Knoff-Hoff-Show.

In 2004 she became one of the anchors of the Sportschau (Bundesliga magazine on ARD) hosting the Saturday afternoon football match highlights. She rotated in this role with Reinhold Beckmann and Gerhard Delling. She has also been a TV presenter for live football matches such as the DFB-Pokal. Lierhaus has presented several major sporting events for ARD such as the Tour de France, 2004 Summer Olympics, 2006 Winter Olympics, 2008 Summer Olympics and skiing tournaments.

In January 2009 Lierhaus stopped appearing on TV after suffering a cerebral hemorrhage due to an aneurysm after which she was put into a coma for almost four months. She has since had to relearn basic skills including movement and speech. A spokesman for ARD said that she was welcome to return to the screen whenever she was ready.

She appeared on the Goldene Kamera award show on 5 February 2011 to receive an honorary award. Her movement and speech had not fully recovered but her intellect seemed unimpaired. During her acceptance speech she asked her partner Rolf Hellgardt to marry her, and he accepted. Lierhaus never married her partner and their separation was announced on 8 May 2015.

== Salary scandal ==
Lierhaus returned to television as presenter of the charitable, non-profit lottery of German broadcaster ARD in 2011. Shortly after, Spiegel Online reported that the annual salary paid to her for this amounted to at least €450,000. The ensuing public debate about Lierhaus's high salary resulted in damage to the lottery's image as well as its finances, as many people cancelled their lottery subscriptions. Lierhaus defended herself saying that her predecessors had been paid for their presenter work as well, and that she also "would have to live on something" after all. In October 2013, the lottery announced that Lierhaus's contract would not be renewed after the end of the same year.
