= Gerhard Löwenthal =

German journalist (1922–2002)

Gerhard Löwenthal (8 December 1922 in Berlin – 6 December 2002 in Wiesbaden) was a prominent German journalist, human rights activist and author. He presented the ZDF-Magazin, a news magazine of ZDF which highlighted human rights abuses in communist-ruled Eastern Europe, from 1969 to 1987. Löwenthal, who was known as a staunch anticommunist, was president of the Germany Foundation from 1977 to 1994.

He was Jewish and was deported to the Sachsenhausen concentration camp during Nazi rule. After the war, he chose to remain in his native country and went on to study medicine. He also worked as a reporter for RIAS, before he became one of the first students at the Free University of Berlin. He considered himself "a man of the center" ("ein Mann der Mitte") and lamented the ever increasing trend towards left in the West German political life, which made him look like an arch-conservative.

His father-in-law was CDU politician and minister Ernst Lemmer.

The Gerhard Löwenthal Prize, annually awarded by his widow Ingeborg Löwenthal, the conservative newspaper Junge Freiheit and the Foundation for Conservative Education and Research, is named in his honour.

He is buried at the Jewish cemetery at Heerstraße in Berlin.

== Publications ==
- Löwenthal, Gerhard (2006). Ich bin geblieben Erinnerungen (in German). Berlin. ISBN 978-3-929886-25-2. OCLC 181536092.
- Löwenthal, Gerhard; Wilbert, Karl-Jürgen (1985). Reden wir morgen in Sprechblasen? Auf d. Weg zu e. neuen Medienlandschaft (in German). Koblenz. ISBN 978-3-924871-04-8. OCLC 74790058.
- Löwenthal, Gerhard; Kamphausen, Helmut; Clausen, Claus P. (2002). Hilferufe von drüben eine Dokumentation wider das Vergessen (in German). Holzgerlingen. ISBN 978-3-7751-3807-9. OCLC 76475123.
- Wir werden durch Atome leben. Blanvalet, Berlin 1956 (with Josef Hausen)
- Die ungarische Revolution: Ein Weissbuch. Die Geschichte des Oktober-Aufstandes nach Dokumenten, Meldungen, Augenzeugenberichten und das Echo der Weltöffentlichkeit. Colloquium Verlag, Berlin 1957 (with Melvin J. Lasky, Karl Jaspers)

== Literature ==
- Gerlof, Kathrin (1999). Gerhard Löwenthal, Karl-Eduard von Schnitzler (in German). Frankfurt am Main. ISBN 978-3-596-14183-8. OCLC 231843246.
- Winckler, Stefan (1997). Ein kritischer Journalist aus Berlin : Gerhard Löwenthal (in German). Paderborn: Snayder Verlag. ISBN 3-932319-56-7. OCLC 44912345.
