= Samia Akariou =

Moroccan actress

Samia Akariou Arabic: سامية أقريو
- Born: 28 May 1972 (age 53); Chefchaouen, Morocco
- Occupations: Actress; Director

Samia Akariou (Arabic: سامية أقريو) is a Moroccan actress and director born (28 May 1972) in Chefchaouen, Morocco.

== Biography ==
Samia Akariou was born in 1972 in the town of Chefchaouen, Morocco. She studied and graduated from the Higher Institute of Dramatic Arts and Cultural Activities (ISADAC) and the Higher National Drama Paris Conservatoire.

She began her career in theater by presenting several pieces, then the cinema in the film (Lalla Hobbi) Mohamed Abderrahman Tazi of who did it truly known to the public. She worked in films Tricks women Farida Belyazid, Friends yesterday by Hassan Benjelloun and Ali, Rabiaa and Others ... Ahmed Boulane.
