= Andrea Kiewel =

German television presenter

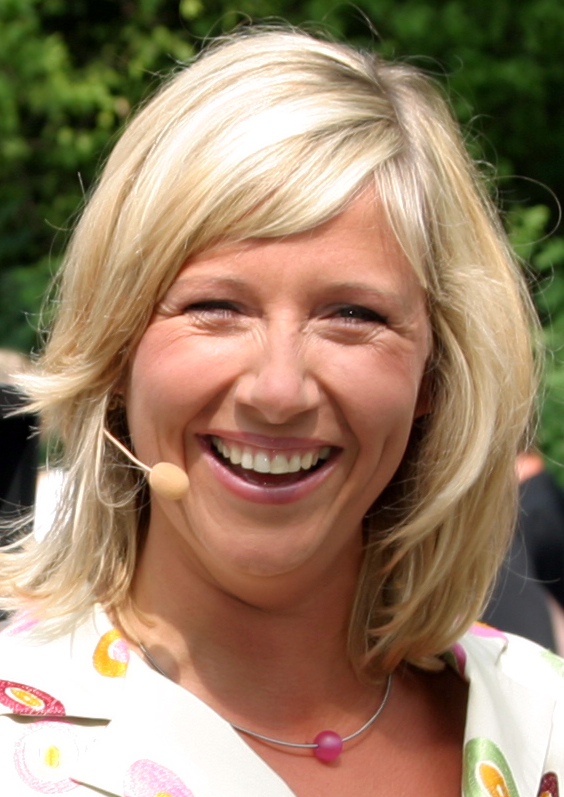
Kiewel at ZDF Fernsehgarten

Andrea Kiewel (née Mathyssek, born 10 June 1965 in East Berlin) is a German television presenter and former competitive swimmer. She is the current presenter of ZDF Fernsehgarten and ZDF Fernsehgarten on Tour. Kiewel usually presents Willkommen, the ZDF new year open-air show live from Berlin. Her son Maximilian Kiewel (born 1986) is a journalist who worked as chief reporter for Bild and television presenter at BILD TV for the television show Achtung Fahndung! and now as Director for Defense & Military at Lufthansa.

== Controversy ==
During a July 2026 episode of ZDF Fernsehgarten, a segment on Pokémon cards featured two collectors showing Kiewel several cards, one of which was written in Japanese. While looking at the Japanese card, Kiewel called it "Chinese", then said "ching chong chaang" while laughing. The remark was widely criticized as racist and described as an example of everyday racism. Kiewel later apologized for the remark through ZDF, saying she regretted her words. ZDF also apologized and said that it explicitly opposed all forms of racism. One of the Pokémon collectors later distanced herself from Kiewel's remark on Instagram, saying that she had been too shocked to react quickly enough.
