= ZDF-Magazin =

- Country of origin: Germany

Original release
- Network: ZDF
- Release: 8 January 1969 – 30 March 1988

ZDF-Magazin is a West German television news magazine which ran on ZDF from 1969 to 1988. It was presented by Gerhard Löwenthal. It focused on communist-ruled Eastern Europe and was particularly known for reporting on human rights abuses there. The magazine was known for its conservative and anti-socialist views which led to several controversial reactions from viewers and politicians. Löwenthal criticized communists, East Germany, leftist student movement (″red psychoterrorists″), social democrats' Ostpolitik ("communist agents"), the so-called peace movement ("Moscow's partisans") and West German writers such as Heinrich Böll ("sympathizers of leftist fascism").

== Literature ==
- Kathrin Gerlof: Gegenspieler: Gerhard Löwenthal, Karl-Eduard von Schnitzler. Fischer Taschenbuch, Frankfurt am Main 1999, ISBN 3-596-14183-4
- Gerhard Löwenthal/Helmut Kamphausen/Claus Peter Clausen: Hilferufe von drüben. Eine Dokumentation wider das Vergessen. 3. Auflage, Hänssler-Verlag, Holzgerlingen 2002, ISBN 3-7751-3807-2
- Auf den Spuren von Hilferufe von Drüben, in: Bürgerkomitee Sachsen-Anhalt (Hrsg.): Ost-West-, West-Ost-Geschichten, Magdeburg 1997
