= Johann Lafer =

Austrian chef

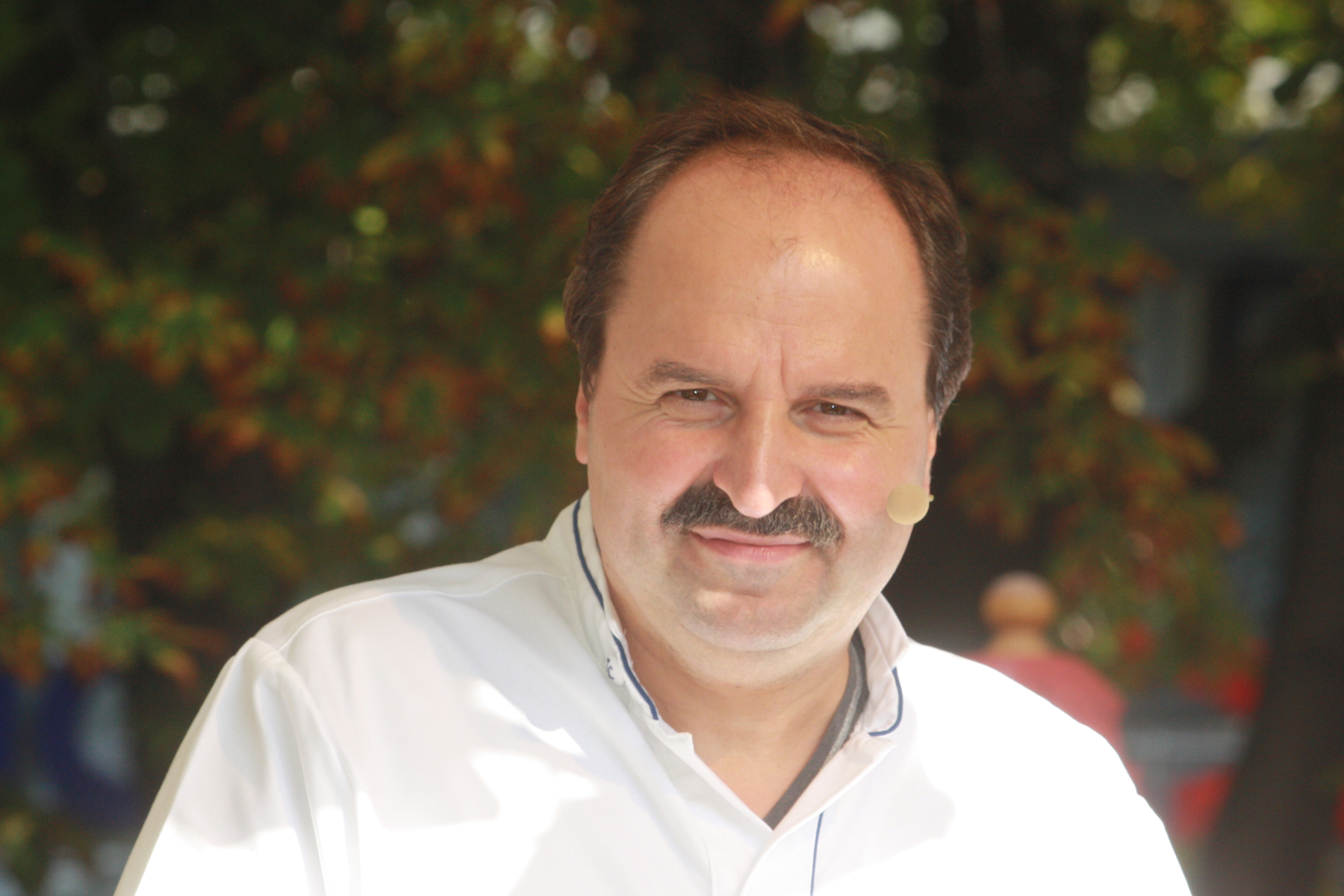
- Lafer in 2012
- Born: 27 September 1957 (age 68); St. Stefan im Rosental, Steiermark, Austria
- Occupation: Chef
- Website: lafer.de

Signature
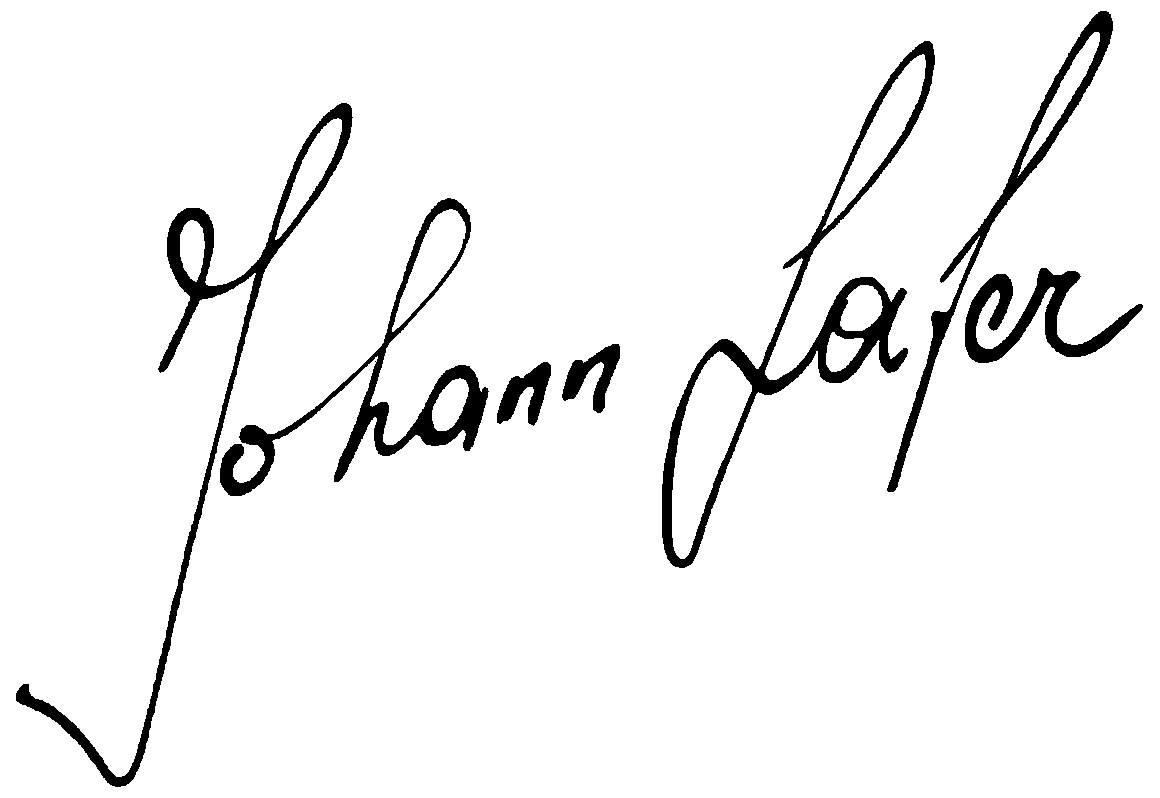

Johann Lafer (born 27 September 1957) is an Austrian chef living in Germany. He became well known through his TV cooking show and his numerous cookbooks. His television show is self-produced.

He was a regular guest of the television host Markus Lanz, in whose show he regularly prepared meals in front of an audience.

He lives with his wife Silvia and two children Jennifer and Jonathan in a little village called Guldental. He also operates a cooking school in Guldental.

== Achievements ==
- In 1997 Lafer was named "Chef of the Year" by "Gault Millau"
- In 2006 he was given a star by "Guide Michelin".
- Produces his own cooking show on television.
- Started a pilot project for healthy eating in schools (food@ucation)
- Runs his cooking school in Guldental
