= Mohn (surname) =

Mohn is a surname. The word in German means "poppy". Notable people with the surname include:

- Albert Henrik Mohn (1918–1999), Norwegian journalist
- Bill Mohn (1899–1952), American football player
- Christian Mohn (1926–2019), Norwegian ski jumper and sports official
- Ellef Mohn (1894–1974), Norwegian football player
- Emanuel Mohn (1842–1891), Norwegian educator
- Henrik Mohn (1835–1916), Norwegian astronomer and meteorologist
- Jakob Mohn (1838–1882), Norwegian statistician
- Justin Mohn, creator of a reported 2024 beheading video
- Leo Mohn (1925–1980), American politician
- Lothar Mohn (born 1954), German choral conductor
- Liz Mohn (born 1941), widow of Reinhard Mohn
- Louise Mohn (born 1974), Norwegian entrepreneur
- Per Mohn (born 1945), Norwegian politician
- Petra Mohn (1911–1996), Norwegian politician
- Reinhard Mohn (1921–2009), German businessman
- Sigfrid Mohn (1930–2015), Norwegian politician
- Trond Mohn (born 1943), Norwegian businessperson and philanthropist

== See also ==
- Rieber-Mohn, a surname
- Mohns, a surname
