= Carl Bertelsmann =

German publisher (1791–1850)

- Born: 11 October 1791
- Died: 17 December 1850 (aged 59)

Carl Bertelsmann (11 October 1791 – 17 December 1850) was a German businessman and publisher who founded the German media company Bertelsmann in 1835.

== Life ==
C. Bertelsmann Verlag was founded as a publishing house and print shop in July 1835 by Carl Bertelsmann. At first he concentrated on Christian songs and books. In 1851, the company, led by Carl's son Heinrich, began publishing novels.

Johannes Mohn, the son-in-law of Heinrich Bertelsmann, took over the management of the printing and publishing house in 1887. His heirs, including grandson Reinhard Mohn (deceased), Reinhard's wife Elisabeth and their daughter Brigitte, continue to be in charge of the Bertelsmann group and the Bertelsmann Stiftung.

He died at the age of 59 on December 17th, 1850.

== Literature ==
- Wilhelm Philipps (1955). "Bertelsmann, Carl". Neue Deutsche Biographie (in German). Vol. 2. Berlin: Duncker & Humblot. pp. 150–150. (full text online).
