= Forsa Institute =

Market research and opinion polling company

The Forsa Institute for Social Research and Statistical Analysis (German: Forsa Gesellschaft für Sozialforschung und statistische Analyse mbH), stylized as forsa for short, is one of the leading market research and opinion polling companies in Germany. It was founded in 1984 by Manfred Güllner in Cologne and is now headquartered in Berlin with a branch in Dortmund; it formerly also had an office in Riga, Latvia.

In addition to opinion research, forsa conducts surveys regarding community and other public services, basic industry, manufacturing, investments broadly construed, traffic and transport, financial services and print, television and other media. Forsa has approximately 60 permanent employees, and hires further interviewers as part-time independent contractors from Monitel GmbH. In contrast GfK, Germany's largest market research firm, has approximately 1,600 permanent employees in Germany alone.

== Methods ==
=== Telephone polling ===
Forsa currently uses computer-assisted telephone interviewing, telephoning a representative sample of at least 1,000 persons per day between 4.30 and 9.00 pm., enabling them to reach most employed people. Those 14 and older are permitted to voluntarily answer questions, which primarily concern social research, political and election research, and media, marketing and online consumer research. The phone numbers are randomly selected and all data anonymised and evaluated only for statistical purposes. For statistical reasons, only the household member who last had a birthday is interviewed. The intention is to form a picture of the "typical German" which includes all ages and both sexes in equal proportions.

To maintain objectivity, the sponsors of a questionnaire are not named until interviews are completed. However, sponsoring firms and institutions and fields of interest can be gleaned from forsa's publications and those of industry groups such as the Berufsverband Deutscher Markt- und Sozialforscher and the European Society for Opinion and Marketing Research. It is clear that opinion research alone no longer suffices to fund larger institutions.

=== Further survey methods ===
Forsa also uses other interviewing and surveying methods, in particular computer-assisted personal interviewing for business-to-business surveys.

=== Online surveys ===
For online research, forsa uses its own intranet of approximately 10,000 households throughout Germany, forsa.omninet, who are recruited offline and respond to surveys either online or via a television set-top box.

== Controversies ==
=== Accusations of political bias ===
Both forsa and its head, Manfred Güllner, have been accused of bias towards the SPD in connection with pre-election polls, most recently before the 2005 election in North Rhine-Westphalia. Forsa was successful in obtaining an injunction against accusations from the CDU on this issue, but their surveys did show in part a greater agreement with SPD positions than those of other polling firms. Forsa have themselves stated that they received 40,000 € in fees in connection with the national election in 2002 and in connection with the state election in 2005. In an interview on 6 September 2002, Hans Mathias Kepplinger, a professor of public relations at the University of Mainz, named three other firms as relatively likely to be free of party bias, but not forsa, although one of the three he named, the Institut für Demoskopie Allensbach, which has collaborated with the University of Mainz, cannot be said to be altogether free of ties to the CDU.

After the national elections in 2005, forsa's closeness to the SPD lessened appreciably and indeed reversed: in 2007 and still more in the first quarter of 2008, forsa reported poll results for the SPD an average of approximately 5% lower than those of other polling firms. Accusations have therefore been levelled at forsa of slanting results against the SPD and its "reformist course" after former Chancellor Gerhard Schröder, a longtime friend of Manfred Güllner, stood down in favour of the CDU's Angela Merkel.

One example was a study in summer 2008 on the basis of which forsa reported that 36% of SPD members had considered leaving the party. Then-party chief Kurt Beck criticised Güllner severely and stated that he would not comment on forsa surveys.

=== Accusations of data manipulation ===
In 2003 forsa was accused of data manipulation in a poll on tuition fees for higher education commissioned by the Centre for College Development (Centrum für Hochschulentwicklung) co-founded by the Bertelsmann Foundation. According to the statement of findings, the majority of students (59%) and of the population (67%) stated in November 2003 that they would accept tuition fees if they directly benefitted the educational institutions and could be financed through loans. The Centre for College Development announced these results in a press release in December 2003 and they were reported in the press. But later that month, a spokesperson for the Centre indirectly admitted that respondents were only given the option of deciding between three models of tuition fees, and not of rejecting them entirely.

In 2007 forsa was accused on the political website NachDenkSeiten of becoming involved through manipulation of a survey in a campaign by the organization Initiative Neue Soziale Marktwirtschaft (Initiative for a New Social Market Economy) for the introduction of private health insurance.

Forsa was the market research firm involved in the 2009 public relations scandal concerning Deutsche Bahn. Surveys with leading questions which produced results showing disapproval of the 2007 train drivers' strike and approval of privatisation of the railway were secretly funded by Deutsche Bahn.
