= Rita Süssmuth =

German politician (1937–2026)

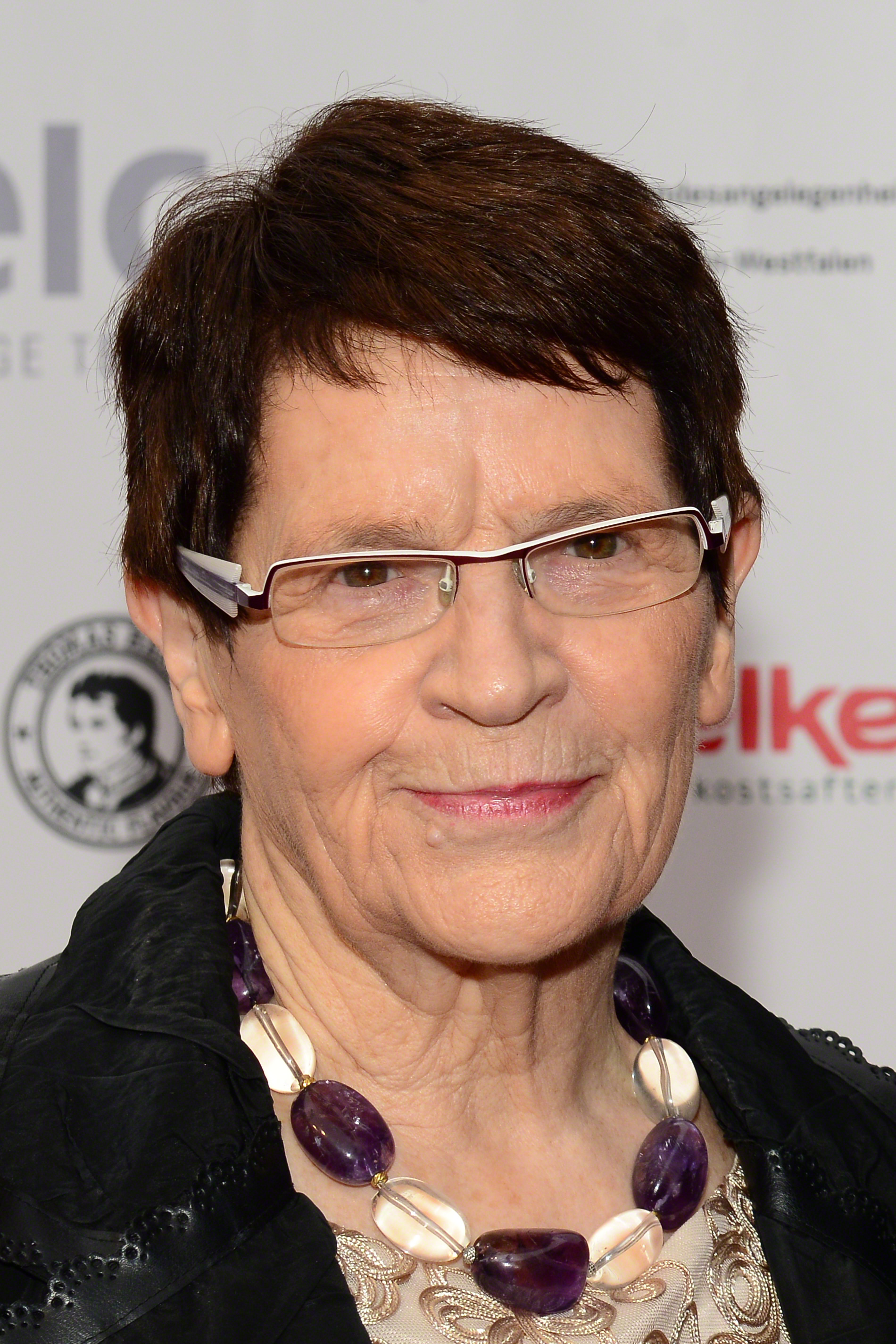
- Süssmuth in 2014

President of the Bundestag (Note: Due to the division of Germany, Süssmuth was the President of the Bundestag of West Germany from 25 November 1988 until 2 October 1990. From 3 October 1990 until 26 October 1998, she was the President of the Bundestag of the reunified Germany. The term West Germany is only the common English name for the Federal Republic of Germany between its formation on 23 May 1949 and the German reunification through the accession of East Germany (GDR) in October 1990. The office of the Bundestag never existed in the GDR.)
- In office 25 November 1988 – 26 October 1998
- Preceded by: Philipp Jenninger
- Succeeded by: Wolfgang Thierse

Minister of Family Affairs, Senior Citizens, Women and Youth
- In office 26 September 1985 – 25 November 1988
- Chancellor: Helmut Kohl
- Preceded by: Heiner Geißler
- Succeeded by: Ursula Lehr

Member of the Bundestag; from Lower Saxony
- In office 18 February 1987 – 17 October 2002
- Preceded by: Hans-Peter Voigt
- Succeeded by: Multi-member district
- Constituency: Göttingen (1987–1998); State list (1998–2002)

Personal details
- Born: Rita Kickuth; 17 February 1937 Wuppertal, Germany
- Died: 1 February 2026 (aged 88) Neuss, Germany
- Party: Christian Democratic Union
- Spouse: Hans Süssmuth (m. 1964; died 2020)
- Education: University of Münster
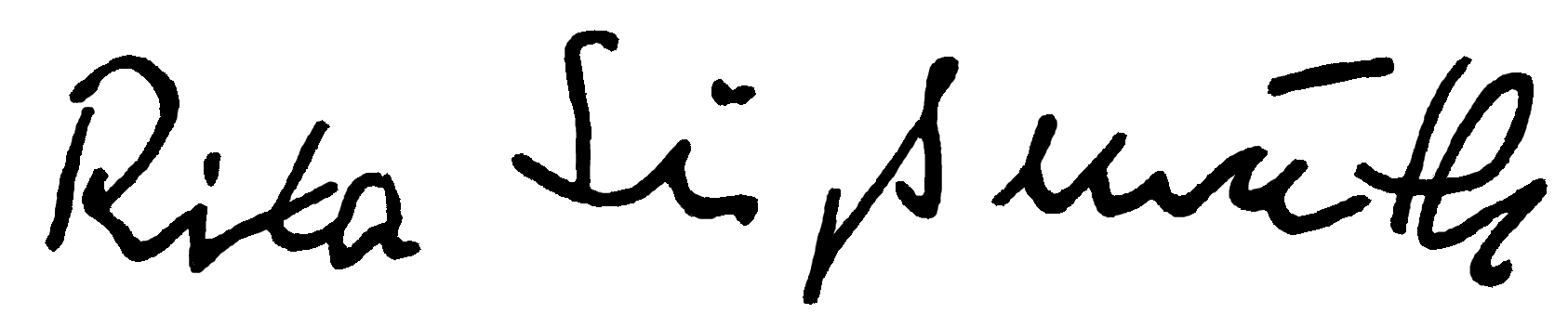
- Signature

Rita Süssmuth (née Kickuth; German: [ˈʁiːta ˈzyːsmuːt]; 17 February 1937 – 1 February 2026) was a German politician of the Christian Democratic Union (CDU) who served as the tenth president of the Bundestag.

From 1985 to 1988, Süssmuth served as Federal Minister for Youth, Family and Health (from 1986 youth, family, women and health) and from 1988 to 1998 as President of the German Bundestag. Her tenure of close to 10 years was the third longest for any Bundestag President. Only Eugen Gerstenmaier and Norbert Lammert held the position longer.

In addition to her political work, Süssmuth was President of the European Movement Germany (1994–1998) and member of the Advisory Board and Board of Trustees of the Bertelsmann Foundation (1997–2007).

== Early life and education ==
Süssmuth was born on 17 February 1937 in Wuppertal and spent her childhood in Wadersloh. After graduating from high school (Emsland Gymnasium) in Rheine in 1956, she completed a degree in Romance studies and history in Münster, Tübingen and Paris, which she finished on 20 July 1961 with the first state examination (Staatsexamen) for teaching. This was followed by postgraduate studies in educational science, sociology and psychology.

In 1964, she then received her Ph.D. at the University of Münster. Her dissertation was titled "Studies on the Anthropology of the Child in contemporary French literature" ("Studien zur Anthropologie des Kindes in der französischen Literatur der Gegenwart").

From 1966 until 1982, she was a faculty member in education at TU Dortmund University, Ruhr University, and their predecessor institutions.

== Career ==
=== Early career ===
From 1963 to 1966, Süssmuth worked as a scientific assistant at the universities of Stuttgart and Osnabrück and from 1966 as a lecturer at the Pädagogische Hochschule Ruhr. From 1969 to 1982, she had a teaching assignment at the Ruhr-Universität Bochum for International Comparative Education.

In 1971, Süssmuth was appointed professor of Educational Science at the Pädagogische Hochschule Ruhr. In 1973, she accepted the call of the TU Dortmund University. In 1971, she also began working on the scientific advisory board of the Federal Ministry of Family Affairs.

From 1982 to 1985, Süssmuth was the director of the Institut Frau und Gesellschaft in Hanover. During her time as an active politician, she gave block seminars at the University of Göttingen.

=== Political career ===
From 1985 to 1988, Süssmuth was Federal Minister of Family Affairs, Senior Citizens, Women and Youth under Chancellor Helmut Kohl. Confronted with the AIDS crisis during her tenure, she advocated for increased medical education and preventative measures. She propagated the use of condoms for the prevention of infections against resistance within her own party, the conservative Christian Democratic Union (CDU), and the Catholic Church. In 1987, she supported the foundation of the National AIDS Foundation and increased federal funding for AIDS research.

In late 1989, she joined forces with Lothar Späth, Heiner Geißler, Kurt Biedenkopf and others in an unsuccessful effort to oust Kohl as CDU chairman.

Süssmuth was a member of the German Bundestag from 1987 to 2002. In the federal elections in 1987, 1990 and 1994 she was elected for the constituency of Göttingen. For the 1998 election, she was elected via the CDU state list in Lower Saxony.

After the resignation of Philipp Jenninger in 1988 Süssmuth became the 10th President of the Bundestag. She held the post until 1998, when the SPD became the strongest group in parliament.

Her tenure saw the German reunification.

In December 1989, Süssmuth advocated a joint declaration by both German states on the recognition of the Polish western border.

From 1986 to 2001, Süssmuth served as president of the Frauen Union (the organization of the female members of the CDU) and therefore had a strong influence in her party.

== Political positions ==
Süssmuth was a supporter of the Campaign for the Establishment of a United Nations Parliamentary Assembly, an organisation which advocates for democratic reformation of the United Nations.

Ahead of the Christian Democrats' leadership election in 2021, Süssmuth publicly endorsed Armin Laschet to succeed Annegret Kramp-Karrenbauer as the party's chair.

== Life after politics ==
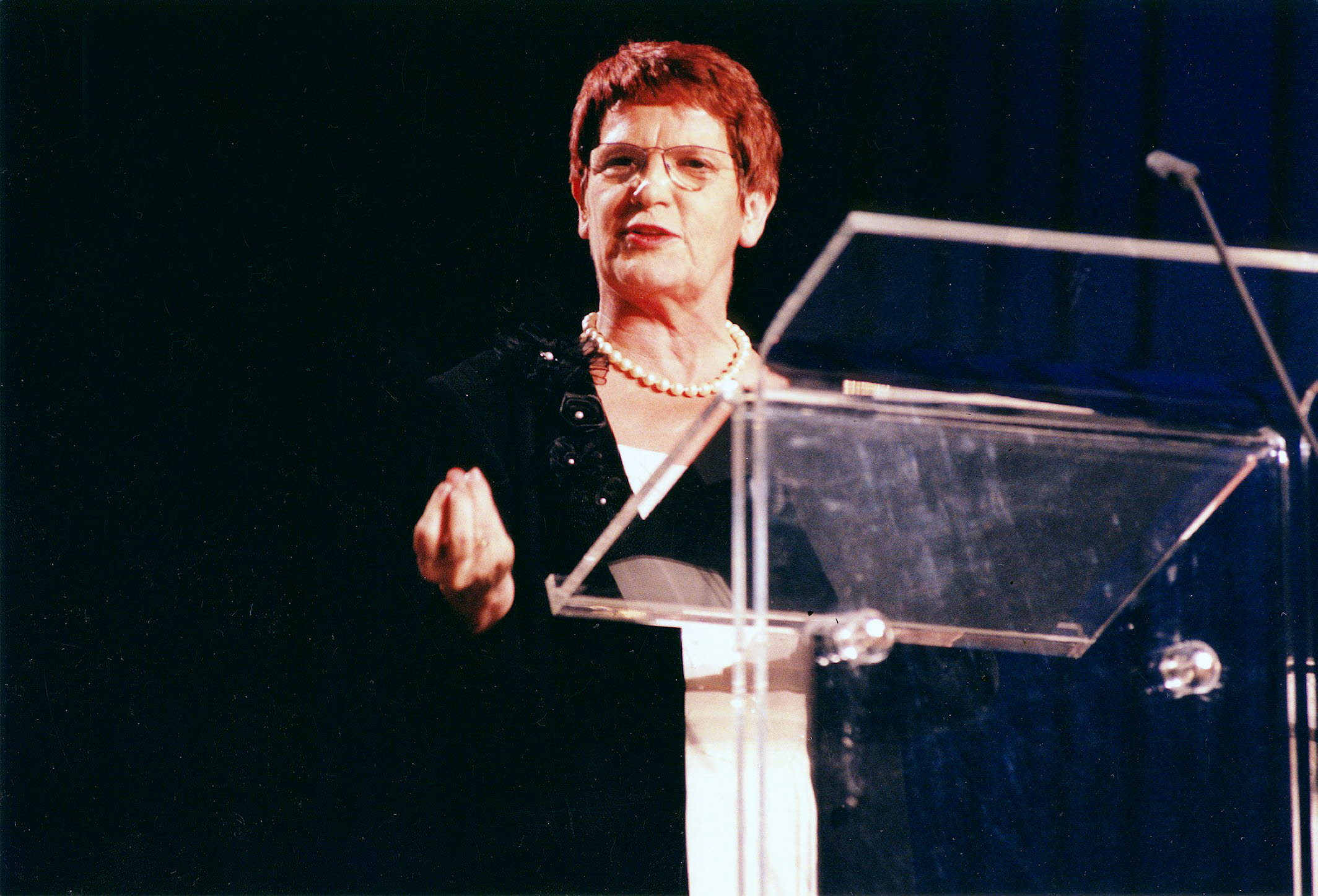
Süssmuth at Neue Stimmen 1997

In September 2000, Federal Minister of the Interior Otto Schily appointed Süssmuth as head of a high-profile bipartisan commission to overhaul Germany's immigration policies. The commission's task was to develop an overall concept for new immigration legislature. The results of the committee were presented in July 2001, in the form of a 323-paged report titled "Crafting Immigration – Promoting Integration" ("Zuwanderung gestalten – Integration fördern").

In 2002, Süssmuth became a member of the Limbach Kommission, which acts as a mediator in questions of Nazi looted art.

After leaving politics, Süssmuth was also involved in a number of philanthropic and business activities, including the following:

- UNAIDS High Level Commission on HIV Prevention, Co-Chair (since 2010)
- Technische Universität Berlin, Chairwoman of the Board of Trustees (since 2010)
- European Policy Centre (EPC), Member of the Strategic Council
- Global Commission on International Migration, Member (2003–2005)
- Migration Policy Institute (MPI), Member of the Board of Trustees
- Heinz Galinski Foundation, Member of the Board of Trustees
- Deutsche Initiative für den Nahen Osten (DINO), Member of the Board of Trustees
- Gegen Vergessen – Für Demokratie, Chairwoman of the Advisory Board
- Genshagener Kreis, Member of the Board of Trustees
- Til Schweiger Foundation, Member of the Advisory Board
- Total E-Quality initiative, Member of the Board of Trustees
- United Nations Association of Germany (DGVN), Member of the Presidium
- Bertelsmann Foundation, Member of the Board of Trustees (1997–2015)
- EnBW, Member of the Advisory Board (2004–2009)
- TDU-Hochschulkonsortium, President

Süssmuth was also Member of the European Council on Tolerance and Reconciliation established in 2008 to monitor tolerance in Europe and prepare recommendations to European governments and IGOs on fighting xenophobia and antisemitism.

In 2018 Süssmuth was awarded the Mercator Visiting Professorship for Political Management at the Universität Essen-Duisburg's NRW School of Governance.

== Personal life and death ==
Süssmuth was married to university professor Hans Süssmuth from 1964 until his death in 2020. They had one daughter, Claudia.

Rita Süssmuth died on 1 February 2026, at the age of 88. She is survived by her daughter Claudia and five grandchildren.

Federal President Frank-Walter Steinmeier ordered a state funeral.

== Awards and recognitions ==
- 1988 – Selected as Frau des Jahres 1987 by German Association of Female Citizens
- 1988 – Bambi Award
- 1989 – Leibniz-Medaille der Akademie der Wissenschaften und der Literatur Mainz
- 1990 – Grand Cross 1st class of the Order of Merit of the Order of Merit of the Federal Republic of Germany
- 1997 – Avicenna-Gold-Medaille der UNESCO
- 1997 – Frankfurter Walter-Dirks-Preis
- 2004 – Kompassnadel des Schwulen Netzwerks NRW (für ihren Einsatz für die AIDS-Prävention bes. im Schwulen Bereich)
- 2006 – Magnus Hirschfeld Medal for Sexual Reform
- 2007 – Theodor-Heuss-Preis with Mustafa Cerić
- 2007 – Niedersächsische Landesmedaille
- 2007 – Goldenes Lot, Honor of the Verband Deutscher Vermessungsingenieure
- 2007 – Reminders Day Award (2007) for her great commitment to the fight against AIDS
- 2008 – Viadrina-Preis der European University Viadrina Frankfurt (Oder)
- 2010 – Ehrensiegel der Gemeinde Wadersloh
- 2011 – Order of Merit of North Rhine-Westphalia
- 2012 – Adam-Mickiewicz-Preis for services to German-French-Polish cooperation (Weimarer Dreieck)
- 2013 – Edith-Stein-Preis
- 2014 – Leibniz-Ring-Hannover
- 2015 – Reinhard Mohn Prize
- 2015 – Winfried-Preis
- 2016 – Ehrenmitgliedschaft der Deutsche AIDS-Hilfe
- 2016 – Order of Merit of Brandenburg
- 2016 – Dorothea-Schlözer-Medaille der University of Göttingen
- 2018 – Humanismus-Preis
- 2019 – Ehrensenatorin der Technische Universität Berlin
- 2019 – Honorary member of the Lesben und Schwule in der Union
- 2023 – Honorary citizen of Neuss

=== Honorary doctorates ===
- 1988 – University of Hildesheim
- 1990 – Ruhr-Universität Bochum
- 1994 – Veliko Tarnovo University, Bulgaria
- 1996 – Sorbonne Nouvelle University, France
- 1998 – Johns Hopkins University, Baltimore, US
- 1998 – Ben-Gurion University of the Negev Beersheba, Israel
- 2002 – Universität Augsburg
- 2018 – University of Rzeszów, Poland

== Bibliography ==
- Süssmuth, Rita (1964). Studien zur Anthropologie des Kindes in der französischen Literatur der Gegenwart unter besonderer Berücksichtigung François Mauriacs (in German). OCLC 720441545.
- —— (1985). Frauen – der Resignation keine Chance (in German). Düsseldorf: Schwann. ISBN 978-3-590-18052-9.
- —— (1987). Aids (in German). Berlin: Dt. AIDS-Hilfe. ISBN 978-3-455-08668-3.
- Lissner, Anneliese; ——; Walter, Karin (1988). Frauenlexikon (in German). Freiburg [im Breisgau]: Herder & Herder. ISBN 978-3-451-20977-2.
- Glotz, Peter; ——; Seitz, Konrad (1992). Die planlosen Eliten (in German). ISBN 978-3-7654-2701-5.
- ——; Baule, Bernward (1997). Eine Deutsche Zwischenbilanz (in German). München Landsberg am Lech: Olzog. ISBN 978-3-7892-9325-2.
- —— (2002). Wer nicht kämpft, hat schon verloren (in German). München: Ullstein-Taschenbuchverl. ISBN 978-3-548-36318-9.
- "People on the move : the challenges of migration in transatlantic perspective". Bulletin of the German Historical Institute. 33: 9–22. Fall 2003.
- —— (2006). Migration und Integration: Testfall für unsere Gesellschaft (in German). München: Deutscher Taschenbuch Verlag. ISBN 978-3-423-24583-8.
- —— (2007). Dennoch: der Mensch geht vor (in German). Gütersloh: Gütersloher Verl.-Haus. ISBN 978-3-579-06451-2.
- 2007 Bildung als globale Herausforderung. Zwei Statements – ein Gespräch with Hermann Glaser, in: Robertson-von Trotha, Caroline Y. (ed.): Kultur und Gerechtigkeit (= Kulturwissenschaft interdisziplinär/Interdisciplinary Studies on Culture and Society, Vol. 2), Baden-Baden 2007, ISBN 978-3-8329-2604-5
- —— (2015). Das Gift des Politischen (in German). München: Deutscher Taschenbuch Verlag. ISBN 978-3-423-28043-3.
- —— (2020). Überlasst die Welt nicht den Wahnsinnigen: ein Brief an die Enkel (in German). München: bene!. ISBN 978-3-96340-136-7.
- —— (2022). Parität jetzt! wider die Ungleichheit von Frauen und Männern: eine Streitschrift (in German). Bonn: Verlag J.H.W. Dietz Nachf. GmbH. ISBN 978-3-8012-0547-8.
- —— (2022). Keine Zeit mehr, abzuwarten (in German). München: bene!. ISBN 978-3-96340-220-3.

== Sources ==
- Michael F. Feldkamp (ed.), Der Bundestagspräsident. Amt – Funktion – Person. 16. Wahlperiode, München 2007, ISBN 978-3-7892-8201-0
- Irene Gerlach: "Rita Süssmuth," in: Kanzler und Minister 1949 – 1998. Biographisches Handbuch der Mitglieder der deutschen Bundesregierungen, edited by Udo Kempf and Hans Georg Merz. Wiesbaden 2001.
- Steffen Kaudelka: "Rita Süssmuth," in: Biographisches Handbuch der Mitglieder des Deutschen Bundestages 1949 – 2002, edited by Rudolf Vierhaus and Ludolf Herbst. München 2002.

Political offices
Preceded by Heiner Geißler	Federal Minister of Family Affairs, Senior Citizens, Women and Youth; 1985–1988	Succeeded by Ursula Lehr
Preceded by Philipp Jenninger	President of the West German Bundestag; 1988–1990	Germany reunifies with East Germany
Germany reunified with East Germany	President of the Bundestag; 1990–1998	Succeeded by Wolfgang Thierse
