= Rieber-Mohn =

Rieber-Mohn is a surname. Notable people with the surname include:

- Georg Fredrik Rieber-Mohn (born 1945), Norwegian judge
- Hallvard Rieber-Mohn (1922–1982), Norwegian writer
- Libe Rieber-Mohn (born 1965), Norwegian politician

== See also ==
- Rieber (disambiguation)
- Mohn (disambiguation)
