= Kurt Biedenkopf =

German jurist, academic and politician (1930–2021)

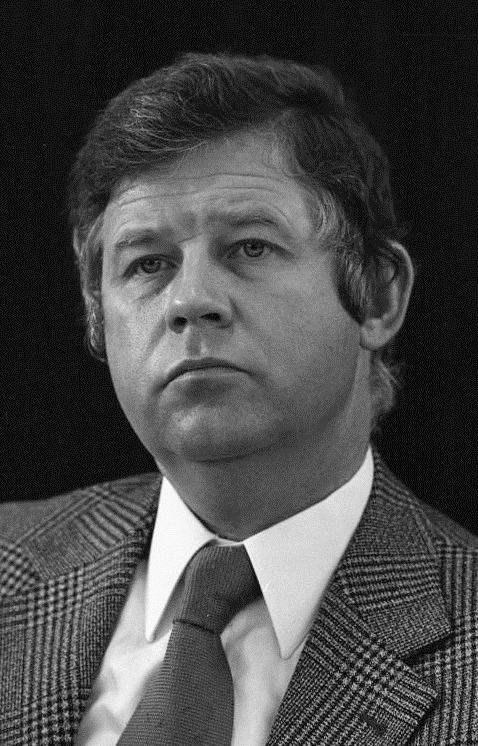
- Biedenkopf in 1973

Minister-President of Saxony
- In office 8 November 1990 – 18 April 2002
- Deputy: Rudolf Krause; Heinz Eggert; Hans Geisler
- Preceded by: Rudolf Krause (as Landesbevollmächtigter)
- Succeeded by: Georg Milbradt

President of the Bundesrat
- In office 1 November 1999 – 31 October 2000
- First Vice President: Roland Koch
- Preceded by: Roland Koch
- Succeeded by: Kurt Beck

General Secretary of the Christian Democratic Union
- In office 12 June 1973 – 7 March 1977
- Leader: Helmut Kohl
- Preceded by: Konrad Kraske
- Succeeded by: Heiner Geißler

Leader of the Christian Democratic Union in the Landtag of North Rhine-Westphalia
- In office 29 May 1980 – 24 May 1983
- Preceded by: Heinrich Köppler
- Succeeded by: Bernhard Worms
Parliamentary constituencies
Member of the Landtag of Saxony
In office 27 October 1990 – 19 October 2004
Preceded by	Constituency established
Succeeded by	multi-member district
Constituency	Christian Democratic Union List
Member of the Landtag of North Rhine-Westphalia
In office 29 May 1980 – 29 June 1988
Preceded by	multi-member district
Succeeded by	Hans-Joachim Menge
Constituency	Christian Democratic Union List
Member of the Bundestag for North Rhine-Westphalia
In office 18 February 1987 – 9 November 1990
Preceded by	multi-member district
Succeeded by	Wolfgang Lohmann
Constituency	Christian Democratic Union List
In office 14 December 1976 – 4 November 1980
Preceded by	multi-member district
Succeeded by	multi-member district
Constituency	Christian Democratic Union List

Personal details
- Born: 28 January 1930 Ludwigshafen, Free State of Bavaria, Weimar Republic (now Rhineland-Palatinate, Germany)
- Died: 12 August 2021 (aged 91) Dresden, Germany
- Education: Ludwig-Maximilians-Universität München; Goethe University Frankfurt

Kurt Hans Biedenkopf (German pronunciation: [kʊʁt ˈbiːdn̩ˌkɔp͡f]; 28 January 1930 – 12 August 2021) was a German jurist, academic teacher and politician of the Christian-Democratic Union (CDU) party. He was rector of the Ruhr University Bochum.

Biedenkopf made a political career first in North Rhine-Westphalia, where he was chairman of the party. After the re-unification of Germany, he served as the first Minister President of Saxony from 1990 until 2002. He was 54th president of the German Bundesrat from 2000, overseeing the body's move from Bonn to Berlin. Biedenkopf is regarded as the intellectual leader of the CDU when Helmut Kohl was chancellor.

Biedenkopf worked on advisory boards of institutions including the Bertelsmann Stiftung, Deutsche Nationalstiftung, Dresden Frauenkirche, Independent Commission on Turkey and the Staatliche Porzellan-Manufaktur Meissen. Among his numerous recognitions were international honorific doctorates.

== Early life and science ==
Biedenkopf was born in Ludwigshafen am Rhein. When his father became technical director of the Buna-Werke, the family moved to Schkopau, where he attended school. Biedenkopf first studied political sciences from 1949 to 1950 at Davidson College in North Carolina and at Georgetown University. He then studied economics and law in Germany at the Ludwig-Maximilians-Universität München, achieving a law doctorate in 1958. He obtained a Master in Law in 1962 from Georgetown University, where he studied and researched again from 1958 to 1959 and 1961 to 1962. In 1963 Biedenkopf completed his habilitation at Goethe University Frankfurt. He became lecturer of the Ruhr University Bochum in 1964. In 1967, he was appointed rector of the university; he was the youngest head of a university in West Germany at the time. He was lecturer and visiting professor also at the Goethe University Frankfurt and Leipzig University. In the early 1970s, Biedenkopf moved to the board of Henkel.

== Political career ==
=== Career in national politics ===
Biedenkopf was a member of the Christian-Democratic Union (CDU). He entered his professional political career when he became secretary general of the CDU in 1973, under the leadership of chairman Helmut Kohl. He resigned from that office in 1977 after disagreements with Kohl and went on to become one of his fiercest rivals within the party.

From 1977 to 1983 he was deputy chairman of the CDU in Germany. During the terms 1976–1980 and 1987–1990 he was a member of the Bundestag.

In 1979, it was revealed that Christel Broszey, Biedenkopf's secretary, disappeared and was presumed to have fled to East Germany. Media reported that Broszey had been a spy.

=== Career in North Rhine-Westphalia ===
In the 1980, state elections in North Rhine-Westphalia, Biedenkopf unsuccessfully ran against the incumbent Minister-President Johannes Rau. He served as chairman of the CDU in North Rhine-Westphalia – the party's largest chapter – until 1987, when he was succeeded by Norbert Blüm. In late 1989, he joined forces with Lothar Späth, Heiner Geißler, Rita Süssmuth and others in an unsuccessful effort to oust Kohl as CDU chairman.

=== Minister-President of Saxony ===
After the re-unification of Germany in 1990 Biedenkopf was elected as Minister-President in the newly formed state of Saxony. His party also won the subsequent elections in 1994 and 1999 with an absolute majority. He held his office until April 2002.

At the CDU's initiative, the state parliament resolved to declare Saxony a "free state" once again, recalling its 19th century history. Early in his tenure, Biedenkopf emerged as a kind of unofficial spokesman for the regions of East Germany. He enjoyed great popularity among a majority of the people of Saxony. Known for his autocratic leadership style, he was often referred to as "the Saxon King" or "King Kurt". During his time in office, he doubled outlays on primary and secondary education and sharply ramped up spending on research and development. He also led a legal battle against the European Commission on subsidies for Volkswagen investments in Saxony.

Ahead of the German presidential election in 1994, Biedenkopf was widely seen as a likely candidate, but the post went to Roman Herzog.

In 2000, Biedenkopf held the rotating presidency of the Bundesrat of Germany. In this capacity, he oversaw the body's move to Berlin to complete the government's return to the pre-World War II capital from Bonn.

In January 2001, Biedenkopf dismissed State Minister of Finance Georg Milbradt because Milbradt had started a debate about Biedenkopf's succession. Milbradt eventually succeeded Biedenkopf in 2002.

== Death ==
Gravestone Kurt Biedenkopf in Dresden

Biedenkopf died in Dresden on 12 August 2021 at the age of 91.

== Political positions ==
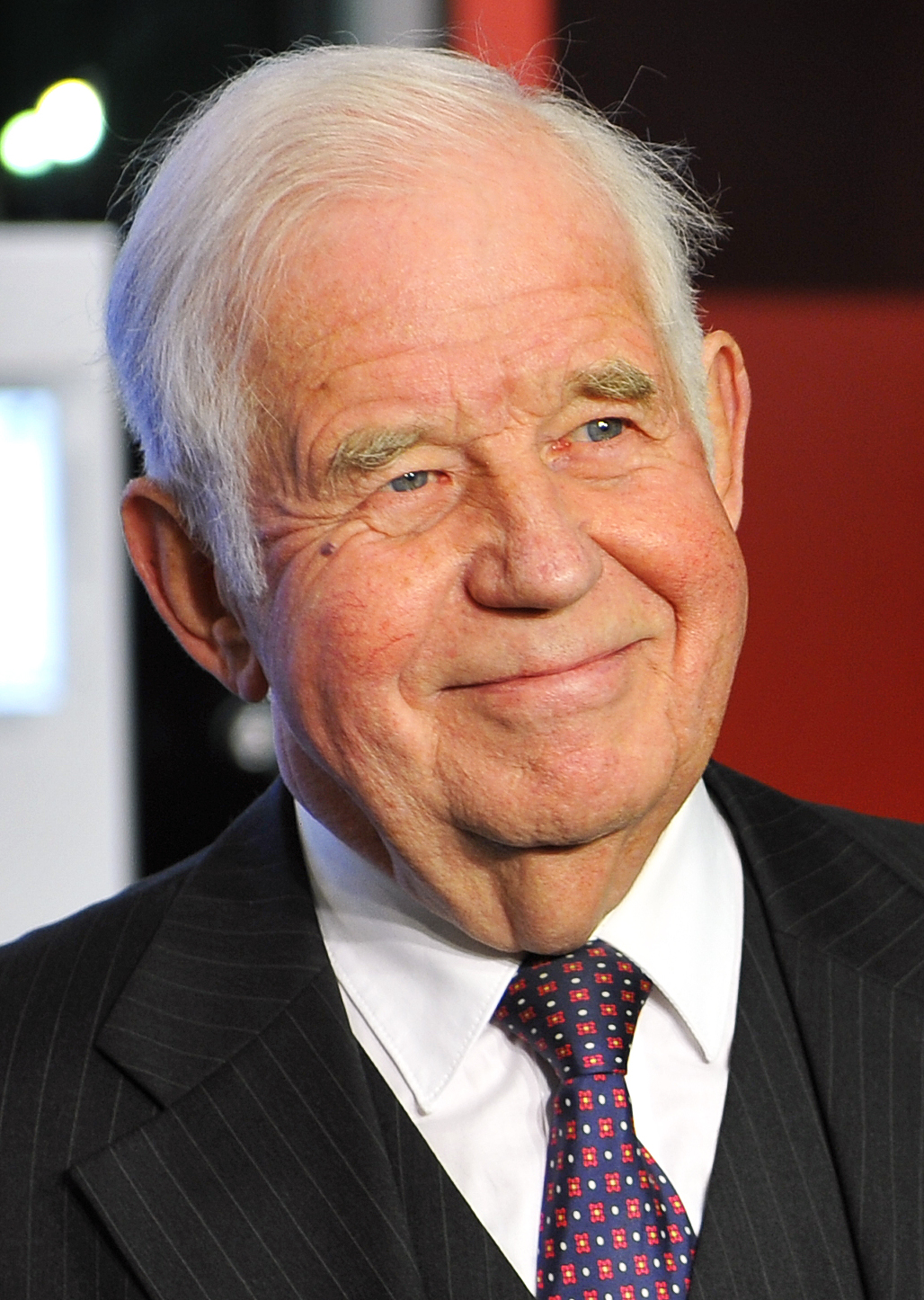
Biedenkopf in 2010

Before the introduction of the euro, Biedenkopf was the only German state leader to vote against the monetary union in the Bundesrat, the legislative body that represents the German states; he later argued that "Europe wasn't ready for that epochal step." Already in 1997, he had joined the minister-presidents of two other German states, Gerhard Schröder and Edmund Stoiber, in making the case for a five-year delay in Europe's currency union.

Ahead of the Christian Democrats' leadership election in 2018, Biedenkopf publicly endorsed Annegret Kramp-Karrenbauer to succeed Angela Merkel as the party's chair. He later supported Armin Laschet's candidacy to succeed Kramp-Karrenbauer in the 2021 leadership election.

== Other activities ==
In 1983, Biedenkopf became a member of the advisory board of the non-profit Bertelsmann Stiftung. In 1987, he became chairman of the board (until 1990). During his term, the Carl Bertelsmann Prize (today Reinhard Mohn Prize) was awarded for the first time. He was active on the board of the Deutsche Nationalstiftung, active for the unification of Germany after the separation and within the European community, and was the foundation's honorary senator until his death.

Between 2004 and 2006, Biedenkopf and Christine Bergmann served as ombuds, observing the impact of the Schröder government's labour market reforms, with a mandate to advise government and parliament on any recommended revisions to it. In 2005, he was appointed by Chancellor Gerhard Schröder to head a commission on the future of codetermination in Germany. Both Biedenkopf and Schröder later served as mediators in a 2006 conflict over privatisation plans at German railway operator Deutsche Bahn; the plans eventually fell through.

In addition, Biedenkopf held a number of paid and unpaid positions, including:

- Dresden Frauenkirche, member of the board of trustees
- International Law Institute (ILI), member of the international advisory board
- Independent Commission on Turkey, member
- Stifterverband für die Deutsche Wissenschaft, member of the board of trustees
- Hertie School of Governance, chairman of the board of trustees (2003–2010)
- Lions Club Germany Foundation, member
- Staatliche Porzellan-Manufaktur Meissen, chairman of the supervisory board (1991–2015)

== Recognition ==
- 1974: Honorary doctorate, Davidson College, Davidson, US
- 1978: Honorary doctorate, Georgetown University, Washington, US
- 1991: Decoration of Honour for Services to the Republic of Austria
- 1993: Honorary doctorate, New School for Social Research, New York, US
- 1993: Hans Böckler Prize
- 1994: Honorary doctorate, Catholic University of Brussels, Belgium
- 1994: Royal Norwegian Order of Merit
- 1997: Order of Merit of the Free State of Saxony
- 2002: Constitutional Medal of Saxony
- 2003: Brückepreis
- 2008: Honorary doctorate, HHL Leipzig Graduate School of Management
- 2011: Honorary citizen of Gröditz
- 2017: Order of Merit of North Rhine-Westphalia
- 2021: Honorary doctorate, Leipzig University

== See also ==
- Politics of Germany
