= Christoph Mohn =

German entrepreneur (born 1965)

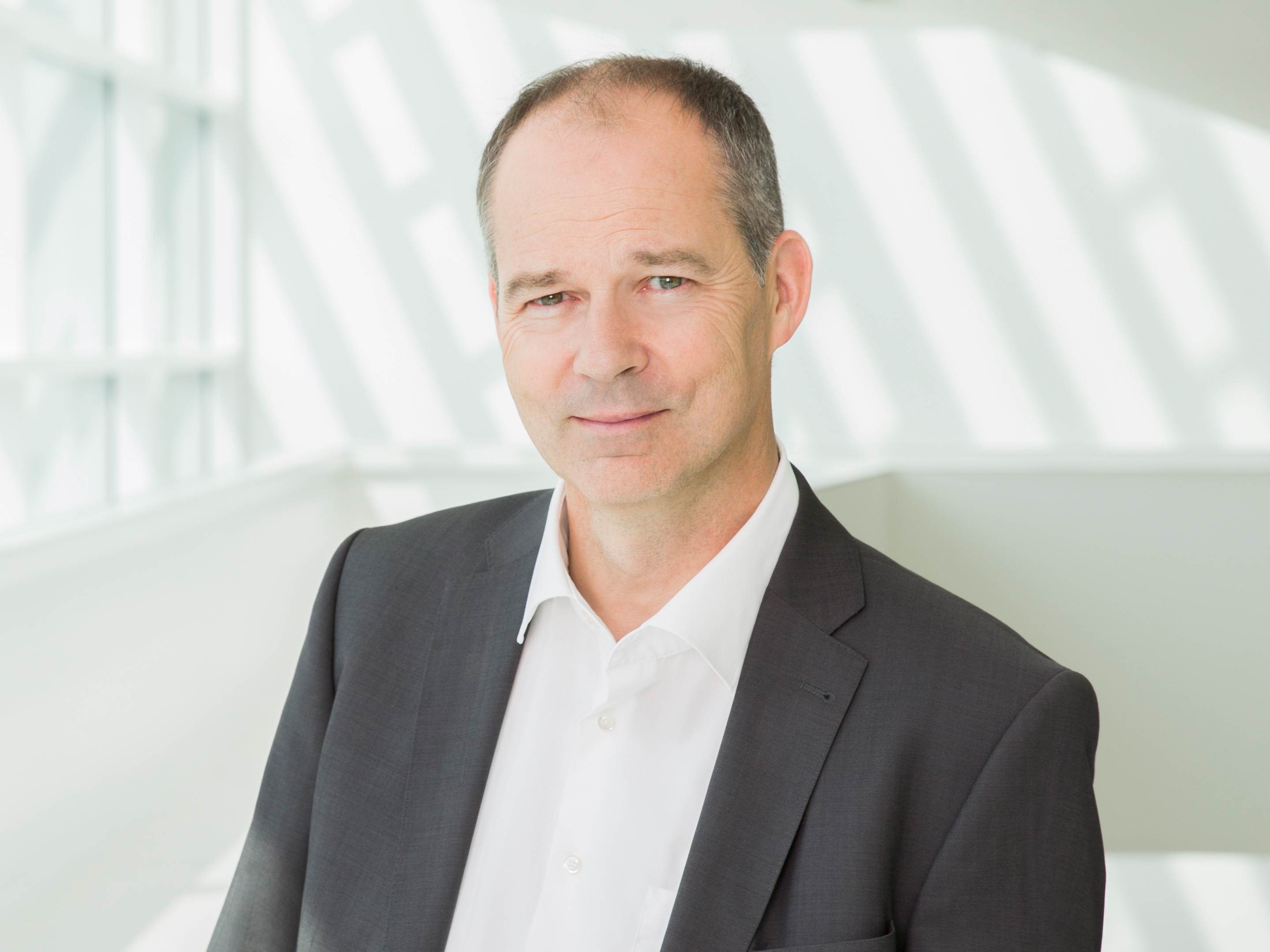
- Christoph Mohn, 2018
- Born: Christoph Scholz; July 6, 1965 (age 61); Stuttgart, Baden-Württemberg, West Germany
- Education: University of Münster
- Occupations: Chairman of the Supervisory Board, Bertelsmann
- Board member of: Chairman of the Executive Board, Reinhard Mohn Foundation; Member of the Board of Trustees, Bertelsmann Stiftung

Christoph Mohn (born July 6, 1965) is a German businessman. In 2013, he became chairman of the supervisory board of Bertelsmann. Since 2021, he has also been Chairman of the Steering Committee of Bertelsmann Verwaltungsgesellschaft (BVG) and has assumed the role of family spokesperson there. Moreover, Mohn chairs the executive board of the Reinhard Mohn Foundation and is on the board of trustees of the Bertelsmann Stiftung.

== Family ==
Mohn is one of six children of media businessman Reinhard Mohn, who died in 2009. Up until 2021, his mother, Liz Mohn, was chairwoman of the Bertelsmann Verwaltungsgesellschaft, representing the fifth generation of the business-owning family. The parents had married in the year 1982, and Reinhard Mohn then adopted their mutual children Brigitte, Christoph and Andreas Mohn.

During his studies, Mohn met Indian mathematician Shobhna. The couple are married and have three daughters.

== Education ==
After earning his German baccalaureate (Abitur) at the Städtisches Gymnasium in Gütersloh, Mohn completed his military service. In 1985, he took up studies in Business Administration, majoring in Marketing, at the University of Münster.

== Career ==
Mohn started his career in 1992 at Bertelsmann Music Group in Hong Kong and New York City. After three years, Mohn switched over to the McKinsey & Company consulting firm in Düsseldorf. There, he monitored trends and developments surrounding the Internet and new media. Mohn returned to Gütersloh in 1996 and worked for the multimedia division at Bertelsmann, which was headed by Thomas Middelhoff at that time. As Vice President of the subsidiary Telemedia, he helped expand the company's online business.

=== Lycos Europe ===
Mohn assisted in establishing a joint venture between Bertelsmann and Lycos, and in 1997, he became chief executive officer (CEO) of Lycos Europe. For a certain period, Lycos Europe was the most successful Internet portal in Europe. Mohn took the company public in the year 2000, and due to a difficult market environment after the dot-com bubble burst, he instituted comprehensive restructuring measures. In 2008, the owners decided to wind up Lycos Europe.

=== Bertelsmann ===
From 2001 to 2007, Mohn was a member of the Bertelsmann Verwaltungsgesellschaft. It controls the voting rights of Mohn family members and foundations having indirect shareholdings in Bertelsmann. After the death of Reinhard Mohn in the year 2009, his son Christoph assumed his position in the Bertelsmann Verwaltungsgesellschaft, now representing the sixth generation of the Mohn family.

Since 2006, Mohn has been a member of the Bertelsmann Supervisory Board, ending speculation about a possible move to the Executive Board. In this way, the family also expanded its influence on Bertelsmann. Finally, in 2013, Mohn became Chairman of the Supervisory Board. In this position, he has been supporting the transformation of the Group, under the leadership of Thomas Rabe, who became CEO in 2012.

In 2021, upon reaching the age of 80 years, Liz Mohn stepped down from the executive bodies of Bertelsmann Verwaltungsgesellschaft. Christoph Mohn then took over the chairmanship of the Steering Committee and the duties of Speaker of the family there.

== Other activities ==
In the year 2009, Mohn became a member of the Board of Trustees of the non-profit Bertelsmann Stiftung. In 2010, he also took over the chairmanship of the Reinhard Mohn Foundation established back in 2006, dedicated to the lifetime achievements of Reinhard Mohn.

As an investor, Mohn also supports start-up companies in their early stages and in building up their business.
