= Mohns =

Mohns is the surname of:

- Arthur Mohns (1896-?), German footballer
- Doug Mohns (1933-2014), Canadian National Hockey League player
- Greg Mohns (1950-2012), executive and coach in the Canadian Football League
- Lloyd Mohns (1921-2005), Canadian who played in one National Hockey League game

== See also ==
- Mohn (disambiguation)
- Mohns Ridge, a mid-ocean ridge in the Greenland Sea - see Greenland Plain
