= Reinhard Mohn Prize =

Internationally renowned award in memory of Reinhard Mohn and Carl Bertelsmann

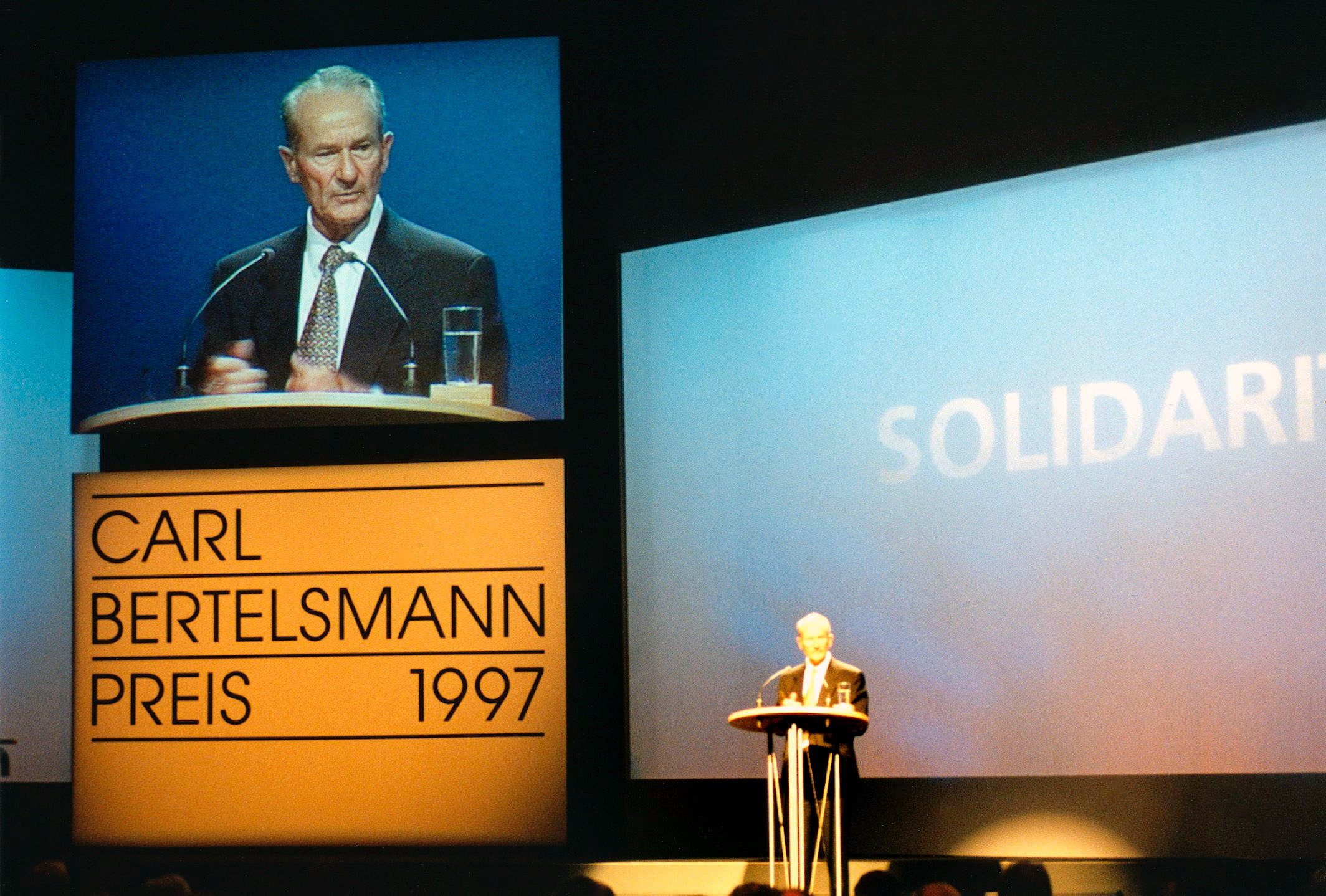
Reinhard Mohn at the presentation of the 1997 Carl Bertelsmann Prize

Carl Bertelsmann Prize 1998 award speech by Al Gore

The Reinhard Mohn Prize has been awarded by the Bertelsmann Stiftung since 2011. It recognizes internationally renowned individuals for their forward-looking solutions to social and political challenges. Given in memory of Reinhard Mohn, who died in 2009, it succeeds the Carl Bertelsmann Prize, which was awarded from 1988 to 2008. The Reinhard Mohn Prize is one of the main responsibilities of Liz Mohn, honorary member of the Bertelsmann Stiftung's board of trustees.

Recipients of the prize include former United Nations Secretary-General Kofi Annan (2013), German President Joachim Gauck (2018), and President of Moldova Maia Sandu (2025).

== History ==
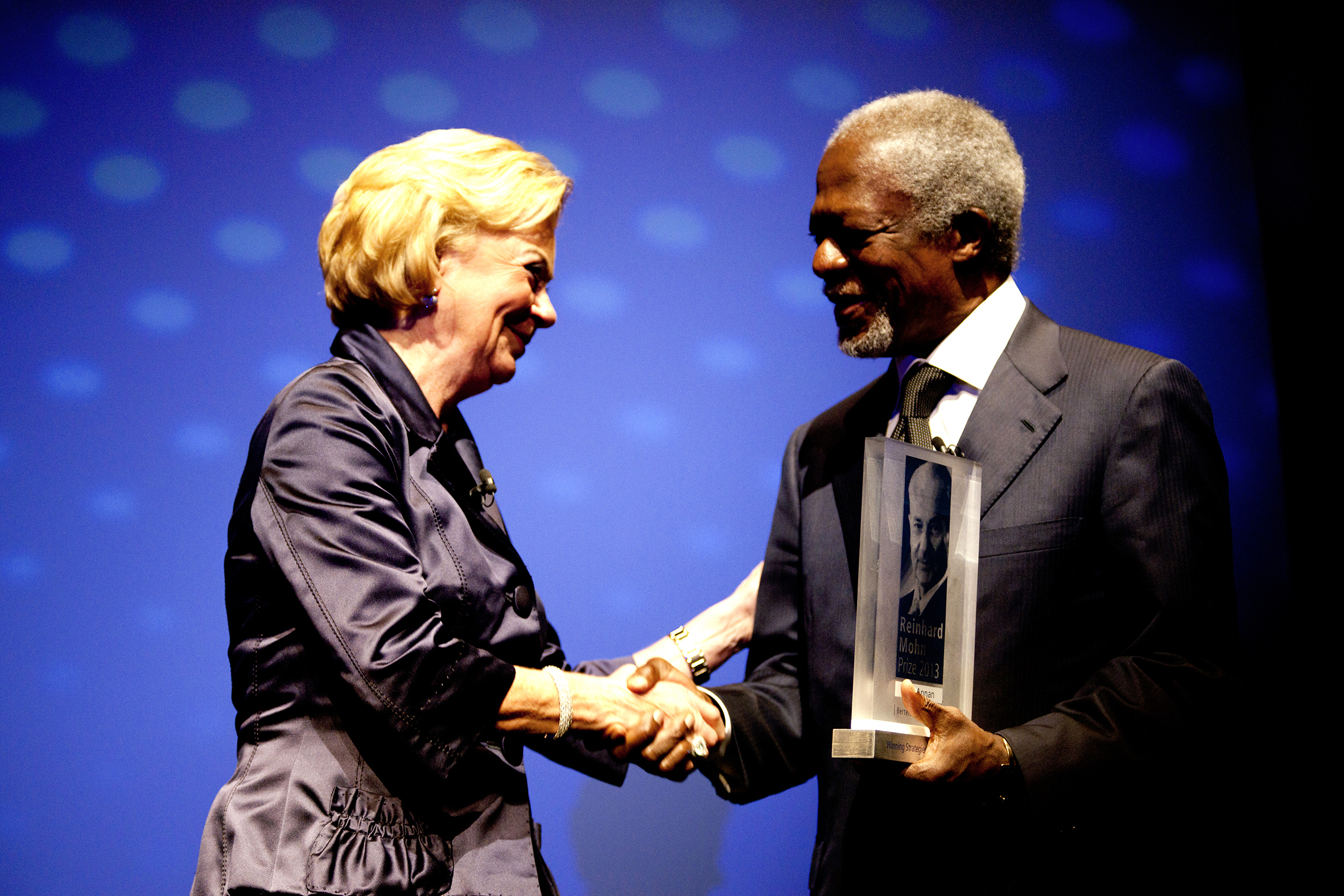
Liz Mohn and Kofi Annan at the 2013 Reinhard Mohn Prize

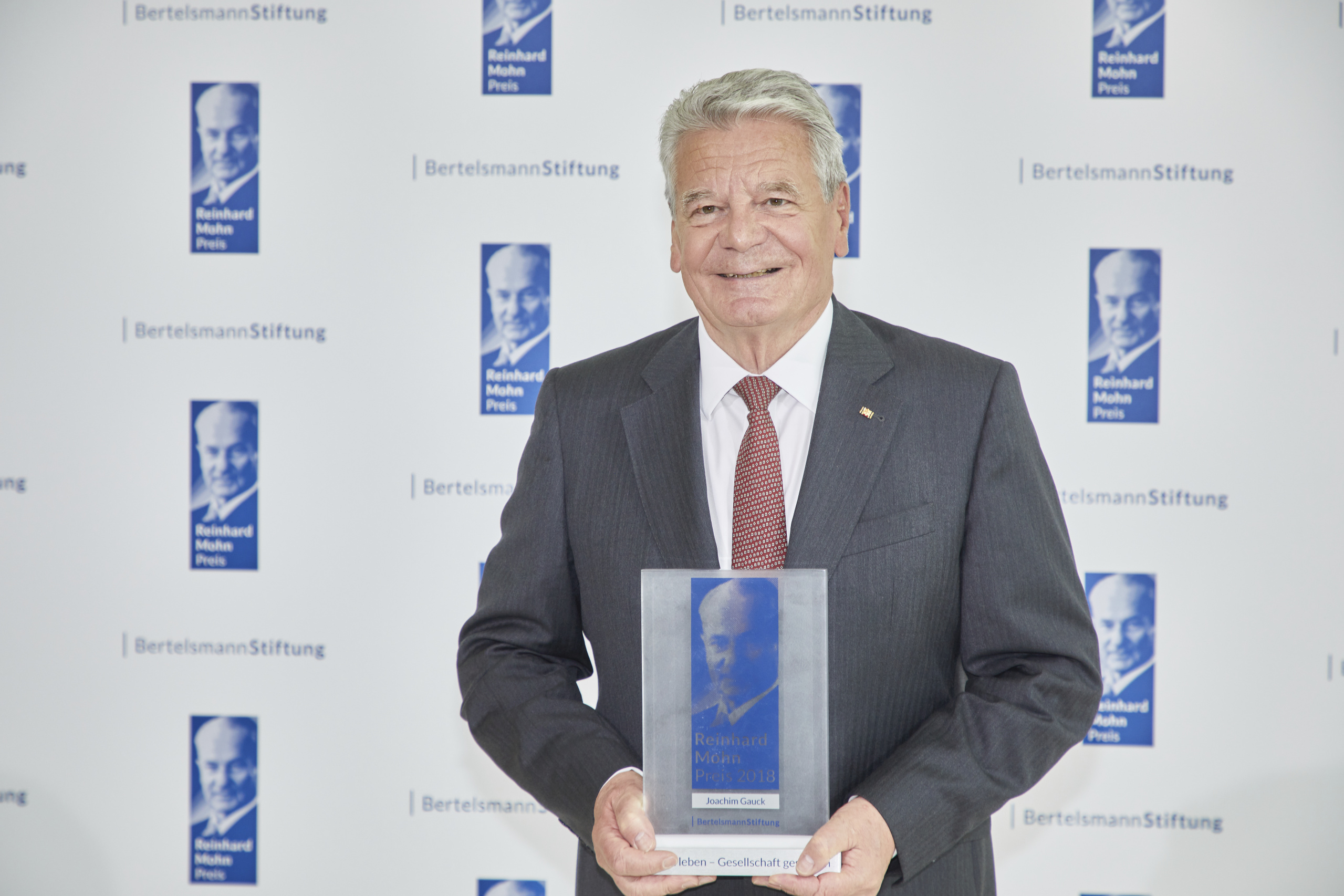
Award ceremony of the 2018 Reinhard Mohn Prize to Joachim Gauck

Reinhard Mohn initiated the Carl Bertelsmann Prize in 1988. At the time, he was chairman of the Bertelsmann Stiftung management board and chairman of the Bertelsmann supervisory board. As laid out in its founding statutes, the prize was meant to identify solutions to socio-political challenges in Germany and beyond. International initiatives and projects played an important role in achieving that goal. As Mohn explained, the Carl Bertelsmann Prize was intended to "stimulate thought processes and promote opportunities for creative people to develop." Prizewinners initially received 300,000 Marks. From the start, the award also envisioned funding for research and model projects.

In its early years, the Carl Bertelsmann Prize focused on employer-employee relations in business organizations and society at large. In 1990, it addressed education policy topics for the first time. In the years that followed, the prize attracted more and more public attention. For example, awarding the prize to the two private English-language television stations Channel 4 and TVW 7 in 1994 produced a resounding media response. The same was true for the prize's recognition of innovative school systems, such as those in Canada and Denmark.

After addressing issues relating to educational, social, business and economic policy, the Carl Bertelsmann Prize focused on health care in 2000. Democratic processes were a topic several times, especially those in Eastern Europe and South America. By awarding the prize to Transparency International, the Bertelsmann Stiftung set an example in the fight against corruption. Over the years, moreover, the Carl Bertelsmann Prize attracted greater attention in the political sphere; among others, Federal Interior Minister Otto Schily (2004), State Premier Jürgen Rüttgers (2005) and Federal President Horst Köhler (2006) all gave presentation speeches at the award ceremony.

In 2008, the Bertelsmann Stiftung management board decided that the prize would be given every two years. The Carl Bertelsmann Prize was not awarded in 2009 as a result. The prize was renamed in honor of Reinhard Mohn the same year, following his death. German Chancellor Angela Merkel spoke at the award ceremony for the first Reinhard Mohn Prize in 2011, recognizing Reinhard Mohn as an "outstanding entrepreneur in post-war German history." While private and public institutions were recognized in the past, individuals have received the award since 2013. The Reinhard Mohn Prize initially focused on civic engagement and direct democracy. Diversity and migration have been recurring issues, a topic the Bertelsmann Stiftung also addressed in the early 1990s.

The Reinhard Mohn Prize is traditionally presented in Gütersloh, North Rhine-Westphalia, where the Bertelsmann Stiftung is based.

== Criticism ==
The awarding of the 1994 Carl Bertelsmann Prize to two private television stations (the Channel 4 of the UK and Seven Network of Australia) was linked to criticism of the regulations governing the German broadcasting system. The German daily newspaper Die Tageszeitung, for example, saw this as an unacceptable conflict of interest, since the Bertelsmann group itself holds an interest in broadcaster RTL. Independently of this, the 1998 Carl Bertelsmann Prize was again used to call for a reorganization of Germany's media oversight authority. The declared goals included "more self-control and user skills."

In 2010, author and journalist Thomas Schuler criticized the awarding of the 2002 Carl Bertelsmann Prize to Transparency International. He accused the Bertelsmann Stiftung of using the award to publicly advocate for greater transparency while not being sufficiently transparent itself.
