= Rieber =

Rieber may refer to:

== People ==
- Hanna Rieber (1927–2014), Romanian-born Israeli actress
- John Ney Rieber, an American comic book writer
- Paul-Christian Rieber (born 1958), a Norwegian business leader
- Torkild Rieber (1882–1968), a Norwegian immigrant to the United States who became chairman of Texaco
- Georg Fredrik Rieber-Mohn (born 1945), a Norwegian judge
- Hallvard Rieber-Mohn (1922–1982), a Norwegian writer and Dominican priest
- Libe Rieber-Mohn (born 1965), a Norwegian politician for the Labour Party

== Other ==
- Rieber & Søn, a Norwegian food manufacturing company
- GC Rieber, a private company that operates within the fields of marine oils, pelts, salt including for agriculture and nutrients.
- GC Rieber Shipping, a Norwegian shipping company based in Bergen, Norway
- Rieber Hall, a student residence at the University of California, Los Angeles
