= Daniela Schwarzer =

German political scientist (born 1973)

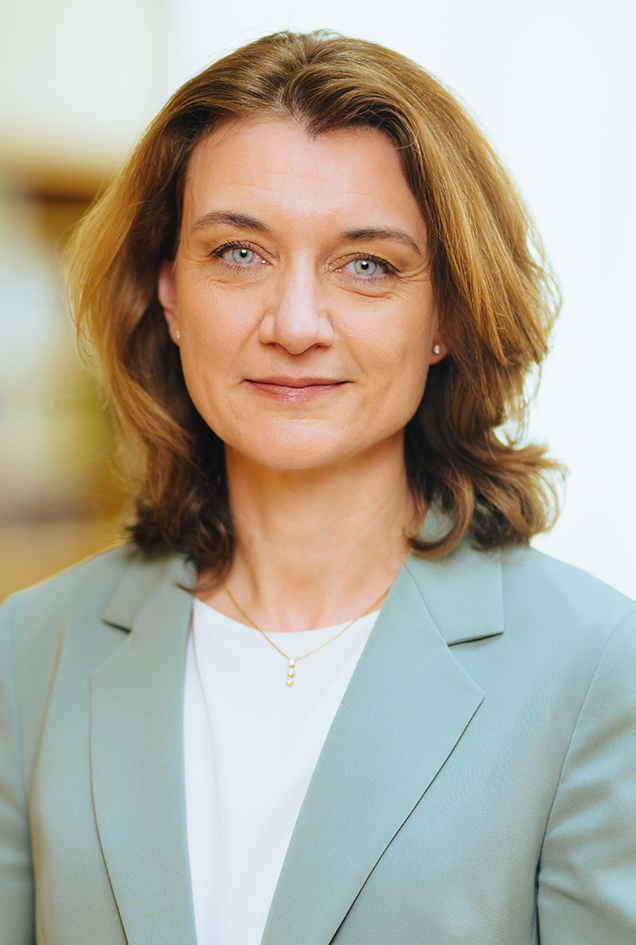
- Daniela Schwarzer, 2023
- Born: 1973 (age 52–53); Hamburg, Germany
- Known for: Honorary Professor, Freie Universität Berlin
- Board member of: Member of the Executive Board, Bertelsmann Stiftung

Daniela Carolin Schwarzer (born 1973) is a German political scientist and has been a member of the Executive Board of the Bertelsmann Stiftung since 2023. She is an expert on European and international affairs and has worked in think tanks, foundations and universities, as well as in journalism.

== Career ==
Schwarzer began her professional career in 1999 as an editor and France correspondent for Financial Times Deutschland in Paris. Between 2004 and 2013, she worked at the German Institute for International and Security Affairs (SWP), where she led the Europe research group starting in 2008. From 2013 to 2016, she served on the executive board of the German Marshall Fund of the United States as Research Director, overseeing the Berlin office and the Europe program.

From 2016 to 2021, Schwarzer was Director and CEO of the German Council on Foreign Relations (DGAP).

From 2021 to 2023, Schwarzer served as Executive Director for Europe and Central Asia at the Open Society Foundations. During that time, she was Special Advisor to Josep Borrell, High Representative and Vice-President of the European Commission, from 2020 to 2022.

In May 2023, Schwarzer became a member of the board at the Bertelsmann Stiftung, a non-profit organization headquartered in Gütersloh. She oversees programs and initiatives focused on the future of Europe, as well as on strengthening democracy and social cohesion. In addition, she has been co-chairing the German-Japanese Forum since 2025.

Schwarzer is regularly consulted as an expert. She was co-rapporteur of the Working Group on Reform and Enlargement of the European Union, convened by the French and German governments, which presented its report in September 2023. She also advised France and Poland during their respective EU Council Presidencies and the Centre d'analyse stratégique (CAS) of the French Prime Minister.

== Academic positions ==
In 2021, Schwarzer was named Honorary Professor of Political Science at the Free University of Berlin. She is affiliated with the Center for European Integration within the Otto Suhr Institute for Political Science. In fall 2022, she was the Pierre Keller Visiting Professor at Harvard University, with which she was already affiliated as a Senior Fellow of the Belfer Center.

== Other activities ==
=== Corporate boards ===
- Covivio, Independent Member of the Board of Directors (since 2022)
- BNP Paribas, Member of the Board of Directors (since 2014)

=== Non-profit organizations ===
- German Council on Foreign Relations (DGAP), Member of the Board
- Institut Jacques Delors, Member of the Advisory Board
- European Council on Foreign Relations (ECFR), Member of the Council

== Work ==
- Krisenzeit: Sicherheit, Wirtschaft, Zusammenhalt – Was Deutschland jetzt tun muss (in German). Piper. 2023. ISBN 978-3-492-07228-1.
- "Demaskiert in einer neuen Welt". Internationale Politik (in German). June 27, 2022.
- Final Call. Wie Europa sich zwischen China und den USA behaupten kann (in German). Campus. 2021. ISBN 978-3-593-51482-6.
- "Smarte Souveränität - 10 Aktionspläne für die künftige Bundesregierung" (in German). Deutsche Gesellschaft für Auswärtige Politik. September 20, 2021.
- Die Europäische Währungsunion. Geschichte, Krise und Reform (in German). Kohlhammer. 2015. ISBN 978-3-17-022946-4.
- Fiscal Policy Co-ordination in the European Monetary Union: A Preference-Based Explanation of Institutional Change. Nomos. 2006. ISBN 3-8329-2428-0.
