= Mohn =

Mohn is a German word for poppy. It may also refer to:

- Mohn (surname), a list of people
- Mohn Basin, Ross Dependency, Antarctica
- Mohn Peaks, two peaks in Palmer Land, Antarctica
- Mohn Islands, in the Kara Sea
- Mohn (Pokémon), a character in Pokémon series.
- Poppy seed filling, also known as Mohn or mon in Yiddish
