= Initiative Neue Soziale Marktwirtschaft =

Neoliberal German lobby group

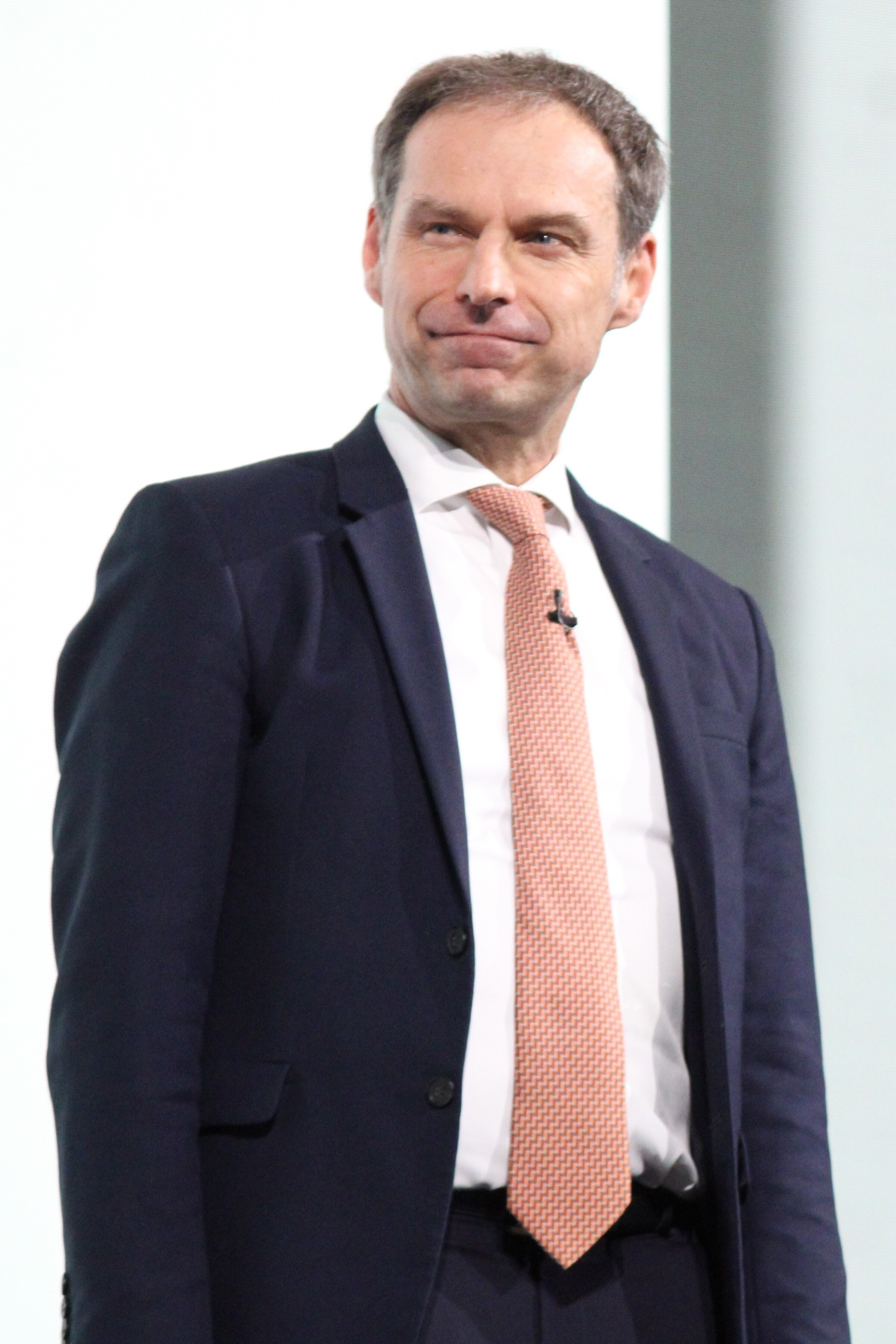
Thorsten Alsleben, managing director since 2023, in 2025

The Initiative Neue Soziale Marktwirtschaft (INSM) – New Social Free Market Initiative – is a neoliberal German think tank and lobby group with headquarters in Berlin that was founded in 2000 by the employers' organization Gesamtmetall. Through professional communication, the INSM tries to create a favorable climate for free-market economic reforms, and entrepreneurship, emphasizing individual responsibility and competitiveness.

Economic and political experts closely associated with the INSM and serving as "INSM ambassadors" include Roland Berger, Arend Oetker, Hans Tietmeyer, Wolfgang Clement, Paul Kirchhof, Oswald Metzger, Silvana Koch-Mehrin, and others. The INSM brand was created by the advertising agency Scholz & Friends, from which the INSM still receives strategic input.

The lobby organisation is known for its public relations work and campaigns. Some of its activities and campaigns, like those during the German federal election campaign of 2021, are subject of controversy and public criticism.

== Organisation ==
=== Structure ===
The sole shareholder of INSM is the German Economic Institute. The institute's supporting associations are the Confederation of German Employers' Associations and the Federation of German Industries.

In 1999, the PR agency berolino.pr GmbH was founded by the employers' associations of the metal and electrical industries, which appeared in public as the Initiative Neue Soziale Marktwirtschaft. Originally based in Cologne, the company headquarters were moved to Berlin in 2010.

The INSM also works with the Allensbach Institute.

=== Budget ===
The INSM's annual budget was around 5,7 million euros in 2024 and comes from employers' associations in the metal and electrical industries.

== Media partnerships ==
INSM has partnered with print media like Wirtschaftswoche, Frankfurter Allgemeine Sonntagszeitung, Die Welt and Handelsblatt but also influences the guest choice for political talkshows; it tries to reach a political audience via influence on TV-series scripts, and to reach young people via content in MTV.

== Campaigns ==
In July 2019, INSM launched a campaign with the aim of redefining how climate change should be tackled. It was built on 12 so-called "facts", arguing essentially that Germany is already doing its share, and that limiting temperature rise to 2 degrees Celsius will be sufficient. These have been analysed by Volker Quaschning, focussing on the orientation of the statement toward preservation of German national industry.

Ahead of the 2021 national elections, INSM launched a campaign in which it portrayed the Green Party's chancellor candidate Annalena Baerbock dressed as a biblical Moses, holding two tablets under the caption "Annalena and the 10 prohibitions." In its campaign, the group attacked the Greens' policies to steer Germans into electric cars and onto trains instead of domestic flights. Its portrayal of Baerbock as Moses met criticism and accusations of anti-Semitism.

== See also ==
- Bertelsmann Stiftung
- Mont Pelerin Society
