= Brigitte Mohn =

German businesswoman and philanthropist

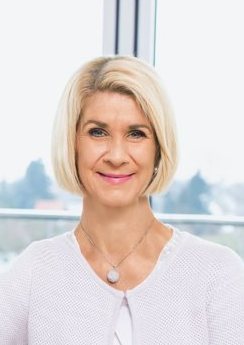
- Mohn in 2016
- Born: Brigitte Scholz; 28 June 1964 (age 62); Stuttgart-Degerloch, Baden-Württemberg, Germany
- Education: University of Bamberg; University of Münster; University of Augsburg
- Occupations: Chairwoman of the Executive Board, Bertelsmann Stiftung
- Board member of: Chairwoman of the Board of Trustees, German Stroke Foundation; Deputy Chairwoman of the Supervisory Board, Phineo; Member of the Supervisory Boards, Bertelsmann group
- Parents: Reinhard Mohn (father); Liz Mohn (mother)
- Relatives: Christoph Mohn (brother)
- Awards: Erika Pitzer Prize, 2018

Brigitte Mohn (née Scholz, born 28 June 1964) is the heiress of Reinhard Mohn and chairwoman of the executive board of the Bertelsmann Stiftung. She is a shareholder of the Bertelsmann Verwaltungsgesellschaft (BVG) and a member of the supervisory boards of the Bertelsmann group. Mohn is also chairwoman of the board of trustees of the German Stroke Foundation.

== Life ==
Mohn is one of six children of the billionaire media entrepreneur Reinhard Mohn, who died in 2009. Her mother, Liz Mohn, chairs the board of her own foundation, the Liz Mohn Stiftung.

After completing her secondary education (Abitur) in 1984, Mohn initially wanted to become a doctor, but decided to study political science, art history and German philology at the universities of Bamberg, Münster and Augsburg. In 1993, she received her doctorate from the Witten-Herdecke University. In 2001, she completed an MBA at Otto Beisheim School of Management in Vallendar, Germany, and the Kellogg School of Management in Evanston, Illinois, United States.

== Career ==
Brigitte Mohn began her career in 1993 as an editor at the Kiel Institute for the World Economy. She then moved to the Bantam Doubleday Dell publishing group in New York City, where she headed the academic marketing department. She also worked in the children's book division of Random House and at the Canadian Doubleday book clubs. From 1997 to 1998, Mohn was a management consultant at McKinsey & Company in Hamburg, Germany, before moving to Switzerland for her job at Pixelpark until 2000.

Mohn entered foundation work at the end of 2000. From 2001 to 2014, she was chairwoman of the executive board of the German Stroke Foundation, which was established by her mother, Liz Mohn, in 1993. In 2014, she took over the chair of the board of trustees.

After joining the Bertelsmann Stiftung in 2002, where she was responsible for the health division, Mohn was appointed to the executive board at the beginning of 2005. She is responsible for the programs covering health, sustainable communities, digitalization, and the common good. On 1 August 2025, she took over as chairwoman of the executive board.

In 2008, Mohn joined the Bertelsmann Verwaltungsgesellschaft, which controls the voting rights at the shareholders' meeting; additionally, she was appointed to the group's supervisory board, where Mohn represents the sixth generation of the owner family.

== Other activities ==
- Phineo, Deputy Chairwoman of the Supervisory Board
- Stiftung RTL – Wir helfen Kindern, Member of the Board of Trustees
- Rhön-Klinikum, Member of the Supervisory Board (2002–2020)

== Awards ==
- 2016: Honorary Prize for Social Entrepreneurship from Ernst & Young
- 2018: Ethics in Business Award of the International Association for Human Values (IAHV)
- 2018: Erika Pitzer Prize of the Willy Robert Pitzer Foundation

== Publications ==
- Brigitte Mohn, Monika Kirschner (2005). Risiko Schlaganfall: kompetent vorbeugen, Alarmsignale erkennen, richtig handeln, Folgen vermeiden (in German). Köln: Egmont VGS. ISBN 3-8025-1696-6.
- Liz Mohn, Brigitte Mohn, Werner Weidenfeld, Johannes Meier (2006). Werte. Was die Gesellschaft zusammenhält (in German). Gütersloh: Verlag Bertelsmann Stiftung. ISBN 3-89204-908-4.
- Brigitte Mohn (2010). "Es gibt Werte, die für mich gesetzt sind". In Stefanie Unger (ed.). Vertrauen ist gut: Werte in der Krise oder Krise der Werte? (in German). Frankfurt am Main: Frankfurter Allgemeine Buch. ISBN 978-3-89981-207-7.
