= Reinhard Mohn =

German businessman and philanthropist

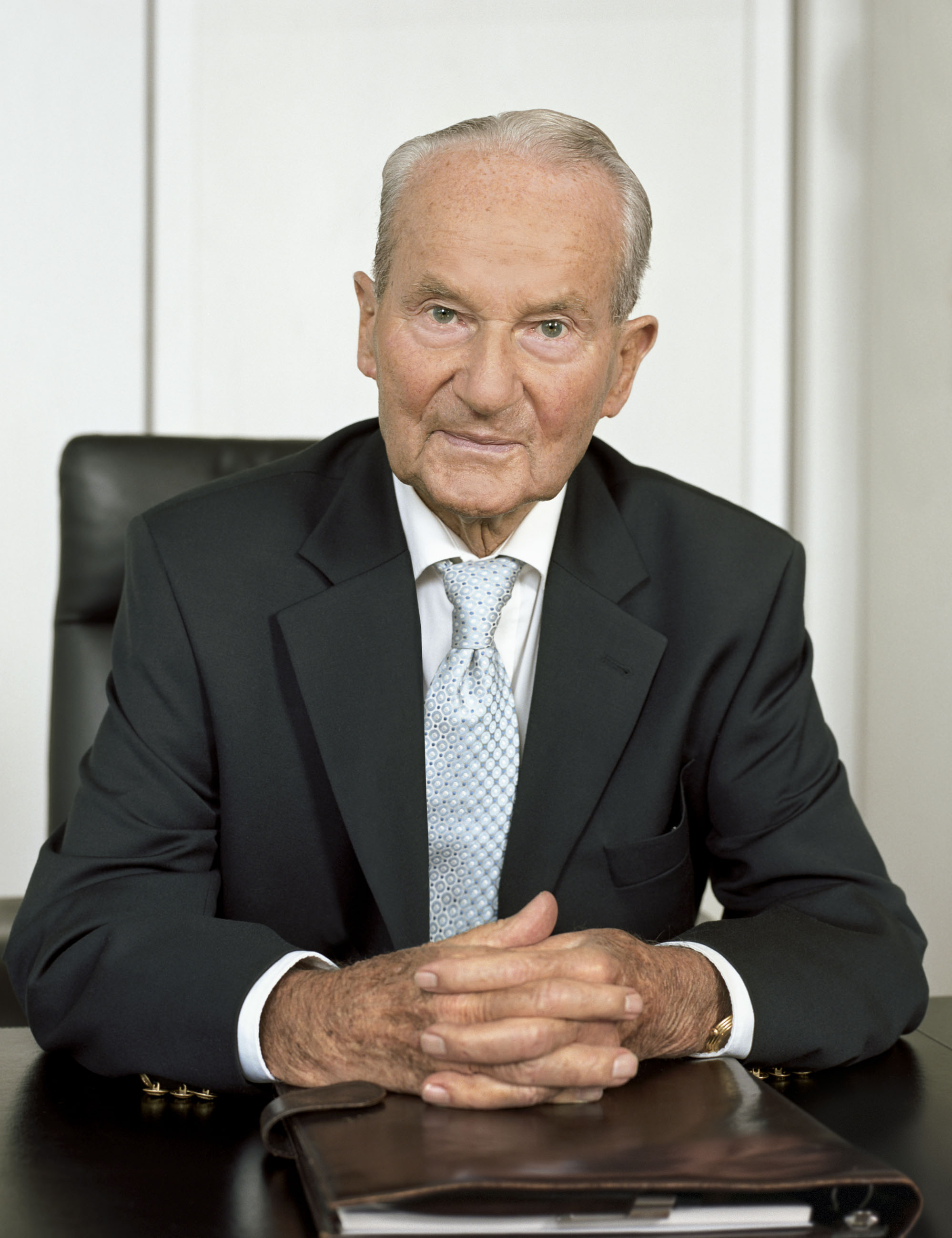
- Mohn in 2008
- Born: 29 June 1921; Gütersloh, Westphalia, Weimar Republic
- Died: 3 October 2009 (aged 88); Steinhagen, North Rhine-Westphalia, Germany
- Occupation: Businessman
- Spouses: Magdalene Raßfeld (m. 1948; div. 1982) Elisabeth Scholz (m. 1982)
- Children: 6

Reinhard Mohn (29 June 1921 – 3 October 2009) was a German billionaire businessman and philanthropist. Under his leadership, Bertelsmann, once a medium-sized printing and publishing house, established in 1835, developed into a global media conglomerate. In 1977, he founded the non-profit foundation Bertelsmann Stiftung, which is today one of the largest foundations in Germany, with worldwide reach.

Mohn received numerous domestic and international awards, including the Knight Commander's Cross of the Order of Merit of the Federal Republic of Germany, and Spain's Prince of Asturias Award.

== Life ==
=== Background ===
Born in 1921 as the fifth child of Agnes Mohn (née Seippel) and Heinrich Mohn, Reinhard represented the fifth generation of the shareholding families of Bertelsmann. In 1887, his grandfather, Johannes Mohn, had taken over the management of the printing and publishing house from his father-in-law, Heinrich Bertelsmann, son of Carl Bertelsmann.

Raised in a strict Protestant family, Mohn earned his German baccalaureate (Abitur) at the Evangelisch Stiftische Gymnasium Gütersloh in 1939 and went on to complete his Reichsarbeitsdienst, the official labor service of the Third Reich. Afterwards, he volunteered for military service with the Luftwaffe, originally with the aim of becoming a pilot. After serving in an air-base command on the Western Front, Mohn was stationed with an anti-aircraft unit, advancing in rank from private to sergeant, and in 1942 achieving the rank of lieutenant. From France, via Italy, his regiment was moved to Tunisia. On 5 May 1943, Mohn became a U.S. prisoner of war, and in mid-June, he was taken across the Atlantic to Camp Concordia, an internment center in Kansas for German prisoners of war. According to Mohn's accounts, he was profoundly influenced by this experience; as one example, he began reading American management literature for the first time.

In January 1946, Reinhard Mohn returned to Gütersloh. His oldest brother, Hans Heinrich Mohn, had died in 1939, and Sigbert Mohn, his second-oldest brother, was still a prisoner of war. Reinhard initially took an apprenticeship as a bookseller, and later joined his father's business. His father, Heinrich Mohn, had come under the scrutiny of British occupation authorities because he was a supporting member of the SS, because he had donated to other Nazi organizations, and for other reasons. In April 1947, Heinrich Mohn transferred his publishing license to his son Reinhard, who managed the publishing business from then on.

=== Family ===
In 1948, Mohn married Magdalene Raßfeld, whom he knew from his school days. The couple had three children: Johannes, Susanne and Christiane; they divorced in 1982. Later that year, Mohn married Elisabeth Scholz, with whom he had had an affair since the 1950s and fathered three children in the 1960s. After the wedding, Mohn adopted their three mutual children: Brigitte, Christoph and Andreas.

== Career ==
=== Bertelsmann ===
In 1947, Mohn took over the management of the C. Bertelsmann publishing company, which had been largely destroyed by bombing raids during World War II. In 1950, he established the Bertelsmann Lesering book club, which formed the basis for the fast growth of the company in the decades that followed. From the beginning, he closely involved employees, e.g. through the loan participation program introduced in 1951. In 1969, he launched an employee profit-sharing model, viewed as exemplary throughout Germany. As a businessman, Mohn was consistent in his efforts to grow the traditional publishing business into a media conglomerate: Thus, he entered music and film production, invested in the magazine business, and promoted international expansion. A merger of Bertelsmann with the Axel Springer group planned in the years 1969/70 did not come to fruition.

In 1971, Mohn transformed the family company into a joint stock corporation. In this way, he created another structural prerequisite for Bertelsmann's rise to one of the world's leading media groups. Mohn became chairman of the executive board, and in this position continued a corporate culture based on partnership, the essential component of which involves dialogue between management and employees. In 1976, he had a new corporate headquarters built, where Bertelsmann's home offices are still located today. During this time, Mohn also began an entry into the U.S. publishing business, of vital importance to Bertelsmann. The acquisition of Bantam Books (1977/1980) and Doubleday (1986) created the largest trade-book publishing group in the United States, at the time.

In 1981, Mohn moved from the executive board to the supervisory board, which he chaired for another ten years, still remaining involved in business operations. At 70, he finally stepped down from his duties, and remained honorary chairman of the supervisory board. From then on, he dedicated his efforts primarily to the Bertelsmann Stiftung foundation. In 1999, Mohn transferred his sole control over the voting rights of roughly 90% of Bertelsmann shares to the Bertelsmann Verwaltungsgesellschaft, a move designed to ensure the continuity of his company.

=== Bertelsmann Stiftung ===
In 1977, Mohn established the non-profit Bertelsmann Stiftung, initially endowed with capital of 100,000 Deutsche Mark. Mohn supported the management-driven concept of an operating foundation, independently developing and managing projects. He directed the Bertelsmann Stiftung to help fund the improvement of the Gütersloh City Library and established the Carl Bertelsmann Prize (today the Reinhard Mohn Prize).

In the 1980s, the Bertelsmann Stiftung became the key focus of Mohn's corporate citizenship activities. In 1993, the majority of shareholdings in Bertelsmann was transferred to the foundation, making the Bertelsmann Stiftung the largest shareholder in the group. Capital shares and voting rights were strictly separated in the gift agreement, so that neither the foundation nor the group can exert any significant controlling influence over the other.

Mohn massively increased the Bertelsmann Stiftung's budget in the 1990s. In addition to projects in Germany, he supported projects in Spain, such as the Fundació Biblioteca d'Alcúdia Can Torró on Mallorca. In 1995, he founded the Fundación Bertelsmann, now based in Barcelona and Madrid, as an independent subsidiary foundation that works to promote dual training to reduce youth unemployment. Founded in 2008, the Bertelsmann Foundation North America, headquartered in Washington, D.C., deals with transatlantic cooperation, among other issues.

In the early years, the founder was the sole Executive Board member of the Bertelsmann Stiftung. In 1979, a managing director was hired; from 1983, Mohn was supported by an Advisory Board, and in 1993, the Executive Board was also expanded. After 1998, Mohn withdrew from executive management: Initially, he stepped down from his position as Chairman of the Executive Board, and a year later also withdrew as the Chairman of the Advisory Board. As a result of several structural and personnel changes, Mohn held the interim chairmanship of both Bertelsmann Stiftung executive bodies again from the end of 2000 until mid-2001, when he was succeeded by Gunter Thielen as Chairman of the Executive Board. In 2004, he permanently stepped down from the Executive Board of the Bertelsmann Stiftung, but as the founder, according to the statutes, he remained a member of the Board of Trustees until he died in 2009.

== Honors (selection) ==
- 1981: Honorary Citizen of the City of Gütersloh
- 1987: Friend of the City of Jerusalem, awarded at the Jerusalem Book Fair
- 1992: Induction into the symbolic Hall of Fame of Manager Magazine
- 1994: Commander's Cross of the Order of Merit of the Federal Republic of Germany
- 1996: Europäischer Stifterpreis (a European Culture Award)
- 1996: Honorary Member of the Club of Rome
- 1997: Schumpeter Prize
- 1998: Knight Commander's Cross of the Order of Merit of the Federal Republic of Germany
- 1998: Prince of Asturias Award
- 1998: Gold Medal of the Association of German Foundations
- 1998: Integration Award of the foundation Apfelbaum Stiftung
- 1998: Hanns Martin Schleyer Prize
- 1999: State Prize of North Rhine-Westphalia
- 1999: Spanish Grand Cross of the Order of Civil Merit
- 2000: Bernhard Harms Medal
- 2000: Jakob Fugger Medal
- 2001: Honorary Doctorate from the University of Münster
- 2002: Future Prize of the CDU Social Committees
- 2003: Teddy Kollek Award of the Jerusalem Foundation
- 2005: Honorary Citizen of the City of Alcúdia, Mallorca
- 2007: German Entrepreneur Award for his lifetime achievement
- 2010 (posthumous): Gold Medal of the Balearic Islands

== Published works ==
From the late 1980s on, Reinhard Mohn was also involved in journalistic activities as an essayist and nonfiction book author. He wrote several books and magazine articles in which he dealt with topics concerning society and business. In 1985, he published an essay on "Vanity in the Life of the Executive", in which he decried the archetype of a self-centered managerial class. With his statements on this topic, Mohn's perspectives repeatedly drew controversy. In 1986, with the worldwide publication of his book "Success through Partnership", he laid out the principles of corporate culture at Bertelsmann. In "Humanity Wins", published in 2000, he strongly advocated an executive style in a spirit of partnership as a paradigm of a modern organizational structure. "An Age of New Possibilities" from 2001, defined a regulatory framework, which at its core is defined by entrepreneurship. In 2008, his last work was published as "A Global Lesson", in which Mohn provided an autobiographical account of the formative elements of his own life. It was written with author Andrea Stoll, who also wrote the script to the film "Es müssen mehr Köpfe ans Denken kommen" (More minds need to start thinking) from Roland Suso Richter. This film was the gift from the Bertelsmann Executive Board to Mohn on his 85th birthday in 2006.

== Miscellaneous ==
In 1991, on the 70th birthday of Reinhard Mohn, the Bertelsmann Executive Board established a Reinhard Mohn Endowed Chair for Corporate Governance, Business Ethics and Social Evolution at the private University of Witten/Herdecke.

In 2006, Mohn created the Reinhard Mohn Foundation, an eponymous foundation bearing his name, which has been run since 2010 by his son, Christoph Mohn. After the senior Mohn's death, the foundation gained shareholdings in Bertelsmann, which Reinhard Mohn had held via an intermediary company.

In 2010, the University of Witten/Herdecke honored Mohn by establishing an Institute for Corporate Management and Corporate Governance, today known as the Reinhard Mohn Institute of Management. It also houses the Reinhard Mohn Chair of Management, endowed in 1991, and two professorships, one for strategy and organization and one for research.

In 2011, the Bertelsmann Stiftung awarded the first Reinhard Mohn Prize, which upholds and advances the tradition of the Carl Bertelsmann Prize. This award honors internationally renowned individuals for forward-looking solutions to societal and political challenges.

== Criticism ==
Mohn was criticized for how he dealt with the National Socialist past of Bertelsmann. After questions arose in the 1990s as to the company's role in the Third Reich, Bertelsmann, with the support of Mohn, established an independent historical commission, seeking to come to terms with its involvement in the Nazi era. The commission presented its final report in 2002 and found that the decades-long account of its alleged involvement in a publishing company for the resistance could not be substantiated. On the contrary, Bertelsmann was the largest book producer for the Wehrmacht.

In 2010, author and journalist Thomas Schuler criticized a "tax-saving interrelationship" between Bertelsmann and the foundation Bertelsmann Stiftung. The structures set up by Mohn were alleged to have saved his family billions in inheritance tax. However, this tax would not have been owed, according to the prevailing legal view at that time.

== See also ==
- List of billionaires
