= Trond Mohn =

Norwegian businessman and philanthropist

- Born: 3 April 1943 (age 82); Buckie, Scotland
- Education: University of Mannheim
- Spouse: Mette Mortmansgård
- Children: 3, including Louise Mohn

Trond Mohn (born 3 April 1943) is a Norwegian billionaire businessman and philanthropist. He is the owner and chief executive officer (CEO) of the family-owned company Frank Mohn AS.

== Early life ==
Trond Mohn is the son of Frank Mohn (1916–2002) and Eva Wigum (1920–1982). Mohn earned a degree in economics at the University of Mannheim, Germany in 1970.

== Career ==
He returned to Bergen to work for the family company, and became CEO in January 1986. He is the Honorary Consul for the Republic of Korea in Norway.

== Philanthropy ==
Mohn has made numerous donations for sports, medicine and research, primarily in Bergen but also in Tromsø and Haugesund/Karmøy. He is widely admired in Bergen for his generosity; in 2010 he was voted as "the Best Bergenser" ('Bergenser' being a colloquial term for a citizen of Bergen), the first time such a vote was arranged.

The Bergen Research Foundation was established in 2004 through a donation of NOK 250 million by Trond Mohn. The foundation supports research at the University of Bergen as well as Haukeland University Hospital. Mohn has given NOK 400 million to create the Tromsø Research foundation which aims to provide funding and support for long-term research and research-promoting activities at the University of Tromsø.

== Family ==
Mohn is married to Mette Mortmansgård and they have three children: Christine Mohn, Louise Mohn and Fredrik Wilhelm Mohn. They live in Bergen, where his business is based.
