= Louise Mohn =

Norwegian businesswoman (born 1974)

Louise Mohn (born 14 January 1974) is a Norwegian businesswoman who is the founder and chief executive officer of Luzmon Medical Technology.

She established Luzmon Medical Technology in 2016.

== Biography ==
Mohn was born to a philanthropist and businessman, Trond Mohn, and his wife, Mette, in Bergen, Norway, and immediately took an interest in sport. By the age of 15, she was playing basketball at a national level for five different basketball teams. Her training schedule caught up with her, and she started experiencing injuries and muscle pain. She was forced to give up basketball as her health further deteriorated, leaving her with chronic pain. Mohn refused risky surgery and pain medication. Within the next ten years, she went through different medical evaluations and simultaneously tried various treatments, including physiotherapy, ultrasound, and laser to no avail.

By chance, she came across cTEMS at a clinic in Oslo, Norway, and it proved to be the solution to her condition. After six months of treatments, she was pain-free and able to sleep through the night.

In November 2004, she opened The Luzmon Clinic in Kensington, London, acting as a distributor for cTEMS passive exercise.

In 2008, not content with existing equipment, the company invested heavily in research and development in new electrodes. After two years of investments in the UK, the pad prototype developed was unsuccessful, and Mohn decided to end her distribution agreement for the equipment. Consequently, she closed the clinic and went on to pursue further research and development in Norway.

In 2008, Mohn was examined by doctors at Haukeland University Hospital, Bergen, after experiencing episodes with potential cardiac symptoms. The medical team was positively surprised by her physical performance during the tests and her physique was primarily due to the result of cTEMS. Mohn turned over documentation from 10 000 treatment sessions in London to a medical team at Haukeland University Hospital who began designing a program of clinical trials.

Luzmon Medical is now working to create technology that can treat pain, nerve, and muscle problems.
