= Hallvard Rieber-Mohn =

Norwegian Dominican priest and author

Hallvard Rieber-Mohn (2 October 1922 – 4 August 1982) was a Norwegian Dominican priest and author.

== Biography ==
He was born in Molde in Møre og Romsdal, Norway. His parents were Christian Joachim Rieber-Mohn (1891–1959) and Sophie Amalie Rosendahl (1892–1963). Rieber-Mohn grew up in Hamar, where his father was an editor of Hamar Stiftstidende. Rieber-Mohn was a student at Saulchoir, the Dominican school of theology in Paris from 1945 to 1953. He was then assigned by the Roman Catholic Diocese of Oslo to St. Dominican Church and Monastery at Neuberggata 15 in the neighborhood of Majorstuen in Oslo.

Rieber-Mohn was an official spokesman for the Roman Catholic Church in Norway. From 1959 to 1966, he was the editor of the magazine St. Olav. Besides being a columnist at Arbeiderbladet (now Dagsavisen), Rieber-Mohn was a regular contributor on NRK radio programs. Rieber-Mohn debuted as an author in 1959 with a study of French poet and dramatist Paul Claudel (1868–1955). In 1982, he completed an essay featuring Norwegian author Sigrid Undset (1882–1949).

He won the Riksmål Society Literature Prize (Riksmålsforbundets litteraturpris) in 1967 and in 1982 he was awarded the Fritt Ord Award.

== Selected works ==
- Paul Claudel, 1956
- Det blodige nei. Tyske skjebner fra Weimar til Bonn, 1967
- Forrædere? Streiflys over landssvikets problem, 1969
- Sideblikk, 1970
- Midt på treet, 1972
- Ossietzky, 1974
- Reisegleder. Streiftog i land og sinn, 1975
- Menneske først – kristen så, 1976
- Fra politikk til forbrytelse, 1977
- Alvorets glede, 1978
- Dagbokblad, 1982
- Sten på sten. Fem blikk på Sigrid Undset, 1982

Awards
Preceded by Andrey Sakharov	Recipient of the Fritt Ord Award; 1982 (shared with Lech Wałęsa)	Succeeded by Kjetil Bang-Hansen
