= Liz Mohn =

German businesswoman and philanthropist

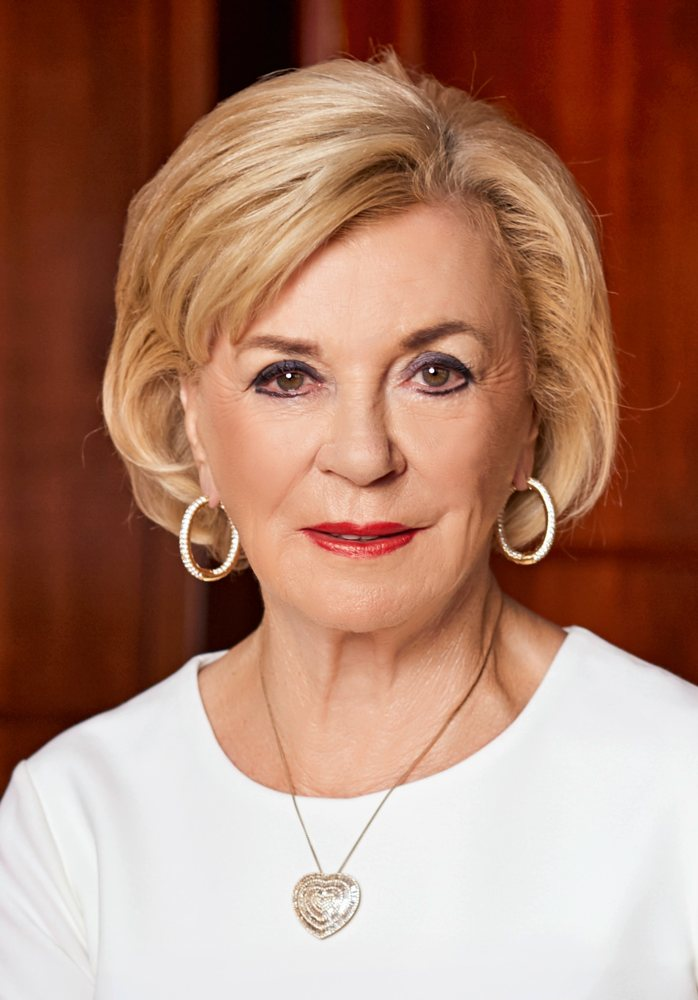
- Born: Elisabeth Beckmann; 21 June 1941 (age 85); Wiedenbrück, North Rhine-Westphalia, Germany
- Spouses: Joachim Scholz (m. 1963; div. 1982) Reinhard Mohn (m. 1982; died 2009)
- Children: 3, including Brigitte and Christoph

Elisabeth Mohn (née Beckmann; born 21 June 1941) is the widow of German billionaire Reinhard Mohn. She was married to him until his death in 2009.

Her late husband, Reinhard Mohn, represents the fifth generation of the family that founded and continues to play a leading role at the Bertelsmann media group. Until 2021, she was chairwoman of the steering committee of the Bertelsmann Verwaltungsgesellschaft (BVG), and remains a committee member to this day. She is also a member of the governance bodies at Bertelsmann. Moreover, until June 2021 Liz Mohn was vice chairwoman of the executive board and board of trustees of the non-profit Bertelsmann Stiftung and since then has been an honorary member of the board of trustees.

The Liz Mohn Center bundled her projects promoting international understanding, on business topics with a focus on issues of modern management, along with those in the cultural field. Mohn has been recognized with numerous awards for her extensive civic engagement, among them the Grand Cross of the Order of Merit of the Federal Republic of Germany.

== Life ==
After completing her schooling, Mohn began an apprenticeship as a dental hygienist. She later applied to become a telephone operator at Bertelsmann and subsequently worked for the company's book club. At the age of 17 she met Reinhard Mohn. In 1963, she married the editor Joachim Scholz; the couple separated in 1978. In 1982, Reinhard Mohn's first marriage ended in divorce. Liz and Reinhard Mohn married the same year. He adopted their biological children Brigitte Mohn, Christoph Mohn and Andreas Mohn.

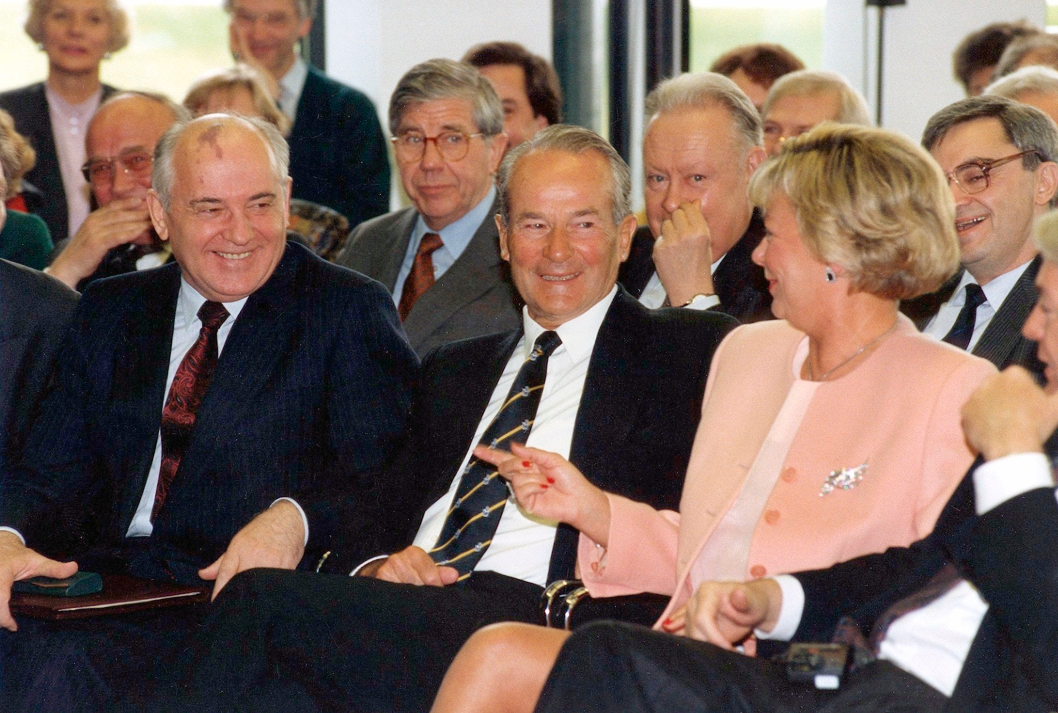
Liz Mohn, Reinhard Mohn and Mikhail Gorbachev (1992)

In the following years, Liz Mohn gradually began playing a greater role at the company and foundation. In 1986, she joined the Bertelsmann Stiftung's advisory council. In 1999, she was asked to become a member of the shareholders' meeting of Bertelsmann Verwaltungsgesellschaft, which controls the voting rights at the media group's annual general meeting. In 2000, she also joined the executive committee of the Bertelsmann Stiftung; the foundation indirectly holds a majority of shares in the Bertelsmann group. In 2002, Mohn advanced to the top position at Bertelsmann Verwaltungsgesellschaft, where she also became the family spokesperson; in addition, she joined the supervisory board at Bertelsmann. With that, she took on a leading role overseeing the company.

Liz Mohn became her husband's successor upon his death in 2009. Among other rights, Reinhard Mohn had granted her a veto at Bertelsmann Verwaltungsgesellschaft. She was also awarded a majority of the founder's rights at the Bertelsmann Stiftung, which allows her, for example, to propose members for the board of trustees.

As a result of her dual role at the company and the foundation, Liz Mohn has received considerable media attention. Upon reaching the age threshold of 80 years, in the year 2021 she handed over the chairmanship in the steering committee at the Bertelsmann Verwaltungsgesellschaft to Christoph Mohn. In addition, she stepped down from the executive board of the Bertelsmann Stiftung. Liz Mohn continues to serve as president of the board of trustees of the Fundación Bertelsmann and president of the board of directors of the Bertelsmann Foundation North America. Both are foundations belonging to the Bertelsmann Stiftung, yet act legally independently.

== Philanthropy ==
In 1987, Mohn launched the Neue Stimmen International Singing Competition. She was inspired to do so by Herbert von Karajan, who noted that too little was being done to promote new opera talent. Organized by the Bertelsmann Stiftung, the competition has since become an internationally recognized forum for discovering up-and-coming opera singers. In addition, Mohn initiated a project in 1999 for promoting music appreciation and education among children, especially in primary schools.

In 1992, she founded the nonprofit German Stroke Foundation, which works to prevent and increase awareness of stroke. She was motivated to do so by a medical condition affecting one of her sons which caused symptoms that resembled a stroke. Mohn is president of the foundation and her daughter Brigitte serves as chairwoman of its board of trustees. A key activity in this area is the Roseball, at which Mohn collects donations to be used for fighting the illness.

In 2005, Mohn expanded her efforts to promote music appreciation and education by establishing the Liz Mohn Foundation for Culture and Music. She serves as the chairwoman of its executive board. The foundation carries out numerous activities: staging musicals for children and young people, for example, and awarding scholarships to opera singers. To achieve its goals, the foundation partners with the Berlin State Opera and other organizations. In addition, it hosts the annual idea initiative "Cultural Diversity with Music".

== Awards and honors ==
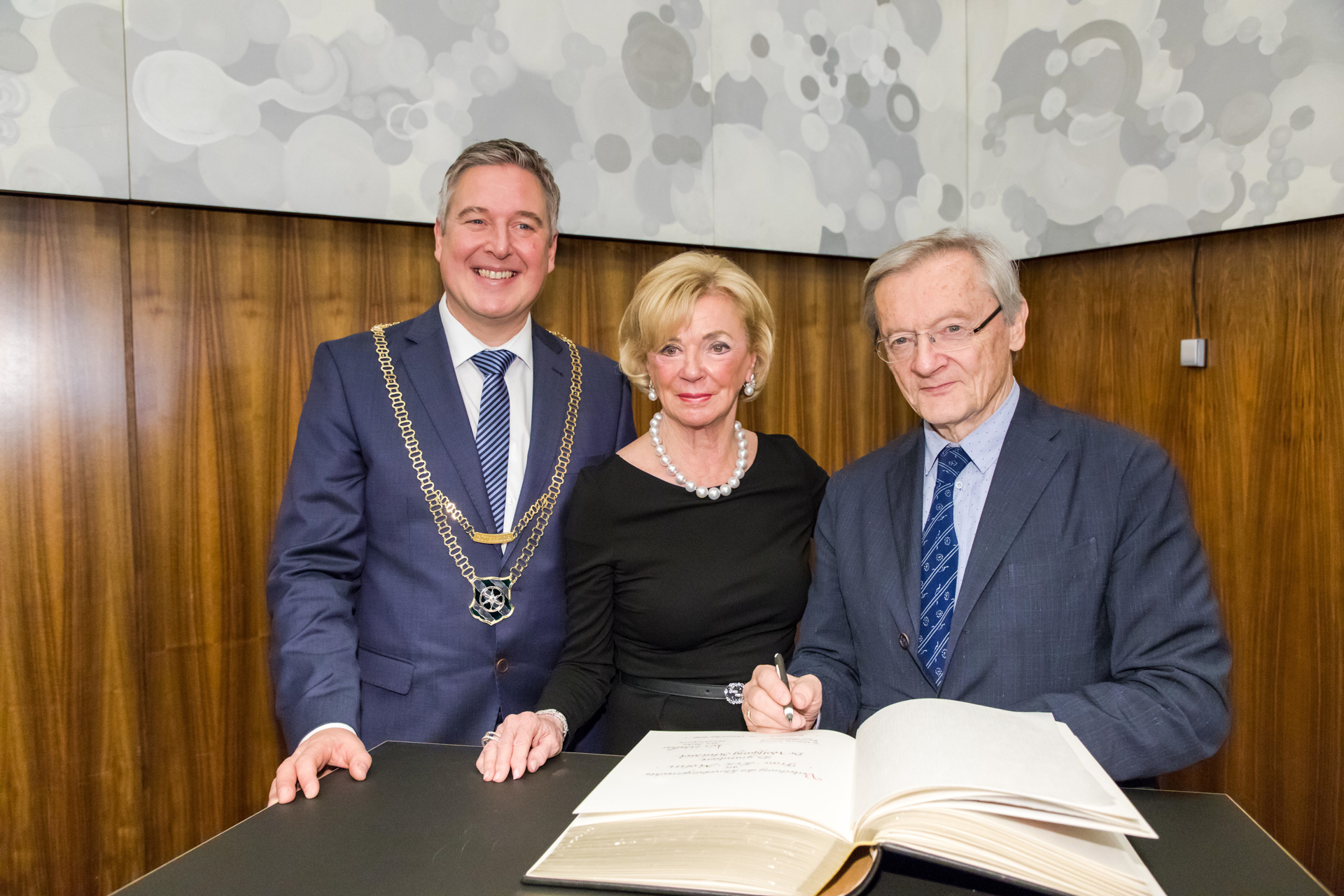
Liz Mohn, becoming honorary citizen of Gütersloh, with mayor Henning Schulz and Wolfgang Schüssel (2016)

Liz Mohn has been recognized numerous times for her social engagement. In 1996, she was awarded the European Philanthropy Prize, the Grand Cross of the Order of Merit of the Federal Republic of Germany, and the Charity Bambi. In 1999, she was the first woman from Germany to become a full member of the Club of Rome. In 2000, she received the German Medical Association's Badge of Honor. In 2006, the University of Tel Aviv awarded her an honorary doctorate. In 2008, she received UNESCO's Children in Need award. In 2009, she was the first woman to be honored with the Karl Winnacker Prize, and she received the Global Economy Prize in 2010. In 2013, Maurice Gourdault-Montagne, France's ambassador to Germany, made her an officer of the French Legion of Honor. In 2014, she received the Euriade Badge of Honor in Gold from Queen Silvia of Sweden. In 2016, Xavier Bettel, prime minister of Luxemburg, awarded her the Commander's Cross of the Order of the Oak Crown.

In 2016, the Gütersloh city council made Mohn honorary citizen of the city.

== Publications ==
- Liz Mohn (2001). Liebe öffnet Herzen (in German). München: C. Bertelsmann Verlag. ISBN 3-570-00367-1.
- Liz Mohn, ed. (2006). Werte: Was die Gesellschaft zusammenhält (in German). Gütersloh: Verlag Bertelsmann Stiftung. ISBN 3-89204-908-4.
- Liz Mohn; Ursula von der Leyen, eds. (2007). Familie gewinnt: Die Allianz und ihre Wirkungen für Unternehmen und Gesellschaft (in German). Gütersloh: Verlag Bertelsmann Stiftung. ISBN 978-3-89204-927-2.
- Liz Mohn; Karin Schlautmann, eds. (2010). Positionen: Unternehmenskultur und Werte (in German). Gütersloh: Verlag Bertelsmann Stiftung. ISBN 978-3-86793-229-5.
- Liz Mohn (2011). Schlüsselmomente: Erfahrungen eines engagierten Lebens (in German). München: C. Bertelsmann Verlag. ISBN 978-3-570-10110-0.
