= Bertelsmann Stiftung =

German independent foundation

Coordinates: 51°54′30″N 8°25′09″E

- Named after: Carl Bertelsmann
- Formation: 1977; 49 years ago
- Founder: Reinhard Mohn
- Headquarters: Gütersloh, Germany
- Key people: Brigitte Mohn (Chair of the Executive Board); Daniela Schwarzer; Wilhelm-Friedrich Uhr
- Main organ: Executive Board (Vorstand)
- Subsidiaries: Fundación Bertelsmann; Bertelsmann Foundation
- Revenue: €163 million (2023)
- Expenses: €75.6 million (2023)
- Website: bertelsmann-stiftung.de

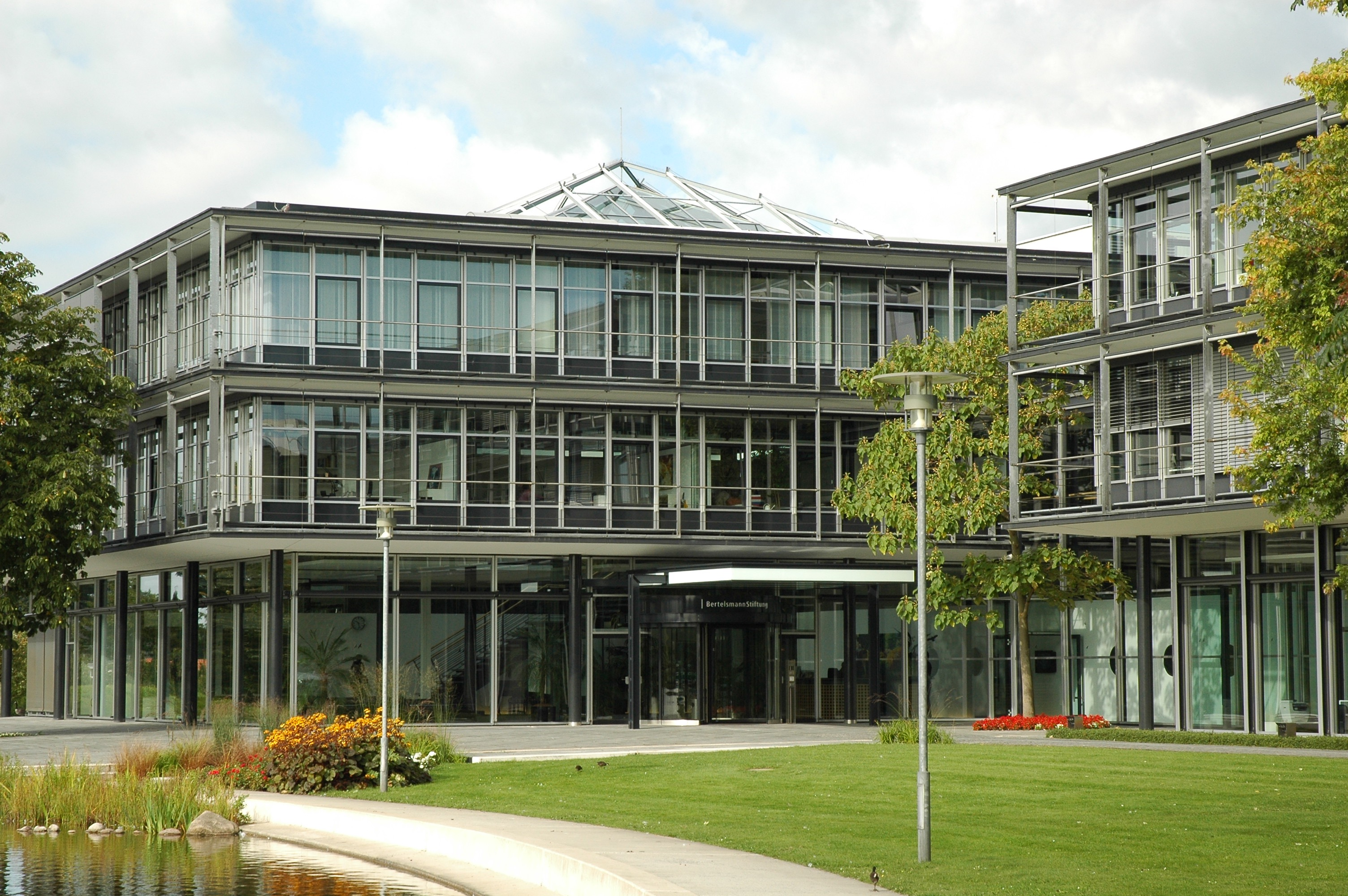
Headquarters of the Bertelsmann Stiftung in Gütersloh (2007)

The Bertelsmann Stiftung is an independent foundation under private law, based in Gütersloh, Germany. It was founded in 1977 by Reinhard Mohn as the result of social, corporate and fiscal considerations. The foundation states that it promotes "reform processes" and "the principles of entrepreneurial activity" to build a "future-oriented society".

Since 1993, the Bertelsmann Stiftung has held the majority of capital shares in the Bertelsmann Group. It holds 80.9% together with the Reinhard Mohn Stiftung and the BVG Stiftung but has no voting rights.

== History ==
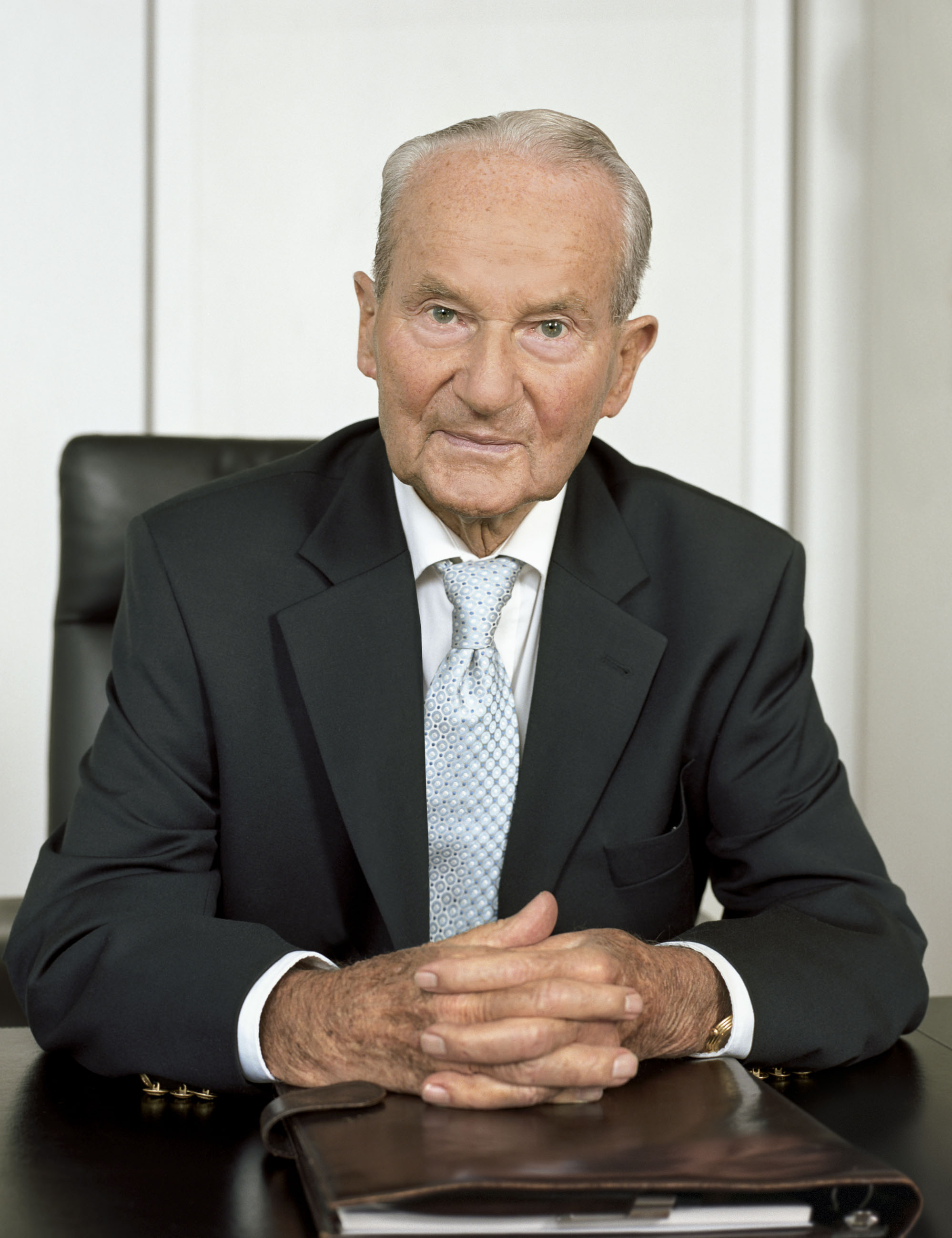
Reinhard Mohn (2008)

=== Establishment of the foundation ===
At the end of the 1970s, there were discussions concerning who would follow Reinhard Mohn as chairman of Bertelsmann. Against this background and because he believed that the state must be able to count on its citizens' willingness to assume responsibility and take the initiative, Mohn founded the Bertelsmann Stiftung on 8 February 1977. It was officially approved by the authorities on 14 March 1977. The Bertelsmann Stiftung was initially endowed with 100,000 Deutsche Marks in capital. About two years later, it began its work.

=== Building the foundation's work ===
In 1979, Hans-Dieter Weger was appointed the first managing director. He developed the concept of an operational foundation that develops and oversees its own projects. One of the Bertelsmann Stiftung's first activities was the baseline study Kommunikationsverhalten und Buch ("Communication Behavior and the Book"), which was prepared in cooperation with Infratest. The Bertelsmann Stiftung and the Bertelsmann Group also provided support for the construction of the Gütersloh municipal library.

In 1982, the Bertelsmann Stiftung presented its first public report of its activities. In the report's foreword, Karl Carstens, president of the Federal Republic of Germany, praised the "achievement of foundations in the public sphere." In the meantime, the Bertelsmann Stiftung had come to play a central role in Reinhard Mohn's sociopolitical activities. Mohn functioned as the foundation's sole executive and was supported by a newly created advisory board from 1983 onwards. In addition to Reinhard Mohn and Hans-Dieter Weger, the board's members were Kurt Biedenkopf, Gerd Bucerius, Friedhelm Farthmann and Eberhard Witte. In 1985, a publishing house was founded as part of the foundation in order to handle the growing number of publications. Verlag Bertelsmann Stiftung still exists today.

In 1988, the Bertelsmann Stiftung awarded the Carl Bertelsmann Prize (now known as the Reinhard Mohn Prize) for the first time. The recipients were employer organizations and trade unions in the construction, chemistry and metalworking industries. Today, the award continues to honor internationally renowned figures who have developed pioneering solutions to social and political challenges. In addition to working in Germany, the Bertelsmann Stiftung initiated several international projects in the 1980s, such as the Kulturraum Europa (European Culture Space). Further examples include a program at the Hebrew University of Jerusalem and the construction of the Biblioteca Can Torró in Alcúdia on the island of Majorca.

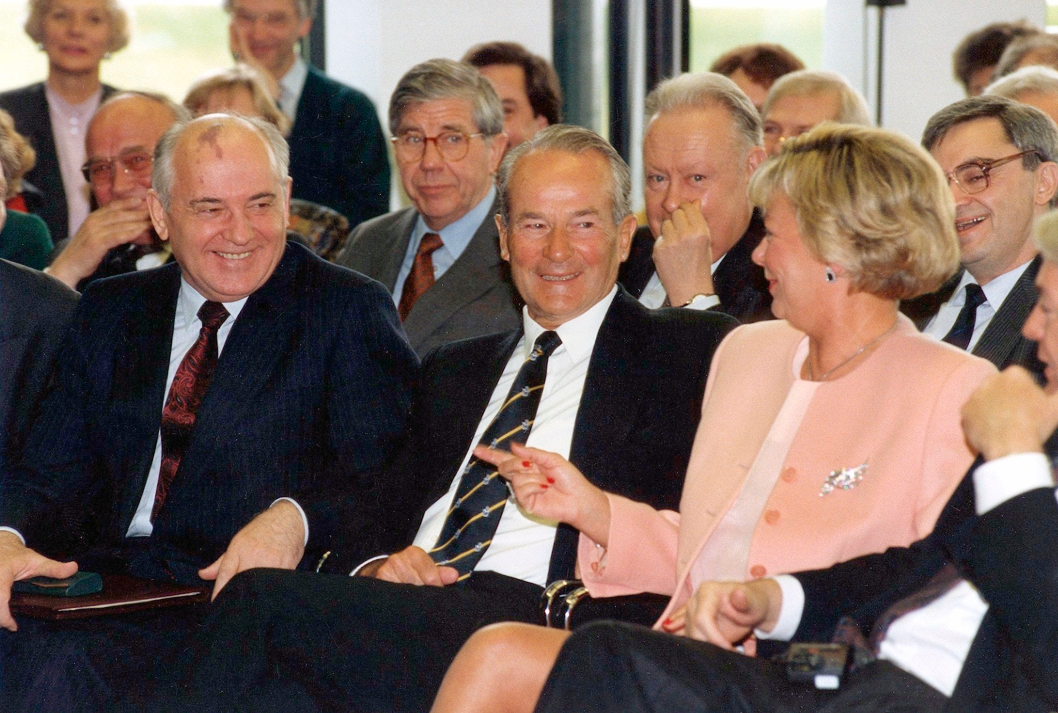
Mikhail Gorbachev, Reinhard Mohn and Liz Mohn in the foyer of the Bertelsmann Stiftung (1992)

Kurt Biedenkopf was elected as the first chairman of the advisory board in 1987, and Reinhard Mohn himself took over this position in 1990. Horst Teltschik then joined the foundation, a development that received a great deal of media attention. The former foreign policy adviser to Helmut Kohl became managing director of the Bertelsmann Stiftung in early 1991 and began focusing on the foundation's internationalization. At the end of the 1980s, the Bertelsmann Stiftung offices were built opposite the Bertelsmann corporate headquarters. Mikhail Gorbachev was a guest during his first trip to Germany after the demise of the Soviet Union.

=== Transferring the majority interest ===
In addition to Reinhard Mohn, Ulrich Saxer and Werner Weidenfeld were appointed to the Bertelsmann Stiftung executive board in 1993. New management was also hired. In the same year, Reinhard Mohn transferred the majority of the capital shares in the Bertelsmann Group to the foundation, a move intended to ensure continuity at the company. The transaction increased the foundation's stake in the company from 21.3% to 68.8%, being the largest shareholder. In the 1993 transfer agreement, however, shareholdings and voting rights were strictly separated, so that the foundation cannot exercise any significant influence on the Bertelsmann Group, which is still largely controlled by the Mohn family. As the foundation receives dividends for its holdings in the company, the transfer of shares resulted in a significant increase in the organization's budget.

=== Restructuring of governance boards ===
In 1998, Reinhard Mohn stepped down from his leading role at the Bertelsmann Stiftung. Mark Wössner was first elected chairman of the executive board, and, a year later, chairman of the advisory board. After Wössner's departure in 2000, the foundation's governance structure changed again: the executive board was replaced by an executive committee and the advisory board was replaced by a board of trustees. As an interim step, at the end of 2000 Reinhard Mohn became chairman of both the executive committee and the board of trustees, until Gunter Thielen succeeded him in both positions in mid-2001. With this step, Reinhard Mohn gave up all previous management functions, remaining only a member of the board of trustees.

Heribert Meffert succeeded Gunter Thielen in 2002 and continued to lead the Bertelsmann Stiftung until 2005. During his tenure, the executive committee became an executive board once again; the goal was to strengthen corporate governance by promoting greater transparency and independence. After Meffert left the foundation, it was jointly led by board chairs Liz Mohn and Johannes Meier. In 2008, Gunter Thielen returned to the Bertelsmann Stiftung as chairman of the executive board. Since 2012, the foundation has been led by Aart De Geus, former Dutch minister of labor and social affairs. Following his retirement at the end of 2019, Ralph Heck took over as chairman of the executive board in mid-2020.

== Organization ==
The Bertelsmann Stiftung is an independent foundation under private law, according to the laws governing foundations in the state of North Rhine-Westphalia. It is an unrestricted legal entity, which, internally and externally, must exclusively pursue the mission defined in its bylaws. The Bertelsmann Stiftung is overseen by the district government of Detmold and engages in tax-privileged activities exclusively and directly in accordance with the relevant tax regulations.

=== Boards ===
The Bertelsmann Stiftung's managerial and representative bodies report to the executive board, which, according to the foundation's bylaws, consists of at least three members who are appointed and removed by the board of trustees. The executive board develops the Bertelsmann Stiftung's organizational strategy, coordinates it with the board of trustees and oversees its implementation. Members of the executive board who are also members of the executive board of Bertelsmann Management SE can only represent the foundation in collaboration with a second board member who does not belong to the executive board of Bertelsmann Management SE, which is the Bertelsmann Group's management unit. At present, the Bertelsmann Stiftung executive board consists of Brigitte Mohn (chairperson), Daniela Schwarzer, and Wilhelm-Friedrich Uhr.

The executive board is advised and supervised by the Bertelsmann Stiftung board of trustees. This is involved in all decisions of fundamental importance. Its tasks also include approving the annual financial statements, overseeing the foundation's business management and formally accepting and approving the executive board's statement of activities. According to the bylaws, the board of trustees has at least six and a maximum of 14 members. These include the chairman or another member of the supervisory board of the Bertelsmann Group; a successor to Bertelsmann Stiftung founder Reinhard Mohn; Liz Mohn; and three to 11 other persons. The Bertelsmann Stiftung board of trustees currently includes Bodo Uebber (chairman), Liz Mohn (honorary member), Anna Maria Braun, Alena Buyx, Saori Dubourg, Arancha González Laya, Ralph Heck, Christoph Mohn, Andreas Pinkwart, and Matthias Schulz.

=== Funding ===
The Bertelsmann Stiftung is funded primarily by dividends from the Bertelsmann Group. The Bertelsmann Stiftung holds its shares in the Bertelsmann Group indirectly through Johannes Mohn GmbH, in which it holds a majority interest. The foundation's Bertelsmann Group shares are solely capital shares; voting rights are held by the Bertelsmann Verwaltungsgesellschaft mbH. Additional funding comes from partnerships with other non-profit organizations, income from the foundation's assets and donations. The Bertelsmann Stiftung sets aside reserves as required by the relevant tax regulations in order to pursue its activities independently of current income.

Since its establishment, the Bertelsmann Stiftung has invested a total of €1.9 billion in charitable work. In fiscal 2023, it received funds of around 163 million euros. Expenditures amounted to 75.6 million euros. The majority (€38.7 million) was spent on programs and special projects; €9.4 million were spent on administrative activities, €5.4 million on communication and €4.5 million on project-related services. In addition, the Bertelsmann Stiftung made grants to affiliated non-profit organizations in the amount of €17.6 million.

=== Locations ===
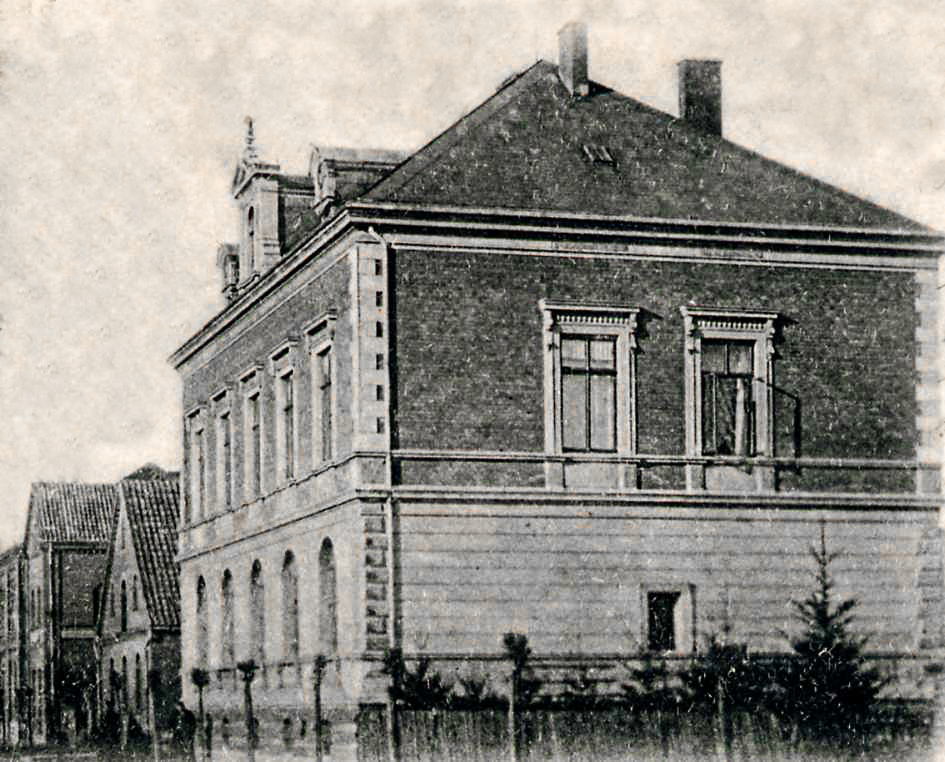
Reichsbank branch in Gütersloh (historical postcard motif)

The first offices of the Bertelsmann Stiftung were located in a residential building on Gütersloh's Carl-Miele-Straße. In 1980, offices were rented from the Bertelsmann Group instead. In 1986, the Bertelsmann Stiftung moved to a historic building on Moltkestraße, which had been erected by a subsidiary of the Reichsbank in 1893 and was owned by the central bank of the state of North Rhine-Westphalia until 1985. In 1989, the architecture firm Gerkan, Marg and Partners won a competition to design the new headquarters of the Bertelsmann Stiftung opposite the headquarters of the Bertelsmann Group. The building was completed in 1990 and expanded several times over the following years. In addition to the head office in Gütersloh, the Bertelsmann Group has an office in the Kommandantenhaus in Berlin, which has been used by the Bertelsmann Stiftung, too. It now has its own branch office on Werderschen Markt in the immediate vicinity of the Federal Foreign Office and the Humboldt Forum. Furthermore, the Bertelsmann Stiftung has an office in the European Quarter in Brussels.

In the mid-1990s, the Fundación Bertelsmann, an independent subsidiary foundation, was established in Barcelona, the capital of Catalonia. The aim was to promote reading and media literacy in Spain. Today, the Fundación Bertelsmann focuses on vocational training and career guidance for young people in Spain.

Since 2008, the Bertelsmann Stiftung has also been represented in US-capital Washington, D.C, by a second independent foundation, the Bertelsmann Foundation North America, which addresses challenges related to democracy, digitisation and transatlantic exchange through a variety of publications, documentaries and infographics.

== Activities ==
According to its bylaws, the purpose of the Bertelsmann Stiftung is to "promote science and research, religion, public health, youth and elderly welfare, art and culture, public and professional education, social welfare, an international perspective, democracy and social engagement." The Bertelsmann Stiftung is a private operating foundation and does not make grants. It invests funds in projects that it conceives, initiates and implements itself. For example, the Bertelsmann Stiftung produces studies and rankings, conducts model projects, shares knowledge and expertise, organizes congresses and awards prizes. Key fields are education, democracy, social affairs, health, the economy and culture. The Bertelsmann Stiftung does not engage in partisan politics. It works regionally, nationally and internationally.

=== Education ===
The Bertelsmann Stiftung examines at regular intervals how much the Germany's states are investing in early childhood education and care. One of its studies confirmed, for instance, that children's developmental opportunities depend heavily on their background. In the field of school education, the Bertelsmann Stiftung has been devoting itself in recent years to all-day schools in particular and has called for their expansion. Digital learning is also an important issue, as it is seen as a solution to various structural problems in the area of education. In addition, the Bertelsmann Stiftung has also been involved for years in vocational education and training.

In the 1990s, the Bertelsmann Stiftung's activities in the area of higher education received particularly widespread public attention, for example the establishment of the Centre for Higher Education (CHE) in 1994 by the Bertelsmann Stiftung and the German Rectors' Conference. This institution sees itself as a "workshop" for developing reforms for Germany's higher education institutions. The Bertelsmann Stiftung holds 90% of the shares in CHE Gemeinnütziges Centrum für Hochschulentwicklung GmbH.

=== Democracy ===
The Bertelsmann Stiftung claims commitment on both the national and the international level to strengthening democracy through the promotion of citizen participation in political decision-making and planning processes. With regard to cooperation between Germany's federal government, state and local institutions, the Bertelsmann Stiftung has been calling for several years for a revision of the system used to redistribute income among the country's states. The focus of the foundation's work in the field of democracy, however, is Europe. For years, the Bertelsmann Stiftung has advocated accelerating the EU's decision-making processes and promoting European integration. Internationally, the Bertelsmann Stiftung is researching existing governance structures and developing proposals to change them. One example is the concept of a non-profit rating agency.

The Bertelsmann Stiftung also helped fund the Center for Applied Policy Research (CAP) in 2010. The center was founded by Werner Weidenfeld, who was also a member of the Bertelsmann Stiftung executive board until 2007. Both institutions cooperated on a number of issues, including European integration. The center is affiliated with the Geschwister Scholl Institute of Political Science at LMU Munich.

=== Society ===
One major focus of the work done by the Bertelsmann Stiftung is demographic change in Germany, a subject on which it has published several studies. It also promotes volunteer work and other activities that increase social cohesion, in part by awarding of the "Mein gutes Beispiel" (My Best Practice) prize. Social justice and intergenerational equity are also important concerns, and one of the reasons the foundation addresses these subjects is to narrow the gap between rich and poor. The Bertelsmann Foundation wants to promote social integration and diversity. It advocates for creating a "comprehensive and long-term migration architecture" for Germany. Other projects address young people and families. For example, the Bertelsmann Stiftung is critical of the increase in child poverty in Germany and the way the country's pension system disadvantages families.

=== Health ===
The Bertelsmann Stiftung regularly analyzed health care in Germany for what it calls its "Gesundheitsmonitor" (Health-Care Monitor). Moreover, it has launched several projects in the last few years that promote informed decision-making among the public in the area of health care. The projects include the Internet portal "Weiße Liste" (White List) which helps users find the doctor, hospital, nursing home or nursing service that is right for them.

With the support of the Bertelsmann Stiftung, the Center for Hospital Management (CKM) was founded in 1994 as a research institute at the University of Münster. In addition to research on clinical IT and logistics, the center organizes training for the clinic's staff. The Bertelsmann Stiftung is no longer one of the shareholders of the CKM Centrum für Krankenhausmanagement GmbH. The institute has become a completely independent organization.

=== Culture ===
The Bertelsmann Stiftung's oldest project in the field of culture is the competition Neue Stimmen (New Voices) international singing competition, which was launched by Liz Mohn in 1987 and still takes place today. It is one of the world's most important competitions for up-and-coming opera singers and is known as a "showcase for new talent." The Bertelsmann Stiftung promotes an engagement with music in other ways as well. Model projects in this area have been carried out repeatedly since the end of the 1990s to achieve a number of objectives, including more and better music education in preschools. The goal is to increase social participation through singing and music.

=== Economy ===
The foundation has examined the impact of globalization on society is examined in terms of the opportunities and risks it presents. The Bertelsmann Stiftung advocates for developed countries to open their markets so that emerging economies can benefit more from economic developments. It has repeatedly published analyses and studies on changes in the German labor market, and the findings were partly incorporated into the Hartz reforms carried out during the Gerhard Schröder government. The Bertelsmann Stiftung is also committed to promoting sustainability and ensuring German businesses act in a socially responsible manner. In collaboration with the Hans Böckler Foundation, it carried out a study on employee participation in German companies.

== Criticism ==
The Bertelsmann Stiftung has been the subject of public debate. In 2007, Jens Wernicke and Torsten Bultmann published an anthology, entitled "Netzwerk der Macht – Bertelsmann" ("Network of Power – Bertelsmann"), which takes a critical look at the structure and activities of the Bertelsmann Stiftung. The book's 30 contributors focused in particular on the foundation's non-profit status and political influence. The anthology generated widespread public debate on the Bertelsmann Stiftung.

Published in 2010, the book "Bertelsmannrepublik Deutschland – eine Stiftung macht Politik" ("Bertelsmann's Republic of Germany: A Foundation Sets Policy") by author and journalist Thomas Schuler gained even greater attention. In it, Schuler describes how the Bertelsmann Stiftung seeks to make contact with leading politicians and to advise them. He criticized the Bertelsmann Stiftung as being "undemocratic" and lacking in transparency. In his opinion, the originally good idea behind the foundation developed into a "distorted world," the basic organization of which he called into question. Schuler also criticized German foundation law, which allows foundations such as the Bertelsmann Stiftung to exist at all. Peter Rawert, an expert on foundations, noted that the Bertelsmann Stiftung is guaranteed a return on its holdings in the Bertelsmann Group that is probably lower than what could be achieved with a fixed-income investment. He also noted that in the United States this would have a negative impact on the foundation's non-profit tax status; moreover, he argued that the situation does not reflect the "standard of efficiency" normally endorsed by the Bertelsmann Stiftung.

=== Commercial interests ===
Due to its majority interest in the Bertelsmann Group, the Bertelsmann Stiftung has been repeatedly accused of combining non-profit and commercial interests. In 2009, the journalist and author Annette Jensen asserted that the Bertelsmann Stiftung's proposals generate artificial demand, particularly in terms of the purported need to streamline local government, a demand which the foundation then meets, for example through the Bertelsmann subsidiary Arvato. She suggested that the RTL and VOX television stations belonging to the Bertelsmann Group and numerous Gruner + Jahr magazines served the foundation by disseminating its messages. The sociologist and entrepreneur Frank Adloff has argued that it is indefensible that the foundation does not need to justify the use of its funds before any parliament or oversight authority. In the United States, he noted, non-profit foundations are not permitted to hold more than a 20% stake in a company in order to avoid possible conflicts of interest; in addition, they have to provide a public accounting of their expenditures.

=== Political influence ===
Another criticism involves a lack of democratic legitimacy. Commenting on the foundation's "engagement with civil society," Wolfgang Lieb, former state secretary in the North Rhine-Westphalia Ministry of Science, has argued that this legitimacy is being increasingly diminished, and even replaced by, economic power. According to Lieb, private networks and behind-the-scenes advisors are thus turning into actual rulers. By consulting with politicians outside of government settings, Lieb suggests, the Bertelsmann Stiftung is pursuing a "privatization of politics," a situation that offers mutual benefits: civil servants and politicians are given a protected space where they alone are provided with information free of charge and where they can engage in discussion, while the Bertelsmann Stiftung secures access to all the projects it wants to influence. Thus, no matter who is elected, the Bertelsmann Stiftung is always part of the government. Speaking with broadcaster Deutschlandfunk in 2007, the former SPD politician and publicist Albrecht Müller called the foundation an "anti-democratic institution."

In 2008, the journalist and politician Julika Sandt criticized the growing influence of the Bertelsmann Stiftung on German health care, saying that initiatives developed by the foundation lead to preferential treatment for privatized clinics and medical care centers to the detriment of self-employed physicians. According to Sandt, because Brigitte Mohn was a member of both the Bertelsmann Stiftung executive board and the supervisory board of Rhön-Klinikum, the foundation's neutrality in the health sector is questionable.

In 2012, Josef Kraus, president of the German Teachers' Association, spoke critically about the influence of the Bertelsmann Stiftung on education policy. He described its studies as "unscientific" and as "scare tactics." Its activities almost always involved turning some alleged administrative failure into a scandal, Kraus said. He called on politicians to stop allowing themselves to be influenced by the Bertelsmann Stiftung and to take criticism of the foundation seriously.

The non-profit organization Lobbycontrol sees the Bertelsmann Stiftung as a business-oriented initiative, similar to the "Initiative Neue Soziale Marktwirtschaft" (Initiative for a New Social Market Economy) or the "Stiftung Marktwirtschaft" (Free Market Foundation). Lobbycontrol criticizes, for example, the "Standortcheck" (Business Location Check), which it says amounts to a canonical neoliberal reform.

The Bertelsmann Stiftung has repeatedly refuted criticism asserting a lack of democratic legitimacy and unpermitted political influence. For example, Gunter Thielen, former chairman and CEO of the Bertelsmann Stiftung, made it clear that the foundation was not a "secret government," that the formation of public opinion and policy is not a "top-down process," and that it was unimaginable that a foundation or a company could use its own ideas to influence or control a country like the Federal Republic of Germany.

=== Political neutrality ===
The Bertelsmann Stiftung describes itself as politically non-partisan. The practical implementation of this principle, however, has been questioned from several sides, in particular because the foundation has only established contacts with "radical supporters of market policies" among left-leaning parties. In turn, the Bertelsmann Stiftung has often been characterized as a proponent of economic liberalism, but this is also controversial; some critics have also labeled the Bertelsmann Stiftung neoliberal.

=== Non-profit status ===
In 2006, the author and journalist Harald Schumann discussed the non-profit status of the Bertelsmann Stiftung in the Tagesspiegel newspaper. According to Schumann, the "shadow government in Gütersloh" runs on de facto on public money, because Reinhard Mohn saved an over €2 billion in inheritance and gift taxes when he transferred three-quarters of the Bertelsmann Group capital shares to the foundation. Moreover, he asserts, the annual dividend payment to the foundation is tax-free and, with its annual budget of around €60 million, the foundation does not spend nearly as much as it costs the state in terms of lost revenue. Arno Klönne, a sociologist and political scientist, has argued that the Bertelsmann Stiftung's non-profit nature was questionable because, he maintains, it actively promotes the business of the Bertelsmann Group. Ultimately, he suggests, its goal is to manage society using corporate methods and to privatize the tasks that should be handled by the state.

In 2009, a group of independent legal experts found that the Bertelsmann Stiftung no longer met the requirements for a non-profit organization. On the contrary, they argued, the tax exemption was unjustly being used for the purpose of carrying out a transformation of society according to the beliefs of the Bertelsmann Stiftung's founder, Reinhard Mohn, by means of private, tax-financed private policy consulting and by bypassing democratic decision making processes through public discourse in Germany's constitutional bodies.

The Bertelsmann Stiftung has always rejected these accusations, noting that its non-profit status has been recognized by the tax authorities and is reviewed on an ongoing basis.

=== Social welfare cuts ===
In 2007, the trade union ver.di terminated its cooperation with the Bertelsmann Stiftung. The reason was that Arvato, a division of the Bertelsmann Group, declared the privatization of public services a strategic business area. A corresponding motion was passed at the union's federal congress against the wishes of its federal governing board. The Bertelsmann Stiftung is the driving force behind privatizations and cuts to social welfare programs, critics claimed. This assessment was supported by participants at "Das Schattenkabinett aus Gütersloh" ("The Shadow Cabinet from Gütersloh"), a conference critical of Bertelsmann. In addition to ver.di, other participants included Attac, GEW, IG Metall and the Otto Brenner Foundation. The Bertelsmann Stiftung rejected the criticism from ver.di in particular as a "misunderstanding," saying that both sides were not that far apart in their views on social problems.
