= List of German journalists =

This is a list of German journalists, those born in Germany and who have established citizenship or residency.

== A ==
- Aline Abboud (born 1988)
- Karl Aberle (1901-1963)
- Béla Anda (born 1963)
- Fatma Aydemir (born 1986)
- Cigdem Akyol (born 1978)
- Prince Albrecht of Croÿ (born 1959)
- Robin Alexander (born 1975)
- Hanns Altermann (1891–1963)
- Götz Aly (born 1947)
- Melanie Amann (born 1978)
- Ruth Andreas-Friedrich (1901–1977)
- Karl Andree (1808–1875)
- Reinhard Appel (1927–2011)
- Golineh Atai (born 1974)
- Pinar Atalay (born 1978)
- Jakob Augstein (born 1967)
- Rudolf Augstein (1923–2002)
- Stefan Aust (born 1946)

== B ==
- Andreas Bachmann (born 1974)
- Shakuntala Banerjee (born 1973)
- Günter Bannas (1952-2026)
- Marc Bator (born 1972)
- Gabi Bauer (born 1962)
- Gitta Bauer (1919–1990)
- Wolfgang Bauer (born 1970)
- Reinhold Beckmann (born 1956)
- Klaus Bednarz (1942–2015)
- Micky Beisenherz (born 1977)
- Bettina Belitz (born 1973)
- Inge Bell (born 1967)
- Thomas Bellut (born 1955)
- Klaus Bender (born 1938)
- Halina Bendkowski (born 1949)
- Katrin Bennhold (born 1974)
- Dagmar Berghoff (born 1943)
- Georg Bernhard (1875-1944)
- Anton Betz (1893–1984)
- Roberta Bieling (born 1975)
- Klaus von Bismarck (1912–1997)
- Monika Bittl (1963–2022)
- Nikolaus Blome (born 1963)
- Georg Blume (born 1963)
- Gero von Boehm (born 1954)
- Peter Boenisch (1927–2005)
- Erich Böhme (1930–2009)
- Alexander Bommes (born 1976)
- Andrea Böhm (born 1961)
- Jan Böhmermann (born 1981)
- Wibke von Bonin (born 1936)
- Bettina Böttinger (born 1956)
- Katharina Borchert (born 1972)
- Alice Bota (born 1979)
- Adolf Brand (1874–1945)
- Jo Brauner (born 1937)
- Nikolaus Brender (born 1949)
- Klaus Bresser (1936-2026)
- Mathias Bröckers (born 1954)
- Annika Brockschmidt (born 1992)
- Henryk Broder (born 1946)
- Erich Brost (1903–1995)
- Karl Brugger (1941-1984)
- Karl Heinrich Bruggerman (1810–1887)
- Christine von Brühl (born 1962)
- Wibke Bruhns (1938–2019)
- Tissy Bruns (1951–2013)
- Gerd Bucerius (1906–1995)
- Wolfgang Büchner (born 1966)
- Traude Bührmann (born 1942)
- Axel Bulthaupt (born 1966)
- Eleonore Büning (born 1952)
- Tom Buhrow (born 1958)
- Silke Burmester (born 1966)

== C ==
- Paul Carell (1911–1997)
- Claus Hinrich Casdorff (1924–2004)
- C. W. Ceram (1915–1972)
- Rudolph Chimelli (1928–2016)
- Sabine Christiansen (born 1957)
- Albrecht von Croÿ (born 1959)
- Harri Czepuck (1927–2015)

== D ==
- Kurt Dahlmann (1918–2017)
- Susanne Daubner (born 1961)
- Gerhard Delling (born 1959)
- Ulrich Deppendorf (born 1950)
- Barbara Dickmann (born 1942)
- Kai Diekmann (born 1964)
- Julia Dingwort-Nusseck (1921–2025)
- Hoimar von Ditfurth (1921–1989)
- Annette Dittert (born 1962)
- Marion Dönhoff (1909–2002)
- Mathias Döpfner (born 1963)
- Sammy Drechsel (1925–1986)
- Wolfgang Duncker (1909–1942)

== E ==
- Fritz Eberhard (1896–1982)
- Felix von Eckardt (1903-1973)
- Dietrich Eckart (1868–1923)
- Axel Eggebrecht (1899–1991)
- Ellen Ehni (born 1973)
- Marianne Ehrmann (1755–1795)
- Jürgen Elsässer (born 1957)
- Carolin Emcke (born 1967)
- Andreas Englisch (born 1963)
- Lothar Erdmann (1888–1939)
- Paul Ernst (1866–1933)
- Ingeborg Euler (1927–2005)

== F ==
- Emil Faktor (1876–1942)
- Thomas Fasbender (born 1957)
- Heribert Faßbender (born 1941)
- Gerhard Fauth (1915–2003)
- Felix Fechenbach (1894–1933)
- Markus Feldenkirchen (born 1975)
- Joachim Fest (1926–2006)
- Ullrich Fichtner (born 1965)
- Angela Finger-Erben (born 1980)
- Karl-Hermann Flach (1929–1973)
- Anna Fleischhauer (born 1987)
- Jan Fleischhauer (born 1962)
- Matthias Fornoff (born 1963)
- Georg Forster (1754–1794)
- Richard von Frankenberg (1922–1973)
- Peter Frey (born 1957)
- Frederic Friedel (born 1945)
- Michel Friedman (born 1956)
- Hanns-Joachim Friedrichs (1927–1995)
- Matthias Frings (born 1954)
- Maria Frisé (1926–2022)
- Alexandra Fröhlich (1967–2025)
- Bella Fromm (1890-1972)
- Walther Funk (1890–1960)
- Daniel Funke (born 1981)

== G ==
- Hannelore Gadatsch (1941–2024)
- Hugo Ganz (1862–1922)
- Susanne Gaschke (born 1967)
- Bettina Gaus (1956–2021)
- Günter Gaus (1929–2004)
- Anne Gellinek (born 1962)
- Annette Gerlach (born 1964)
- Daniel Gerlach (born 1977)
- Hellmut von Gerlach (1866–1935)
- Fritz Gerlich (1883–1934)
- Petra Gerster (born 1955)
- Otto Gildemeister (1823–1902)
- Thomas Gnielka (1928–1965)
- Leopold Friedrich Günther von Goeckingk (1748–1828)
- Alexander Görlach (born 1976)
- Hermann L. Gremliza (1940–2019)
- Ulrike von der Groeben (born 1957)
- Kurt Großmann (1897–1972)
- Detlef Grumbach (born 1955)
- Karl Theodor Ferdinand Grün (1817–1887)
- Wolfgang Gust (1935-2026)

== H ==
- Lutz Hachmeister (1959–2024)
- Barbara Hahlweg (born 1968)
- Brigitte Hamann (1940–2016)
- Wilhelm Joachim von Hammerstein (1838-1904)
- Volker Handloik (1961–2001)
- Johannes Hano (born 1963)
- Dörte Hansen (born 1964)
- Maximilian Harden (1861–1927)
- Sylvia von Harden (1894–1963)
- Norbert Häring (born 1963)
- Waldemar Hartmann (born 1948)
- Hadija Haruna-Oelker (born 1980)
- Wolfgang Harich (1923-1995)
- Tina Hassel (born 1964)
- Alice Hasters (born 1989)
- Theodor Haubach (1896–1945)
- Norbert Haug (born 1952)
- Gaby Hauptmann (born 1957)
- Bodo Hauser (1946–2004)
- Dunja Hayali (born 1974)
- Wolf Heckmann (1929–2006)
- Gerd Heidemann (1931–2024)
- Marcus Hellwig (born 1965)
- Hanna Herbst (born 1990)
- Joachim Hermann (1928–1992)
- Kai Hermann (born 1938)
- Rudolf Herrnstadt (1903–1966)
- Rudolf Herrnstadt (1903–1966)
- Malte Herwig (born 1972)
- Felix Hirsch (1902–1982)
- Jan Hofer (born 1952)
- Werner Höfer (1913–1997)
- Britta Hofmann (born 1980)
- Max Hofmann (born 1974)
- Charlotte Hohmann (1900–1971)
- Valeska Homburg (born 1976)
- Raphael Honigstein (born 1973)
- Gabriele Hooffacker (born 1959)
- Mareile Höppner (born 1977)
- Marion Horn (born 1965)
- Ernst Huberty (1927–2023)
- Marie Hüllenkremer (1943–2004)

== I ==
- Maybrit Illner (born 1965)

== J ==
- Heinrich Eduard Jacob (1889–1967)
- Claus Jacobi (1927–2013)
- Siegfried Jacobsohn (1881–1926)
- Oliver Janich (born 1969)
- Günther Jauch (born 1956)
- Luc Jochimsen (born 1936)
- Josef Joffe (born 1944)

== K ==
- August von Kageneck (1922–2004)
- Anetta Kahane (born 1954)
- Hellmuth Karasek (1934–2015)
- Charlotte Karlinder (born 1975)
- Manuela Kasper-Claridge (born 1959)
- Jürgen Kaube (born 1962)
- Manuela Kay (born 1964)
- Ernst Keil (1816–1878)
- Sven Felix Kellerhoff (born 1971)
- Georgine Kellermann (born 1957)
- Johannes B. Kerner (born 1964)
- Walther Kiaulehn (1900-1968)
- Thomas Kielinger (born 1940)
- Ulrich Kienzle (1936–2020)
- Susanne Kippenberger (born 1957)
- Hans Hellmut Kirst (1914–1989)
- Claus Kleber (born 1955)
- Peter Kloeppel (born 1958)
- Steffen Klusmann (born 1966)
- Carsten Knop (born 1969)
- Tanit Koch (born 1977)
- Norbert König (born 1958)
- Berthold Kohler (born 1961)
- Karl-Heinz Köpcke (1922–1991)
- Theo Koll (born 1958)
- Siegfried Kracauer (1889–1966)
- Elmar Kraushaar (born 1950)
- Walter Kreiser (1898–1958)
- Daniel Kretschmar (born 1976)
- Gabriele Krone-Schmalz (born 1949)
- Dieter Kronzucker (born 1936)
- Norbert Kuchinke (1940-2013)
- Ludger Kühnhardt (born 1958)
- Rudibert Kunz (born 1943)
- Dieter Kürten (born 1935)
- Dirk Kurbjuweit (born 1962)
- Şeyda Kurt (born 1992)

== L ==
- Andreas Landwehr (born 1959)
- Hans-Dieter Lange (1926–2012)
- Christoph Lanz (born 1959)
- Markus Lanz (born 1969)
- Walther von La Roche (1936–2010)
- Renate Lasker-Harpprecht (1924–2021)
- Franca Lehfeldt (born 1989)
- Juliane Leopold (born 1983)
- Martin Lejeune (born 1980)
- Gabriele Lesser (born 1960)
- Hans Leyendecker (born 1949)
- Christian Lindner (born 1959)
- Susan Link (born 1979)
- Monica Lierhaus (born 1970)
- Peter Limbourg (born 1960)
- Sascha Lobo (born 1975)
- Günther von Lojewski (1935–2023)
- Wolf von Lojewski (born 1937)
- Giovanni di Lorenzo (born 1959)
- Gerhard Löwenthal (1922–2002)
- Richard Löwenthal (1908–1991)
- Michael Lüders (born 1959)
- Ernst-Dieter Lueg (1930–2000)
- Bettina Lüscher (born 1961)

== M ==
- Hanns Maaßen (1908-1983)
- Sandra Maischberger (born 1966)
- Helmut Markwort (born 1936)
- Christoph von Marschall (born 1959)
- Harald Martenstein (born 1953)
- Hede Massing (1900–1981)
- Miriam Meckel (born 1967)
- Ulrike Meinhof (1934–1976)
- Hans Meiser (1946–2023)
- Souad Mekhennet (born 1979)
- Wolfgang Menge (1924–2012)
- Peter Merseburger (1928–2022)
- Hubertus Meyer-Burckhardt (born 1956)
- Bascha Mika (born 1954)
- Sonia Seymour Mikich (born 1951)
- Caren Miosga (born 1969)
- Erik Möller (born 1979)
- Rudolf Mosse (1843–1920)
- Elisabeth Motschmann (born 1952)
- Erich Mühsam (1878–1934)
- Ann-Katrin Müller (born 1987)
- Katrin Müller-Hohenstein (born 1965)
- Julitta Münch (1959–2020)

== N ==
- Peretz Naftali (1888–1961)
- Henri Nannen (1913–1996)
- Michael Naumann (born 1941)
- Rupert Neudeck (1939–2016)
- Natias Neutert (born 1941)
- Maren Niemeyer (born 1964)
- Friedrich Nowottny (born 1929)

== O ==
- Frederik Obermaier (born 1984)
- Bastian Obermayer (born 1977)
- Oda Olberg (1872–1955)
- Rudolf Olden (1885–1940)
- Matthias Opdenhövel (born 1970)
- Carl von Ossietzky (1889–1938)

== P ==
- Gaby Papenburg (born 1960)
- Jana Pareigis (born 1981)
- Jean Peters (born 1984)
- Ludwig Pfau (1821–1894)
- Monika Piel (born 1951)
- Frank Plasberg (born 1957)
- Frederik Pleitgen (born 1976)
- Fritz Pleitgen (1938–2022)
- Ines Pohl (born 1967)
- Dirk Pohlmann (born 1959)
- Alan Posener (born 1949)
- Ulrich Potofski (1952-2025)
- Heribert Prantl (born 1953)

== R ==
- Fritz J. Raddatz (1931–2015)
- Iris Radisch (born 1959)
- Judith Rakers (born 1976)
- Ashwin Raman (born 1946)
- Julian Reichelt (born 1981)
- Johann Georg Reißmüller (1932–2018)
- Anja Reschke (born 1972)
- Petra Reski (born 1958)
- Georg Restle (born 1965)
- Sir John Retcliffe (1815–1878)
- Béla Réthy (born 1956)
- Felix Rexhausen (1932–1992)
- Claus Richter (born 1948)
- Wilhelm Heinrich Riehl (1823–1897)
- Bettina Röhl (born 1962)
- Sabine Rollberg (born 1953)
- Paul Ronzheimer (born 1985)
- Marcel Rosenbach (born 1972)
- Dagmar Rosenfeld (born 1974)
- Lea Rosh (born 1936)
- Jürgen Roth (1945–2017)
- Thomas Roth (born 1951)
- Gerd Rubenbauer (born 1948)
- Anna Rüling (1880–1953)
- Gerd Ruge (1928–2021)
- Nina Ruge (born 1956)

== S ==
- Christiane Sadlo (born 1954)
- Dirk Sager (1940–2014)
- Thomas Satinsky (born 1963)
- Anna Sauerbrey (born 1979)
- Horst von Saurma (born 1954)
- Rüdiger Schaper (born 1959)
- Julia Scharf (born 1981)
- Bettina Schausten (born 1965)
- Denis Scheck (born 1964)
- Fritz Schenk (1930–2006)
- Ute Scheub (born 1955)
- Christian Scheuß (born 1966)
- Frank Schirrmacher (1959–2014)
- Patricia Schlesinger (born 1961)
- Lissy Schmidt (1959–1994)
- Rolf Schmidt-Holtz (born 1948)
- Elke Schmitter (born 1961)
- Gregor Peter Schmitz (born 1975)
- Wolf Schneider (1925–2022)
- Cordt Schnibben (born 1952)
- Karl-Eduard von Schnitzler (1918–2001)
- Peter Scholl-Latour (1924–2014)
- Alexander, Count of Schönburg-Glauchau (born 1969)
- Joachim, Count of Schönburg-Glauchau (1929–1998)
- Renate Schostack (1938–2016)
- Bernhard Schottländer (1895–1920)
- Claudia Schreiber (born 1958)
- Constantin Schreiber (born 1979)
- Jürgen Schreiber (1947–2022)
- Doris Schröder-Köpf (born 1963)
- Levin Schücking (1814-1883)
- Alice Schwarzer (born 1942)
- Egon Scotland (1948–1991)
- Rolf Seelmann-Eggebert (1937-2025)
- Steffen Seibert (born 1960)
- Hajo Seppelt (born 1963)
- Klaus-Peter Siegloch (born 1946)
- Hans Siemsen (1891–1969)
- Christian Sievers (born 1969)
- Eva Siewert (1907–1994)
- Ferdinand Simoneit (1925–2010)
- Marietta Slomka (born 1969)
- Theo Sommer (1930–2022)
- Richard Sorge (1895–1944)
- Augustin Souchy (1892–1984)
- Ré Soupault (1901–1996)
- Axel Springer (1912–1985)
- Gabor Steingart (born 1962)
- Ronen Steinke (born 1983)
- Carola Stern (1925-2006)
- Susanne Stichler (born 1961)
- Wolfgang Stock (born 1959)
- Ilse Stöbe (1911–1942)
- Claus Strunz (born 1966)
- Benjamin von Stuckrad-Barre (born 1977)

== T ==
- Peter Tamm (1928–2016)
- Hartmann von der Tann (born 1943)
- Hermann-Josef Tenhagen (born 1963)
- Gabriele Tergit (1894–1982)
- Elmar Theveßen (born 1967)
- Jana Thiel (1971–2016)
- Wim Thoelke (1927–1995)
- Carmen Thomas (born 1946)
- Roland Tichy (born 1955)
- Carlo von Tiedemann (1943–2025)
- Hans-Martin Tillack (born 1961)
- Gudrun Trausmuth (born 1969)
- Paul Tröger (1913-1992)
- Thaddäus Troll (1914–1980)
- Kurt Tucholsky (1890–1935)
- Richard Tüngel (1893–1970)

== U ==
- Wilhelm Ulbrich (1846–1922)
- Udo Ulfkotte (1960–2017)
- Leopold Ullstein (1826–1899)
- Klaus Umbach (1936–2018)
- Thomas Urban (born 1954)

== V ==
- Harry Valérien (1923-2012)
- Larissa Vassilian (born 1976)
- Werner Veigel (1928–1995)
- Carl Freiherr von Vogelsang (1900–1977)

== W ==
- Silvia Wadhwa (born 1959)
- Hermann Wagener (1815-1889)
- Franz Josef Wagner (1943-2025)
- Günter Wallraff (born 1942)
- Rüdiger von Wechmar (1923–2007)
- Volker Weidermann (born 1969)
- Wolfram Weimer (born 1964)
- Maria von Welser (born 1946)
- Martha Wertheimer (1890–1942)
- Fanny Fee Werther (born 1994)
- Christine Westermann (born 1948)
- Ulrich Wickert (born 1942)
- Wilhelm Wieben (1935–2019)
- Charlotte Wiedemann (born 1954)
- Deba Wieland (1916–1992)
- Ulrich Wilhelm (born 1961)
- Anne Will (born 1966)
- Katharina Willinger (born 1986)
- Georg Wolff (1914–1996)
- Theodor Wolff (1868–1943)
- Ulla Wolff (1850–1924)
- Jörg Wontorra (born 1948)
- Olaf von Wrangel (1928–2009)

== X ==
- You Xie (born 1958)

== Y ==
- Hengameh Yaghoobifarah (born 1991)
- Deniz Yücel (born 1973)

== Z ==
- Peter von Zahn (1913–2001)
- Ingo Zamperoni (born 1974)
- Hans Zehrer (1899–1966)
- Sonja Zekri (born 1967)
- Linda Zervakis (born 1975)
- Annika Zimmermann (born 1989)
- Brigitte Zimmermann (born 1939)
- Eduard Zimmermann (1929–2009)
- Ferdinand Zimmermann (1898–1967)
- Sabine Zimmermann (1951–2020)
- Heinz Zöger (1915-2000)

== See also ==
- Category:German journalists
- List of Germans
- List of German-language authors
- List of German-language philosophers
- List of German-language playwrights
- List of German-language poets
