= Magdalena Hofdemel =

Czech pianist, violinist and student of Wolfgang Amadeus Mozart

Maria Magdalena Hofdemel née Pokorný (born 1766 in Brno) was a Czech pianist, violinist, and student of Wolfgang Amadeus Mozart. She is primarily known for a speculative theory that she was connected to Mozart's death.

== Life ==
Magdalena was the daughter of Gotthard Pokorný (1733–1802), who became Kapellmeister at the Cathedral of St. Peter and Paul in Brno in 1760 and gave his daughter a musical education, which included playing duets with her. Bohumír Jan Dlabač heard her play in September 1788 and reports that she was a "virtuoso violinist." She married the Austrian jurist Franz Hofdemel (ca. 1755–1791), who worked in the Austrian Chancellery and moved to Vienna with him. They had a daughter, Theresa, who was born in 1790.

Soon after her daughter's birth, Hofdemel became a piano student of Mozart. Franz Hofdemel was a Freemason, like Mozart, and had loaned him money. Mozart was believed to have been romantically involved with many of his female students and some contemporaries, including Ludwig van Beethoven, believed that this included Magdalena Hofdemel. This belief may have been exacerbated when Magdalena Hofdemel became pregnant in 1791. Mozart died unexpectedly on 5 December 1791 from "severe miliary fever," that is a fever characterised by severe sweating and millet-sized bumps on the skin. On 10 December, Franz Hofdemel assaulted his wife, who was found the next morning, unconscious in a pool of blood, with razor-wounds on her neck and arms. Franz then committed suicide in an adjoining room. The event was the subject of a month-long scandal in the Austrian press.

A rumour circulated in Vienna in the nineteenth and twentieth centuries that Franz Hofdemel had attacked Mozart, resulting in a cerebral haemorrhage which caused his death. The idea appeared in a novel of 1841 and stage play of 1874. Francis Carr revived this theory in a 1985 book, proposing that Franz Hofdemel had poisoned Mozart out of jealousy, that Mozart had confided in his own wife Constanze Mozart that he feared for his life, and that Mozart's hasty funeral was meant to avoid an autopsy which might have revealed the murder. Piero Melograni dismisses this theory as "not... persuasive" and it is not accepted by mainstream scholarship.

The widowed Magdalena Hofdemel received a state payment in March 1792 and returned to her hometown of Brno, where her son Johann Alexander Franz Hofdemel was born on 10 May. Because of the disfigurement from her husband's assault and the continued press interest in her connection to Mozart, she stopped performing music publicly. The parents of Carl Czerny arranged for her to hear the young Ludwig van Beethoven play during a visit to Vienna and she reported that "his skills were indeed superior to Mozart's." Nothing is known of her later life or her date of death.

== Bibliography ==
- Carr, Francis (1985). Mozart & Constanze. New York: Avon. ISBN 9780380698844.
- Gärtner, Heinz (2004). Adieu, Mozart : die Hofdemel-Tragödie und die Selbstzerstörung eines Genies. Frankfurt/Main: R.G. Fischer. ISBN 3830107080.
- Hoffmann, Freia (2006). "Hofdemel, Magdalena". Europäische Instrumentalistinnen des 18. und 19. Jahrhunderts. Sophie Drinker Institut.
- Melograni, Piero (2007). Wolfgang Amadeus Mozart : a biography. Chicago: University of Chicago Press. ISBN 9780226519562.
- Umbach, Klaus (16 December 1984). "Amadeus in der Giftküche". Der Spiegel (in German).
