= To Tell the Truth =

American television game show

- Logo for To Tell the Truth (2016 version)
- Genre: Panel show
- Created by: Bob Stewart
- Presented by: Mike Wallace (unaired pilot only); Bud Collyer; Garry Moore; Bill Cullen; Joe Garagiola; Robin Ward; Gordon Elliott; Lynn Swann; Alex Trebek; John O'Hurley; Anthony Anderson
- Announcer: Bern Bennett; Johnny Olson; Bill Wendell; Alan Kalter; Burton Richardson; David Scott; Anthony Anderson
- Music by: Score Productions; Gary Stockdale
- Country of origin: United States
- Original language: English
- No. of seasons: 12 (1956–68); 9 (1969–78); 1 (1980–81); 1 (1990–91); 2 (2000–02); 6 (2016–22)
- No. of episodes: 473 (CBS Primetime; 1956-67); 1,625 (CBS Daytime; 1962–68); 1,715 (Syndicated; 1969–78); 195 (Syndicated; 1980–81); 190 (NBC Daytime; 1990–91); 271 (Syndicated; 2000–02); 86 (ABC; 2016–22)

Production
- Running time: 22–26 minutes (1956–2002); 42–46 minutes (2016–22)
- Production companies: Goodson-Todman Productions (1956–81); Mark Goodson Productions (1990–2002); Pearson Television (2000–02); Gaspin Media (2016–22); A2 Productions (2016–22); Fremantle North America (2016–22)

Original release
- Network: CBS
- Release: December 18, 1956 – September 6, 1968
- Network: Syndication (First edition)
- Release: September 8, 1969 – September 7, 1978
- Network: Syndication (Second edition)
- Release: September 8, 1980 – June 12, 1981
- Network: NBC
- Release: September 3, 1990 – May 31, 1991
- Network: Syndication (Third edition)
- Release: September 18, 2000 – January 28, 2002
- Network: ABC
- Release: June 14, 2016 – April 26, 2022

To Tell the Truth is an American television panel show. Four celebrity panelists are presented with three contestants, all claiming to be the subject of a story read aloud by the host. The panel then asks questions of the three contestants in an attempt to determine which is the subject.

The show was created by Bob Stewart and originally produced by Mark Goodson–Bill Todman Productions. It first aired on CBS from 1956 to 1968 with Bud Collyer as host. From 1969 to 1978, the show was revived in syndication, with Garry Moore as the first host. Former panelist and frequent guest host Joe Garagiola took over in 1977, following Moore's health issues. Garagiola hosted until the show's cancellation.

Robin Ward hosted a 1980–81 syndicated revival of the program, and a 1990–91 revival on NBC featured a succession of different hosts: Gordon Elliott, Lynn Swann and Alex Trebek. The show was revived again in syndication from 2000 to 2002 with John O'Hurley as host. The most recent version aired on ABC from 2016 to 2022 with Anthony Anderson as host.

== Gameplay ==
Three contestants are presented, all claiming to be the primary subject or "central character" of a human-interest story. Two are impostors, and one is the true subject of the story. The announcer typically introduces all three contestants by asking them, "What is your name, please?", after which all three in turn give the name of the story's subject. After the host and four celebrity guests are introduced, the host reads aloud an affidavit about the subject. The panelists are each given a period of time to ask questions of the three contestants. Questions are directed to the challengers by number (numbers one, two, and three from the viewer's left to right), with the central character sworn to give truthful answers, and the impostors permitted to lie and pretend to be the central character.

After questioning is complete, each member of the panel votes on which of the challengers he or she believes to be the central character, typically by holding up a card with the number of the contestant whom they believe is the true subject. Any panelist who knows one of the challengers or has another unfair advantage is required to disqualify themselves from both questioning and voting.

Once the votes are counted, the host asks, "Will the real [person's name] please stand up?" The central character then stands, often after some brief playful feinting and false starts among all three challengers. Occasionally, the central character may be asked to do something else related to his or her story. The two impostors then reveal their real names and their actual occupations. Prize money is awarded and divided among all three of the challengers, based on the number of incorrect votes received by the impostors.

== History ==
=== 1956–1968, CBS ===
To Tell the Truth was to have premiered on Tuesday, December 18, 1956, on CBS in primetime as Nothing But The Truth, but the program title was changed to To Tell the Truth the day before the show's debut. The 1956 pilot episode, entitled "Nothing But The Truth," was hosted by Mike Wallace. The panelists were Dick Van Dyke, John Cameron Swayze, Polly Bergen and Hildy Parks and can be viewed on YouTube. Both the planned and eventual titles derive from the standard English court oath "to tell the truth, the whole truth, and nothing but the truth."

The series was recorded in New York City, initially at CBS Studio 62 (the Biltmore Theater), then CBS Studio 59 (the Mansfield Theatre), then CBS Studio 52 (the future Studio 54), and eventually the Ed Sullivan Theater late in its run. The move to CBS Studio 52 in June 1960 resulted in the positions of the panel and challengers switched from being on the host's left and right respectively, to right and left respectively. The existence of an audience ticket for a taping indicates that the show originated in color at the CBS Broadcast Center in late 1966.

Bud Collyer was the show's host (Mike Wallace hosted the pilot); recurring panelists by the 1960s included Tom Poston, Peggy Cass, Orson Bean, and Kitty Carlisle. (Cass and Carlisle stayed on as panelists for most subsequent editions.) Earlier regular panelists included Johnny Carson, Polly Bergen, Jayne Meadows, Don Ameche, Hy Gardner, Dick Van Dyke, Faye Emerson, Hildy Parks, John Cameron Swayze, Betty White, and Ralph Bellamy. Bern Bennett, Collyer's announcer on Beat the Clock, was the inaugural announcer of To Tell the Truth in the 1950s. Upon Bennett's transfer to CBS's Los Angeles studios, Johnny Olson, who in time became the best-known of all Goodson–Todman Productions announcers, joined the show in 1960 and remained with the show until 1972.

On the pilot and the primetime run, three games were played per episode. For the pilot, a wrong vote from each of the four-member panel and one wrong vote derived from the majority vote of the audience (a total of five votes) paid $300, the total prize money divided among the three challengers. The studio audience also voted, with the majority vote counting equally with that of one by a celebrity panelist; thus, the maximum of five incorrect votes resulted in $1,500 divided among the challengers. If there was a tie for the highest vote from the audience, and for each panelist who was disqualified, a wrong vote was counted. There was no consolation prize for no wrong votes.

For the majority of the primetime run there was no audience vote, thus each wrong vote from the four-member panel paid $250, divided among the three challengers, for a possible $1,000 for a complete stump of four wrong answers. A consolation prize of $150 was awarded and divided among the three challengers if there were no wrong votes. For each panelist who was disqualified, a wrong vote was counted. A design element in the set for this series was a platform situated directly above and behind the emcee's desk. The contestants stood on this platform during their introduction, allowing the camera to pan directly down to the host. They then traveled down a curved staircase to the main stage level to play the game. Some subsequent versions would use a variation of the original set design; others did not and had all the action at floor level.

On Monday, June 18, 1962, a daytime five-day-per-week edition was introduced, running at 3 p.m. Eastern Time. The daytime show, also hosted by Collyer, featured a separate panel for its first three years, with actress Phyllis Newman as the only regular. The evening panel took over the afternoon show in 1965; in early 1968, Bert Convy replaced Poston in the first chair.

The daytime show was reduced to two games to accommodate a five-minute CBS news bulletin towards the half-hour mark. On the CBS daytime run, each wrong vote paid the three challengers $100 for a possible total of $400 divided among the three challengers for a "complete stump" of all four wrong votes. If all the votes were correct, the challengers split a consolation prize of $75. During the show's final year and a half, the studio audience also voted, with the majority vote counting equally with that of one of the celebrity panelists, thus a maximum of $500 divided among the challengers could be awarded for the maximum five incorrect votes. If there was a tie for the highest vote from the audience, and for each panelist who was disqualified, a wrong vote was counted. The audience vote was utilized on the nighttime show for its final six episodes (increasing the maximum possible payout to $1,250).

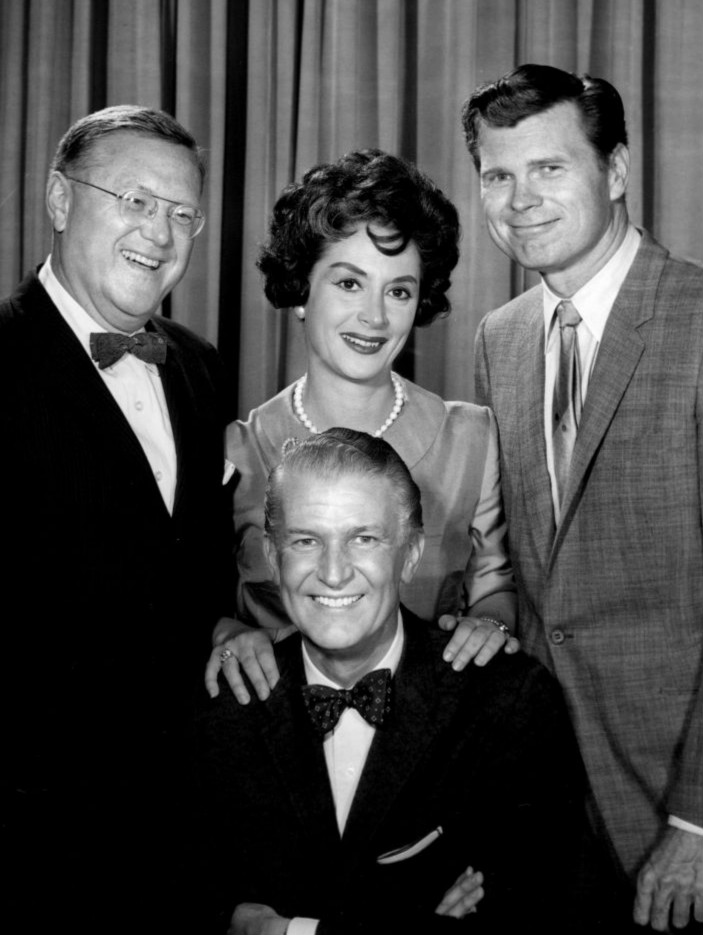
The original daytime panel with Bud Collyer. From left: Sam Levenson, Mimi Benzell, and Barry Nelson. The fourth panel member was Sally Ann Howes.

One CBS daytime episode featuring Dorothy Kilgallen, best known as a regular panelist on What's My Line?, was broadcast in the Eastern, Central, and Mountain time zones on Monday, November 8, 1965, as news of her sudden death was circulated by wire services. The breaking news story prompted CBS newscaster Douglas Edwards to announce her death immediately after the episode ended. She had videotaped the program six days earlier, according to the New York Herald Tribune. The newspaper added that Kilgallen and Arlene Francis both pretended to be Joan Crawford while sitting next to the real Crawford in a celebrity segment that the daytime series featured regularly starting in 1965. The episode was one of the large majority of To Tell the Truth daytime episodes that were destroyed because of the common practice of wiping videotape for reuse, prior to the development of less expensive technology. This was a different half-hour telecast from the 1962 primetime episode on which Kilgallen can be seen and heard as one of the panelists. Game Show Network repeated that episode decades later.

The primetime show ended on May 22, 1967, with the daytime show ending on September 6, 1968. The latter was replaced by the expansions of Search for Tomorrow and The Guiding Light, the last two remaining 15-minute programs on daytime television, to 30 minutes apiece, in a scheduling shuffle with The Edge of Night, The Secret Storm, and Art Linkletter's House Party. Like the primetime version, the daytime show's popularity underwent a steady decline toward the end of its run, as it faced two daytime dramas on ABC and NBC, General Hospital and Another World, respectively.

Metropole Orchestra leader Dolf van der Linden composed the show's first theme, "Peter Pan", used from 1956 to 1961. From 1961 to 1967, the show switched to a Bob Cobert-penned theme with a beat similar to "Peter Pan", and then to a Score Productions tune during its final CBS daytime season.

Most episodes of the original nighttime run of the series were preserved on black-and-white kinescope, along with a few color videotape episodes. Only a handful of shows remain from the CBS daytime series' first three years because of the then-common practice of wiping videotapes and reusing them due to their high cost and limited storage space. Many daytime episodes (including some in color) from 1966 to 1968 exist, including the color finale.

Reruns of the black-and-white kinescopes have been shown on Buzzr and Game Show Network.

=== 1969–1978, syndication ===
To Tell the Truth returned only a year later, in autumn of 1969, in first-run syndication. During the early years of its run, the syndicated Truth became a highly-rated component of stations' early-evening schedules after the Federal Communications Commission imposed the Prime Time Access Rule in 1971, opening up at least a half hour (a full hour, usually, on Eastern Time Zone stations) to fill with non-network fare between either the local or network evening newscast and the start of their networks' primetime schedules for the evening. Other stations found success running the program in place of a daytime network game or soap opera, or in the afternoon fringe time period between the end of network daytime programming at 4:30/3:30 Central and the evening newscasts.

Like the network editions that preceded it, the syndicated To Tell the Truth taped its episodes in New York for its entire run. Initially occupying the same studio space at the Ed Sullivan Theater that it had for the last few years of the network series, the show would eventually move operations to NBC's studios at 30 Rockefeller Plaza in April 1971.

Each wrong vote in this version was worth $50 to the challengers; complete stumps of the entire panel won the challengers a total of $500. There were two games per episode, and there was often a live demonstration or video clip to illustrate the central character's story after many of the games.

The show was first released to local stations on September 8, 1969. A total of 1,715 episodes of this version were produced, with the series ending on September 7, 1978. Some markets that added the series after its initial 1969 release opted to carry the show for another season or two after 1978 in order to catch up on the episodes that had not aired in their viewing area.

To host the revival series, Goodson and Todman made a call to original host Bud Collyer; however, Collyer had been suffering from a series of health issues that led to his death on the day the 1969 series premiered, and he told them "I'm just not up to it." The next call they made was to Garry Moore, the former host of I've Got a Secret as well as the CBS variety series The Garry Moore Show. Moore had largely been away from television since his variety series was cancelled in 1964 (he left I've Got a Secret around the same time), but he decided the time was right to return and he accepted the offer to host the new series. Regular panelists throughout the show’s run included Peggy Cass, Kitty Carlisle and Bill Cullen, who was also the designated substitute host whenever necessary. Orson Bean was the fourth regular panelist through the ninth week of the program’s second season, after which he left the show and his position on the panel became known as “the rotating chair”. Seen most often as the fourth panelist following Bean’s departure was Gene Rayburn or Nipsey Russell. Other semi-regulars throughout the program’s run included Gene Shalit, Larry Blyden, and original series stalwart Tom Poston; Orson Bean would return as a semi-regular panelist in 1971.

In late 1976, during the eighth season, Moore was diagnosed with esophageal cancer and left for the remainder of the season to deal with his illness. As he had done numerous times before, Bill Cullen became his replacement. As Cullen's time as host continued on, Mark Goodson noted how Cullen's serving as host, rather than as a panelist, hurt the chemistry he had shared with Cass and Carlisle. A decision was made to have Cullen return to the panel permanently and give semi-regular panelist Joe Garagiola the hosting position. Using a baseball term for "substitute," Garagiola stated that he was "pinch hitter" for Moore, who returned to the series for a farewell performance on the ninth-season premiere in 1977. Moore explained why he had left the program, then after presiding over one last game, announced his final retirement from television and handed the host position to Garagiola permanently. To Tell the Truth ended production at the end of the season.

Johnny Olson stayed with To Tell the Truth when it moved to syndication. He left in 1972, when he moved to Los Angeles to announce the Goodson-Todman revivals of The Price Is Right and I've Got a Secret. NBC staff announcer Bill Wendell succeeded Olson from 1972 to 1977, with Alan Kalter taking over during the final season. Don Pardo, also an NBC staff announcer, served as a backup to Wendell and Kalter.

To Tell the Truth used three distinctive sets throughout its nine-year syndicated run. The first, designed by Theodore Cooper and making heavy use of the psychedelic art styles popular in the period, was used for the first two seasons and the first four weeks of the third; those designs were muted somewhat with pastel shades on the second set used from that point through the first 30 weeks of the fourth season. The third—and longest-lived—set, which Cooper also designed, was a mostly-blue block motif with gold accents, and included a large on-stage representation of the show's new logo, which made use of stacking and interlocking letters, behind the panel. This set was used for the remainder of the run, and the logo would be reused on the future 1990 revival.

This version featured a lyrical, pop music-styled theme song written and composed by Score Productions chief Bob Israel and Truth producer Paul Alter, along with veteran theme composer Charles Fox; an instrumental, and orchestral, version would be used for the 1990 series.

The bulk of this version is intact. However, the current status of the first season is unknown, and is presumed to be lost to wiping. GSN has never rerun the first season of the show, and had always begun with the second season, in 1970. One episode from the first season exists in the UCLA Film and Television Archive. Buzzr began airing episodes from 1973 in October 2018.

On the October 5, 1973, episode, one of the challengers was Georg Olden, who disclosed that he was the graphic designer who created the "To Tell the Truth man" icon that was used during the 1956–1978 seasons.

=== 1980–1981, syndication ===
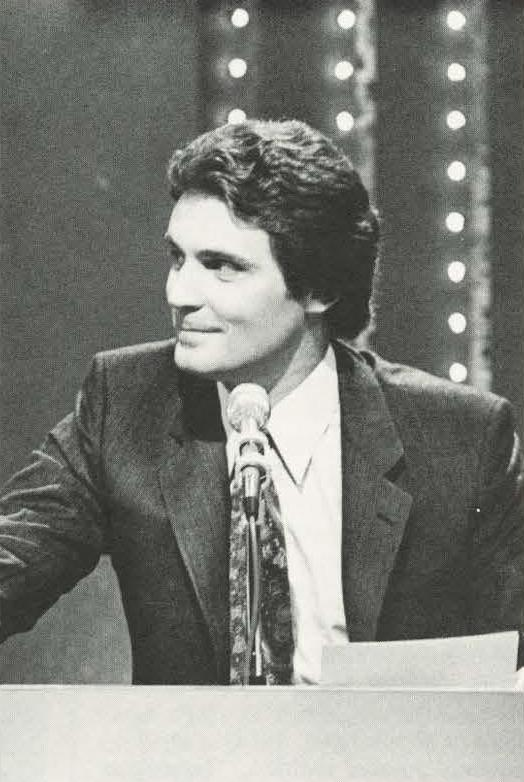
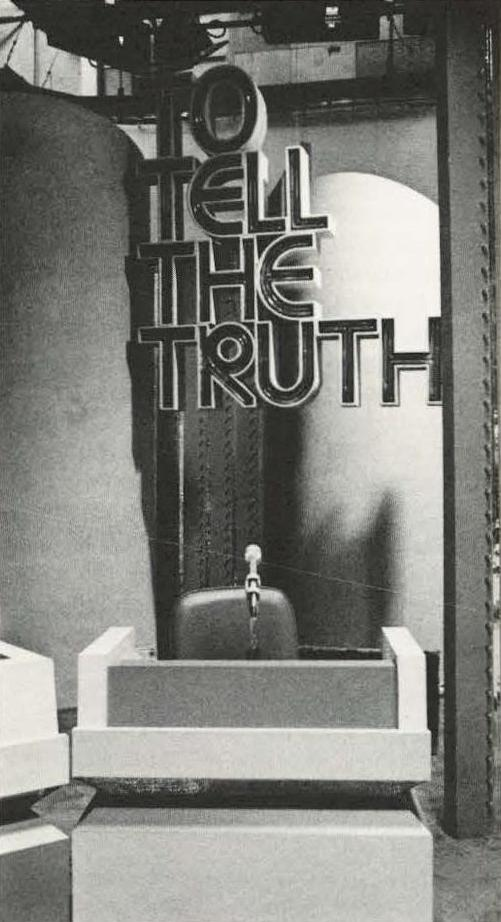
Host Robin Ward and the set of the 1980–1981 series

On September 8, 1980, a new To Tell the Truth series premiered in syndication. The new series emanated once again from Rockefeller Plaza in New York, and Canadian television personality Robin Ward served as the host, with Alan Kalter returning as announcer. A new theme and set were commissioned for this edition of Truth. Even though previous regulars Bill Cullen, Peggy Cass, and Kitty Carlisle made frequent appearances, there was no regular panel for this edition. The new Truth aired for one season in syndication, but it never recaptured the popularity of the original, and aired its final episode on June 12, 1981, with reruns airing until September 11, 1981.

Two games were played, and each wrong vote paid the challengers $100; $500 was paid if the entire panel had been fooled. No consolation prize was given if the entire panel correctly identified the subject.

After the second game, a new game called "One on One" was played with the four impostors from earlier. One fact had been purposely withheld from the panel about one of the impostors and it was up to the panelists to determine correctly to which of the impostors it applied. One at a time, each panelist would be given twenty seconds to question the impostor sitting directly across from him or her and would then say whether he or she believed the fact applied to that impostor. Wrong votes still paid $100, with $500 paid if the panel did not correctly determine to whom the fact pertained.

The 1980 edition of To Tell the Truth was a rarity in that it was still based in New York while nearly all television game show production had moved to California by this point. There was only one other game show in production during the run of this To Tell the Truth series that emanated from New York. The $50,000 Pyramid, which premiered at the midway point of the 1980-81 season, was the other; the series was taped at ABC’s Studio TV-15, the former Elysee Theater, on West 58th Street. These two would be the last non-cable productions to tape regularly in New York until 1999 when Who Wants to Be a Millionaire? premiered on ABC.

=== 1990–1991, NBC ===
To Tell the Truth returned to NBC for a run that lasted only eight months, from September 3, 1990 (Labor Day) to May 31, 1991. Unlike previous versions that originated from New York, the 1990 version was taped at NBC's The Burbank Studios in California. The show's theme music was an orchestral remix of the 1969–78 theme (minus the lyrics), and the show utilized the block-letter logo from 1973 to 1978. All episodes of this series exist and have aired on GSN in reruns.

Actor Richard Kline hosted two pilot episodes with Charlie O'Donnell as announcer; one of these was accidentally aired as the premiere episode in the Eastern and Central time zones. Australian A Current Affair reporter Gordon Elliott hosted To Tell the Truth for its first eight weeks (September 3 to October 26, 1990). The bespectacled Elliott bore a passing resemblance to former To Tell the Truth emcee and panelist Bill Cullen. A dispute with Elliott's former employers in Australia temporarily forced him off American television altogether; his replacement was then-frequent panelist Lynn Swann. Swann, the first African-American host of To Tell the Truth, hosted the show for the next 14 weeks (October 29, 1990 to February 1, 1991) until his job as a reporter for ABC Sports at the time forced him to leave. Alex Trebek was brought in as his replacement for the remainder of the run (February 4 to May 31, 1991), at the same time he was hosting Classic Concentration on NBC and Jeopardy! in syndication. Mark Goodson filled in for two episodes Trebek missed when his wife Jean went into labor during a taping with their son Matthew. The announcer for the 1990 series was Burton Richardson (O'Donnell served as his substitute).

The celebrity panelists for To Tell the Truth during this period included several of the 1970s panel stalwarts, including Kitty Carlisle, who appeared on a majority of the shows, taking the fourth and most upstage seat. The first seat, furthest downstage, saw Ron Masak and Orson Bean alternate on the panel for 34 of the 39 weeks the series was on air. The chair next to that was occupied by rotating guests, although voice actress Dana Hill appeared in the seat most often. The third chair most often featured David Niven Jr. as a panelist, although Masak and Bean would also sit there if both were to appear on the same program. Polly Bergen and Peggy Cass, who began appearing on the original series, would appear from time to time, and other frequent panelists included Vicki Lawrence, Cindy Adams, and Betty White. The panelists were introduced in twos, with the male panelists escorting the female panelists down the set's main staircase, followed by the host. For one week, Monty Hall (who would later replace Bob Hilton as a permanent guest host on the 1990 version of Let's Make a Deal) sat in the first seat.

Two games were played with two sets of impostors. Any incorrect votes up to two paid $1,000. If three of the panelists had voted incorrectly, the players split $1,500. On the pilot, each incorrect vote earned $500. If the panel was fooled entirely, the players split $3,000.

After the second game, a new version of the "One on One" game from the 1980 series was played. A seventh civilian player was brought out with two stories, and a member of the studio audience was given an opportunity to win money by trying to figure out which of the two of those was true. Each panelist was given the opportunity to ask the contestant one question for each story, and after both stories had been presented the audience member chose which one he or she thought was the truth. After the choice was made, the contestant revealed the right answer and if the audience member came up with it, he or she won $500. If the contestant stumped the audience member, that player won $1,000.

Occasionally, celebrities whose faces were not well known would attempt to stump the audience during this part of the game. For example, Hank Ketcham, the creator of Dennis the Menace and a challenger on the original To Tell the Truth in May 1962, tried during the show's Christmas Day episode to convince an audience member that he was really the songwriter to "Rudolph the Red-Nosed Reindeer" (Johnny Marks had actually done this), but was unsuccessful in doing so.

=== 2000–2002, syndication ===
The show then had a two-year run in syndication, starting in 2000, with John O'Hurley hosting, and Burton Richardson returning as the announcer. The series was again produced at NBC Studios in Burbank, California. Gary Stockdale supplied the music for this edition. In most markets, it was paired up with Family Feud, which was then hosted by Louie Anderson; O'Hurley would eventually join that program in 2006 and host it until 2010, when Steve Harvey took over.

Actor Meshach Taylor was the only regular to appear on every episode of this edition, while Paula Poundstone was a regular during the first season. Panelists appearing in at least six weeks of episodes included Brooke Burns, Dave Coulier, Brad Sherwood, Traci Bingham, Kim Coles, and Cindy Margolis. The show's website touted Coles and Burns as regulars for season two in place of Poundstone, though neither panelist was featured in every show that year. Kitty Carlisle appeared as a panelist for one episode in the first season, making her the only panelist to have appeared on all incarnations of this show to that point. It was Carlisle's final appearance in the franchise before her death in 2007.

This edition of To Tell the Truth brought back the audience vote that the original series had last used. Its vote was revealed after the panel had cast their votes, just before O'Hurley asked for the subject to identify himself or herself. Each incorrect vote paid $1,000, with a maximum of $5,000 available if the challengers managed to completely fool both the panel and the audience. (A tie in the audience vote or panel disqualification counted as a wrong vote, as they had in previous versions.) In the first several weeks of shows, a game that resulted in five incorrect votes was worth $10,000 for the challengers.

According to Steve Beverly's tvgameshows.net, this edition of Truth never received a rating higher than 1.8. It was cancelled on January 28, 2002, only 96 episodes into its second season. However, repeats continued to air through March 15, 2002. Episodes of this series have aired on GSN in reruns.

=== 2016–2022, ABC ===
ABC ordered six episodes of the show, hosted by Anthony Anderson, which taped in July 2015 and began airing on ABC on June 14, 2016. Anderson is the second African-American host of the franchise; the first was Lynn Swann on the short-lived 1990 NBC daytime version.

The new, weekly 60-minute primetime series, while maintaining the show's core gameplay elements, presented itself as more of a comedy series. Most notably, it refocused the competition on the panelists themselves, who received points for correctly identifying the central character(s) in each round; at show's end, the winning panelist was briefly recognized while the "loser" was made to suffer a small comical humiliation. No mention was ever made on-air as to compensation to the central characters or impostors.

Also appearing on the new series was Doris Day Bowman, Anderson's mother, presented as the "scorekeeper." In some cases, where a panelist knows the central character or one of the impostors, Bowman also plays on their behalf. When Anderson's family appeared on Celebrity Family Feud, the behavior of "Mama Doris" was so outrageous that the producers approached Anderson about having her on To Tell The Truth.

The first season also included a house band, Cheche and His Band of Liars, and David Scott as an offstage announcer; these were replaced in season 2 by prerecorded music and an introduction provided by Anderson himself.

In this version, most contestants introduce themselves solely by claiming the central character's story, rather than by name (e.g., "I was a Bond girl" rather than "My name is ..."); some panels have contestants of different genders. The questioning period is not split distinctly among the panelists, and Anderson and Bowman often participate in the questioning.

Five rounds were played per episode, along with one additional round entitled "Before You Go", which was played with the two impostors of the just-completed round, one of whom had their own story.

Many episodes include a demonstration by one of the central characters.

==== Scoring ====
Panelists receive 10 points for correctly identifying the central character in each round, or 20 points for the final round (1 and 2 points in earlier episodes).

At the end of the episode, the losing panelist is subjected to some sort of minor humiliation; if panelists are tied, Bowman chooses the loser. In season one, the losing panelist was subjected to "Tweet a Lie," in which Anderson posted an embarrassing tweet to that panelist's Twitter account. In later episodes, the panelist was awarded a "dummy" crown by Bowman and asked to promenade in the style of a beauty pageant winner.

Starting with the August 11, 2019, episode, panelists who earn a perfect score win the "Doris Award," a gold-colored bust of Bowman. Only three panelists have won the Doris Award: Oliver Hudson, on September 22, 2019; Deon Cole, on June 25, 2020; and Michael Strahan, on August 6, 2020. (Bowman had to play one round on Strahan's behalf, as he knew the central characters.)

==== Panelists ====
The first season featured three regular panelists: Betty White, NeNe Leakes, and Jalen Rose; White has appeared on all three broadcast network versions of the show. In season two, the regular panelists were eliminated.

To maintain social distancing during the COVID-19 pandemic, the sixth season reduced the number of panelists from four to three.

Four panelists made ten or more appearances on the show: Sherri Shepherd (eleven), Nikki Glaser (ten), Joel McHale (ten), and Jalen Rose (ten, including six as a season one regular). Former host Alex Trebek was a panelist in a 2018 episode, making him the first host to appear on a subsequent version as a panelist.

== Merchandise ==
A board game was released by Lowell in 1957.

During the run of the 2000 version, a single-player online game was offered by the short-lived website Uproar.com, and promoted by host John O'Hurley at the end of each episode.

A video slot machine game, based on the 1969 version, was released to American casinos nationwide by Bally Gaming Systems in 2002.

== International versions ==
Country	Name	Host(s)	TV station	Premiere	Finale
Australia	Tell the Truth	George Foster	Nine Network	1959	1965
Australia	Tell the Truth	Mike Williamson	Nine Network	1959	1965
Australia	Tell the Truth	Earle Bailey	Network Ten	1971	1972
Brazil	Acredite Em Quem Quiser (Believe Who You Want; a segment of the variety show Domingão com Huck)	Luciano Huck	TV Globo	2022	present
Bulgaria	Кажи честно Kaji chestno ("Tell Me Honestly")	Raya Peeva and Krasimira Demirova	bTV	November 7, 2024	May 9, 2025
Canada (in English)	To Tell the Truth	Don Cameron	CTV	1962	1964
Chile	Quién soy Yo ("Who am I?")	Enrique Bravo Menadier	TVN; Canal 13	1967; 1970	1970; 1979
Chile	¿Quién dice la verdad? ("Who tells the Truth?")	Rafael Araneda	Chilevisión	2017	2017
Czech Republic	S pravdou ven ("With The Truth Out")	Tomáš Měcháček	Prima	May 3, 2018	June 28, 2018
Germany	Sag die Wahrheit ("Tell the Truth")	Guido Baumann; Hans Sachs; Wolf Mittler; Hans Stotz; Bernd Stephan; Gerd Rubenbauer; Michael Antwerpes	ARD	1959	1971
Germany	Sag die Wahrheit ("Tell the Truth")	Guido Baumann; Hans Sachs; Wolf Mittler; Hans Stotz; Bernd Stephan; Gerd Rubenbauer; Michael Antwerpes	Bayerischer Rundfunk	1986	1995
Germany	Sag die Wahrheit ("Tell the Truth")	Guido Baumann; Hans Sachs; Wolf Mittler; Hans Stotz; Bernd Stephan; Gerd Rubenbauer; Michael Antwerpes	SWR	2003	present
Greece	Πείτε την αλήθεια Peíte tin alítheia ("Tell the Truth")	Betty Livanou	YENED	1972	1972
Italy	La verità ("The Truth")	Marco Balestri	Canale 5	1990	1991
Italy	La verità ("The Truth")	Marco Balestri	Rete 4	1991	1995
Netherlands	Wie van de Drie ("Which of the Three")	Nand Baert; Pim Jacobs; Herman Emmink; Flip van der Schalie; Fred Oster	AVRO	1963	1983
Netherlands	Wie van de Drie ("Which of the Three")	Caroline Tensen	RTL4	1991	1991
Netherlands	Wie van de Drie ("Which of the Three")	Rob van Hulst; Jos Kuijer; Joop Braakhekke	AVRO	1994	1997
Netherlands	Wie van de Drie ("Which of the Three")	Ron Brandsteder	Omroep MAX	2010	2013
Netherlands	Wie van de Drie ("Which of the Three")	Wendy van Dijk	SBS6	2020	2025
Norway	På ære og samvittighet ("Of Honor")	Kari Borg Mannsåker; Gunnar Haarberg	NRK	1958	1962
Norway	På ære og samvittighet ("Of Honor")	Kari Borg Mannsåker; Gunnar Haarberg	NRK	1970	1970
Norway	På ære og samvittighet ("Of Honor")	Kari Borg Mannsåker; Gunnar Haarberg	NRK	1986	1986
Slovakia	S pravdou von ("With the Truth Out")	Juraj Tabaček	TV JOJ	January 10, 2019	March 9, 2021
Spain	¿Quién dice la verdad? ("Who tells the Truth?")	Juan Antonio Fernández Abajo	TVE	October 2, 1965	September 23, 1966
Thailand	สาบานว่าพูดจริง ("Sworn Truth"); To Tell the Truth	Sunya Kunakon	ONE	2016	2017
Turkey	Üç Yalancı ("Three Liars")	Cenk Koray; Olcay Poyraz; Üstün Savcı; Göktay Alpman	TRT	1970s	1970s
Turkey	Üç Yalancı ("Three Liars")	Cenk Koray; Olcay Poyraz; Üstün Savcı; Göktay Alpman	Channel 1	1970s	1970s
Ukraine	Самозванці; Samozvantsi ("Imposters")	Anton Lirnyk	ICTV	September 3, 2011	March 3, 2012
United Kingdom	Tell the Truth	McDonald Hobley	ITV	September 17, 1957	September 6, 1961
United Kingdom	Tell the Truth	David Jacobs	ITV	September 17, 1957	September 6, 1961
United Kingdom	Tell the Truth	Shaw Taylor	ITV	September 17, 1957	September 6, 1961
United Kingdom	Tell the Truth	Graeme Garden	Channel 4	April 17, 1983	November 22, 1985
United Kingdom	Tell the Truth	Fred Dinenage	ITV	April 11, 1989	October 26, 1990
