= List of German-language playwrights =

This is a list of German-language playwrights.

== A ==
- Herbert Achternbusch (1938–2022)
- Alois Außerer (1876–1950)

== B ==
- Wolfgang Bauer (1941–2005)
- Thomas Bernhard (1931–1989)
- Leo Birinski (1884–1951)
- Nicolai Borger (born 1974)
- Bertolt Brecht (1898–1956)
- Georg Büchner (1813–1837)

== D ==
- Friedrich Dürrenmatt (1921–1990)

== F ==
- Gustav Freytag (1816–1895)

== G ==
- Johann Wolfgang von Goethe (1749–1832)

== H ==
- Peter Handke (born 1942)
- Gerhart Hauptmann (1862–1946)
- Wolfgang Hildesheimer (1916–1991)
- Ödön von Horváth (1901–1938)

== J ==
- Elfriede Jelinek (born 1946)
- Hanns Johst (1890–1978)

== K ==
- Georg Kaiser (1878–1945)
- Heinrich von Kleist (1777–1811)
- Karl Kraus (1874–1936)
- Franz Xaver Kroetz (born 1946)

== L ==
- Else Lasker-Schüler (1869–1945)
- Gotthold Ephraim Lessing (1729–1781)

== M ==
- Andreas Mand (born 1959)
- Lucas Maius (1522–1598)
- Klaus Mann (1906–1949)
- Marius von Mayenburg (born 1972)
- Heiner Müller (1929–1995)
- Robert Musil (1880–1942)
- Johann Nestroy (1801–1862)

== P ==
- Ulrich Plenzdorf (1934–2007)

== S ==
- Friedrich Schiller (1759–1805)
- Roland Schimmelpfennig (born 1967)

== T ==
- Ludwig Tieck (1773–1853)
- Ernst Toller (1893–1939)
- Kurt Tucholsky (1890–1935)
- Peter Turrini (born 1944)

== W ==
- Robert Walser (1878–1956)
- Frank Wedekind (1864–1918)
- Peter Weiss (1916–1982)
- Franz Werfel (1890–1945)
- Urs Widmer (1938–2014)

== Z ==
- Carl Zuckmayer (1896–1977)
- Stefan Zweig (1881–1942)

== See also ==
- List of Germans
- List of German journalists
- List of German-language authors
- List of German-language philosophers
- List of German-language poets
