= Julia Scharf =

German television presenter

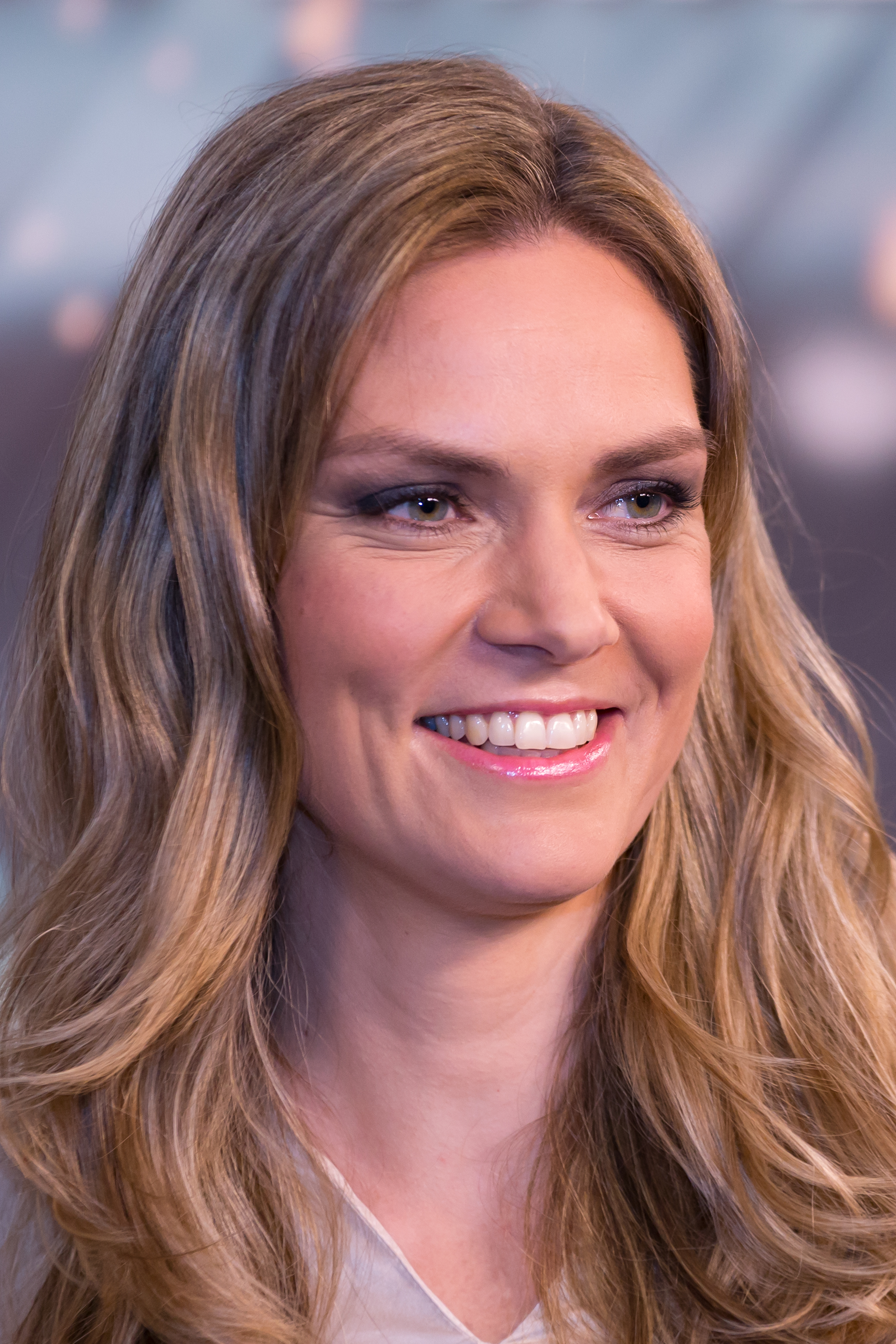
- Scharf in 2018
- Born: 3 January 1981 (age 45); Gera, Thuringia, Germany
- Occupation: Television presenter
- Years active: 2006–present (television)
- Television: Sport1 (2008–2011); SWR Fernsehen (2011–present); Das Erste (2011–present); BR Fernsehen (2016–present)

Julia Scharf (born 3 January 1981) is a German television presenter.

== Life and career ==
Julia Scharf was born in Gera in the region of Thuringia and grew up in Zorneding, Upper Bavaria. She ended school in 2000 with her Abitur. She then studied from 2001 to 2006 sports science and media communication at the Technical University of Munich.

She joined Sport1 in 2008 after various internships and presentings. In summer 2010, she was the presenter of Bundesliga Pur and SPORT1 News. She was also a field reporter for the IPTV broadcaster LIGA total! by Deutsche Telekom. Since November 2011, she presented on SWR Fernsehen for the programs Sport im Dritten, Sport Extra and Sport am Samstag. She also presents the sports section on the Tagesthemen and the gymnastic events on ARD. For Das Erste, she presents the sky jumping and also alpine skiing since the 2014 Winter Olympics in Sochi. She also presents since August 2014 the Sportschau on Sunday.

Since 11 April 2016, she presents the program Blickpunkt Sport on BR Fernsehen and also the Sportblock on the Rundschau. In 2018, she presented the reporting of the matches of the 2018 FIFA World Cup in Russia.

== Personal life ==
Julia Scharf lives in Munich and is the mother of two daughters. Since 13 June 2013, she is married with former athlete and marketing manager Michael Mosler.

== Television programs ==
=== As presenter ===
- 2010–2011: Sport 1 News on Sport1
- 2010–2011: Bundesliga Pur on Sport1
- Since 2011: Sport im Dritten on SWR Fernsehen
- Since 2011: Sport am Samstag on SWR Fernsehen
- Since 2011: Sport extra on SWR Fernsehen
- Since 2011: Tagesthemen on Das Erste
- Since 2011: Sportschau live: Turnen on Das Erste
- Since 2013: Sportschau live: Ski alpin on Das Erste
- Since 2013: Sportschau live: Kanu on Das Erste
- Since 2013: Sportschau Club on Das Erste
- Since 2014: Sportschau am Sonntag on Das Erste
- Since 2016: Blickpunkt Sport on BR Fernsehen
- Since 2016: Rundschau on BR Fernsehen
- Since 2019: Abendschau on BR Fernsehen

=== As interviewer ===
- 2008–2011: Bundesliga live on Liga total!
- Since 2011: Sportschau live: Skispringen on Das Erste
- Since 2014: Sportschau live: DTM on Das Erste
- Since 2014: Sportschau live: Turnen on Das Erste
