= Annika Zimmermann =

German television presenter and journalist

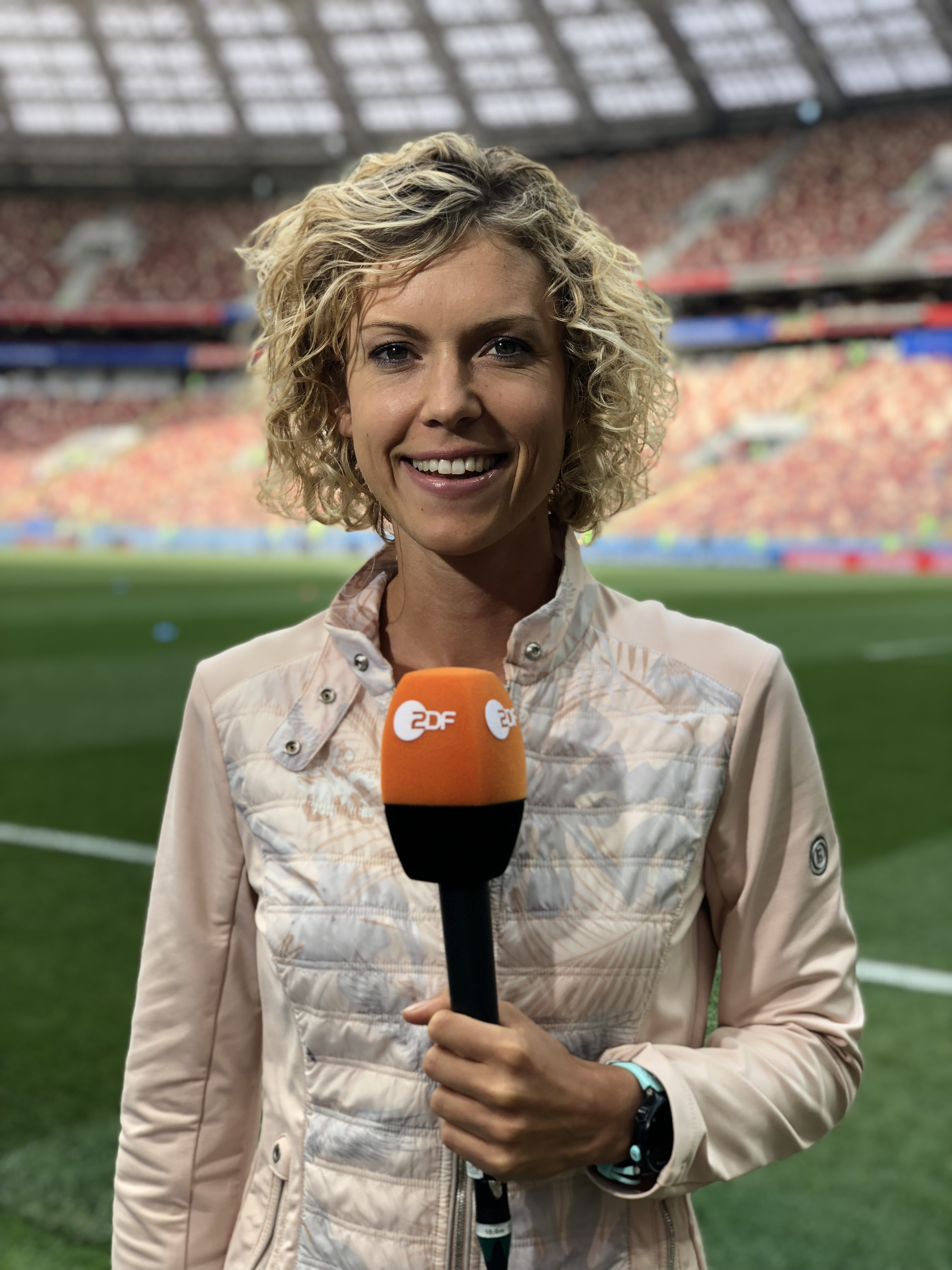
- Zimmermann in Russia, 2018
- Born: 29 March 1989; Darmstadt
- Education: Abitur
- Occupations: Television presenter, journalist
- Website: annika-zimmermann.de

Annika Zimmermann (born 29 March 1989 in Darmstadt) is a German television personality and journalist.

== Career and Life ==
Zimmermann studied in Munich applied media science with a focus on sports journalism. As of the second semester, she also worked as a freelancer in the sports department of SPORT1. This was followed by activity as a moderator, reporter and editor at the online portal Spox.com, from 2013 to 2014. For this she was asked during the 2014 World Cup, among others, the Germany national football team.

Zimmermann has worked for ZDF since 15 September 2014, being the sports host in the morning show "ZDF Morgenmagazin". In 2015 she was awarded the German Sports Journalist Award for Best Newcomer.

In addition to moderation and editorial Zimmermann is also used as a reporter at ZDF. She reported on the Olympic Games in Rio de Janeiro, the European Football Championship in France, the Ironman Triathlon World Cup in Hawaii, the Tour de France or the World Cup in Russia.

In the spring of 2018, her book Fit and Cheerful was published by Droemer Knaur. Together with co-author and sports scientist Timo Kirchenberger, Zimmermann wrote a guide on fitness, nutrition and mindfulness in everyday life.

From 2021 on, Zimmermann was part of the moderation team of Amazon Prime that shows UEFA Champions League. She did field interviews and hosted the highlight show.

In 2024, Zimmermann left the TV-World. She started to increasingly study topics around personal development, breathwork and conscious-oriented methods.

Today she gives workshops in media training, mentors athletes, leaders and entrepreneurs in presence under pressure.

== Personal life ==
Zimmermann lives in Greece since 2020. She is married to Patrick Ashworth and took on his last name after the wedding in 2025. Next to her work in personal development, she loves sport and nature.
