= Sabine Rollberg =

German professor

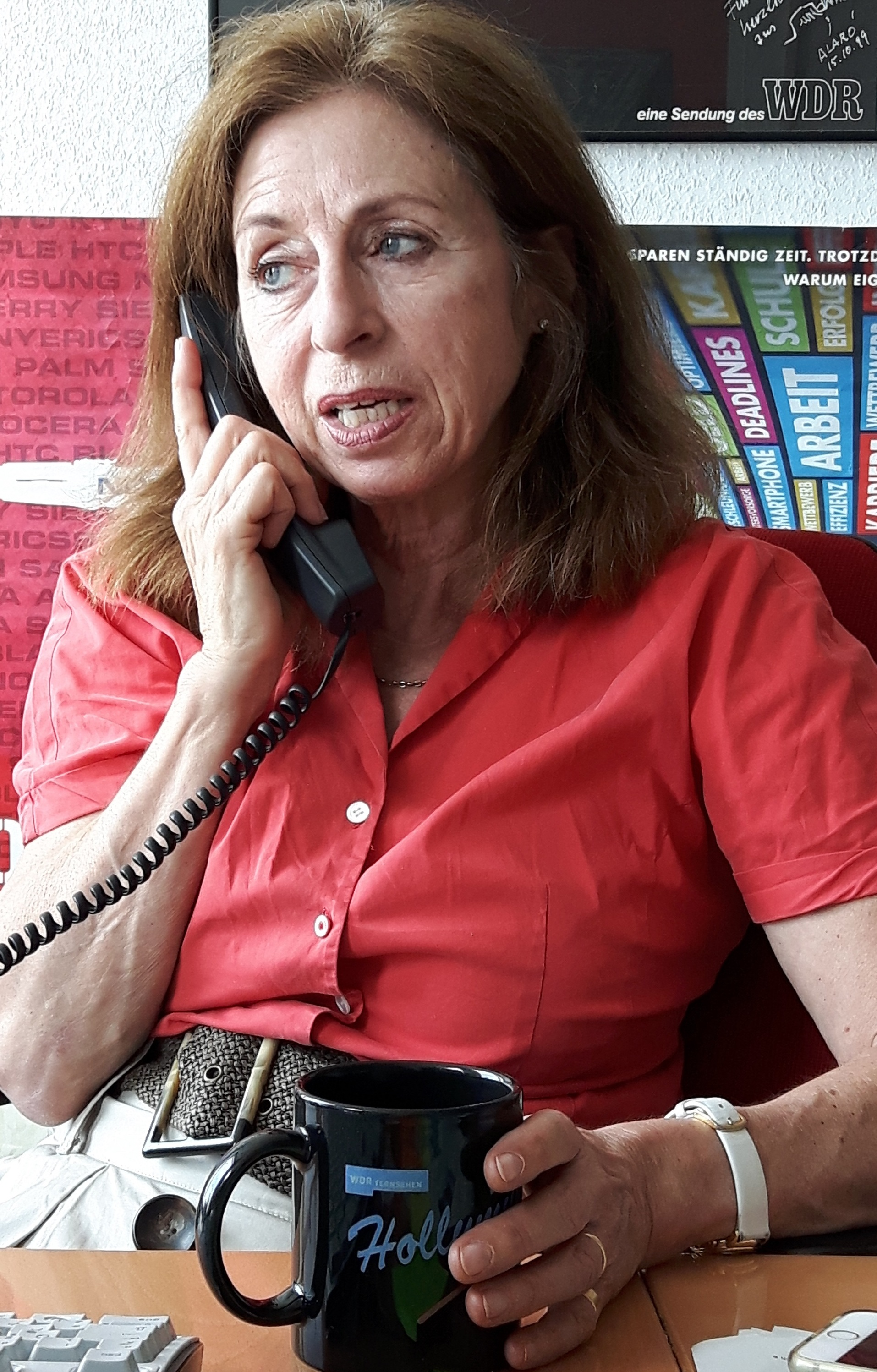
Sabine Rollberg, Westdeutscher Rundfunk (2016)

Sabine Rollberg (born 9 August 1953 in Freiburg im Breisgau) is a German Professor of Artistic Television Formats, Film and Television, as well a former commissioner and head of the editorial department of Arte at the Westdeutscher Rundfunk (WDR). She developed and oversaw an array of diverse TV programmes and has also become internationally known as a dedicated editor and promoter of documentary film. From September 2008 to April 2019 she taught at the Academy of Media Arts Cologne (Kunsthochschule für Medien Köln). In 2014, the Grimme Award laureate was appointed to the advisory board of the University of Freiburg (Albert-Ludwigs-Universität Freiburg) and University College Freiburg.

== Life and studies ==
Sabine Rollberg grew up in an artistic family in Freiburg, the daughter of the actor Will Rollberg (born 12 May 1916 in Halle (Saale), Germany, died 28 August 2009 in Freiburg) and the solo dancer Gyp Schlicht Rollberg, née Gerda Ursula Elisabeth Schlicht (born 2 December 1917 in Chemnitz, died 22 November 2015 in Freiburg). Even as a small child she was treading the boards: from 1959 to 1969, she performed as a child actor in all Christmas fairy tales (Weihnachtsmärchen) staged at Theater Freiburg; subsequently, she took on bigger parts at the Wallgraben-Theater. At school, she also had speaking parts in schools' broadcasts and audio plays for the Südwestfunk at their Freiburg studio. She also worked freelance for Badische Zeitung. After her Abitur (general qualification for university entrance) at the Berthold Gymnasium Freiburg, she studied German, History and Politics at the University of Freiburg (Albert-Ludwigs-Universität Freiburg) (1973–1974 and 1976–1980) and at the University of Bonn (Rheinische Friedrich-Wilhelms-Universität Bonn) (1974–1976). In 1980, she gained her PhD with a dissertation titled ″Von der Wiederauferstehung des deutschen Geistes. Eine Analyse des Feuilletons der Neuen Zeitung 1945–1949 (On the Resurrection of the German Intellect. An Analysis of the Arts Section of the Neue Zeitung 1935–1949″. From 1980 to 1982, she did an internship at Westdeutscher Rundfunk (WDR).

Rollberg has one daughter and lives in Freiburg.

== Television editor ==
Since 1982, Rollberger has been working as an editor for various programme sections within WDR Television. Until 1984, she was in charge of Weltspiegel within the programme section Foreign Affairs, as well as of ARD-Brennpunkt, of the concept and editing of Kulturweltspiegel and Kinderweltspiegel; she also presented the foreign affairs programme Treffpunkt Dritte Welt. As the editor of the programme sections Culture and Science, she was responsible for Kulturweltspiegel and Pacz & Co, for up-to-date arts coverage and major live revue programmes such as Mai-Revue, Alle Jahre wieder, Vatertagsrevue, Silvesterrevue. Furthermore, she presented the talk show Leute of the Sender Freies Berlin (SFB), broadcast live from Berlin's Cafe Kranzler. From 1989 to 1994, she was foreign correspondent for the ARD at their Paris studio. In 2001, her leadership bid for the Deutsche Welle was unsuccessful. She lost the election for the post of Director General to the SPD politician Erik Bettermann with 7 to 10 votes. As a pioneer of quality television, she has continuously sustained her commitment to maintaining and distributing significant formats and products in TV and film.

== Arte expert ==
When, on 30 April 1991, the Franco-German television channel Arte was established, Sabine Rollberg followed the programming policies of this new binational channel focusing on the arts and Europe with keen interest. From 1994 to 1997, she was the editor-in-chief of Arte at the channel's Strasbourg headquarters.

Amongst others, the new live news programme 7 1/2 was established under her leadership. Thereby, she clearly emphasised the significance of pluralism and opinion forming in a common Europe: „We are more than just an arts channel. The second string to our bow, and our other major concern, is Europe. (…) In this day and age, our home is Europe. Unfortunately, our programme is not in line with current trends, as all countries are showing a propensity towards national egotism. International issues, regrettably, find less favour, but we are deliberately swimming against the current, since Europe is close to our hearts.“

In 1999, after two years of maternity leave in Moscow, she returned to Cologne as the WDR's Arte Commissioner and Managing Editor of Arte/3Sat in the WDR. From October 2005 to the end of 2009, she managed the department of the programme section Arts Channels (Programmgruppe Kulturkanäle) in the WDR and helped set up the satellite TV channel Einsfestival. She has been editor-in-chief of WDR/ARTE from 2008 to 2018.

== Professorial appointment ==
In order to pass on her comprehensive knowledge and (traditional) values regarding quality in public broadcasting to the next generation, she accepted a professorship at the Academy of Media Arts Cologne (Kunsthochschule für Medien Köln) teaching from September 2008 to April 2019. Her lectures as a guest professor include “The Future of Documentary Film in a Changing Media Landscape” („Die Zukunft des Dokumentarfilms in einer sich wandelnden Medienlandschaft“), given as part of the lecture series “Social Innovation” („Gesellschaftliche Innovation“) at the Munich University of Applied Sciences (Hochschule für Angewandte Wissenschaften München) in 2015. Since 2014, she has been a member of the Advisory Board of the University of Freiburg, and since 2009, a specialist advisor for Eurodoc. Sabine Rollberg is particularly concerned with maintaining and promoting documentary feature film as an integral part of public television programming. Undeterred by the ever-increasing quota pressures on television networks and the general commercialisation of TV programmes, she supports idiosyncratic and non-conformist documentary film projects, always focused on hard-hitting topics and their social and cultural significance. Rollberg has consistently advocated “creative freedom in format television“. At major documentary film festivals, she passionately stresses the importance of the documentary film genre, and she was awarded the Dickes Fell (Thick Skin) Award of the Consortium for Documentary Film (Arbeitsgemeinschaft Dokumentarfilm) in autumn 2009.

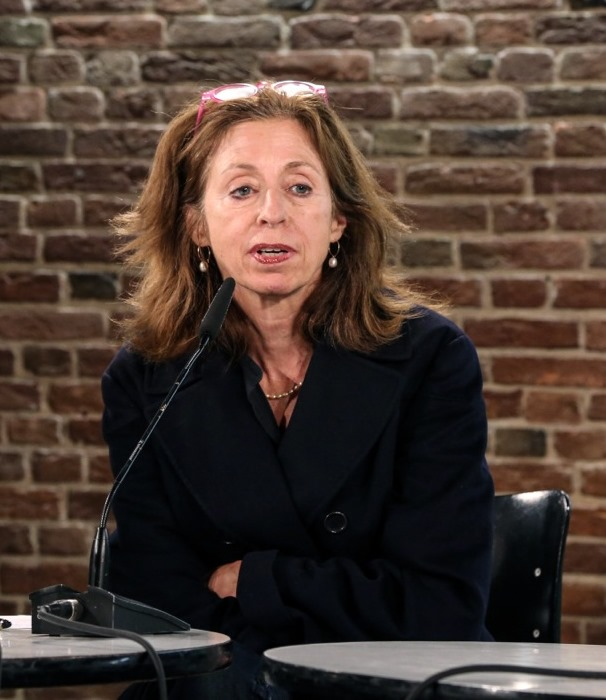
Sabine Rollberg, Academy of Arts, Berlin (2009)

== Quotes ==
- „Since I hold the firm conviction that a democratic society needs documentary film as a vital, inalienable component of its commonwealth – as, for instance, it gives a voice to the underprivileged, or denounces human rights violations all over the world –, I consider it my duty to draw attention to the fact that documentary formats are at risk, despite ongoing rhetoric to the contrary.
- When we are moved by a documentary film, we are more than just informed, we are changed. Thus, Hubert Sauper's film Darwin's Nightmare triggered a consumer boycott of Nile perch in France, Italy and Denmark.
- A documentary film maker goes where no one has yet looked or nobody is looking any more. More than just meeting the viewer, he takes him to worlds he doesn't know yet. What loss would it be to a society if they could no longer experience the silence of monks in a Carthusian monastery, share the joy of a class of French schoolchildren or learn that politicians sometimes act utterly unconventionally, such as the Uruguayan president José Mujica, alias El Pepe, whom viewers can watch at work? That is, a president who donates two thirds of his salary to social projects, not because he – a former Tupamaro – does not need it for himself, but simply out of conviction.
- Conviction and truthfulness are the essence of documentary films, and our society needs these twoqualities like the air we breathe. A society that is rapidly changing and inundated with images from the internet needs people who gather images, organise them and provide signposts in a world of confusion. […] Documentary film makers do not want to lecture but to reveal; they do not present themselves as prophets but as unorthodox thinkers who give us stimuli, food for thought and guidance.
- There are a great many good films that are currently funded by idealism and proactive resourcefulness, which could easily fill entire programme sections – in fact, much more cheaply than any series. Claas Danielsen […] has calculated that: „The costs of only one 43 minutes long episode of a weekly fictional series significantly exceed the entire annual budget of a weekly documentary programme slot. Three episodes of such a series would last just over two hours and cost an estimated 1 Million Euros. Take the same amount as the annual budget for a documentary slot, and you would get 78 programme hours for an audience of millions.”

== Awards ==
Many films promoted by Sabine Rollberg have received national and international awards, including the German Film Award (Deutscher Filmpreis) LOLA (formerly Federal Film Award (Bundesfilmpreis)), the Grimme Preis, the European Film Awards (Europäischer Filmpreis), the Prix Italia, the Golden Gate Award (San Francisco), several Human Rights Awards (Lost Children 2005, Hunt for Justice (Jagd nach Gerechtigkeit) 2007 and The Green Wave/Iran Elections 2009) and the Journalist Award (Journalistenpreis) for Half Moon Over Cologne (Halbmond über Köln) 2012.

Some award-winning films (selection):

- The Jazzman from the Gulag, Prix Italia und Emmy Award 1999
- Rivers and Tides – Andy Goldsworthy Working With Time, Federal Film Award (Bundesfilmpreis) 2003 and Golden Gate Award 2001
- Bellaria – As Long As We Live! (Bellaria – So lange wir leben!), Prix Europa 2002 und The Silver Plaque For Best Documentary, Chicago International Filmfestival 2002
- Darwin's Nightmare, European Film Award (Europäischer Filmpreis ) 2004, Oscar nomination
- Lost Children (2005 film), Lost Children, German Film Award (Deutscher Filmpreis) LOLA 2006 for Best Documentary Film
- Losers and Winners, Adolf-Grimme-Preis 2009
- Dancedreams -– Youths Dancing KONTAKTHOF (Tanzträume – Jugendliche tanzen KONTAKTHOF) von Pina Bausch, Award for Best Documentary Film at the Cinedans Film Festival, Amsterdam 2010
- Burma VJ, Grand Prix FIFDH 2010, Grand Prix FIFDH 2010, Festival du Film International sur les Droits Humains, Geneva, and Grand Prix, International Human Rights Film Festival, Oscar nomination
- The Green Wave, Adolf Grimme Award 2010 in the category Culture and Information
- Gerhard Richter Painting, German Film Award (Deutscher Filmpreis) LOLA 2012, Best Documentary Film
- Miles & War, Best Documentary Feature, Berlin 2014, Gold Plaque Television Awards 2014, Chicago International Film Festival
- Camp 14: Total Control Zone, Grimme Award 2015, Grand Prix FIFDH du meilleur documentaire de création, FIFDH Geneva 2013, Eurodok Award 2013, Oslo
- Vita Activa: The Spirit auf Hannah Arendt, Documentary Film Award, Santa Barbara International Film Festival 2016
- Divine Situation, (Göttliche Lage), Grimme Award 2016
- The Other Side of Everything, IDFA Award for Best Feature-Length Documentary, Amsterdam 2017

== Speeches and lectures ==
- Gert von Paczenky. Founder of Panorama, Died on 1 August in Cologne. Eulogy at the Cemetery (Panorama-Gründer Gert von Paczensky am 1. August in Köln gestorben. Dankes- und Abschiedsrede auf dem Friedhof). Neue Rheinische Zeitung, 7 August 2014
- Bridges of Empathy. Advocating Documentary Film on Television (Brücken der Empathie. Plädoyer für den Dokumentarfilm im Fernsehen), given at the award ceremony for the One World Film Award NRW (Eine-Welt-Filmpreis NRW) of the State Government of North Rhine-Westphalia, Cologne 2015
