= Klaus Bender =

German journalist (born 1938)

Klaus W. Bender
- Born: 1938 (age 87–88)
- Occupations: Author, Journalist
- Known for: Moneymakers: The Secret World of Banknote Printing

Klaus W. Bender (born 1938) is a German financial journalist and author, best known for writing the book Moneymakers: The Secret World of Banknote Printing.

== Early life ==
He was born in 1938 in Darmstadt, county of Hesse. Bender studied economics at LMU Munich and, later, at University of Cologne, financing his entire studies by working as a factory hand and office clerk. After graduation in 1964, with an MA in business administration, he immediately joined the research institute of the Friedrich-Ebert-Stiftung (FESt), one of the largest German political foundations, which in 1966 dispatched him to its newly opened regional office in Tokyo, Japan.

== Career ==
=== Germany ===
In 1970, Bender left FESt in order to become a journalist, a move he had planned for a long time. Initially, he reported from Tokyo on Japanese economic affairs as a freelance journalist for about 20 German and Swiss newspapers but soon was hired by Der Spiegel, Germany's most prominent weekly magazine, and simultaneously by Handelsblatt, one of Germany's leading economic dailies, as a freelance (economic) writer with a fixed retainer fee. In 1972, upon invitation from the board of publishers, Bender joined Frankfurter Allgemeine Zeitung (FAZ), Germany's leading daily (conservative) paper. He now reported on an exclusive basis for FAZ on politics, economics, and culture in the Asian region. Assignments by FAZ sent him to all countries of East and Southeast Asia, except for war-torn Indochina. Highlights were trips to mainland China (repeatedly), to North Korea, and to the Soviet Far East. All at that time were regions still closed to visitors from the West.

=== Italy ===
After 14 years in Japan, Bender in 1980 asked for a transfer back to Europe. He was reassigned as economics correspondent of FAZ in Rome, covering Italy and selected countries around the Mediterranean Basin. Although Bender considered the years passed in Italy as particularly happy and enriching, the fall of the Wall in Berlin induced him to ask in 1992, for a transfer to Eastern Europe. As economics correspondent of FAZ for Eastern and Southeastern Europe, he now accompanied the countries in the Prague-Bucharest-Belgrade triangle on their painful road of transition from Soviet oppression to a free market system and parliamentary democracy.

=== Misprint of euro ===
In the year 2000 Bender asked to be relieved of his duties as a full-time reporter in order to have more time for writing a non-fiction book about the arcane international high security printing industry that prints our banknotes, passports, and credit cards. However, he remained affiliated with FAZ as a reporter for specialized topics. In view of the upcoming common European currency, Bender as early as 1996 had started collecting material for a book on this subject even though frequent travelling for his newspaper made this additional task very difficult. As one result of this research, Bender in 2000, broke in FAZ the story of the misprint of more than 300 million pieces of 100-euro banknotes by Germany's high security printer Giesecke & Devrient. Bender's story went around the world, forcing the Munich-based company to recall the affected banknotes from the European Central Bank, and adding the missing security feature at an estimated additional cost of 15 million euro. Later it was Bender, who with several pieces published by FAZ, for the first time publicly denounced the shocking events surrounding the privatization of Bundesdruckerei, Berlin. This highly reputed German state banknote printer, because of the greed and incompetence of the people involved in the privatization process, was brought to the brink of collapse. It was one of the biggest economic scandals in post-war Germany.

== Published book ==
In 2004, Bender published the result of many years of research in German language in his book Geldmacher, das geheimste Gewerbe der Welt, published by Wiley-VCH, Weinheim (Germany). This first book published worldwide on the extremely secretive high security printing industry was applauded even by the sensitive industry itself, and was on the list of bestsellers (economics) in Germany, Austria, and Switzerland. In 2006, Bender published an up-dated version in English titled Moneymakers: The Secret World of Banknote Printing, again with Wiley-VCH. In this English version, based on technical facts, Bender, for the first time presented the massive doubts harboured by the high security printing industry and European police forces concerning the American accusations that North Korea is counterfeiting US 50- and 100-dollar bills on a large scale. These counterfeits called "supernotes" are of such high quality that even seasoned experts of banknote printing cannot distinguish them from a genuine note. More detailed information on this extremely touchy issue, obtained by Bender after the English version had gone to print, was published in two separate articles in FAZ (February 2006, January 2007), and in the Swiss paper Neue Zürcher Zeitung (February 2007). In these articles Bender also alleges that "supernotes" are actually produced by CIA in a facility near Washington D.C.
