= Charlotte Hohmann =

Magazine editor

Charlotte Hohmann (born Charlotte Scheffel: 19 May 1900 – 8 December 1971) was the first editor in chief of Die Frau von heute, the mass circulation weekly women's magazine founded in 1946 in Germany's Soviet occupation zone, into which, after 1949, rival publications were absorbed. As a young woman she was a political activist (KPD). Unlike her brother, she survived the Nazi years, but she nevertheless underwent several Gestapo interrogation sessions. During the early 1950s she held various senior positions within the East German print media sector even, at least on paper, after her retirement in 1955.

== Life ==
Charlotte Scheffel was born in Gera, an industrial city to the west of Dresden with a large textiles sector, in which her mother worked as a "seamstress" ("Näherin"). Her father was a painter. Scheffel left school in 1914 and embarked on a two-year traineeship in clothes manufacturing. Between 1917 and 1919 she worked as a clerical assistant in the city hall. From 1919 till 1921 she was employed in domestic service before moving on to a clerical position with the Gera Potash Syndicate. She lost that job in 1923 because of "Communist activities".

She joined the Young Communists in 1922 and the Communist Party itself in 1924. In 1926 she married Paul Hohmann, a Communist Party official. She herself was employed as a secretary with the Sicla Building Co-operative in 1924/25. Between 1925 and 1930 she worked as chief secretary with the Schraps architectural practice, work which she combined with similar functions at the East Thuringia Building Business ("Bauhüttenbetrieb Ostthüringen") in Gera. She was also, by this time, contributing written material to labour movement publications.

The Hohmanns relocated to Berlin in 1931. Hohmann embarked on a training at the Communist Party's national academy ("Reichsparteischule") in Berlin-Fichtenau (which had itself relocated from Dresden to Fichtenau in 1929). Next she became a senior official in the Women's Department of the Communist Party Central Committee. Between the end of 1931 and 1933 she was a volunteer and contributor to the newspaper for women, "Die Kämpferin" (published by the party's Red Star publishing house).

The Nazi power seizure in January 1933 was followed by a rapid switch to one-party dictatorship which put an end to Communist Party institutions in Germany and led to the imprisonment or forced emigration of the party leadership, although "underground activism" continued. Between 1933 and 1935 Charlotte Hohmann worked in a private dairy-delicatessen, while her apartment was used as an organisation hub for illegal Communist resistance fighters and couriers. Sources are vague on the details, which involved illegal "printing and postal" activities and accommodation for illegal party activists.

Her husband was arrested in May 1933 after which Charlotte continued to work in illegal resistance, involved with the Saefkows, Werner Seelenbinder and the grouping around Felix Tucholla and her own brother, Rudolf Scheffel. Meanwhile, from 1936 she was employed as an office worker with "Wirtschaftsgruppe Elektro-Industrie", an industrial conglomerate, dismissed in 1942 on grounds of ill health. Between 1942 and 1945 she is described as a housewife. Her brother Rudolf was arrested in August 1942 and executed in September 1943. Between 1933 and 1944 she was several times interrogated by the Gestapo.

War ended in May 1945 after which a large part of Germany surrounding Berlin was administered as the Soviet occupation zone (to be relaunched in 1949 as the Soviet sponsored German Democratic Republic (East Germany)). Between May and November 1945 Charlotte Hohmann worked for the city council in a management position in the Finance Department in Berlin-Schöneberg. In February 1946 the local women's committee launched the weekly magazine "Die Frau von heute" ("Today's Woman"): Charlotte Hohmann was listed as Managing Editor. During 1948 control of the magazine passed to the newly established Democratic Women's League ("Demokratischer Frauenbund Deutschlands" / DFD). She continued to be identified as "Chefredakteurin" ("Editor in Chief") till 1957, although other job appointments indicate that in reality her day to day involvement with this publication may have diminished after 1948. Between 1948 and 1950 Hohmann worked as deputy managing editor of the weekly women's magazine "Für Dich" (For Thee), under the editorship of Willi Karsch. ("Für Dich" was subsumed into "Die Frau von heute" in 1950, although it re-appeared as a standalone title in 1963.) Between 1950 and 1955 Hohmann was employed in a senior management position ("Hauptgeschäftsfuehrerin") with the National Union of Journalists. She retired in 1955 but continued to undertake unpaid work for The Party.

Charlotte Hohmann received her Medal for Fighters Against Fascism in 1958. She died in Berlin on 8 December 1971.
