= Martin Lejeune =

German activist

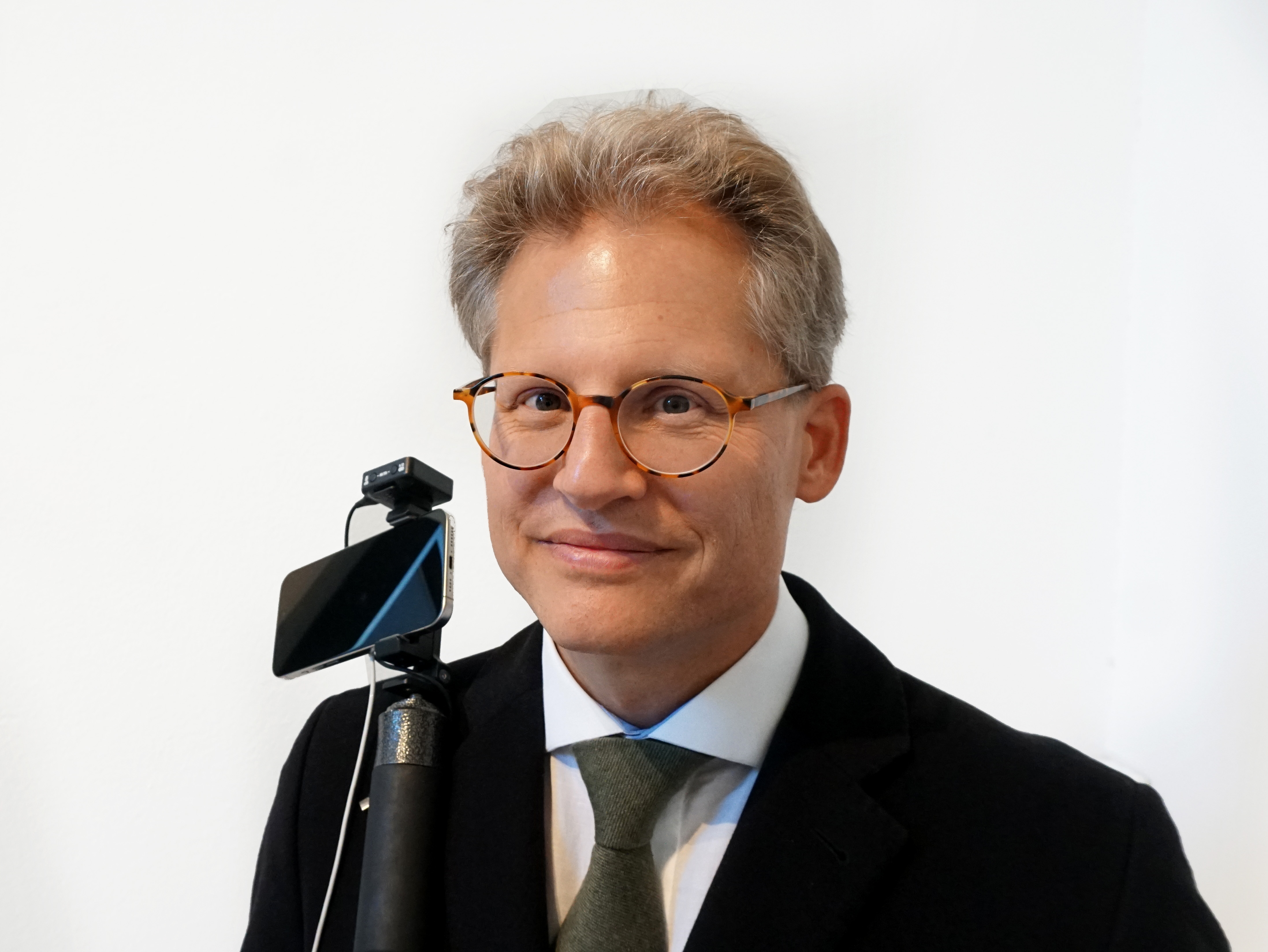
Martin Lejeune (2024)

Martin Lejeune (born 27 July 1980 in Hanover) is a German journalist. Lejeune spent his childhood and youth in Nuremberg and Bielefeld. He passed the Abitur through a Second Chance School (CEE). Starting in 2004, he read for a degree in political science from Otto-Suhr-Institut of the Free University of Berlin.

He has attracted controversy due to his criticisms of Israel, his involvement in the Toilettenaffäre and the controversy surrounding journalist accreditation at the NSU trial and for his reporting on the Syrian Civil War. He covered the 2014 Israel–Gaza conflict remotely.
