= Wilhelm Ulbrich =

Wilhelm Ulbrich (10 September 1846 – 16 October 1922) was a German journalist and regional poet of Thuringia.

== Biography ==
Ulbrich was born in an old-established porcelain maker's family in Lichte (Wallendorf). At the age of 14 he acquired the profession of a porcelain modeler. However, writing of poetry, songs, legends and fairy tales became a great passion with him.

== Lifework ==
Amongst his passion to the poetic art Wilhelm Ulbrich was

- Standing correspondent of the regional journal Schwarzburgbote
- Chairmen of the south Thuringian gymnastics organisation
- 1884 regional representative and honorary member of the XIII. German gymnastics region (Thuringia)
- Honorary member of numerous societies and organisations

== Publication ==
- 1878 Volume 1, poetry, songs, legends and fairy-tales from the Thuringian forest, printed by Ad. Riese in Saalfeld
- 1902 Volume 2, popular poetry, publishing house of the princely private court printing-office

== Honours ==
- Medal for Distinguished Service in gold, awarded by the Prince of Reuss (younger dynasty house)
- Medal of Honour in gold, awarded by the Prince Prince Günter of Schwarzburg

== Sources ==
- L. Pfeifer, "Wilhelm Ulbrich, ein Volksmann des Waldes", Schwarzburgbote 29 August 1926, at Universal Media Electronic Library, University of Jena (in German)
