= Traude Bührmann =

German translator and journalist (born 1926)

Traude Bührmann (born 26 November 1942, in Essen) is a German writer, screenwriter, photographer and translator. Known for her work in the genre of children's literature, as well as her contributions to various German TV programs and films.

== Biography ==
After high school, Bührmann made a commercial apprenticeship and a two-year stay in London and Paris After that, she became a foreign correspondent for local journals. In the early 1970s, she spent several years in Nepal and India and publishes photo and experience reports. Back in Germany, from 1973 to 1977, she completed her sociology studies in Berlin. From 1976 to 1979, she served as editor of the feminist magazine Courage: Berliner Frauenzeitung and other international journals. She also worked as a freelance journalist, writer and photographer and wrote texts and made image contributions for documentaries and anthologies.

In 1984, Bührmann co-founded the West Berlin Lesben.Kultur.Etage Araquin.

Her first novel, Flüge über Moabiter Mauern, was published in 1987. In 1989, she translated, among other novels, Nicole Brossard's Le Désert mauve. In folds way – lesbians and Age, published in 2000 by Verlag Krug & Damage mountain, Traude Bührmann portrays lesbians and age / n

In 1989, she spent a year in Montreal and participated from 1988 to 1994 in lectures at the International Feminist Book Fair in Montreal, Barcelona, Amsterdam and Melbourne. In the Berlin meeting place for artists PELZE-multimedia, she organizes interdisciplinary projects. She is a co-organizer of the European photo exhibition Lesbian Connexions, which were shown at the Gay Games in Amsterdam for the first time in 1998.

Between 2002 and 2005, Bührmann organized and conducted literary salons and writing workshops for the EFAK (European Women's Academy of Arts and Sciences (EFAK) and works in cultural centers, district and educational facilities.

She also runs historical tours for women in Paris and Berlin.
