= Susanne Stichler =

German journalist and newscaster (born 1969)

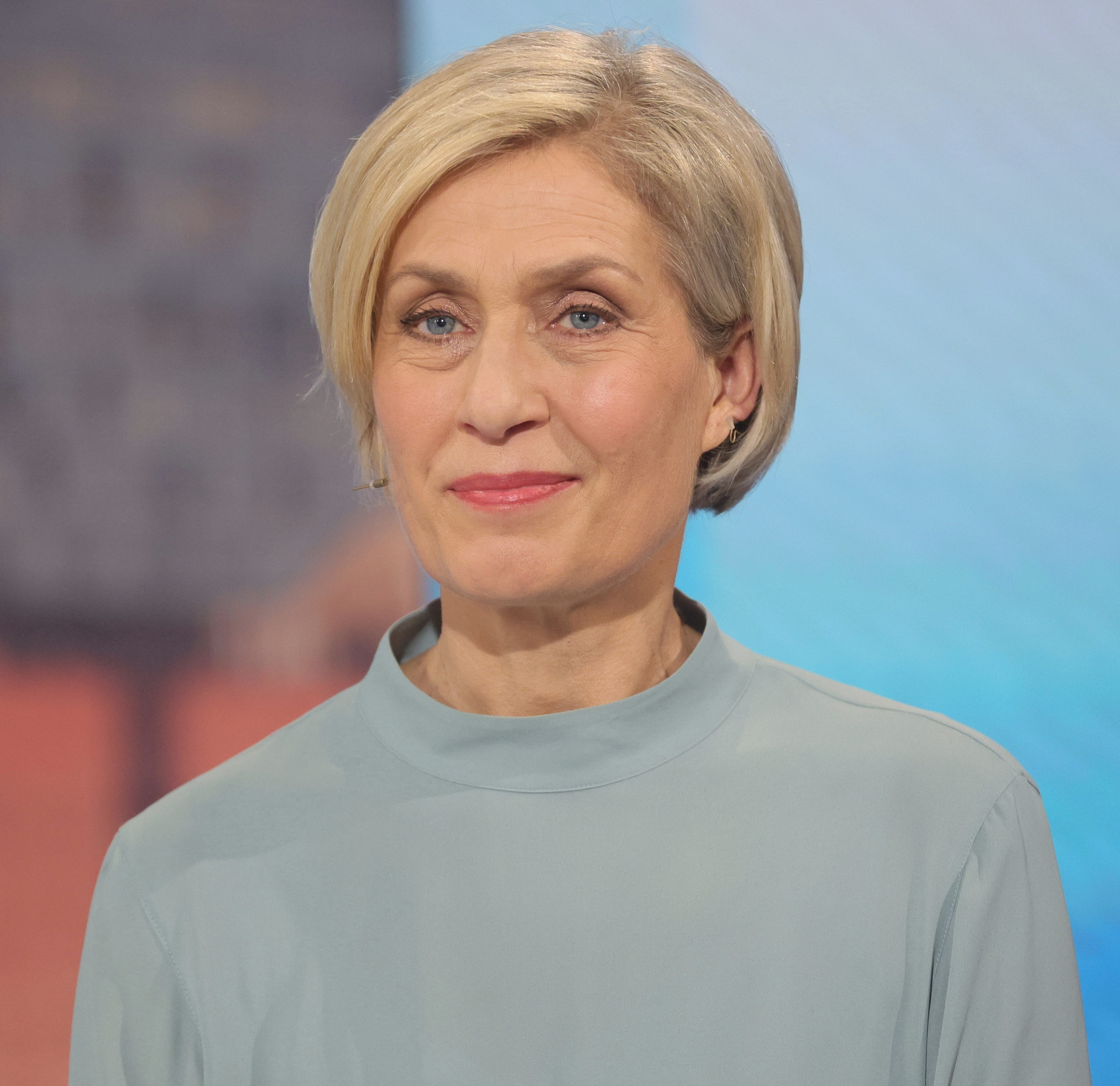
Stichler in 2025

Susanne Stichler (born 17 August 1969 in Karlsruhe, Baden-Württemberg) is a German journalist and newscaster.

== Life ==
She studied educational science at the University of Tübingen and worked as a trainee for a local radio station "Neckar-Alb Radio" in Reutlingen from 1991 to 1993.

She went to Potsdam to "Fritz", a youth radio station, and then the public broadcaster for Brandenburg, ORB. Stichler then worked for the TV section of the public broadcaster for Hessen, Hessischer Rundfunk, in Frankfurt, from 1997 to 1999. From 1999, she hosted several magazines for the national broadcaster ZDF. Since 2004, she has been working for NDR. Her most prominent show there is Germany's most watched evening newscast, Tagesschau, for national broadcaster ARD.

Stichler lives in Hamburg with her son Paul.
