= Anna Sauerbrey =

German journalist

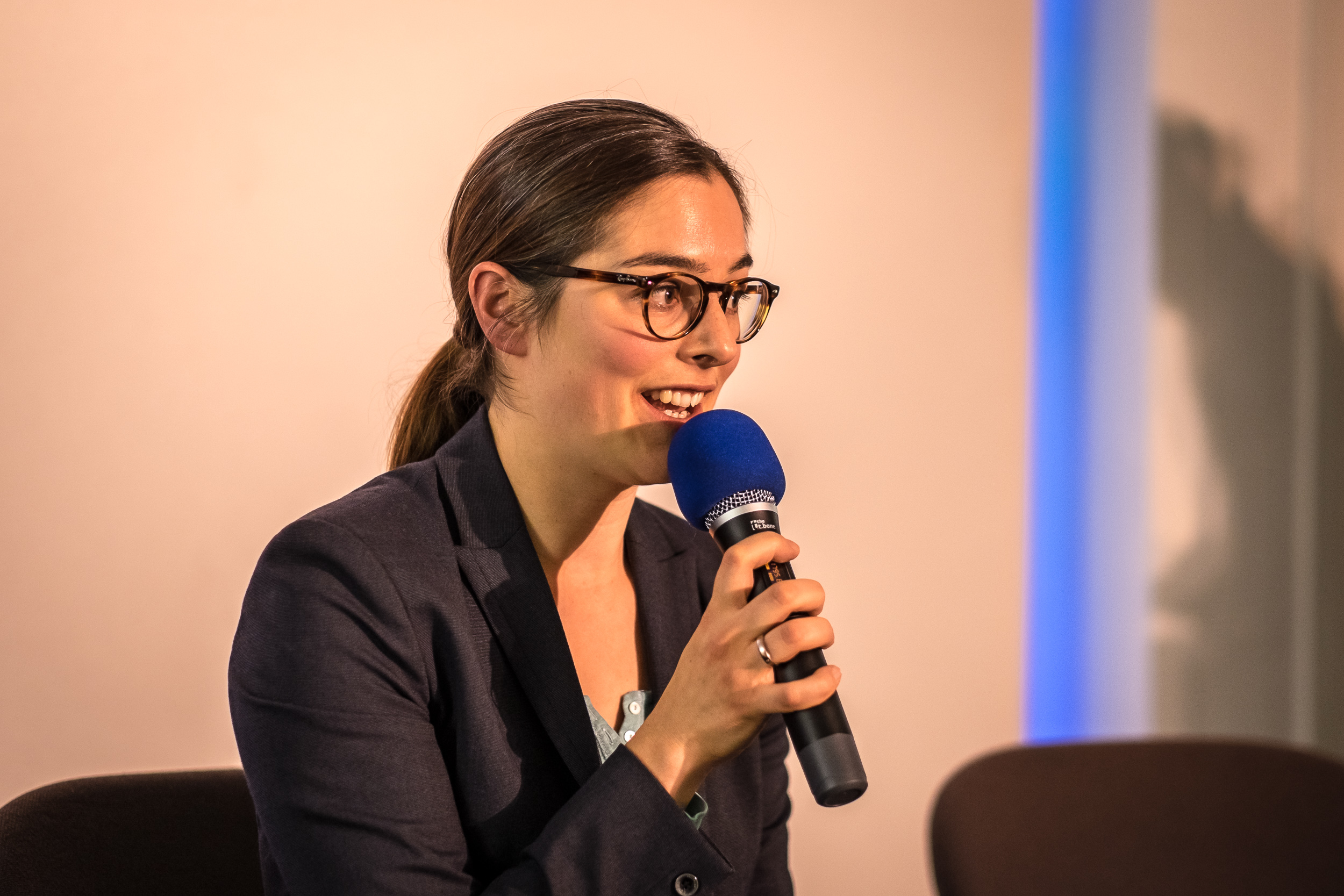
- Sauerbrey in 2014
- Born: 1979 (age 46–47); Essen, North Rhine-Westphalia, West Germany

Anna Sauerbrey (born 1979) is a German journalist and a member of the editorial board of Der Tagesspiegel.

== Career ==
Sauerbrey studied medieval and modern history, political science, and journalism in Mainz and Bordeaux. From 2005 to 2009, she was a research assistant at the Department of History of the University of Mainz. She received her doctorate with a dissertation on The Strasbourg Monasteries in the 16th Century. Sauerbrey was a guest editor at the newspaper Frankfurter Allgemeine Zeitung and the broadcaster ZDF, and worked for several years as a freelancer for Rhein-Zeitung, a regional newspaper. Sauerbrey completed a traineeship at the Tagesspiegel in 2009, and became a member of its opinion editorial staff in 2011. In 2013, she was an Arthur F. Burns Fellow at The Philadelphia Inquirer. She writes a monthly column on Germany for The New York Times. Sauerbrey heads the opinion section of the Tagesspiegel and has been a member of the Tagesspiegel's editorial board since 2018.

In 2019, Sauerbrey was a member of the jury for the Axel Springer Prize.
