= Renate Schostack =

Renate Schostack (10 January 1938 in Pforzheim – 28 July 2016 in Munich) was a German journalist and writer.

== Life ==
Renate Schostack studied German studies and history at universities in Munich, Basel, Paris and Berlin. In 1964, she was awarded a doctorate in philosophy in Freiburg im Breisgau with a thesis on Wieland and Lavater. She then worked as a lecturer at the universities in Toulouse and Bristol. From 1969 to 2003, she worked in the feature section of the Frankfurter Allgemeine Zeitung, from 1971 to 1974 as cultural correspondent in London, from 1985 in Munich.

In addition to journalism and literary criticism, she has written novels and short stories. She wrote novels and short stories, most of which portrayed couple relationships from a female perspective.

After her retirement Schostack lived in Pforzheim again. She died in Munich in July 2016 at the age of 78.

== Honours and awards ==
Renate Schostack received a scholarship from the Klagenfurt jury in 1977, the "Jury Prize" at the Ingeborg Bachmann Competition in Klagenfurt in 1984 and the Prize for Science Journalism from the German English Writers' Association in 1989. In 2003 she was honoured for her commitment with the Freundeszeichen of the Katholische Akademie in Bayern.

== Publications (selection) ==
- Wieland und Lavater, Beiträge zur Geistesgeschichte des ausgehenden 18. Jahrhunderts, Freiburg im Breisgau 1964, DNB-IDN 482347945 (Dissertation University of Freiburg im Breisgau, Faculty of Philosophy, 31 July 1964, 176 pages).
- Zwei Arten zu lieben, Munich [et al.] 1977
- Hände weg von meinem Regenbogen, Munich [et al. a.] 1979
- Heiratsversuche oder Die Einschiffung nach Cythera, Munich [et al.] 1985
- Niedere Gangarten, Zurich 1991
- Wer liebt, hat recht, Zurich 1994
- Hinter Wahnfrieds Mauern. Gertrud Wagner – ein Leben, Hamburg 1998
- Palmeselkönig, Kieselbronn 1998
- Wintertage in Sankt Petersburg, Kieselbronn 2003
- Die eitle Schöne: über Geist und Kultur in München, Sankt-Michaelsbund, Munich 2008, ISBN 978-3-939905-20-2.
- 1501 oder Die der der Pest abgewandte Seite der Stadt. Eine historische Phantasie (theatre play), Pforzheim 2016, ISBN 978-3-926006-16-5
- Fräulein Ava Laurin (novel, newspaper preprint 2016)

== Quotes ==
Don't chase after me, don't try to save me, don't bring me back. For as much comfort as I would need, no man on earth has to give

— "The Embarkation to Cythera", Marriage Attempts or The Embarkation to Cythera
