= Ashwin Raman =

- Born: 18 June 1946 (age 80); Bombay
- Occupations: journalist, documentary filmmaker

Ashwin Raman (born 18 June 1946) is a German journalist and documentary filmmaker of Indian descent. Raman is notable for a number of prize-winning documentaries which have garnered him the Grimme Prize (2017), the Robert Geisendörfer Prize (2012), Otto Brenner Special Award, the international CNN Rory Peck Award and the Deutscher Fernsehpreis, among others.

== Early life ==
Raman's father was the editor-in-chief of The Times of India (Ahmedabad edition) and his mother a teacher. After completing his bachelor's degree in literature in India, he received a scholarship for a master's degree at the University of Oxford. At the 1972 Summer Olympics in Munich he worked as a host and made his first contacts with Germany during this time. After his Master's degree he returned to India and started working as a reporter for The Times of India.

At this time, India's political situation was extremely unstable owing to Indira Gandhi's state of emergency. Raman was imprisoned for evading censorship with an underground newspaper. Amnesty International in Hamburg took up his case and were able to aid him to migrate to Germany.

== Life in Germany ==
In Hamburg he began writing for Der Spiegel and Die Zeit, although his texts initially had to be translated. He worked for Amnesty in Los Angeles for some time, wrote for the Los Angeles Times and then traveled to Nicaragua as a freelance journalist, where he reported on the civil war there for various newspapers. There he also made his first documentary film With the Sandinistas (1978), which he shot in 16 mm format and sold to various television stations. After the end of the civil war in 1979, he moved back to Germany and took German citizenship in 1985.

From the 1980s Raman devoted himself increasingly to documentary film, acquiring the necessary knowledge autodidactically. To date Raman has made over 200 documentaries as a "one-man team". Since the 2000s he has concentrated primarily on war and crisis reporting for public broadcasting, traveling to Afghanistan, Somalia, Iraq, Syria, and other countries. In 2019, he announced that he would be withdrawing from war reporting because he was "tired of war" and suffering from health problems.

Raman lives in Selm in North Rhine-Westphalia. He is married and has two sons.
