= Albrecht von Croÿ =

German journalist (born 1959)

Albrecht von Croÿ (born 1959 in Mülheim an der Ruhr, North Rhine-Westphalia) is a German and journalist. He is a former managing editor of the Handelsblatt.

He worked for the Frankfurter Allgemeine Zeitung from 1989 until he became one of the founders of the TELEBÖRSE in 1999. In 2002 he was appointed to a position at the DMEuro in Frankfurt, a newspaper owned by the Verlagsgruppe Handelsblatt.
