= Ute Scheub =

German journalist and author

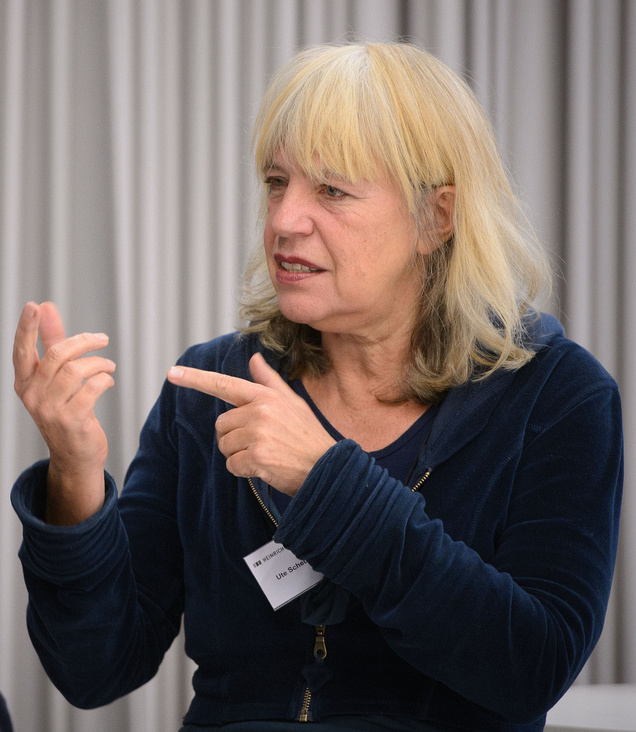
2015

Ute Scheub is a German journalist-commentator, political analyst and author. A woman of robust intellect and powerful convictions, she is also sometimes identified as a campaigner.

== Life ==
Ute Scheub was born and grew up at Tübingen, a long-established university town in south-west Germany. She was the youngest of her parents’ four recorded children, and the only girl among them. Her father was a pharmacist who, when she was 13 and he was 56, committed suicide at a church assembly meeting of approximately 2,000 people. The experience has marked her life.

Scheub was a musically gifted child, passing a Level C exam (‘C-Prüfung’) as a church organist, a qualification generally awarded only after two or three years of successful study.

She passed her "Abitur" (school final exams) in 1974, which opened the way for university-level education, and enrolled at the U.S.-backed Free University of Berlin (FUB) to study Political sciences, Germanistics and Media sciences. In Berlin she recalls being told that her regional Schwabian accent was ugly, an opinion which she has cheerfully endorsed. She emerged in 1980 from the FUB's specialist Otto Suhr Institute a degree in political sciences. Thirty years later, in 2010, she received her doctorate which was also in the Political sciences. Her doctoral dissertation, published (and widely discussed) under the one-word title "Heldendämmerung" in 2010, (Note: There is, however, a subtitle: “Die Krise der Männer und warum sie auch für Frauen gefährlich ist” (‘’”The crisis of masculinity, and why it is also dangerous for women”’’)) concerned "Toxic Masculinity", a theme to which she regularly returns, in response to the unfolding news agenda, in her powerful newspaper commentaries. Ute Scheub has continued to make her home in Berlin.

== "Manfred Augst" ==
The circumstances under which Scheub learned of her father's past as a member of the government's elite paramititary "Schutzstaffel" (SS) organisation were exceptional. It was an unusually hot day and Scheub herself had gone swimming at the open-air public pool: she would learn from her mother of her father's death only that evening. Meanwhile, in Stuttgart participants at the 1969 German Evangelical Church Assembly had finished listening to a reading from an as yet unpublished new work by the author, the widely respected Günter Grass: a man in his mid-fifties stood up in front of one of the many microphones recently installed in the basement lecture theatre, and launched himself into a short speech reported at the time as "muddled and incomprehensible". His final flourish was the utterance "I send greetings to my SS comrades!" (‘’" Ich provoziere jetzt und grüße meine Kameraden von der SS!"’’). The speaker then put a small bottle to his lips and swallowed the contents. The little bottle contained potassium cyanide and the man committing suicide in front of an audience of 2,.000 people was Ute Scheub's father. He died on the way to the hospital. The unassuming and physically puny man had never been a leading figure in the elite SS, but he had been passionately committed to it, and to the wider Hitler project, with all its well reported horrors. From his final words, and from the further researches which the event triggered, it became clear that the suicide of the man identified in reports of his death as "Manfred Augst" was driven not by any acknowledged sense of shame, but by bitter disappointment at the crushing of the National Socialist vision.

Naturally Grass, who was already well known as a writer with an insatiable interest and in the long shadow cast by the Hitler years over the sociological and psychological development of post-war Germany, went on to write about the suicide. It was Grass who invented and applied the pseudonym "Manfred Augst" when he referenced the incident in his 1972 political record "Aus dem Tagebuch einer Schnecke" ("From the diary of a snail"). Grass had intended that "Manfred Augst" should merit only the briefest of mentions in this one book, but in the end he could not resist investigating further, undertaking a visit to the family home where he sat round the table with the widow in the four orphaned children of the man whom he had been sitting next to when he had identified, correctly, that the bottle from which the man drank contained cyanide. While her brothers joined in the discussion the daughter, according to her later recollection, had sat in silence, awed by the presence and intellect of one of West Germany's most iconic writers. But she would remember. Decades later. when she had digested the event and its aftermath, and then worked her way through her father's many surviving papers and effects, Ute Scheub would herself write about her father's record. He was, she would write 35 years after he killed himself, "a 150% Nazi" (‘""Er war ein hundertfünfzigprozentiger Nazi"‘‘). Scheub, in her own writing, continued to identify her father with the pseudonym that Grass had concocted for him. Both Grass and (since 2006) Scheub have returned repeatedly to the themes involving the life and death of “Manfred Augst". Scheub's most complete and fully considered account, which appeared in 2006, is her book "Das falsche Leben".

== Journalist ==
Even before graduating from university, Ute Scheub was a co-founder in 1978 of the Tageszeitung ("taz"), a new daily newspaper published initially in Berlin, but which soon acquired a nationwide readership. The paper had an unusual co-operatively based ownership structure which meant that the views expressed and endorsed were those of the journalists rather than of a proprietor. The political alignment was generally that of the liberal-minded centre-left. In that sense, it was attractive to the generation of ‘68 as they moved into positions of influence: Ute Scheub was still barely old enough to be considered one them, however. Her linguistic force and fluency nevertheless quickly gained her a following, and the “taz” became a valuable platform for her views. Her first journalistic commitment was to the ecological movement which at that time was viewed by the political mainstream as an ignorably niche development that would soon be replaced by something else. The powerful anti-nuclear lobby was another early beneficiary of her support. For Scheub journalistic objectivity was not an option. A neutral approach was at best cowardly and probably dishonest. She wanted to be powerfully partisan, backing the ideas of the future in order to help them break through more effectively. For the youthful Ute Scheub, journalism was an unapologetically utopian career choice. Although her approach has become visibly more thoughtful and the intellectual analysis even more rigorous, in the eyes of admirers the underlying dynamic of her journalism has not changed in the decades that have followed. Having made her mark at „taz“ as West Germany's first “Environmental Editor” she moved on to the paper's news desk, and then to regional editorial responsibilities for Hamburg and Berlin. Later she worked as the paper's “Women's Editor”. Having determined that this was “ein Scheißjob” (“a shitty job”) she quit. Ute Scheub retired from the editorial staff at the "taz" in 1996 but remained prolific in her journalism on a free-lance basis.

Other widely respected newspapers to which Scheub has contributed frequently over the years include Der Tagesspiegel, the Frankfurter Rundschau and the Süddeutsche Zeitung. She has more recently become increasingly associated with the weekly political post-reunification newspaper, Der Freitag.

In 1986 Scheub took a break from the „taz" to accept a position as press spokeswoman for the Hamburg "Green alternative list" parliamentary group. The job reflected both her own political inclinations and her reputation as one of West Germany's leading specialist journalist on environmental issues. The more immediate trigger was the radioactive cloud detected crossing into Europe from the east during the final days of April 1986, followed by rumours and (some days later) reports of the Chernobyl disaster. However, the appointment for Scheub was of relatively brief duration.

== Campaigner ==
- Scheub responded to the outbreak of the 1991 Gulf War by co-founding the pacifist organisation "Frauenaktion Scheherazade" which went on to undertake a number of support projects intended to help destitute women and children in Nimruz Province.
- In March 2003 she was moved by the launch that year of the Anglo-American Iraq War by co-founding in Germany the so-called "Frauensicherheitsrat" ("Women's Security Council"), a network of around 50 activists from political foundations, human rights associations, organisations committed to human development, peace movements and peace research institutions. The focus of activities was on campaigning and lobbying.
- In Autumn/Fall 2006 Scheub became a European co-ordinator for the world-wide "PeaceWomen Across the Globe" project.
- Since 2007 Scheub has been taking a lead in the Transition towns initiative, focusing on making urban development more socially and ecologically responsible.

== Recognition (selection) ==
- 1992 Ingeborg Drewitz Prize
- 1998 Revolution Prize from IG Medien (union) for taz special issue on 1848
- 2012 Alternative Media Prize First prize in the online category.

== Published output (selection) ==
- Krawalle und Liebe – Geschichte aus Berlin. Hamburg 1983. ISBN 978-3-499-15270-2
- Alte Bekannte – Den neuen Nazis und ihren geheimen Freunden auf der Spur. Hamburg 1985. ISBN 978-3-499-15507-9
- Zwischen Prunk und Stunk – eine kleine Hamburger Skandalchronik. Hamburg 1986. ISBN 978-3-925387-20-3
- Verrückt nach Leben – Berliner Szenen in den zwanziger Jahren. Hamburg 2000. ISBN 978-3-499-22679-3
- Friedenstreiberinnen – elf Mutmachgeschichten aus einer weltweiten Bewegung. Gießen 2004. ISBN 978-3-89806-931-1
- Das falsche Leben – eine Vatersuche. München 2006. ISBN 978-3-492-04839-2
- Heldendämmerung – die Krise der Männer und warum sie auch für Frauen gefährlich ist. München 2010. ISBN 978-3-570-55110-3
- mit Yvonne Kuschel: Beschiss-Atlas – Zahlen und Fakten zu Ungerechtigkeiten in Wirtschaft, Gesellschaft und Umwelt. München 2012. ISBN 978-3-453-28037-3
- mit Haiko Pieplow und Hans-Peter Schmidt: Terra Preta. Die schwarze Revolution aus dem Regenwald. Mit Klimagärtnern die Welt retten und gesunde Lebensmittel produzieren. 2013, ISBN 978-3-86581-407-4
- Ackergifte? Nein danke! Für eine enkeltaugliche Landwirtschaft. Akt 438. Klein Jasedow 2014, ISBN 978-3-927369-87-0
- mit Annette Jensen: Glücksökonomie. Wer teilt, hat mehr vom Leben. Oekom Verlag, München 2014. 320 S.
- mit Harald Schumann: Die Troika – Macht ohne Kontrolle: Eine griechische Tragödie und eine europäische Groteske in fünf Akten. 2015.
- mit Stefan Schwarzer: Die Humusrevolution, oekom-Verlag 2017, ISBN 978-3-86581-838-6
- Demokratie Die Unvollendete – Plädoyer für mehr Teilhabe (Ein Buch von: mehr-demokratie.de) 2017
- mit Christian Küttner: Abschied vom Größenwahn – Wie wir zu einem menschlichen Maß finden, oekom-Verlag 2020, ISBN 978-3-96238-205-6
- B.A.U.weisen – weise bauen, 40 Jahre B.A.U., dem Bund Architektur und Umwelt e.V., oekom-Verlag 2021, ISBN 978-3-96238-271-1
