= Alice Hasters =

German author and journalist (born 1989)

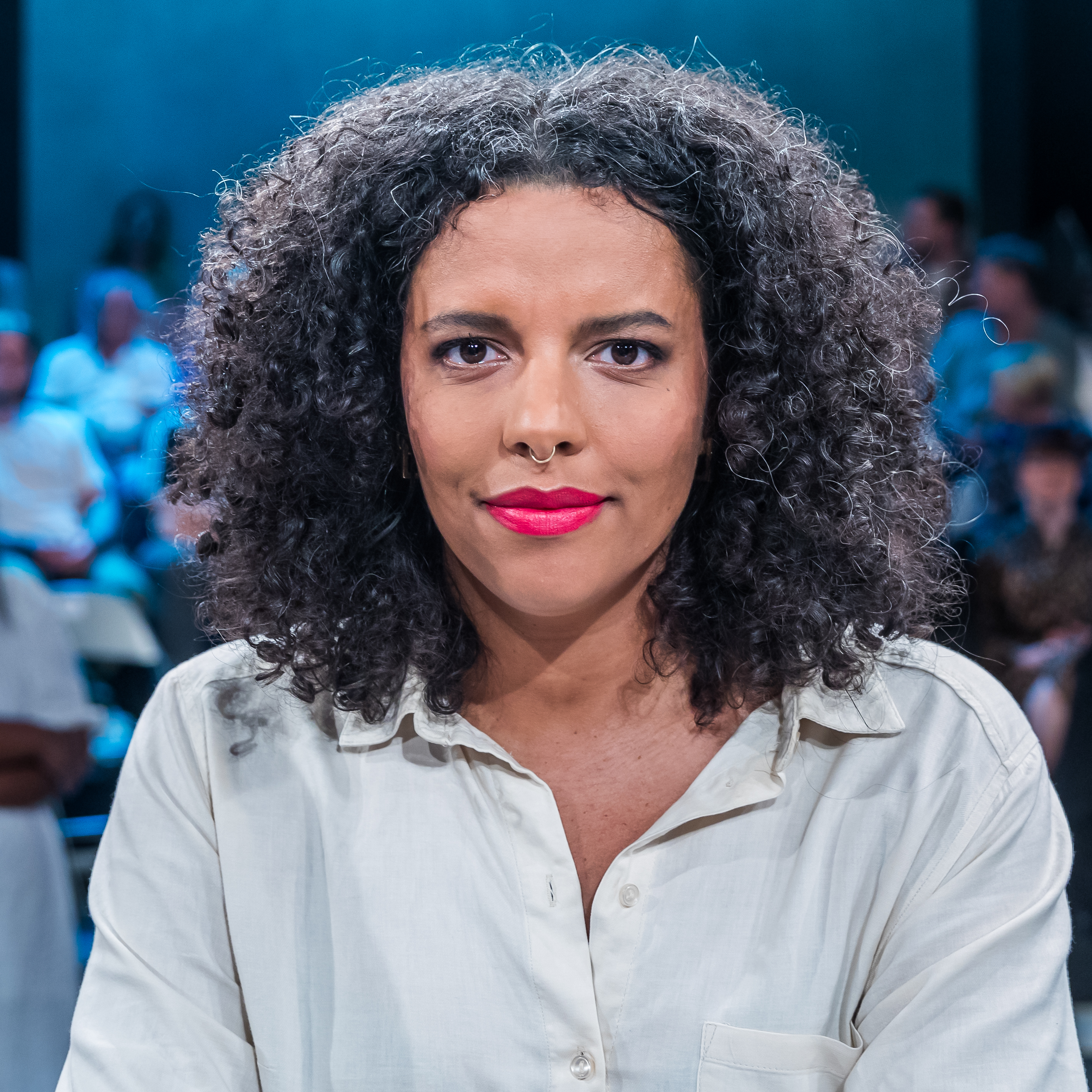
- Hasters in 2024
- Born: Alice Haruko Hasters; June 10, 1989 (age 37); Cologne, Germany
- Occupations: author; journalist; podcaster
- Awards: Bert-Donnepp-Preis (2023); Culture Journalist of the Year (2020)

Alice Haruko Hasters (born June 10, 1989) is a German journalist, author, and podcaster.

== Early life and education ==
Born in 1989 in Cologne, Germany, Hasters is the youngest of three daughters born to a Black American mother and a white German father. Hasters spent most of her childhood and youth in the Nippes district of Cologne. Her parents, both artists, raised their three children according to the Buddhist faith. In eleventh grade, Alice Hasters spent a year abroad at her uncle's home in North Philadelphia, Pennsylvania, and attended Central High School there.

After graduating from high school, Hasters first studied at the Cologne Sports University and later at the German School of Journalism in Munich.

== Career ==
Hasters refers to herself as a Black person (Schwarze in German), and she writes and publishes about Afro-German identity, racism, feminism and intersectionality. Her 2019 autobiographical debut book was What White People Don't Want to Hear about Racism but Should Know Anyway (in German, Was weiße Menschen nicht über Rassismus hören wollen, aber wissen sollten). In June 2020, the book reached number 3 on Der Spiegel magazine's bestseller list of paperback nonfiction books. It also reached number 5 on Der Spiegel's annual bestseller list of paperback nonfiction titles.

After graduating from college, Hasters worked for the national TV news program Tagesschau and for Germany's national broadcaster Rundfunk Berlin-Brandenburg (rbb). From January to March 2023, she was a Fellow of the Thomas Mann House in Los Angeles, working on a project about dance and racialization; it explored "dance as a resistance practice against white supremacist systems".

Since 2016, Hasters has been producing and publishing the Feuer & Brot (Fire & Bread) podcast with her friend and colleague Maximiliane Häcke. From 2020 to 2022, she moderated the podcast Einhundert – Stories with Alice Hasters, broadcast on Deutschlandfunk Nova.

Hasters has been vocal about what she sees as the social erasure and tokenization of Black Germans in mainstream German media and culture. In her work, she advocates for greater representation and inclusion of Black voices and perspectives in all areas of German society.

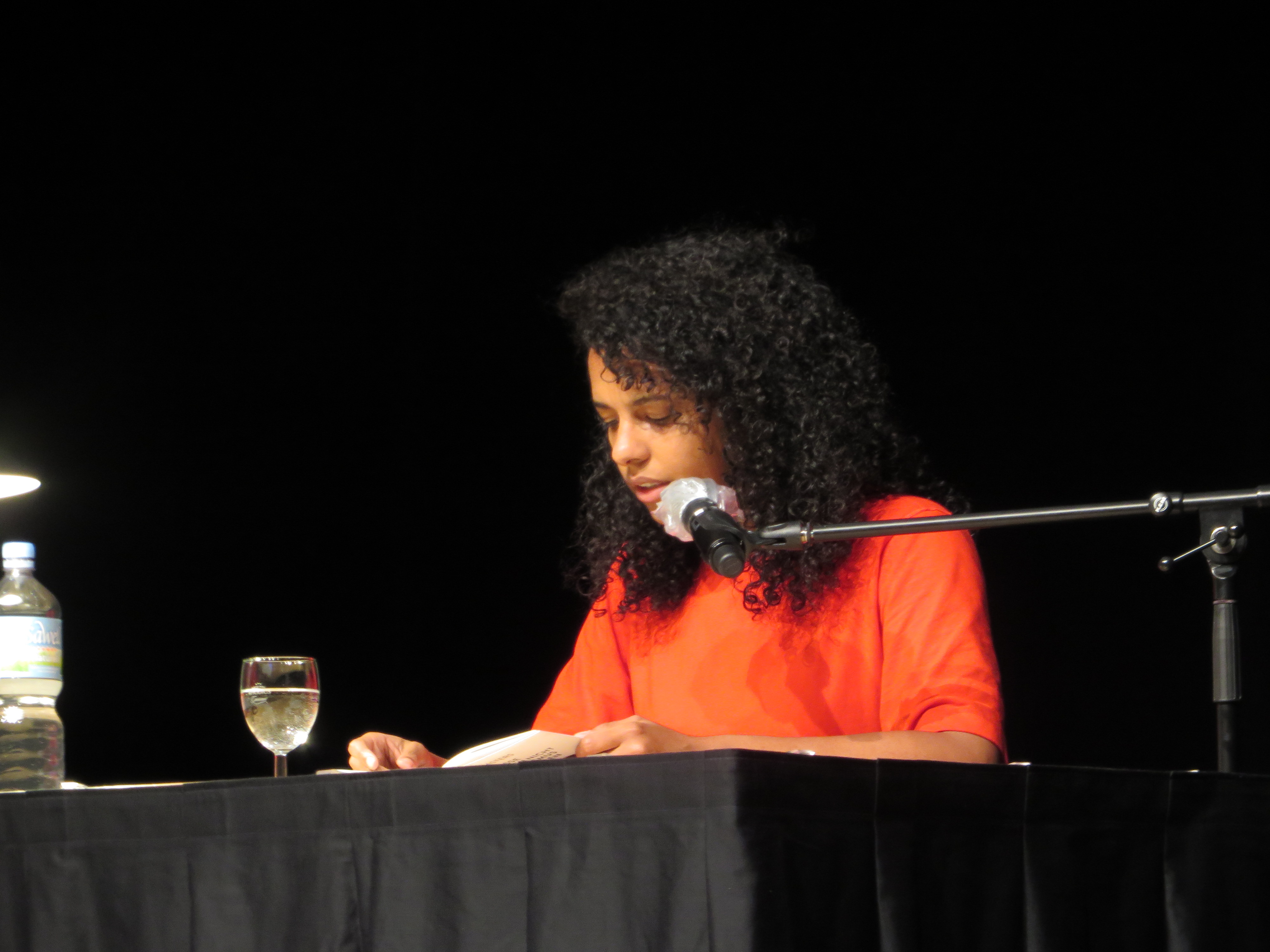
Alice Hasters at a book launch at the cultural centre Saalbau Witten in Witten, Germany (2020)

Hasters was named Culture Journalist of the Year 2020 by the German journal medium magazin. In 2023, she was awarded the Bert-Donnepp-Preis, a prestigious German media award dedicated to journalists who "engage critically with the social impact of media".

== Selected works ==
=== Books ===
- 2019: Was weiße Menschen nicht über Rassismus hören wollen, aber wissen sollten (What White People Don't Want to Hear about Racism but Should Know Anyway), Carl Hanser Verlag, Berlin, ISBN 978-3-446-26425-0.
- 2021: Who's Black? In: Schwarz wird großgeschrieben, &Töchter, München, ISBN 978-3-948819026.

=== Audiobooks ===
- 2020: Was weiße Menschen nicht über Rassismus hören wollen, aber wissen sollten (What White People Don't Want to Hear about Racism but Should Know Anyway) (audiobook, read by Alice Hasters), tacheles!/ROOF Music, ISBN 978-3864846731.
- 2021: Philipp Steffan: Sag was! Radikal höflich gegen Rechtspopulismus argumentieren (Say something! Radical Politeness in Arguing against Right-Wing Populism) (together with Maximiliane Häcke), Oetinger Audio/Audible, ISBN 978-3-8373-9004-9.

== Awards ==
- 2023: Bert-Donnepp-Preis
- 2020: Culture Journalist of the Year (medium magazin).
