= Annika Brockschmidt =

German journalist and author

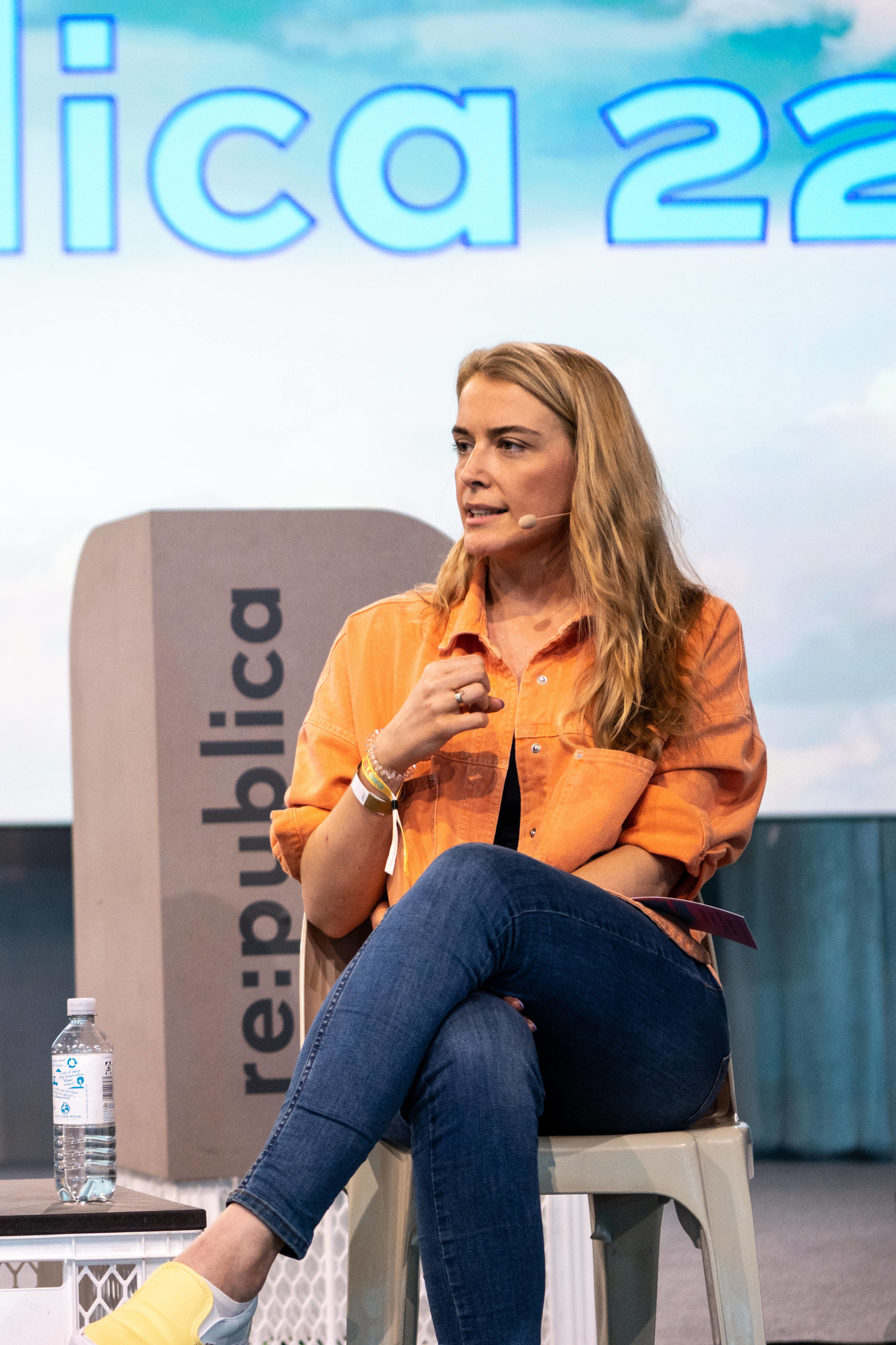
Brockschmidt at the 2022 re:publica conference

Annika Brockschmidt (born 24 August 1992 in Berlin) is a German journalist, author, and podcaster. She is best known in Germany for her writings since 2020 about the Christian right in the United States.

== Biography ==
Brockschmidt was born in Berlin and attended school at Canisius-Kolleg Berlin, and attended university at Heidelberg University where she studied history and German studies. She also did an Erasmus semester at Durham University in England. From 2017 to 2019 she completed her master's degree in War and Conflicts Studies at the University of Potsdam.

Brockschmidt has worked as a freelance journalist for a number of German outlets. From 2014 to 2017 she produced the science podcast Science Pie with physicist Dennis Schulz, which was posted in both English and German. In 2017, the two published the German book, targeted to young adult readers, Goethes Faust und Einsteins Haken. Der Kampf der Wissenschaften (Goethe's Fist and Einstein's Hook: The Battle of the Sciences).

== Writing on the American Christian Right ==
Her book Amerikas Gotteskrieger (America's Holy Warriors) (2021) about the rise of the Christian Right in the United States became a German bestseller. It received positive reviews, but an article in English in Politico Europe was critical of the fact that Brockschmidt had never visited the United States, and suggested Americans would consider the book an "obvious caricature", and was only popular because it fed German preconceptions of America. Brockschmidt replied that she was unable to visit America due to the COVID-19 pandemic and that her work was not one of direct reporting. The Politico critiques were widely rebutted in German media, and she is frequently called to comment on issues of the U.S. religious right in German news.

In 2022, Brockschmidt received a Transatlantic Media Fellowship from the Heinrich Böll Foundation for a research trip to the United States. Her next book, Die Brandstifter. Wie Extremisten die Republikanische Partei übernahmen (The Firestarters: How Extremists Took Over the Republican Party), was published in February 2024.

Her podcast Kreuz und Flagge (Cross and Flag) also focuses on America's religious right.
