= Thomas Satinsky =

German journalist and newspaper publisher (born 1963)

Thomas Satinsky (born 1963) is a German journalist and newspaper publisher.

Satinsky studied Politics and German Studies in Tübingen and completed a traineeship at the newspaper Heilbronner Simme. After working as editor for the same newspaper as well as contributing to the Stuttgart paper Sonntag Aktuell he became in 1998 editor-in-chief at the daily independent newspaper Pforzheimer Zeitung. Soon he was offered the position as editor-in-chief at Südkurier. In 2010 he returned to Pforzheimer Zeitung, where he currently holds the position as executive publisher.
