= Klaus Umbach =

German journalist (1936–2018)

- Born: 24 April 1936
- Died: 28 January 2018 (aged 81); Cologne, Germany
- Occupations: Journalist author
- Notable work: Der Spiegel

Klaus Umbach (24 April 1936 – 28 January 2018) was a German culture journalist, who became known through his trenchant articles and glosses in the magazine Der Spiegel, but also as an author of books.

== Life ==
Umbach studied law. He subsequently worked as an editor at EMI, also at Deutsche Welle.

From 1969 to 2007 he was music editor in the cultural section of the German news magazine Der Spiegel.

Umbach died in Cologne at age 81.

== Work ==
=== Books ===
- Klaus Umbach (edit.): Richard Wagner – ein deutsches Ärgernis. Rowohlt Verlag, Hamburg 1982, ISBN 3-499-33034-2.
- Klaus Umbach: Geldschein-Sonate. Das Millionenspiel mit der Klassik. Ullstein Verlag, Berlin 1990, ISBN 3-550-06450-0.
- Klaus Umbach: Celibidache, der andere Maestro. Piper Verlag, Munich 1995, ISBN 978-3-492-22553-3.

=== Musical theatre ===
- Klaus Umbach: Wahnfried Ein deutsches Stammlokal Die wunderbare Welt der Wagners. Ein kleines Gesamtkunstwerk. World premiere on 27 August 2006, Ruhrtriennale, staging: Markus Dietze.
