= Gerd Rubenbauer =

German sports commentator (born 1948)

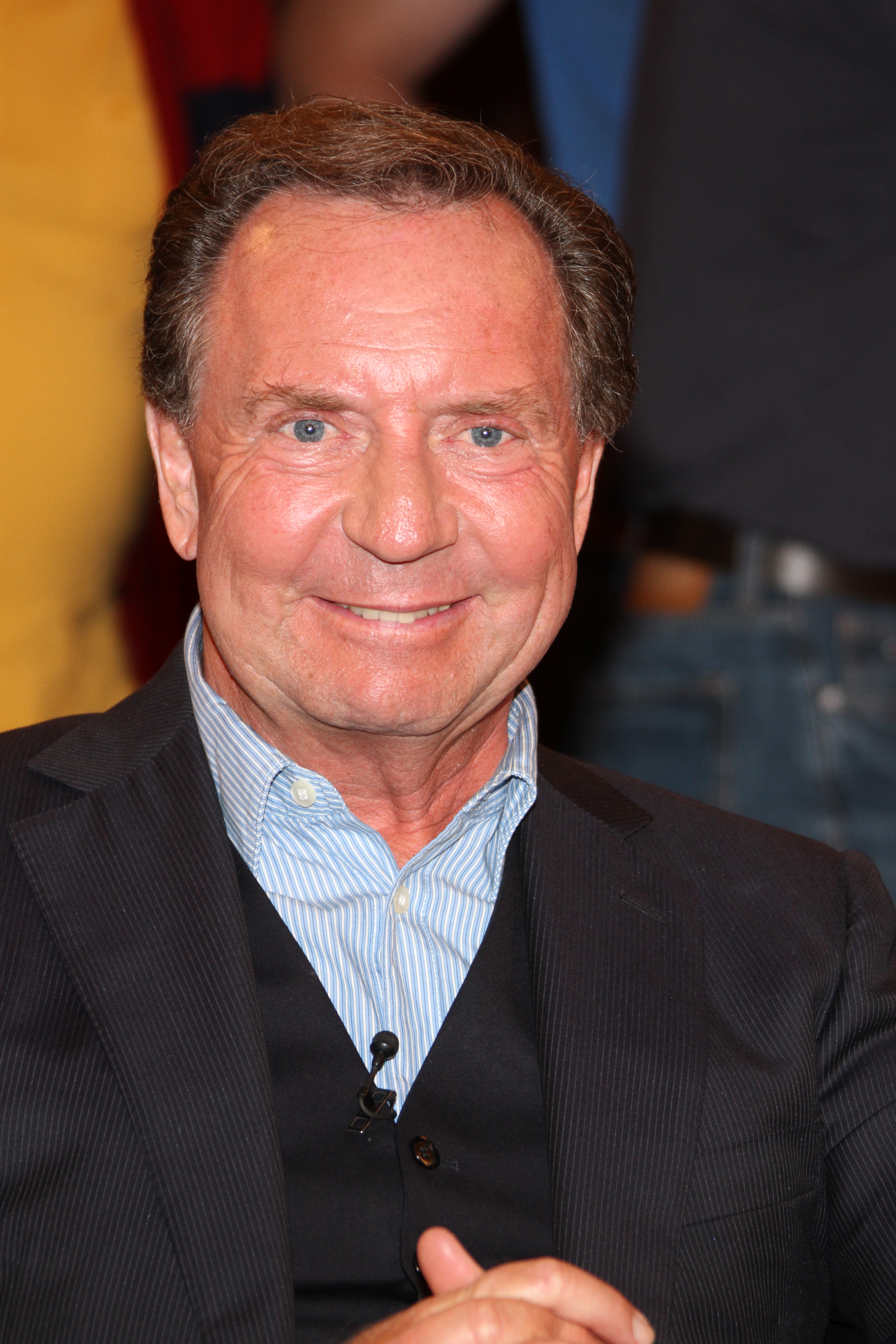
Gerd Rubenbauer, 2012

Gerd Rubenbauer (born 20 May 1948 in Munich) is a retired German sports commentator.

== Life ==
Rubenbauer worked for many years in German television as journalist for sport programs (Bayerischer Rundfunk and ARD). On March 15, 2006, it became known that Rubenbauer had ended his career as a sports commentator for ARD as a result of a dispute with sports coordinator Heribert Faßbender. Rubenbauer had accused Faßbender of not informing him in good time about the planned reporter assignments for the 2006 World Cup. As a result, Reinhold Beckmann, Steffen Simon and Gerd Gottlob were named as World Cup commentators.

== Awards ==
- 2003: Bayerischer Sportpreis
