= Theodor Wolff Prize =

German journalism award

The Theodor Wolff Prize is a German journalism prize. It has been awarded annually since 1962 in five categories, equal prizes of €6,000, by the Federal Association of German Newspaper Publishers. In addition, at irregular intervals, journalists are awarded the Theodor Wolff Prize for their life's work.

The award is dedicated to the memory of Theodor Wolff, who was forced into exile by the Nazis from Germany in February 1933 because of his Jewish origin and on account of ferocious opposition to the Nazi Party seizure of power the previous month. Until 1933, he was the liberal democratic chief editor of the Berliner Tageblatt.

== Jury ==
The jury in 2016 consisted of nine people:

- Nikolaus Blome (Bild)
- Wolfgang Büscher (Die Welt)
- Markus Günther (Frankfurter Allgemeine Sonntagszeitung)
- Peter Stefan Herbst (Saarbrücker Zeitung)
- Christian Lindner (Rhein-Zeitung)
- Lorenz Maroldt (Der Tagesspiegel)
- Bernd Mathieu (Aachener Zeitung)
- Annette Ramelsberger (Süddeutsche Zeitung)
- Cordula von Wysocki (Kölnische Rundschau)

== Notable recipients ==
1962:

- Thaddäus Troll (Bremer Nachrichten)

1964:

- Klaus Bresser (Kölner Stadt-Anzeiger)
- Karl-Hermann Flach (Frankfurter Rundschau)
- Kai Hermann (Die Zeit)

1966:

- Thomas von Randow (Die Zeit)
- Theo Sommer (Die Zeit)

1969:

- Günther von Lojewski (Frankfurter Allgemeine Zeitung)

1970:

- Gitta Bauer (Springer Auslandsdienst)

1971/72:

- Reinhard Appel (Süddeutsche Zeitung)

1972/73:

- Joachim Fest (Der Spiegel)

1973/74:

- Raimund Hoghe (Westfalen-Blatt)
- Hellmuth Karasek (Kölner Stadt-Anzeiger)

1983:

- Josef Joffe (Die Zeit)

1985:

- Thomas Kielinger (Die Welt)

1986:

- Rudolph Chimelli (Süddeutsche Zeitung)
- Cordt Schnibben (Die Zeit)

1994:

- Giovanni di Lorenzo (Süddeutsche Zeitung)

1999:

- Maxim Biller (Frankfurter Allgemeine Zeitung)

2001:

- Heribert Prantl (Süddeutsche Zeitung)

2002:

- Irena Brežná

2004:

- Andrea Böhm (Die Zeit)

2007:

- Nikolaus Blome (Die Welt)

2008:

- Carolin Emcke (Zeitmagazin)

2009:

- Bastian Obermayer (Frankfurter Allgemeine Zeitung)

2012:

- Harald Martenstein (Die Zeit)

2013:

- Robin Alexander
- Alfred Grosser

2014:

- Rudolph Chimelli

2017:

- Deniz Yücel

2018:

- Anne Lena Mösken, Lorenz Wagner, Malte Henk, Vanessa Vu, Hannes Koch, Günter Bannas (FAZ)

2019:

- Daniel Schulz, Gregor Peter Schmitz, Marius Buhl, Maris Hubschmid, Andrian Kreye, Michael Jürgs

2020:

- Katja Füchsel, Tina Kaiser, Hans-Georg Gottfried Dittmann, Julia Schaaf, Katrin Langhans

2021:

- Hatice Akyün, Wolfgang Bauer, Anna Petersen, Jeanne Jacobs, Sophie Anfang, Emily Engels, Felix Müller, Paul Nöllke and Lukas Schauer, Elisa Schwarz

2022:

- Judith von Plato, Christine Badke, Veit Ellerbrock, Marco Führer, Ulla Jürgensonn, Horst Komuth, Elena Pintus, Jennifer Seidel, Tom Steinicke, Sarah Uerlichs, Moritz Wüst, Ingo Meyer, Johannes Böhme, Caterina Lobenstein and Stephan Lebert

2023:

- Julia Ruhnau, Jan Georg Plavec and Simon Koenigsdorff, Dunja Ramadan, Moritz Aisslinger, Daniel Brössler

2024:

- Issio Ehrich, Fabian Huber, Agnes Polewka, Helene Bubrowski, Thilo Adam

2025:

- Thorsten Schmitz and Peter Münch, Sophie Sommer, Helmut Frangenberg and Laura Ostenda, Martin Spiewak, Bastian Berbner
