= Henri-Nannen-Schule =

German journalism school

Coordinates: 53.5458°N 9.9807°E

The Henri-Nannen-Schule, formerly Hamburger Journalistenschule, is the journalist school of Europe's largest publishing house, Gruner + Jahr (Brigitte, GEO, Stern), German weekly Die Zeit and national news magazine Der Spiegel. Its seat is Hamburg and it is considered one of the best schools of journalism in Germany, along with the German School of Journalism (Deutsche Journalistenschule) in Munich.

== History ==
The Henri-Nannen-Schule was founded in 1978 on initiative of the late Henri Nannen, founding editor of the German news magazine Stern. Wolf Schneider, a renowned journalist, later language style critic and author, became its first director. Since 2007, the post has been held by Andreas Wolfers.

In 2020, Distributed Denial of Secrets (DDoSecrets) published a copy of the Bahamas corporate registry. DDoSecrets partnered with European Investigative Collaborations and the Henri-Nannen-Schule journalism school to create the Tax Evader Radar, a project to review the dataset of almost one million documents. The project exposed the offshore holdings of prominent Germans, the tax activities of ExxonMobil, as well as offshore business entities belonging to the DeVos and Prince families.

== Education ==
The Henri-Nannen-Schule offers aspiring and experienced journalists a broad 18 months education encompassing magazine, newspaper, online, radio and television. Its curriculum consists of both four internships at major media outlets organised by the school (nine months) and seminars (eight months) given by experienced and award-winning journalists with varying specialities such as politics, arts and culture, religion, science, education, business and economics, investigative reporting, national and international affairs.

== Admission ==
Every 18 months, the Henri-Nannen-Schule selects 18 in a two-phase-procedure. The applicants minimum qualifications are the command of the German language, both spoken and written; the former age limit of 27 no longer exists. First, applicants are asked to research and write a report and a comment. The best 60 of usually 1,500 applicants are subsequently invited to turn in a personal letter and a CV. They are invited to Gruner+Jahr headquarters in Hamburg, where they research and write another report, edit news, sit a general knowledge and a picture test and pass a personal interview with a jury of preeminent editors and reporters. Tuition is free and all students receive a monthly stipend.

== Prominent Alumni ==
- Nikolaus Blome, vice editor-in-chief of Bild
- Jan Fleischhauer, columnist at Der Spiegel and Focus
- Peter-Matthias Gaede, editor-in-chief of GEO
- Christoph Keese, Senior Vice President Investor Relations and Public Affairs, Axel Springer AG
- Peter Kloeppel, former anchor and editor-in-chief of RTL Television
- Stefan Kornelius, senior foreign policy editor at Süddeutsche Zeitung
- Ildikó von Kürthy, German bestselling writer
- Souad Mekhennet, author of leading German and American papers
- Mathias Müller von Blumencron, editor-in-chief of digital products at Frankfurter Allgemeine Zeitung
- Petra Reski, journalist and author
- Marcel Rosenbach, reporter at Der Spiegel, Journalist of the Year (2013)
- Wulf Schmiese, anchorman at ZDF Television
- Cordt Schnibben, editor at Der Spiegel
- Thomas Urban, correspondent at Süddeutsche Zeitung
- Sonja Zekri, editor at Süddeutsche Zeitung
