= Theodor Wolff =

German writer

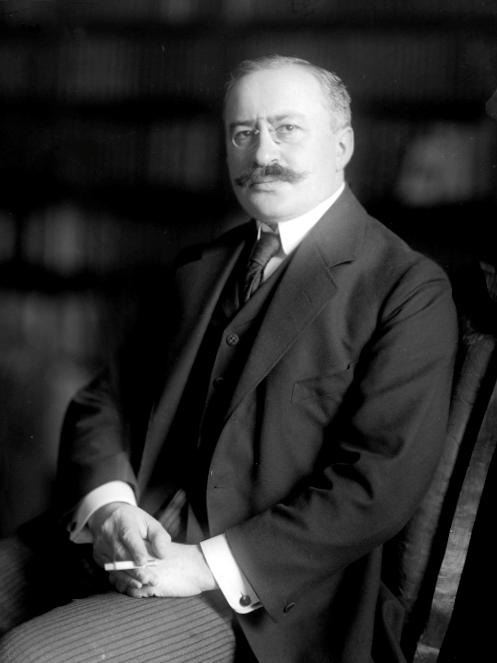
- Born: 2 August 1868; Berlin, Prussia
- Died: 23 September 1943 (aged 75); Berlin, Germany
- Occupations: Journalist and critic Dramatist; Newspaper editor (Berliner Tageblatt); Writer
- Political party: German Democratic Party (1918–1926)
- Spouse: Marie Louise Charlotte Anna Hickethier
- Parent(s): Adam Wolff; Recha Wolff, née Davidsohn

Theodor Wolff (2 August 1868 – 23 September 1943) was a German writer who was influential as a journalist, critic and newspaper editor. He was born and died in Berlin. Between 1906 and 1933 he was the chief editor of the politically liberal newspaper Berliner Tageblatt.

His talent as a writer won praise from an unlikely quarter: In 1939 Joseph Goebbels recommended his Propaganda Ministry staff to study Wolff's contributions in back numbers of the newspaper that he had edited. According to Goebbels, despite him being Jewish, the quality of Wolff's writing was matched by only very few in Germany. What Goebbels did not mention was that as a younger man he had himself on at least one occasion applied to work for the newspaper in question.

== Life ==
=== Early years ===
Theodor Wolff was born in Berlin, second of the four recorded children of a fabric wholesaler from Silesia called Adam Wolff by his marriage to Recha, née Davidsohn. Recha was a doctor's daughter from Danzig. Wolff grew up in a prosperous Jewish family. He rapidly achieved good results at the prestigious King William I Grammar school in Berlin.

He married in 1902, in Paris, the actress Marie Louise Charlotte Anna Hickethier (known as Änne), coming from a Protestant Prussian family. The couple had three children: Richard Wolff (born in Paris, 14 June 1906), Rudolf Wolff (born in Berlin, 9 July 1907) and Lilly Wolff (born in Berlin, 7 August 1909). The children were baptised as Protestants.

=== Journalism mostly ===
In 1887 Wolff's cousin Rudolf Mosse recruited him to his successful publishing conglomerate. Mosse was 25 years older than Wolff, to whom he provided a thorough commercial and journalistic training across all the departments of his publishing business, the "Mosse-Verlag". During these years Wolff also found time to write some early novels, inspired by Theodor Fontane whom he greatly admired, and several plays which were staged in Berlin, though in his memoirs he would later describe these as "not particularly distinguished". In 1889 he was one of the ten co-founders of the Berlin theatre company, Freie Bühne ("Free stage").

Wollf's written contributions to the Tageblatt focused initially on cultural matters and literature, but he soon switched his focus towards political journalism. An early journalistic success at the newspaper was a daily bulletin on the health of the emperor (who was dying of throat cancer). Emperor Frederick died in June 1888 and Wolff embarked on an itinerant career, writing pieces and sending them in to Berlin by telegraph from, successively, Denmark, Sweden, Norway and Italy. In 1894 the paper sent him to Paris, where he would live for the next twelve years.

As the Paris correspondent of the Berliner Tageblatt Wolff, identified in print only as "our Paris correspondent", produced numerous contributions covering public life in France. During 1896 he became known for his coverage of the Dreyfus affair, one of the most high-profile news stories of the decade in western Europe. His early ambitions to become a novelist were now being overtaken by his success as a journalist.

=== Editor-in-chief to the Berliner Tageblatt ===
==== 1906–1918 ====
In autumn 1906, Rudolf Mosse offered Theodor Wolff the top job at the Berliner Tageblatt. Between 1906 and 1933 Wolff served the Tageblatt as editor-in-chief, developing it into one of Germany's most influential newspapers. Circulation under his stewardship rose from 100,000 to more than 300,000. His powerful prose was notably on display in the Monday editions of the paper for which he wrote the lead article, frequently exhorting fellow citizens to political participation. In respect of foreign policy, he quickly positioned the Tageblatt in opposition to "great power politics", imperial and military assertiveness and the risk of international isolation to which these were leading Germany. On domestic issues the paper's attitude under Wolff favoured civil rights and a liberal-democratic approach, advocating a "parliamentarisation" ("Parlamentarisierung") of the constitution and vigorously opposing the "Dreiklassenwahlrecht" in force for the Prussian parliament's lower house which had been introduced in 1849 and which was, by the beginning of the twentieth century, widely perceived as a badly flawed application of the democratic ideal.

At this time Wolff promoted numerous writers including Victor Auburtin whose individualistic approach he valued and who played an important part in defining the newspaper's liberal profile. Meanwhile, Germany's traditionalist Chancellor, Bernhard von Bülow, refused any interviews or statements to the Tageblatt while his successor, Theobald von Bethmann Hollweg, instructed all government departments to steer well clear of the newspaper's reports and opinions.

In July 1916, the Berliner Tageblatt was temporarily banned. Wolff reacted by refusing to publish anything for several months, which was picked up and used abroad in the savage propaganda battle that was a major element in the increasingly desperate conduct of the First World War. Wolff refused to compromise his editorial line, and the Berliner Tageblatt continued to promote the politically toxic view that the only route to a lasting peace was for Germany to come to an understanding with France.

==== 1918–1933 ====
In November 1918 Theodor Wolff was one of the founders of the German Democratic Party (Deutsche Demokratische Partei, DDP), committed to individual freedom and social responsibility. He had himself played a central role in the party's defining manifesto, but he took no leadership position within the DDP preferring, not for the last time, the role of a powerful newspaper editor. It was in this role that he called on the government to reject the Treaty of Versailles. In 1920 Hermann Müller, who in the early summer was briefly the German Chancellor, invited Wolff to take on the position of German Ambassador to Paris but, again, Wolff opted to remain a Berlin-based journalist.

On 4 December 1926 Wolff resigned his DDP membership. The resignation came in response to the acceptance by a large number of the party's Reichstag Members of tightened censorship laws against so-called dirty and trashy literature. (Kurt Tucholsky, one of the Tageblatt's most high-profile contributors, had also, on the world stage, sharply condemned DDP support for these measures.) Wolff nevertheless remained powerfully influential, a leading advocate for democracy and moderation, welcomed as a dinner guest by various government ministers. Wolff was also continuing to attract important writers as contributors for the Tageblatt. In 1926 he persuaded the pugnaciously liberal journalist-lawyer Rudolf Olden to move his base from Vienna to Berlin.

Germany's military defeat and the catastrophic economic aftermath did much to discredit democratic politics during the 1920s, which saw a corresponding growth in support for right wing politics, which in their turn favoured somewhat 'tribal' definitions of the political sphere. Theodor Wolff and his Berliner Tageblatt (the "Jewish news-sheet", das Judenblatt) were increasingly targeted by nationalists and during the 1920s nationalists were increasingly setting the country's political agenda. His name started to appear on the death lists of various radical-right and populist groups, causing Wolff to become anxious that he might share the fate of Walther Rathenau, the generally popular Jewish Foreign Minister and fellow DDP member who had been shot dead by a gang of three extremists in June 1922. Anxiety that he might be murdered by racist extremists remained with him for the rest of his life. His counterpart at the right wing Hugenberg media group, editor in chief Friedrich Hussong, stirred up popular hatred of Wolff, whom he identified as a representing the liberal metropolitan press.

The Reichstag election of September 1930 transformed the country's political landscape, with the National Socialist party increasing its share of the popular vote from 2.6% to 18.3%, which under the country's multi-party system left it as the second largest party in the Reichstag. Right wing extremism was suddenly mainstream and at the Berliner Tageblatt the publisher's proprietor, Hans Lachmann-Mosse, who had taken over from his father-in-law, mandated a turn towards the right for the newspaper. The business was also in financial trouble thanks to poorly timed investment decisions and intensified competition from the by now openly anti-Semitic Hugenberg Group.

=== Exile ===
The night of 27 to 28 February 1933 was the night of the Reichstag fire. It was also the night on which Theodor Wolff, whose hostility to a Nazi future was undiminished and who had been warned by colleagues that his name was on the SA death list, fled Berlin. His initial destination, traveling via Munich, was the Tirol. From there he moved on to Switzerland. However, the Swiss refused to issue him with a residence permit and by the end of 1933 Theodor Wolff and his wife had ended up in Nice, which since 1860 had been part of France.

Theodor Wolff's last lead article in the Berliner Tageblatt appeared on 5 March 1933, the day of the last multi-party German election until 1949. In March 1933 the Tageblatt's proprietor (who himself, being Jewish, was effectively deprived of control over his business later in the month), removed Wolff from his editorship responding to political pressure following the flight from Berlin. In May 1933 Wolff's books were among those listed by the government for the public book burnings. Wolff celebrated his 65th birthday in 1933 and played very little part in the political struggles of the many German Jewish exiles who were gravitating to Nice at this time. His opinions nevertheless remained clear enough, and on 26 October 1937 he was deprived of his German citizenship.

In exile Wolff reverted to writing books, while still contributing occasional pieces of journalism to (non-German) newspapers. Two historical-political works met with little success. He dedicated his last novel, Die Schwimmerin ("The [female] Swimmer") to his secretary from the Berlin days, Ilse Stöbe (1911–1942). His project to have a film produced on the basis of this novel, with Greta Garbo in the starring role, could not be realised.

Wolff continued to distance himself from Zionist separatism, believing throughout his life in a "German-Jewish symbiosis" ("deutsch-jüdische Symbiose").

=== Arrest and death ===
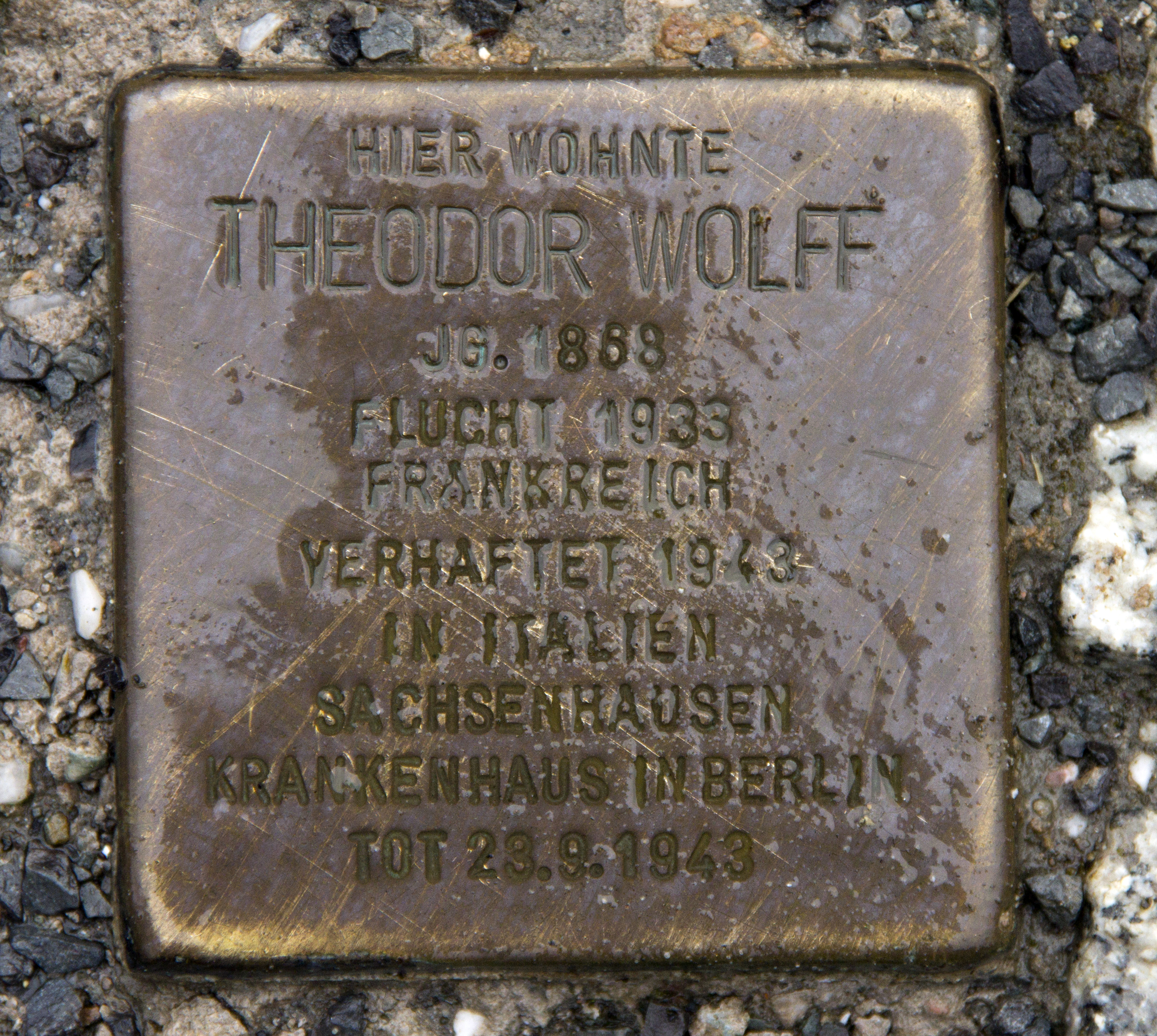
Stolperstein of Theodor Wolff

After the Fall of France on 22 June 1940 Theodor Wolff applied, unsuccessfully, for permission to emigrate to United States: he remained in Nice. The coastal strip along the south-eastern part of France including, from late 1942, Nice was in the process of being annexed by Italy, and on 23 May 1943 Theodor Wolff was arrested by the Italian civil authorities. He was handed over to the Gestapo and interned in a Marseille jail before being transferred to the Drancy detention centre near Paris. Drancy was used as a collection point for Jewish internees scheduled for deportation to internment camps and death camps in Germany, and Wolff now found himself transferred to Sachsenhausen concentration camp to the east of Berlin. Now aged 75, and ill with phlegmon, his fellow internees pleaded successfully for him to be sent to the Jewish Hospital in Berlin. Here he was admitted on 20 September 1943: he died three days later.

Theodor Wolff's body is buried in the "row of honour" at Berlin's Weißensee Cemetery.

== Posthumous honour ==
In 1961 the Theodor Wolff Prize for newspaper journalism was founded, and it has since 1962 been awarded annually. Since 1973 the prize has been awarded by the German Newspaper Publishers' Association (BDZV / Bundesverband Deutscher Zeitungsverleger).

== Published output (not a complete list) ==
- Der Heide ("The heathland"). Novel, Berlin 1891.
- Der Untergang ("The downfall"). Novel, Berlin 1892.
- Die stille Insel ("The quiet island"). Play in four acts, Berlin 1894.
- Die Sünder. Eine Liebesgeschichte ("The sinner. A love story"). Berlin 1894.
- Niemand weiß es ("Nobody knows"). Play in three acts, Munich 1895.
- Geistige und künstlerische Beziehungen zwischen Deutschland und Frankreich. In: Fünfundzwanzig Jahre Deutscher Zeitgeschichte – 1872–1897. Jubiläums-Schrift. Ed. by the editorial office of the Berliner Tageblatt, Rudolf Mosse, Berlin 1897, S. 139–148.
- Die Königin ("The queen"). Play in three acts, Cologne 1898 (second, strongly revised edition as play in four acts, Cologne 1904).
- Pariser Tagebuch ("Paris diary"). Munich 1908; new edition: Berlin 1927 (selection from the Parisian reports, released from 1894 to 1906).
- Spaziergänge ("Walks"). Cologne 1909.
- Vollendete Tatsachen, 1914–1917 ("Fait accompli, 1914–1917"). Berlin 1918.
- Das Vorspiel ("The prelude"). Munich 1924; Paris 1926.
- Anatole France. Berlin 1924 (self-published)
- Der Wettlauf mit der Schildkröte. Gelöste und ungelöste Probleme ("The footrace with the tortoise. Solved and unsolved problems"). Berlin 1929.
- Der Krieg des Pontius Pilatus ("The war of Pontius Pilate"). Zürich 1934; London 1935; Paris and New York 1936; Prague 1937.
- Der Marsch durch zwei Jahrzehnte ("March through two decades"). Amsterdam 1936; London 1936, Paris 1937; as a strongly augmented new edition under the title Die Wilhelminische Epoche ("The Wilhelminian epoch", 1989).
- Die Schwimmerin. Ein Roman aus der Gegenwart ("The swimmer. A novel from the present"). Zürich 1937.
