= Legacy Landscapes Fund =

Global nature conservation fund

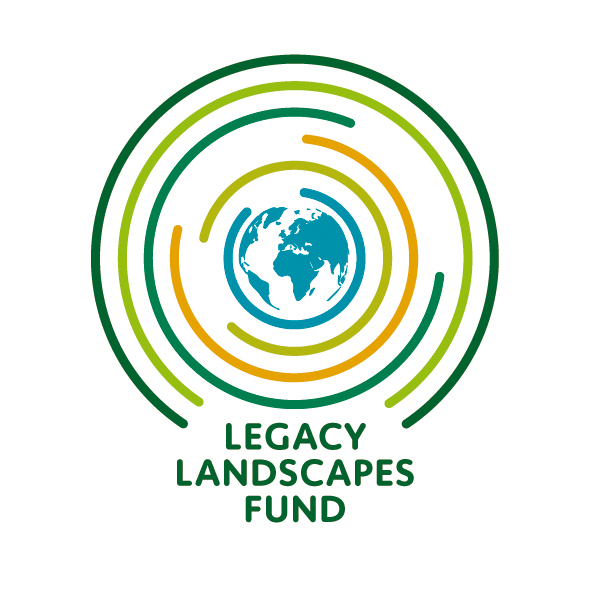
- Formation: December 8, 2020; 5 years ago
- Founder: Federal Ministry for Economic Cooperation and Development
- Founded at: Frankfurt am Main
- Type: Nonprofit Stiftung des öffentlichen Rechts
- VAT ID no.: 045 255 66517
- Headquarters: Frankfurt am Main
- Coordinates: 50.1119°N 8.6565°E
- Key people: Stefanie Lang (Executive director)
- Budget: (2020)
- Website: legacylandscapes.org

Legacy Landscapes Fund, (LLF), (German: Internationaler Naturerbe Fonds) is a not for profit foundation providing long-term financial support to protected areas in the Global South. The fund was founded in 2020 as part of efforts to reduce the biodiversity financing gap within a post-2020 framework under the Convention on Biological Diversity (CBD). The fund was launched on 19 May 2021, and is based in Frankfurt am Main, Germany.

== History ==
Legacy Landscapes Fund was established following a global biodiversity summit in Kunming, China in October 2020 as an independent charitable foundation under German law by the German Federal Ministry for Economic Cooperation and Development (BMZ) and KfW Development Bank (KfW) in December 2020.

In May 2022, German newspaper Rhein-Zeitung reported that the German Federal Ministry for Economic Cooperation and Development invested an additional EUR 100 million into the LLF. France announced in 2021 that it would support LLF starting in 2022.

== Grant program ==
Legacy Landscapes Fund operates a grant program that provides long-term financing for terrestrial biodiversity conservation. It offers grants of US$1 million per year for at least fifteen years, for up to 30 conversation areas with a combined area exceeding 60,000 km^{2} (23,000 mi^{2}) in Africa, Asia, and Latin America. The first seven pilot projects were launched in Zimbabwe, Zambia, Republic of Congo, Angola, Indonesia, Cambodia, and Bolivia.

In September 2021 it was reported that LLF would receive funds for the Iona National Park in Angola and the Odzala-Kokoua National Park in the Republic of Congo. In summer of 2022, it was reported that LLF would support Gonarezhou National Park in Zimbabwe.

== Funding ==
Legacy Landscapes Fund secures its funding from both public and private donors. The German Federal Ministry for Economic Cooperation and Development kick-started the fund with EUR 82.5 million.
