= Von Lojewski =

Von Lojewski is a surname. Notable people with the surname include:

- Günther von Lojewski (1935–2023), German journalist, television presenter, and author
- Wolf von Lojewski (born 1937), German journalist
