= Heinz Knobloch =

German writer and journalist

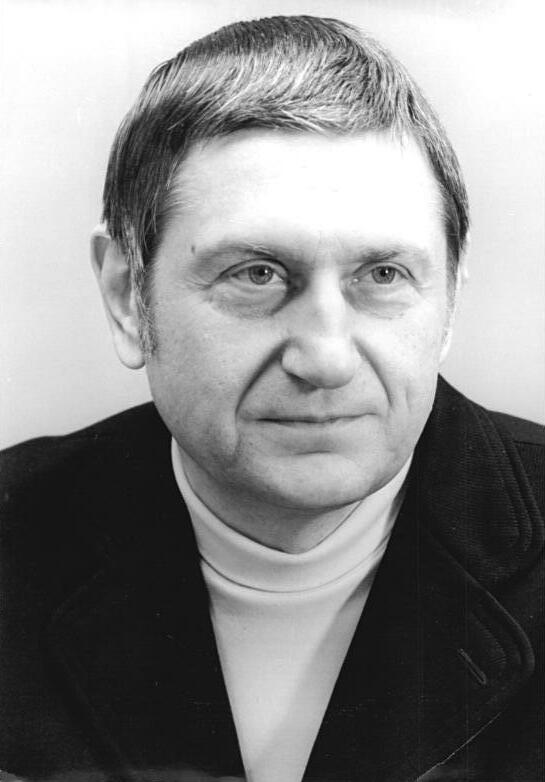
- Heinz Knobloch (1976)
- Born: 3 March 1926; Dresden, Saxony, Germany
- Died: 24 July 2003 (aged 77); Pankow, Berlin, Germany
- Occupations: Writer journalist
- Political party: SED
- Spouse: Helga Leutloff (1953)
- Children: Dagmar (1957); Daniel (1965)
- Parent(s): Gerhardt Knobloch; Fridl Müller/Knobloch

Heinz Knobloch (3 March 1926 – 24 July 2003) was a German writer and journalist, who spent most of his professional career working in the German Democratic Republic (East Germany).

== Life ==
=== Early years ===
Knobloch was born in Dresden, the son of a photographer. When his father became unemployed the family moved to Berlin in 1935. He started a commercial training with a publishing business in 1942, but in 1943 he was conscripted into the army and was sent as a soldier to France.

=== Army life ===
He deserted from the army near St. Lo in July 1944, shortly after the Normandy landings of the Allies. Knobloch spent the next four or so years as a Prisoner of War in the US and in Scotland. In the USA he gained hands-on experience in Alabama of the agricultural business (maize, sugar cane, groundnuts/ peanuts, tomatoes, cotton), in Pennsylvania, of industrial work, and in Virginia of timber logging and garbage disposal. As a result of his transfer to Scotland in 1946 he was able to add road construction, fertiliser production, sheep wool processing and seed research to his list of experiences, and he also undertook a language course, receiving a "cum laude" (with distinction) diploma in English.

=== Back to Berlin ===
He was able to return to Berlin in February 1948. In 1948 he volunteered to work for the Berliner Zeitung and became a script editor for a press picture publisher. In 1949 he joined the new country's recently created ruling Socialist Unity Party (SED / Sozialistische Einheitspartei Deutschlands), and in 1953 he co-founded and joined East German's new mass-circulation Wochenpost (newspaper), taking responsibility for "puzzles, mental recreation and humour" ("Rätsel, Denksport und Humor"). Work on the Wochenpost quickly became a principal vehicle for Knobloch's professional success over more than three decades. He served as its culture editor from 1957 till 1965, and between 1968 and 1988 contributed a weekly Feuilleton-format opinion column.

Between 1954 and 1960 he undertook a correspondence course in journalism with the Karl Marx University (as it was then known) in Leipzig, ending up with a Diploma in Journalism. In 1962 he became a member of the (East) German Writers' Association.

=== Personal ===
In 1953 Heinz Knobloch married Helga Leutloff, then aged 24. The marriage produced a daughter and a son born respectively in 1957 and 1965. Knobloch died on 24 July 2003 in Pankow (Berlin), but the wish he had originally published in his book "Alte und neue Berliner Grabsteine" ("Berlin gravestones, old and new) was respected, and his body was taken back to his birth city of Dresden for burial.

After his death in 2003 the "Freundeskreis Heinz Knobloch" ("Heinz Knobloch Circle of Friends") was created, in order to take care of his legacy and honour his works.

== Writing ==
Heinz Knobloch was known in Germany for his Feuilletons. The flexibility of the feuilleton form makes it hard to define succinctly, but the principal ingredients of Knoblich's feuilletons are nevertheless familiar enough to English speaking readers. Over four decades he contributed more than 1,600 of these insightful sometimes whimsical and relatively compact opinion pieces, often triggered by some passing personal experience. Most of them appeared between 1958 and 1978 in the weekly newspaper Wochenpost under the by-line "Mit beiden Augen" ("With both eyes [open]"). The newspaper had a circulation which for much of the time exceeded 1.3 million giving rise to a very large readership for Knobloch's column, and indicating that he was able to soften any implicit criticisms of the single-party state and its plethora of agencies with sufficient charm and subtlety to remain "within the lines" of official sensitivities. The feuilletons that appeared in Wochenpost were illustrated by the graphic artist and illustrator Wolfgang Würfel, and were subsequently reproduced in a succession of collected volumes which comprise the majority of the books published under Knobloch's name. At the same time as making a living with his pen by writing modern feuilletons, Knobloch researched hitherto largely forgotten nineteenth and early twentieth century users of the genre in Berlin such as Julius Rodenberg and Victor Auburtin.

He also produced intensively researched, accurately presented and illuminating biographies of other individuals from German history many of whom had disappeared from the historical mainstream during the turbulent middle decades of the twentieth century. His book "Herr Moses in Berlin" ("Mr Moses in Berlin") portrays the eighteenth century Berlin philosopher (and composer's grandfather) Moses Mendelssohn. In "Meine liebste Mathilde" ("My dearest Matilda") Knobloch tells of Mathilde Jacob, Rosa Luxemburg's longstanding secretary and confidante, who was murdered in a concentration camp. These books were popular, notwithstanding the description of Knobloch by one critic as a "Hobby-Historiker" ("Hobby Historian").

Beyond simple biography, "Der beherzte Reviervorsteher" ("The Courageous District Overseer") recounted the story of how the burning of the Berlin New Synagogue was thwarted in Oranienburger Straße during the Kristallnacht pogroms of November 1938, as a result of the courage of the police officer Wilhelm Krützfeld.

"Der arme Epstein" ("For poor [Sally] Epstein") shed light on the death of Horst Wessel, a man whose name would have been known to every German of Knobloch's generation thanks to the Horst Wessel song which the government had designated a parallel national anthem in Germany during the Nazi years.

== Awards and honours (not a complete list) ==
- 1963: Literature Prize of the Free German Trade Union Federation
- 1965: Heinrich Heine Prize from the Culture Ministry
- 1979: Goethe Prize from the City of Berlin
- 1980: Louis Fürnberg Prize
- 1986: Lion-Feuchtwanger Prize
- 1986: National Prize of East Germany
- 1994: Moses Mendelssohn Prize from the Berlin Senate
- 1998: Order of Merit of Berlin

On 3 March 2005 the piece of green space in front of the row of houses which for many years had included Knobloch's home was renamed "Heinz-Knobloch-Platz". More recently, on 24 July 2013, a memorial tablet was placed on the outside of his former home in Berlin-Pankow.

== Selected publications ==
=== Books ===
- Ein gewisser Reginald Hinz. Eulenspiegel-Verlag 1963
- Pardon für Bütten. Eulenspiegel-Verlag 1965, Verlag der Nation 1976

=== Feuilleton collections ===
- Mir gegenüber. 1960
- Herztöne und Zimmermannssplitter. 1962
- Die guten Sitten. 1964
- Du liebe Zeit. 1966
- Täglich geöffnet. 1970
- Rund um das Bett. 1970
- Bloß wegen der Liebe. 1971
- Beiträge zum Tugendpfad. 1972
- Innere Medizin. 1972
- Man sieht sich um und fragt. 1973
- Allerlei Spielraum. 1973
- Kreise ziehen. 1974
- Stäubchen aufwirbeln. 1974
- Schattensprünge. 1975
- Das Lächeln der Zeitung. 1975
- Der Blumenschwejk. 1976, Mitteldeutscher Verlag Halle 1984
- Der Berliner zweifelt immer. Buchverlag Der Morgen, Berlin 1977
- Mehr war nicht drin. 1979, Mitteldeutscher Verlag Halle 3. Auflage 1983
- Nachträgliche Leckerbissen. Aufbau-Verlag, Berlin, Weimar 1979. 180 S.
- Handwärmekugeln. Verlag Tribüne, Berlin 1979
- Berliner Fenster – Feuilletons. 1981, Mitteldeutscher Verlag Halle 1987, ISBN 3-354-00140-2.
- Stadtmitte umsteigen – Berliner Phantasien. 1982, viele Neuauflagen bis 2002, Jaron Verlag Berlin 2002, ISBN 3-89773-042-1.
- Angehaltener Bahnhof. Das Arsenal, Berlin 1984
- Nicht zu verleugnen – Feuilletons. 1985, Mitteldeutscher Verlag Halle 2. Auflage 1986, ISBN 3-354-00125-9.
- Zur Feier des Alltags – Feuilletons. 1986, Buchclub 65 Berlin 1988, ISBN 3-7464-0043-0.
- Berliner Grabsteine. 1987, Morgenbuch-Verlag Berlin 1991, ISBN 3-371-00352-3.
  - ⇒ Alte und neue Grabsteine. Jaron Verlag 2000, ISBN 3-89773-022-7.
- Im Lustgarten – ein preußischer Garten im Herzen Berlins (mit Hendrik Gottfriedsen) 1989, Jaron Verlag 2001, ISBN 3-89773-032-4.
- Die schönen Umwege – Beobachtungen. 1993, Transit-Verlag Berlin 3. Aufl. 1996, ISBN 3-88747-083-4.
- Geisterbahnhöfe – Westlinien unter Ostberlin (mit Michael Richter und Thomas Wenzel), 1994, Links-Verlag Berlin 2008, ISBN 978-3-86153-506-5.
- Mißtraut den Grünanlagen! – Extrablätter. Transit-Verlag Berlin 1996, ISBN 3-88747-108-3.
- "Lässt sich das drucken?" – Feuilletons gegen den Strich. UVK Konstanz 2002, ISBN 3-89669-354-9.
- Berlins alte Mitte – rund um den Lustgarten; Geschichte zum Begehen. Jaron Verlag Berlin 1996, ISBN 3-932202-10-4.
- Gartenlust und Gartenliebe – Abenteuer hinterm Zaun. edition hüne Berlin 2009, ISBN 978-3-941754-00-3.

=== Epilogue ===
- zu Julius Rodenberg – Bilder aus dem Berliner Leben. Neuauflage. Berlin 1987, S. 355–374.

=== Monographs ===
- Herr Moses in Berlin. 1979, 1993, Taschenbuch 1996, Jaron-Verlag Berlin 2006, ISBN 3-89773-076-6.
- Meine liebste Mathilde – Die Freundin der Rosa Luxemburg. 1985, Fischerverlag, Frankfurt 1997, ISBN 3-596-12803-X.
- Der beherzte Reviervorsteher – Ungewöhnliche Zivilcourage am Hackeschen Markt. 1989, Jaron Verlag Berlin 2003, ISBN 3-89773-072-3.
- Der arme Epstein – Wie der Tod zu Horst Wessel kam. 1993, Aufbau-Verlag, Berlin 1996, ISBN 3-7466-8021-2.
- Die Suppenlina – Eine Menschenfreundin. Ed. Hentrich, Berlin 1997, ISBN 3-89468-241-8.

=== Biographical ===
- Nase im Wind – Zivile Abenteuer. Transit-Verlag, Berlin 1994, ISBN 3-88747-091-5.
- Eierschecke – Eine Dresdner Kindheit. Transit-Verlag, Berlin 1995, ISBN 3-88747-104-0.
- Eine Berliner Kindheit. Jaron Verlag, Berlin 1999, ISBN 3-89773-002-2.
- Mit beiden Augen – Bd. 1 Von Dresden nach Tennessee. 1999.
- Mit beiden Augen – Bd. 2 Mein Leben zwischen den Zeilen. Transit-Verlag, Berlin 1999, ISBN 3-88747-124-5.
- Das Lächeln der Wochenpost. Jaron Verlag, Berlin 2002, ISBN 3-89773-050-2.
- Schriftwechsel 1997–2003 Heinz Knobloch – Rolf Pfeiffer. Berlin 2006, ISBN 3-8334-4468-1.
