= Marcel Rosenbach =

Marcel Rosenbach (born 1972, Koblenz) is a German journalist.

At Hamburg University he studied political science and journalism (1993–1998), and after graduating, he attended the Henri Nannen School of Journalism.

Before joining Der Spiegel in 2001, he worked as an editor for Berliner Zeitung.

== Books ==
- Staatsfeind WikiLeaks. Wie eine Gruppe von Netzaktivisten die mächtigsten Nationen der Welt herausfordert ("State Enemy WikiLeaks. How a Group of Net Activists Challenges the Most Powerful Nations of the World"), DVA, München 2011, ISBN 978-3-421-04518-8.
- with Holger Stark: Der NSA-Komplex. Edward Snowden und der Weg in die totale Überwachung, Deutsche Verlags Anstalt, München 2014, ISBN 978-3-421-04658-1.

== Awards ==
- Journalist of the Year, 2013 (with Holger Stark, awarded by Medium Magazin)
- German TV Award, 2014
