= Rheinischer Merkur =

Conservative German periodical

The Rheinischer Merkur (literally "Rhineland Mercury") was a nationwide conservative German weekly newspaper appearing on Thursdays. It was published in Bonn. Its managing director was Bert Günther Wegener, and the editor in chief from 1994 to 2010 was Michael Rutz. Its circulation in the third quarter of 2003 was 105,422.

The editorial board of the Rheinischer Merkur was advised by a board of publishers consisting of senior figures of public life such as Roman Herzog, Jean-Claude Juncker and Paul Kirchhof.

The last full-fledged issue was on 25 November 2010. Since December 2010, the "Merkur" has been published under the name Christ & Welt (literally "Christian & World") as a weekly supplement to Die Zeit.

== See also ==
- Thomas Kielinger (Editor in chief 1985–1994)
- Michael Mertes (Foreign editor 1999–2002)
