= Bild Politik =

Weekly German political magazine

- Logo of Bild-Politik
- Editor-in-chief: Nikolaus Blome
- Categories: News magazine
- Frequency: Weekly
- Publisher: Axel Springer SE
- First issue: January 2019
- Final issue: June 2019
- Country: Germany
- Language: German

Bild Politik was a German political weekly magazine. It appears as a project of Germany's biggest yellow press newspaper Bild. Bild Politik was tested from 8 February 2019 to 5 June 2019 in northern Germany. Editor-in-chief was Nikolaus Blome, who is also deputy editor-in-chief of Bild. The initial idea for Bild Politik was by chief executive officer of News Media at Axel Springer, Selma Stern. The approximately 50-page booklet is made by the 40-member editorial staff of the Bildzeitung.

Axel Springer's press office wrote after ending the magazine in June 2019: "First results from market research attest that readers appreciate above all the innovative, concise and comprehensible thematic presentation, as well as the concentration on the essentials." The market data would be evaluated and the results would then be used to decide whether Bild Politik has potential for a "satisfactory economic perspective".
