= Theo Sommer =

German newspaper editor (1930–2022)

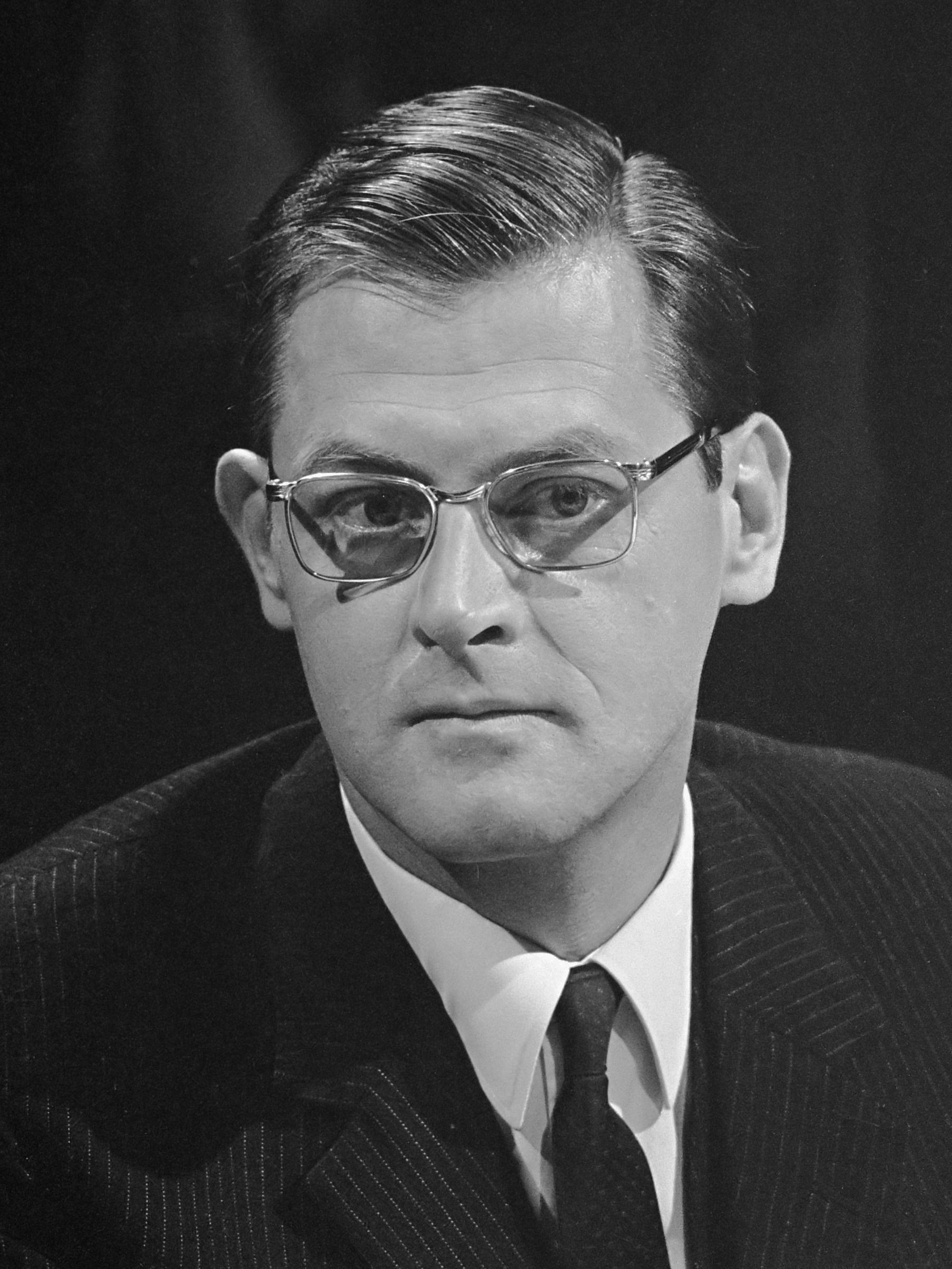
- Sommer in 1967
- Born: 10 June 1930; Konstanz, Baden, Germany
- Died: 22 August 2022 (aged 92); Hamburg, Germany
- Organizations: Die Zeit
- Awards: Theodor Wolff Prize; Order of Merit of the Federal Republic of Germany

Academic background
- Education: University of Tübingen
- Thesis: Deutschland und Japan zwischen den Mächten, 1935-1940: vom Antikominternpakt zum Dreimächtepakt (1962)
- Doctoral advisor: Hans Rothfels
- Website: www.theosommer.de

Theo Sommer (10 June 1930 – 22 August 2022) was a German newspaper editor and intellectual. He began working for Die Zeit in 1958, rising to an editor-in-chief and publisher. His editorials for Die Zeit shaped the paper's social-liberal attitude. He advocated the policy of détente with the Eastern bloc states (Entspannungspolitik). From 1992, Sommer was publisher of Die Zeit, together with Marion Dönhoff and Helmut Schmidt. He was considered one of Germany's authorities on international relations and strategic issues.

== Life and career ==
Born in Konstanz, Republic of Baden, on 10 June 1930, Sommer grew up in Schwäbisch Gmünd and was educated at the National Political Institutes of Education in Sonthofen. He was drafted into the Volkssturm in 1945. After World War II, he found out about the lies and atrocities of the Nazi regime, primarily by following the Nuremberg trials and reading Eugen Kogon's book Der SS-Staat. Sommer obtained his Abitur from Schwäbisch Gmünd in 1949 and then lived in Sweden for nine months. He studied English, history and political science at the University of Tübingen, Manchester College in Indiana and the University of Chicago. He earned a PhD in Tübingen with his thesis "Germany and Japan between the Powers, 1935–1940", supervised by Hans Rothfels. He began his career as a journalist with the Rems-Zeitung, a local paper in Schwäbisch Gmünd.

Sommer joined the weekly Die Zeit as a political correspondent in 1958, and was responsible for foreign politics and security politics. He became deputy editor-in chief in 1968, and editor-in-chief in 1973. He took a break from the paper in 1969 and 1970 to work for the Federal Ministry of Defence, for the "White Paper" (Weißbuch) of the Bundeswehr, joining the planning staff of then-minister Helmut Schmidt. His editorials for Die Zeit in the 1970s shaped the paper's social-liberal attitude, and supported the policy of détente with the Eastern bloc states (Entspannungspolitik). For decades, Sommer encouraged tolerance and Western support for East Germany. From 1992, Sommer was publisher of Die Zeit, together with Marion Dönhoff and Helmut Schmidt. He retired from the position in 2000, but kept writing for the paper as an editor-at-large.

Sommer was a member of the Trilateral Commission, of the International Institute for Strategic Studies, and of the German advisory committee of the German Marshall Fund. He was a member of the advisory board of the Bertelsmann Stiftung from 1990 to 1996. Since 2004, Sommer was an editor-at-large for Times Media, which publishes the newspapers The Atlantic Times and The German Times. He was a member of the Steering Committee of the Bilderberg Group.

In 2014, he was found guilty of tax evasion, and sentenced to 19 months of prison on probation. In 2016, American historian Alexander J. Motyl criticised Sommer for "closing his eyes to the mass murders of the Soviet regime", "disregard" for the Baltic states and Poland, and a "classically colonial" attitude toward Ukraine.

Sommer died in Hamburg on 22 August 2022, at the age of 92. He did not recover from a fall at his home, which had left him in pain.

Sommer was regarded as one of Germany's experts on international relations and strategic issues. According to Die Zeit, "he decisively shaped" the paper into a "cosmopolitan, liberal publication, [which] welcomes debate" with "his temperament, his energy, his shrewd judgment and his cheerfulness" ("mit seinem Temperament, seiner Tatkraft, seinem klugen Urteil und seiner Fröhlichkeit als weltoffenes, liberales, debattenfreudiges Blatt maßgeblich geprägt hat").

== Honours and awards ==
- 1966: Theodor Wolff Prize
- 1998: Order of Merit of the Federal Republic of Germany
- 2002: Bundeswehr Cross of Honour in Gold
- 2012: Honorary Senator of the Helmut Schmidt University
