= Petra Reski =

German journalist and writer

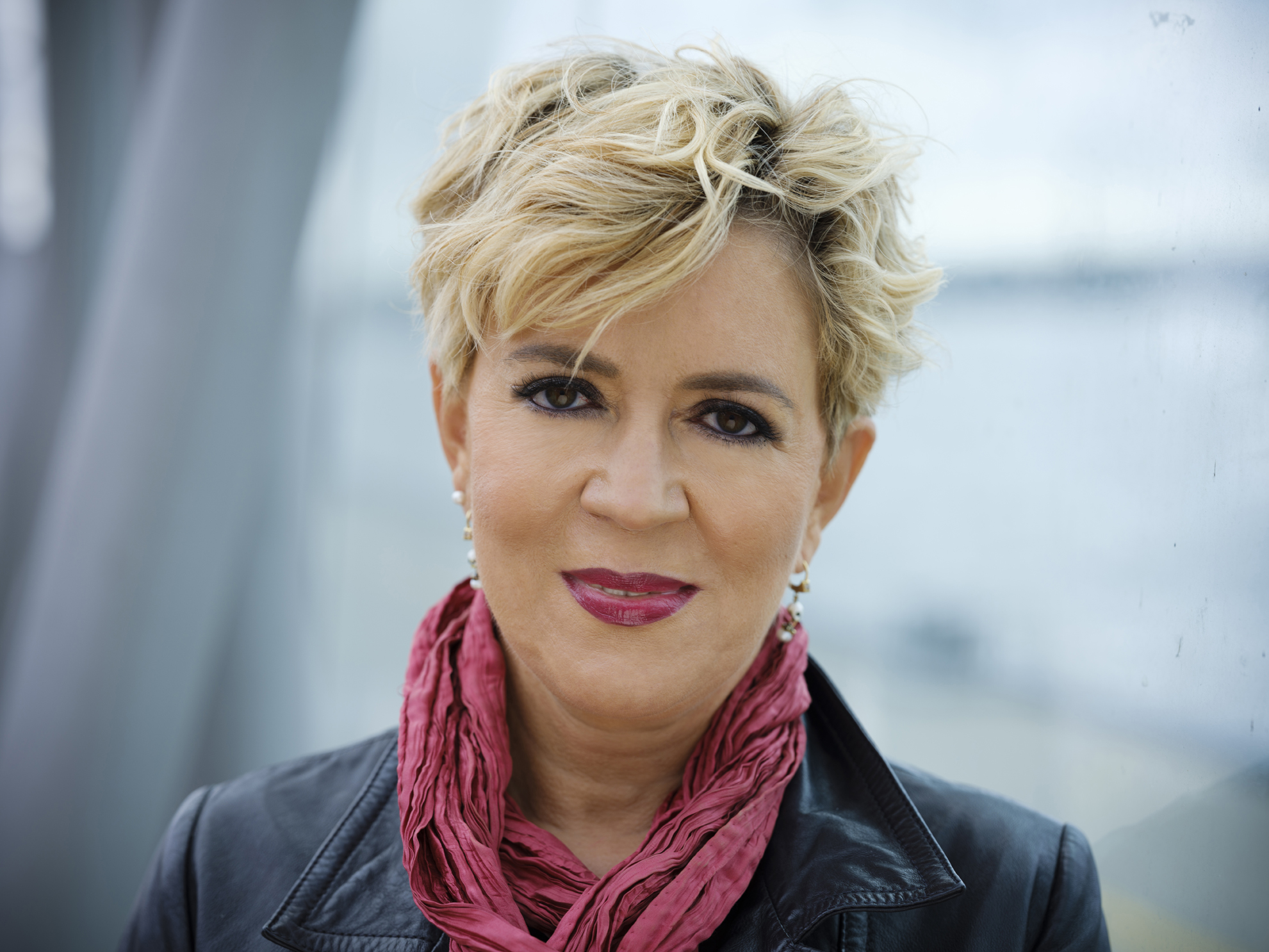
Petra Reski

Petra Reski (born 1958, in Kamen) is a German journalist and author renowned for her anti-Mafia publications.

Her father came from East Prussia and her mother from Silesia. She grew up in the Ruhr Valley. After her studies of romance languages, literature and social sciences in the University of Trier, in Münster and Paris she attended the Henri Nannen Schule (named in honour of Henri Nannen). She began working in 1988 as an editor on the foreign desk of Stern. She has also worked for other German-speaking magazines and written several books.

She has received numerous prizes for her literary and journalistic work. In the mass media she is best known for her anti-mafia essays. Reski has lived in Italy since 1989 and speaks Italian fluently. One of her best friends is the American author Donna Leon in Venice. Leon is quoted on the cover of Reski's book Mafia. A Tale of Godfathers, Pizzerias and Fake Priests as saying: Everything I know about the Mafia, I am indebted to Petra Reski.
