= Gregor Peter Schmitz =

German journalist

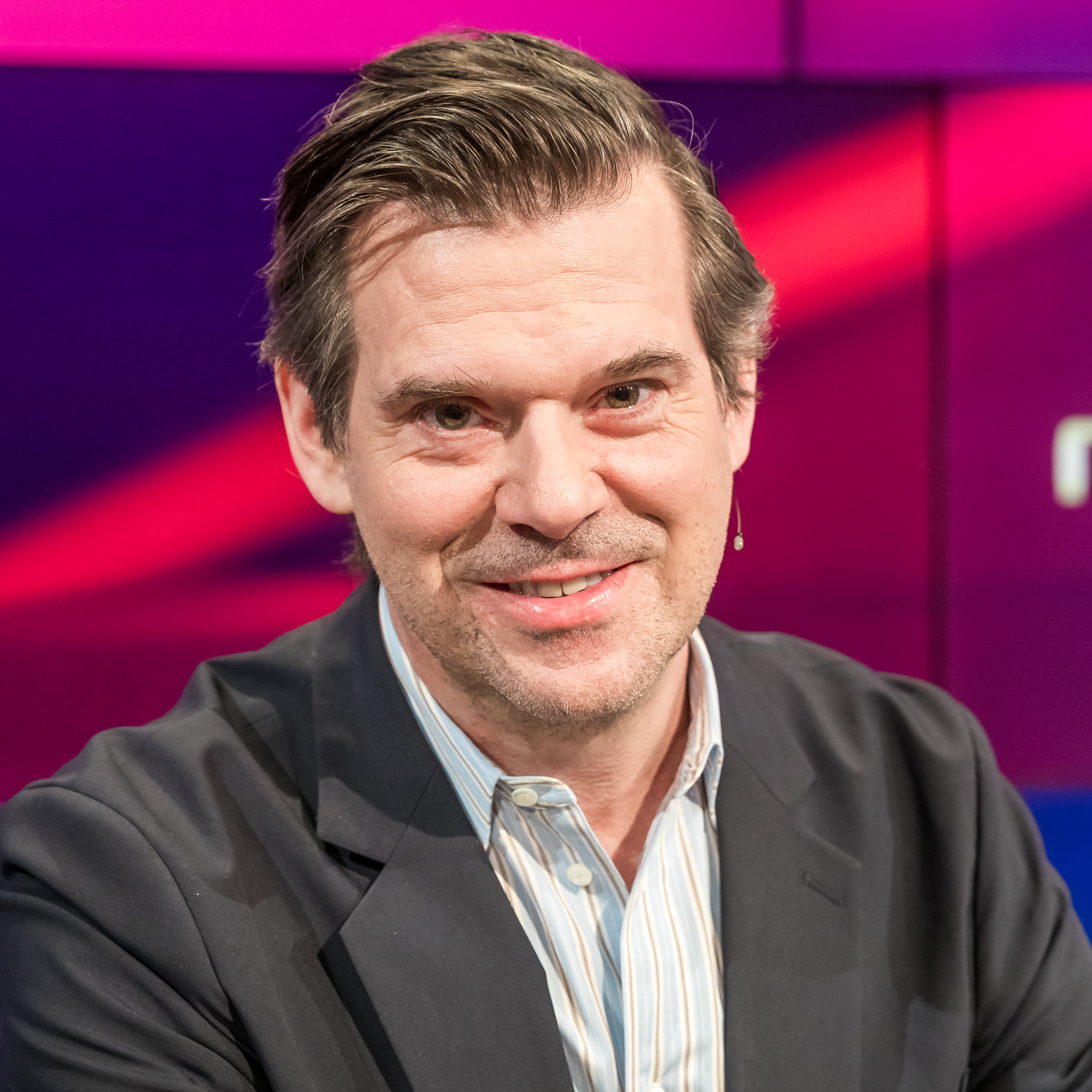
Gregor Peter Schmitz in 2026

Gregor Peter Schmitz (born 1975) is a German journalist, lawyer, and author. Since May 2022, he has been the chairman of the editorial board of Stern.

== Career ==
He graduated from LMU Munich, University of Cambridge, Harvard Kennedy School, and University of Erfurt.

=== Augsburger Allgemeine ===
At the beginning of 2018, he succeeded Walter Roller as editor-in-chief of the Augsburger Allgemeine.

At the end of 2018, a 100-member jury of the trade magazine Medium Magazin named him one of the "Journalists of the Year" (3rd place in the regional editor-in-chief category). The jury praised Schmitz for developing the Augsburger Allgemeine "remarkably quickly" and for regularly making headlines beyond Bavaria, such as with his talk evening with Chancellor Angela Merkel.

In 2018, Schmitz was also nominated as "Newspaper Maker of the Year" at the Lead Awards, one of Germany's most prestigious media prizes. The jury stated that regional newspapers, which face the greatest journalistic challenges due to societal divisions, currently produce "the most remarkable publishing and editorial achievements."

The Augsburger Allgemeine also won eight awards at the European Newspaper Awards that year.

In June 2019, Schmitz was awarded the Theodor Wolff Prize, Germany's most prestigious newspaper award. Later that year, he also received a silver Lead Award as "Newspaper Maker of the Year." The jury praised the nominees' "service to democracy" and their pursuit of "a tolerant and enlightened society," noting that Schmitz demonstrated "how to make newspapers today" through research and headlines.

At the end of 2019, Schmitz also placed second in the "Journalists of the Year" awards in one of the editor-in-chief categories. The 100-member jury of Medium Magazin praised him for making the Augsburger Allgemeine a nationally recognized regional newspaper with steadily increasing digital subscriptions.

Also highlighted were the new conversation series "Augsburger Allgemeine Live," featuring high-profile guests such as Chancellor Angela Merkel, Green Party Chairman Robert Habeck, Siemens CEO Joe Kaeser, author Ferdinand von Schirach, TV presenters Anne Will and Markus Lanz, and entertainer Harald Schmidt, as well as Schmitz's morning newsletter "Sechsum6." The Augsburger Allgemeine was among the most cited newspapers in the country in 2018, 2019, and 2020.

In February 2022, Schmitz left the Augsburger Allgemeine and joined RTL on April 1, 2022.

=== Editor-in-Chief of Stern ===
In May 2022, RTL announced that Schmitz would become the chairman of the editorial board of Stern. In the spring of 2023, it was announced that Schmitz would also take responsibility for GEO and Capital, overseeing these brands. Schmitz and Thomas Rabe announced their strategy to increase the number of digital subscriptions to Stern to 100,000 by 2025. However, in June 2023, Schmitz revised this goal in an interview with the Süddeutsche Zeitung and set a new target date of 2026. He did not provide a reason for the change in the target date.

In his first year at Stern, both sales and the number of subscribers fell by around six percent. Gross advertising revenue from advertising pages in Stern fell by about 17 percent and 30 percent in the economically important months of November and December, respectively, compared to the previous year. As a result, Stern fell behind Spiegel, Zeit, and Bild am Sonntag in gross advertising revenue for the first time in decades in 2022, having previously led the ranking for several consecutive decades. In 2023, the downward trend in subscriptions accelerated. Stern reported 144,948 subscribers to the IVW at the beginning of the year, but by mid-August, this number had dropped to 131,523 subscribers, a decline of more than 9.2 percent. Stern performed significantly worse than other German media: Its largest competitor, Spiegel, lost only 217 subscribers over the same period, while Focus even reported gains in subscription numbers.

The decline in print under Schmitz could not be offset by the digital business with stern.de, which fell from around 70 million visits in May 2022 to 55 million visits in May 2023. In August 2023, stern.de reached around 43 million visits, the lowest value since April 2017 according to IVW. In September 2023, this value dropped again to just 41.3 million visits. The industry portal Meedia described Schmitz's style at Stern as a "much more conservative line […] that focuses on traditional newspaper-making virtues – so far with rather modest success."

In August 2023, an interview with author Ferdinand von Schirach about his book Rain attracted attention. Schmitz announced the interview in the Editorial as "the most intense conversation" Schirach had with the two interviewers, Schmitz himself and Hannes Roß. On the cover, the piece was presented with the subtitle "Germany's Most Successful Author as Private as Never Before." However, as the industry portal Übermedien revealed, extensive parts of the interview were almost word-for-word identical to an interview Schirach gave a year earlier to the Süddeutsche Zeitung Magazin. Both Schirach and the interviewers, Hannes Roß and Gregor Peter Schmitz, used statements from the previous interview without citing their source. The visual design of the covers was nearly identical, consisting mainly of a black-and-white portrait of Schirach with a highlighted quote about his depression. In both photos, Schirach poses with a cigarette in hand, wearing a shirt and suit, and both photos were taken by the same photographer, Julia Sellmann.

At the end of 2023, an interview with Ruth Maria Kubitschek appeared in Stern under the title: "Could you write that this was my last interview? I think everything has been said now." According to research by the industry portal Medieninsider, Yvonne von Stempel, Kubitschek's former PR manager, was involved in the interview. Von Stempel was listed as an author in the online version of the interview, but her relationship with Kubitschek was not transparently explained in the article. The Stern described the listing of von Stempel as a "gesture of gratitude" and saw "no way" that journalistic independence was compromised.

Media Concentration Criticism

Since Schmitz joined Gruner + Jahr and promoted its integration with RTL, there has been criticism of increased media concentration at Stern. In an interview with the Süddeutsche Zeitung, Schmitz responded: "No one has ever told me: Do something on RTL in Stern." and "I never thought people would accuse us of simply doing cross-promotion for RTL." Medieninsider later reported on increased media concentration at RTL. Stern published an "extensive announcement including price tiers" for the launch of RTL+'s music offering. Additionally, "a news story about the app's expansion to include podcasts" followed. Under the "Stern-Charts" brand, a monthly podcast ranking was published in the print edition of Stern, "commissioned by RTL+ Music" and often featuring RTL formats. According to Medieninsider's research, an article about "donations and extraordinary actions" by UFA in the Ahr Valley appeared on stern.de, written by a UFA spokesperson without attribution. UFA, like Stern, is owned by Bertelsmann. An interview with RTL juror Dieter Bohlen that included Bohlen on the cover also drew attention.

=== Memberships and functions ===
Schmitz is actively involved as a member of the board of trustees of the International Journalists' Programs (IJP) and as chairman of the alumni association of McCloy Scholars at Harvard University.

== Publications ==
- Geschichte per Gesetz? Die Debatten zum Umgang mit dem Phänomen der Holocaustleugnung in Deutschland, Großbritannien und den Vereinigten Staaten von Amerika. (Erfurt, Univ., Diss., 2007).
- with George Soros: Wetten auf Europa. Warum Deutschland den Euro retten muss, um sich selbst zu retten. Deutsche Verlags-Anstalt (DVA), Munich 2013, ISBN 978-3-421-04632-1

== Awards ==
- Henri-Nannen-Preis
- Arthur-F.-Burns-Preis
- Young Leader of the American Council on Germany
- Member of the think tank Atlantic Council
- McCloy Scholar of the German National Academic Foundation
- Theodor Wolff Prize 2019 in the local opinion category.
- 2018: 3rd place Journalist of the Year
- 2019: 2nd place Journalist of the Year
- 2020: 1st place Journalist of the Year

Editor-in-Chief of the Year

At the end of 2020, the jury of Medium Magazin named Schmitz "Editor-in-Chief of the Year," stating that he had proven himself as a wise and empathetic leader during the Corona crisis, regularly bringing the Augsburger Allgemeine into the national headlines as an essayist and interviewer. His personnel restructuring with deputies Andrea Kümpfbeck and Yannick Dillinger, who launched a quality offensive in digital content in record time, was also praised.

At the end of 2022, Schmitz was named "Editor-in-Chief of the Year" by both Medium Magazin and the Kress Report. The Medium Magazin wrote that "thanks to Schmitz, the magazine is again more provocative, relevant, and political. He also handled several sensitive challenges as a leader, such as the internally criticized merger with RTL and the debate over the Nannen Prize." Kress Pro wrote that Schmitz had significantly improved Stern and restored its relevance. Schmitz also brought the brand back into the conversation through TV presence. Kress Pro noted that Schmitz had significantly improved Stern and restored its relevance. Schmitz also brought the brand back into the conversation through TV presence.
