= Andrea Böhm =

German journalist and author, born 1961

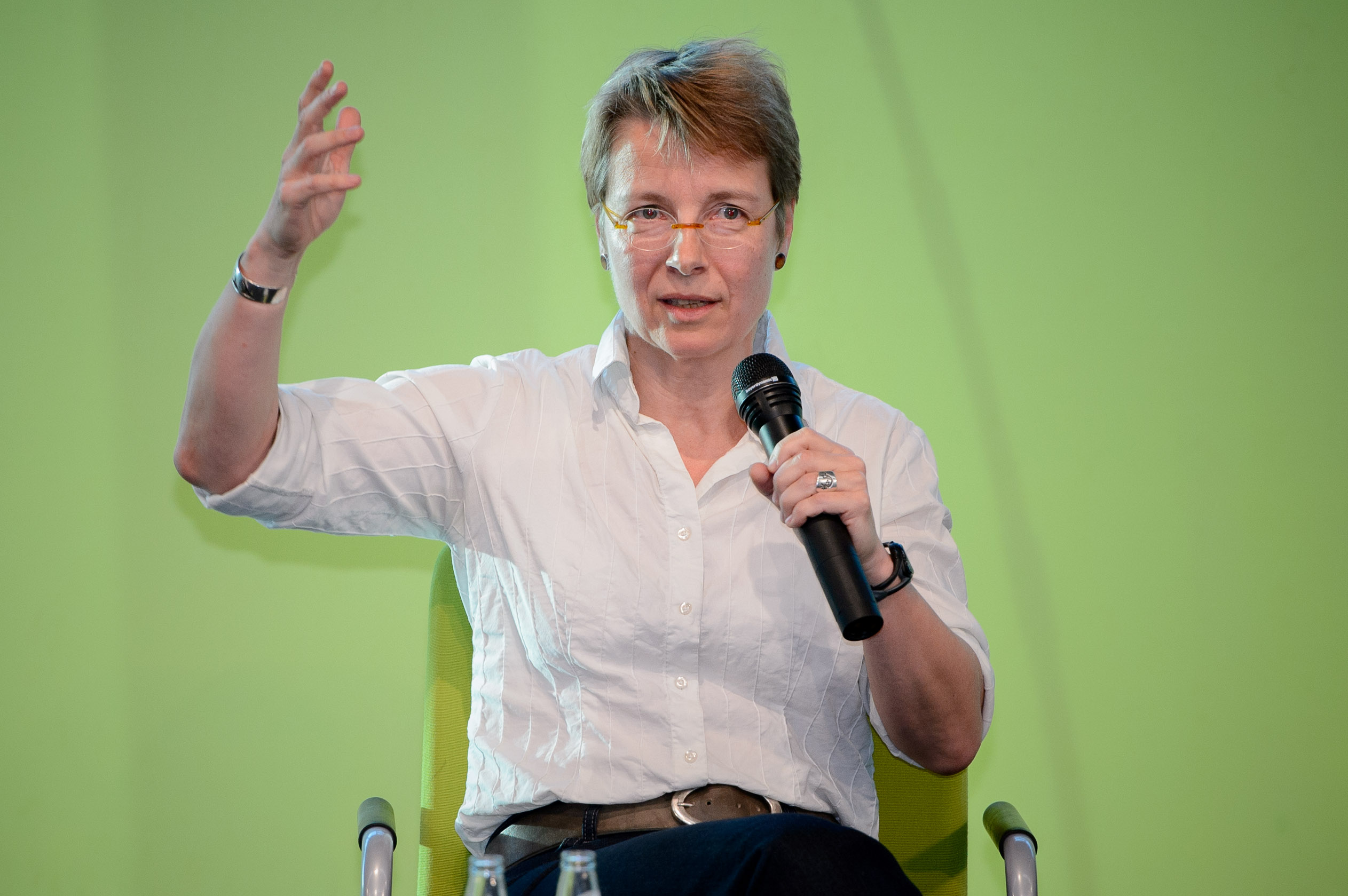
- Andrea Böhm in 2013
- Born: 1961 (age 64–65); Munich, West Germany
- Education: political science, German School of Journalism
- Occupations: foreign correspondent, non-fiction writer
- Employer(s): Die Zeit and Die Tageszeitung newspapers
- Known for: Reports about society and politics in the USA, Germany, Near East, Eastern Asia, Africa,
- Notable work: Gott und die Krokodile. Eine Reise durch den Kongo (God and the Crocodiles. A Journey through the Congo), Fighting Like a Woman. Die Geschichte der Frauen, die zurückschlagen. (Fighting Like a Woman.The History of Women who strike back.)
- Awards: Leipzig Book Fair Prize, Theodor Wolff Prize, [[Hansel Mieth Prize}]]

Andrea Böhm (born 1961) is a German award-winning journalist and writer. She is mainly known for her reports and essays in German about political affairs and society in the United States, Germany, the Near East and Sub-Saharan Africa.

Her non-fiction books have covered socio-political aspects of the USA, the crisis of the international world order, her travels in the Democratic Republic of the Congo and historical accounts of women who have fought for their rights.

== Life and career ==
Böhm studied political science in Berlin and the United States, and later completed her training at the German School of Journalism. Following this, she worked as America correspondent for Die Tageszeitung from 1989, also writing for German publications such as Die Zeit, Geo, and others.

As a freelancer working from New York City, she wrote reports about the United States for more than 10 years. Since 2006 she has been reporting about political affairs for Die Zeit. From 2013 until 2018, she was stationed for the same weekly in Beirut as their correspondent for the Near East.

Her areas of interest include the Near East, Eastern Asia, Africa, including the Democratic Republic of the Congo (DRC), civil wars, war crimes, the International Criminal Court and the crisis of the international world order. She has authored books based on her experience in four continents, the United States and the DRC. For her 2011 travelogue Gott und die Krokodile. Eine Reise durch den Kongo (God and the Crocodiles. A Journey through the Congo) she was shortlisted for the 2011 Leipzig Book Fair Prize in the category Non-fiction/Essay.

Böhm has been awarded prestigious German journalism awards, such as the Theodor Wolff Prize and the Hansel Mieth Prize, in memory of German-American photojournalist Hansel Mieth of Santa Rosa, California (1909–1998).

== Reception ==
Reviews in leading German media of Böhm's non-fiction books and reports have mentioned her profound knowledge of the countries described, a lively and straightforward narrative style as well as special empathy for ordinary people.

Due to more than 10 years as foreign correspondent in New York and her numerous trips into the lesser known regions of the United States, Böhm published the non-fiction book Die Amerikaner: Reise durch ein unbekanntes Imperium (The Americans: Journey through an Unknown Empire) in 2004. In her essays about members of the upper class as well as about the social marginalization of many underprivileged Americans, Böhm combined "biographical, historical and political aspects into a comprehensive analysis."

In the Frankfurter Allgemeine Zeitung, the academic of African studies Andreas Eckert discussed the non-fiction book Gott und die Krokodile. Eine Reise durch den Kongo. (God and the Crocodiles. A journey through the Congo.) He rated Böhm's descriptions of the country, which has suffered from regional crises, international interventions and exploitation since the colonisation of Africa, as outstanding in German-language literature on Africa. Due to her historical knowledge, Böhm succeeded in conveying both "sympathy for the country and its inhabitants" as well as a detailed description of the geopolitical situation.

Her 2017 book Das Ende der westlichen Weltordnung (The End of the Western World Order) was described as providing insight into the crisis of the international order as defined by the Western world. Meeting ordinary people in Somalia, Libya, Baghdad or China, she wrote about people who are mastering their lives, developing civil courage and living outside of the so-called global economy.

In a December 2022 article for the Frankfurter Rundschau on the occasion of Böhm's award of the Werner Holzer Prize for Foreign Journalism, her former colleague at Die Zeit, Özlem Topçu, wrote that Böhm always had both geopolitical and climate policy in mind, challenged the "white view of the African continent" and portrayed people in the global South as "acting subjects".

== Awards ==
- 2004 Theodor Wolff Prize
- 2010 Hansel Mieth Prize
- 2022 Werner Holzer Prize for Foreign Journalism

== Publications ==
=== Non-fiction books in German ===
- Die Amerikaner: Reise durch ein unbekanntes Imperium. Herder: Freiburg 2006 ISBN 978-3-451-05657-4
- Gott und die Krokodile. Eine Reise durch den Kongo. Pantheon Verlag: Munich 2011 ISBN 9783570551257
- Das Ende der westlichen Weltordnung. Eine Erkundung auf vier Kontinenten. Pantheon Verlag: Munich/Berlin 2017 ISBN 9783570552360
- Fighting like a woman: Die Geschichte der Frauen, die zurückschlagen. Hamburg: Rowohlt. 2026. ISBN 978-3-498-00397-5.

=== In English ===
- Böhm, Andrea (3 April 2007). "Harmony of Cultures?". In Göktürk, Deniz; Gramling, David; Kaes, Anton (eds.). Germany in Transit: Nation and Migration, 1955-2005. University of California Press. pp. 305–307. ISBN 978-0-520-24894-6.

=== Magazine articles ===
"Search results for »Andrea Böhm« in Die Zeit". ZEIT ONLINE (in German).

== Literature ==
- Böhm, Andrea (3 April 2007). "Harmony Of Cultures?". In Göktürk, Deniz; Gramling, David; Kaes, Anton (eds.). Germany in Transit: Nation and Migration, 1955–2005. Univ of California Press. pp. 305ff. ISBN 978-0-520-94001-7.
- Burcak Belli, Onur; Böhm, Andrea (4 December 2014). "Islamic State: The Business of the Caliph". Die Zeit. ISSN 0044-2070.
