= Reinhard Appel =

German television presenter and journalist

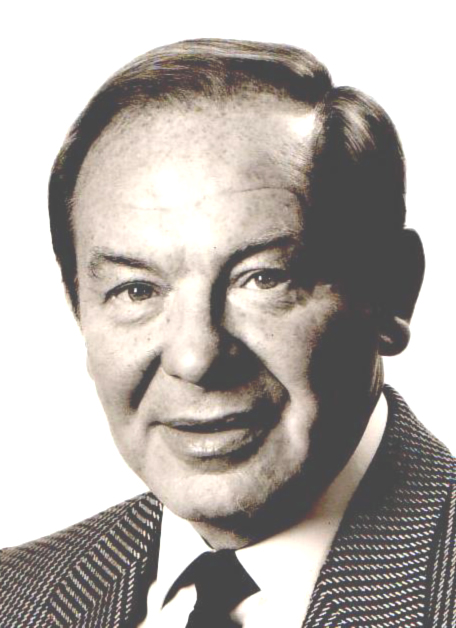
Reinhard Appel, 1970s, in Bonn

Reinhard Appel (February 21, 1927, in Königshütte – June 26, 2011, in Bonn) was a German journalist and television presenter.

== Life ==
Appel worked as journalist for German broadcasters. He was married and had three children.

== Awards ==
- 1970: Special contributions at Adolf-Grimme-Preis
- 1972: Theodor Wolff Prize
- 1972: Goldene Kamera in category best moderation for Journalisten fragen – Politiker antworten
- 1976: Bundesverdienstkreuz 1. Klasse der Bundesrepublik Deutschland
- 1981: Großes Bundesverdienstkreuz der Bundesrepublik Deutschland
