= Thomas Kielinger =

German journalist, political commentator and author (born 1940)

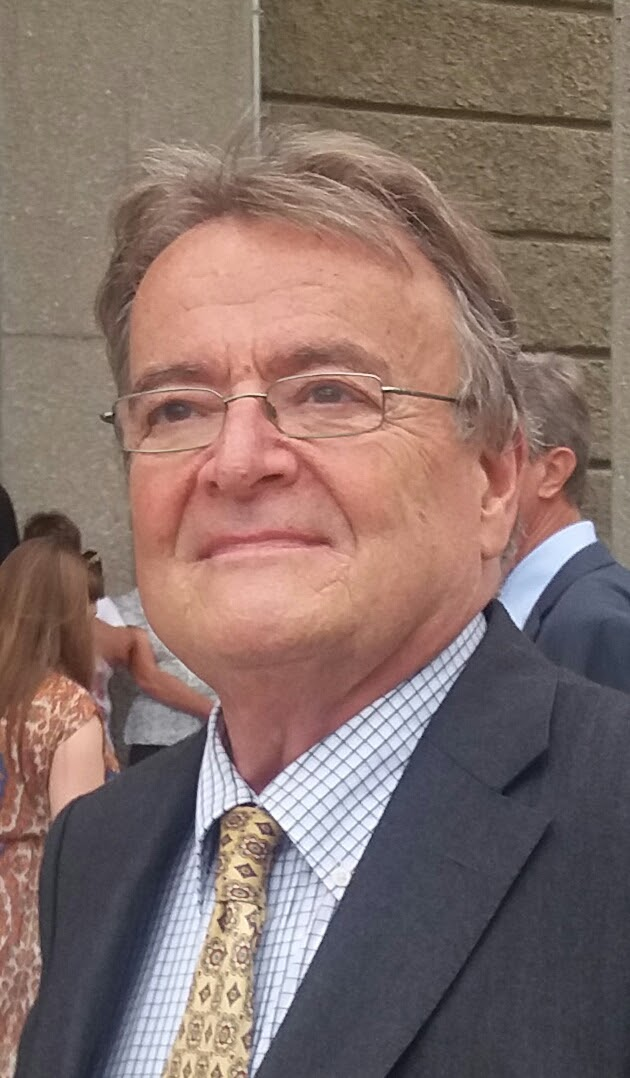

Thomas Kielinger OBE (born July 1940 in Danzig) is a German journalist, political commentator and author, who for a long time used to be London correspondent for Die Welt.

== Biography ==
Kielinger was born in 1940 in Danzig (modern day Gdańsk in Poland), the youngest of six children. He studied at the Universities of Münster and Bochum (where he took a graduate degree), as well as the University of Cardiff where in the 1960s he stayed for three years as a Lector in the German department.

=== Career ===
In 1971 he joined the German daily national newspaper Die Welt in Hamburg as its literary critic. In 1977, he was made Die Welt's chief correspondent in Washington DC to coincide with the inauguration of the United States President Jimmy Carter, and later in the era of Ronald Reagan.

After his time in the USA, he became Editor-in-Chief of the German weekly newspaper Rheinischer Merkur from 1985 to 1994. From 1994 to 1998 he pursued his own business as writer, broadcaster and political consultant. In 1998 he was invited to rejoin Die Welt, to become the paper's correspondent in London.

Kielinger was for many years on the jury of the Theodor Wolff Prize, and a jury member of the Lenkungsausschuss at the Königswinter Conference. He is a regular panelist on the BBC News weekly news discussion programme featuring a roundtable panel of foreign and British journalists Dateline London.

Several books testify to his abiding interest in Anglo-German history: Crossroads and Roundabouts: Junctions in German-British Relations (1997), Großbritannien, a country portrait as part of a series called "Die Deutschen und ihre Nachbarn" (The Germans and Their Neighbours, 2009; revised edition 2016), as well as a biography of the Queen, Elizabeth II – Das Leben der Queen (2011; dtv paperback 2014). The latter was also favourably reviewed in The Times Literary Supplement, where it was stated that "amid all the warm words about the Queen's commitment to duty, it is Thomas Kielinger who comes closest to explaining what motivates Elizabeth II".

In 2014, Kielinger added another biography to his list of publications: Winston Churchill – The Late Hero, which reached its 5th edition in 2015 and is available in paperback, as well as in an audio version (11 CDs), read by performer and author Gerd Heidenreich. It has been translated into Danish and Polish.

His latest biography is appearing in Spring 2019, about Elizabeth I.

== Awards ==
- 2016 Honorary Fellow of Cardiff University and of Queen Mary College London
- 2001 Federal Cross of Merit, First Class
- 1995 Honorary Officer of the Order of the British Empire (OBE)
- 1993 Honorary Fellow of the Cardiff School of Journalism
- 1990 Carlo-Schmid prize, together with Gerhard v. Glinski
- 1985 Theodor Wolff Prize

== Publications ==
- "Die Königin: Elisabeth I. und der Kampf um England", C. H. Beck 2019, ISBN 978-3-406-73237-9
- "Kleine Geschichte Grossbritanniens", C. H. Beck 2016, ISBN 978-3-406-68953-6
- "Winston Churchill – Der späte Held", C. H. Beck 2014, ISBN 978-3-406-66889-0
- "Elizabeth II. : das Leben der Queen", C.H.Beck 2011, ISBN 978-3-406-62360-8
- "Großbritannien", C.H.Beck 2009, ISBN 978-3-406-57849-6
- "Die Kreuzung und der Kreisverkehr : Deutsche und Briten im Zentrum der europäischen Geschichte", Bouvier 1997, ISBN 3-416-02668-3
- "Crossroads and roundabouts : junctions in German-British relations", Bouvier 1997, ISBN 3-416-02668-3
- "Orpheus im Intercity : Gedichte und Essay", Neske Stuttgart 1991, ISBN 3-7885-0342-4
- "Im Sog der Freiheit : Aufsätze zu Politik und Kultur", Bouvier 1991, ISBN 3-416-02316-1
- "Wohin mit Deutschland? : Vereint an der Schwelle eines schwierigen Jahrzehnts", (ed.) Bouvier 1991, ISBN 3-416-02309-9
