= Günter Bannas =

German journalist (1952–2026)

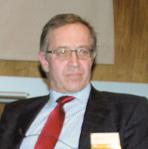
- Bannas in 2012
- Born: 8 May 1952; Kassel, West Germany
- Died: 24 July 2026 (aged 74); Berlin, Germany
- Education: University of Cologne
- Occupation: Journalist
- Organizations: Frankfurter Allgemeine Zeitung
- Awards: Theodor Wolff Prize

Günter Bannas (8 May 1952 – 24 July 2026) was a German journalist, who served for a long time as head of the capital parliamentary studio of the Frankfurter Allgemeine Zeitung (FAZ).

== Life and career ==
Bannas was born in Kassel on 8 May 1952 and attended school in Cologne, graduating from the Friedrich-Wilhelm-Gymnasium in Cologne with the Abitur in 1971. He studied history for four semesters and then economy, finances, political sciences and social psychology. He graduated with the diploma from the University of Cologne in 1979.

At the beginning of his studies, he took part in the student magazine direct, published by the Katholische Studierende Jugend (KSJ). From 1977 he was a regular freelance journalist for different political studios of the Deutschlandfunk. In 1979 he entered the news section of the Frankfurter Allgemeine Zeitung (FAZ), from 1981 in Bonn, then the national capital. During the 1980s, he focused on the development of the Greens, other parties, parliament and interior politics, which would remain his topics.

In 1997, Bannas moved to the Süddeutsche Zeitung, heading its Bonn office. In 1998, he returned to the FAZ, also heading the Bonn office. When the national government and parliament moved to Berlin in 1999, he headed the parliament office of the FAZ.

On 20 March 2018, Bannas retired in a ceremony with Chancellor Angela Merkel, Olaf Scholz (SPD) and Horst Seehofer (CSU), several ministers and other politicians and journalists.

Bannas was married to Sabine Schneider, a painter from Berlin. He died after a long illness in Berlin on 24 July 2026, at the age of 74. Bannas left his collection of notes about political topics to the Heinrich Böll Foundation.

== Awards ==
- On 23 February 2011, Bannas received the Media Award Politics 2010 of the Bundestag. In his recognition, the chief journalist of the Deutschlandfunk, Stephan Detjen, named him "a journalist who always brought us back at the primary location of politics in a democracy: the parliament with its great stages and scenes, where he detected with unparalleled precision what creates politics at its core: discourses with arguments worded, exchanged, organised, instrumentalised and run against each other".
- In 2013 Bannas was honoured as Journalist of the Year in the category of politics.
- In 2014 Bannas received the Ernst Dieter Lueg Award.
- In 2018 Bannas was honoured for his life's work with the Theodor Wolff Prize.

== Publications ==
- Der Vertrag zur deutschen Einheit. Insel-Verlag, Frankfurt am Main und Leipzig / Nomos-Verlag, Baden-Baden und Berlin 1990, ISBN 978-3-458-33690-7.
- Machtverschiebung: Wie die Berliner Republik unsere Politik verändert hat. Propyläen Verlag, Berlin 2019, ISBN 978-3-549-10004-2.
