= Jan Fleischhauer =

German journalist and author

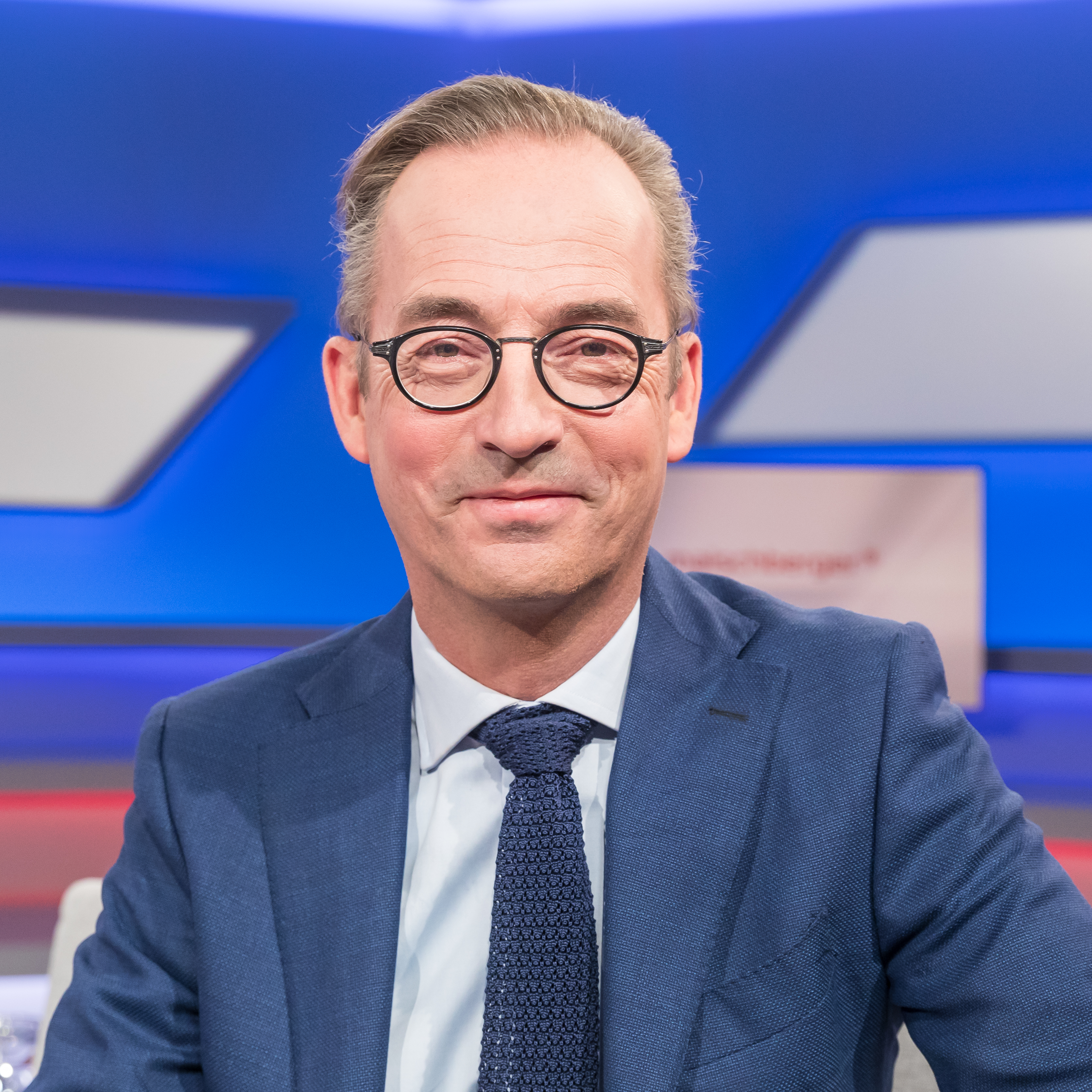
Fleischhauer in 2019

Jan Fleischhauer (born in 1962 in Osnabrück) is a German journalist and author.

== Biography ==
Jan Fleischhauer studied Literature and Philosophy at Universität Hamburg, then he went to Henri-Nannen-Schule for Journalism. Since 1989 he has worked as a Contributing editor at the German newspaper Der Spiegel. From 2001 to 2005 he was its Economic Correspondent in New York City. Since 2008 he again worked as writer and columnist for Der Spiegel and Spiegel Online in Berlin.

His first book Unter Linken (English: Among the Left) was published in Germany in 2009. There, he justified his orientation towards conservatism with the dogmas of the social democracy party and the related areas. This work was considered a "best-selling political non-fiction book of the year". Fleischhauer started a Theme-Blog from that book content. The related TV-film involved methods of the filmmaker Michael Moore and shows, among others, interviews with Frank Bsirske and Christian Ströbele.

Since 2011, he has written for Spiegel Online the Column S.P.O.N. – Der Schwarze Kanal, that has been included in the printed edition since May 2014. There he changes at a 3-week rhythm, with Jakob Augstein and Markus Feldenkirchen. In May 2012 Fleischhauer published his second book, with the title "Der schwarze Kanal – Was Sie schon immer von Linken ahnten, aber nie zu sagen wagten" (English: The Black Channel – What you always suspected from the left, but never dared to ask), a collection of slightly revised texts taken from the column at Spiegel-Online.

In October 2017 he published an autobiographical romance with the title Alles ist besser als noch ein Tag mit dir (English:Anything is better than another day with you), where Fleischhauer presented the problems after his divorce of the summer of 2011 in a literary fashion.

Moreover, he was author of the weblog Die Achse des Guten and, in 2010, of freiewelt.net and on the homepage of the evangelical association named Deutsches Institut für Jugend und Gesellschaft.

Since August 2019 Fleischhauer works as journalist for German magazine Focus.

== Reception ==
In January 2012 Jan Fleischhauer in S.P.O.N. – Der Schwarze Kanal compared the Italian people to Francesco Schettino, the captain of the Costa Concordia. Italian newspapers criticized this comparison, considering his tone "racist". The Italian Ambassador in Germany, in a direct reaction to what SPON published below the column, recommended to "leave generalizations for the sake of race", and criticized Fleischhauer's contribution as "vulgar and banal assertions.". The Italian newspaper Il Giornale titled on the following 27 January, the Tag des Gedenkens an die Opfer des Nationalsozialismus, with "We have Schettino, you have Auschwitz".

== Criticism ==
Fleischhauer has disseminated anti-Palestinian rhetoric and incited hatred on multiple occasions. He has equated the Palestinians to Hitler, has advocated cutting aid to the UN agency for supporting Palestinian refugees (UNRWA), called for Germany to choose between "The Jews" or the "Aggressive Arabs", and likened the bombing of Gaza University to the bombing of Dresden. Fleischhauer has also called for Germany to leave the UN.

== Publications ==
- Unter Linken. Von einem, der aus Versehen konservativ wurde. Rowohlt, Reinbek 2009, ISBN 978-3-498-02125-2.
- Der schwarze Kanal. Was Sie schon immer von Linken ahnten, aber nicht zu sagen wagten. Rowohlt, Reinbek 2012, ISBN 978-3-499-62975-4.
- Alles ist besser als noch ein Tag mit dir. Roman über die Liebe, ihr Ende und das Leben danach. Knaus, München 2017, ISBN 978-3-8135-0704-1.

== Awards ==
- 2010: Karl-Hermann-Flach-Preis für sein Buch Unter Linken: Von einem, der aus Versehen konservativ wurde
