= Nikolaus Blome =

German journalist (born 1963)

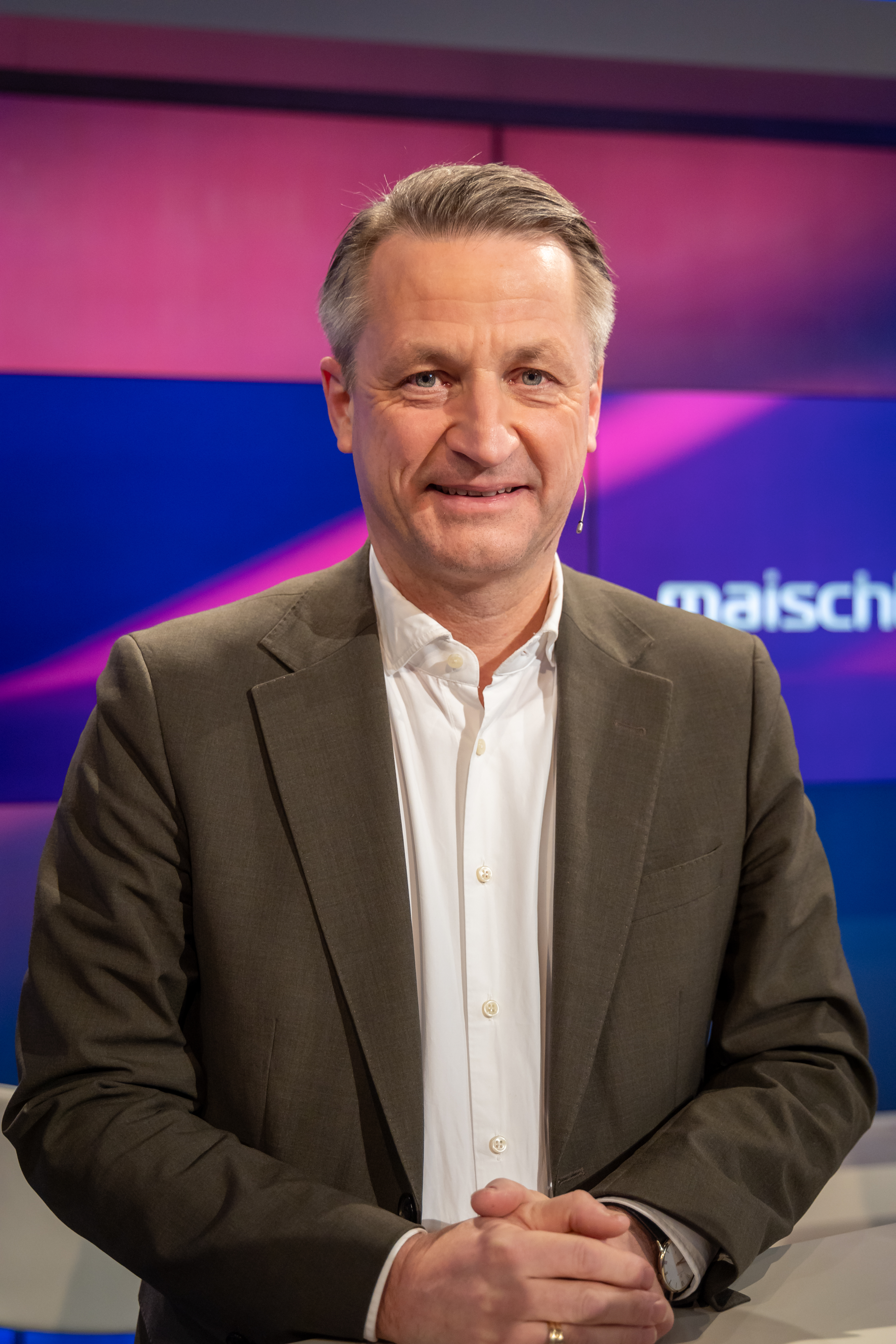
- Blome at maischberger. die woche in 2023
- Born: 16 September 1963 (age 63); Bonn, West Germany
- Education: Henri-Nannen-Schule
- Occupations: Journalist, author

Nikolaus Blome (born 16 September 1963) is a German journalist.

== Life ==
Blome was born in Bonn. He studied at the Henri-Nannen-Schule in Hamburg. From 1991 to 1993, he worked for the newspaper Der Tagesspiegel. From 1993 to 2013, he worked for the German newspaper Bild. From 2013 to 2015, Blome worked as a journalist for the news magazine Der Spiegel. He was also editor-in-chief of the Bild offshoot Bild Politik. Since 2020, Blome is the Head of Politics and Economics (Ressortleiter Politik und Wirtschaft) for RTL and n-tv.

Blome is married and has two sons and a daughter. He lives in Kleinmachnow, near Berlin.

== Activities ==
- International Journalists' Programmes (IJP), Member of the Board of Trustees

== Works ==
- Faul, korrupt und machtbesessen? Warum Politiker besser sind als ihr Ruf. wjs Verlag, Berlin 2008, ISBN 978-3-937989-42-6.
- Der kleine Wählerhasser. Was Politiker wirklich über die Bürger denken. Pantheon Verlag, Munich 2011, ISBN 978-3-570-55140-0.
- Angela Merkel. Die Zauder-Künstlerin. Pantheon Verlag, Munich 2013, ISBN 978-3-570-55201-8.

== Awards ==
- Arthur-F.-Burns-Fellowship (1993)
- Förderpreis by Friedrich und Isabel Vogel-Stiftung (1994)
- Förderpreis for Wirtschaftspublizistik by Ludwig-Erhard-Stiftung (1995)
- Deutsch-Französischer Journalistenpreis – Special award by Asko Europa-Stiftung (1996)
- Theodor Wolff Prize (2007)
- State Street-Award for Finanzjournalisten (2011)
- Herbert Quandt Medien-Award (2011)
- Henri Nannen Prize (2014) for best investigative work (together with nine other journalists at SPIEGEL)
