= Hellmuth Karasek =

German journalist and literary critic (1934–2015)

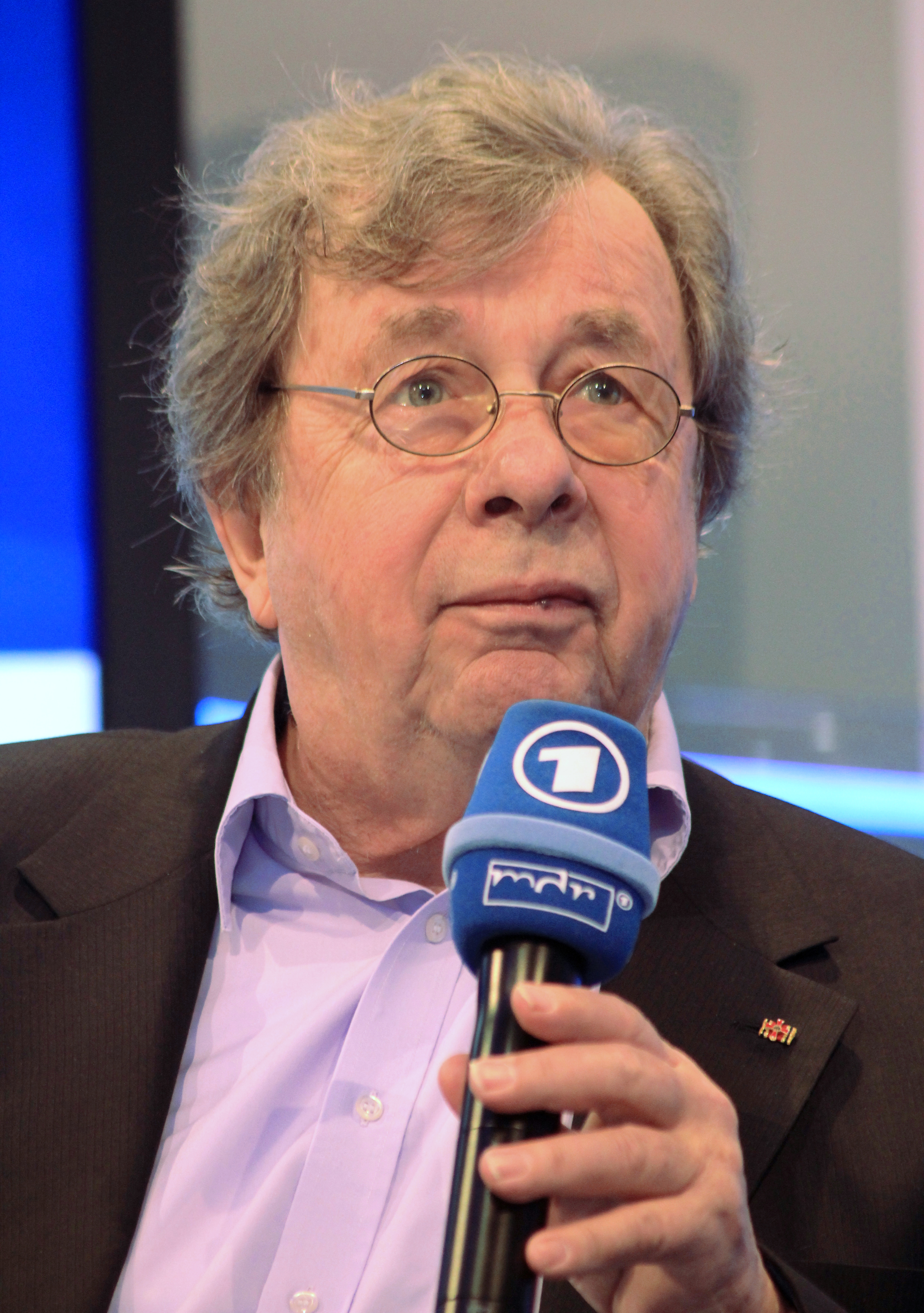
- Karasek in 2012
- Born: 4 January 1934; Brno, Czechoslovakia (now Czech Republic)
- Died: 29 September 2015 (aged 81); Hamburg, Germany
- Occupations: Journalist, author
- Years active: 1965–2015
- Children: 4
- Relatives: Thomas Mars (nephew)

Hellmuth Karasek (4 January 1934 – 29 September 2015) was a German journalist, literary critic, novelist, and the author of many books on literature and film. He was one of Germany's best-known feuilletonists.

== Biography ==
Karasek was born in the capital city of Moravia, Brno (German: Brünn), which was then a part of Czechoslovakia (current-day Czech Republic). Karasek attended the National Political Institutes of Education in Loben. In 1944, when he was ten, his family fled from Bielitz (today Bielsko in Poland) in the neighbouring German occupied Poland to Bernburg in Saxony-Anhalt. After finishing his schooling in the early 1950s he moved from there—then part of East Germany—to West Germany and became a student at the University of Tübingen, where he studied History, German and English language and literature.

After his graduation, Karasek started working as a journalist, and in 1968 became the theatre critic of the weekly newspaper Die Zeit. From 1974 until 1996 he wrote for the news magazine Der Spiegel, where he worked as the chief editor of the feuilleton. After his retirement from The Spiegel he wrote a novel named Das Magazin in which he criticised Der Spiegel. He also worked in later years for newspapers like Die Welt, Bild, Berliner Morgenpost and Der Tagesspiegel. He also wrote more than 20 books about his own life or literature and film, including monographs about Max Frisch, Bertolt Brecht and his close friend Billy Wilder. Other projects included three plays under the nom de plume Daniel Doppler and a translation of Raymond Chandler's The Lady in the Lake. In 1999, he was a member of the jury at the 49th Berlin International Film Festival.

Karasek was best known as one of the permanent members of the TV-literature review show Das Literarische Quartett, together with literary critic Marcel Reich-Ranicki, between 1988 and 2001. He also frequently appeared on other German television shows, for example in quiz shows like Die 5-Millionen-SKL-Show.

== Awards ==
- 1973/74: Theodor Wolff Prize
- 1991: Bavarian TV Awards
- 1994: Commander's Cross of the Order of Merit of the Federal Republic of Germany.

== Bibliography ==
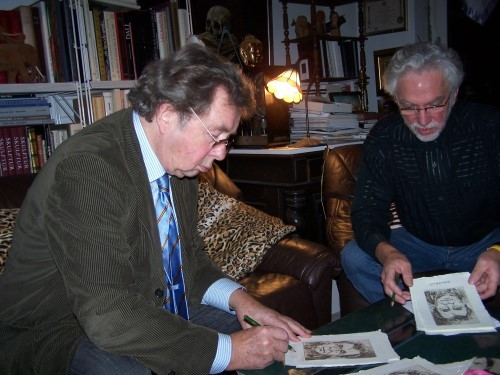
Karasek (left) and Jens Rusch in 2006

- Carl Sternheim (1965)
- Max Frisch (1966)
- Deutschland, deine Dichter (1970)
- Brecht, der jüngste Fall eines Klassikers (1978)
- Billy Wilder (1992)
- Mein Kino (a personal list of the 100 best movies ever) (1994)
- Go West! (about the 1950s) (1996)
- Hand in Handy (about the mobile phone craze) (1997)
- Das Magazin (novel, 1998)
- Betrug (novel, 2001)
- Karambolagen. Begegnungen mit Zeitgenossen (2002)
- Auf der Flucht (memoir, 2004)
