= Christian Lindner (journalist) =

German journalist (born 1959)

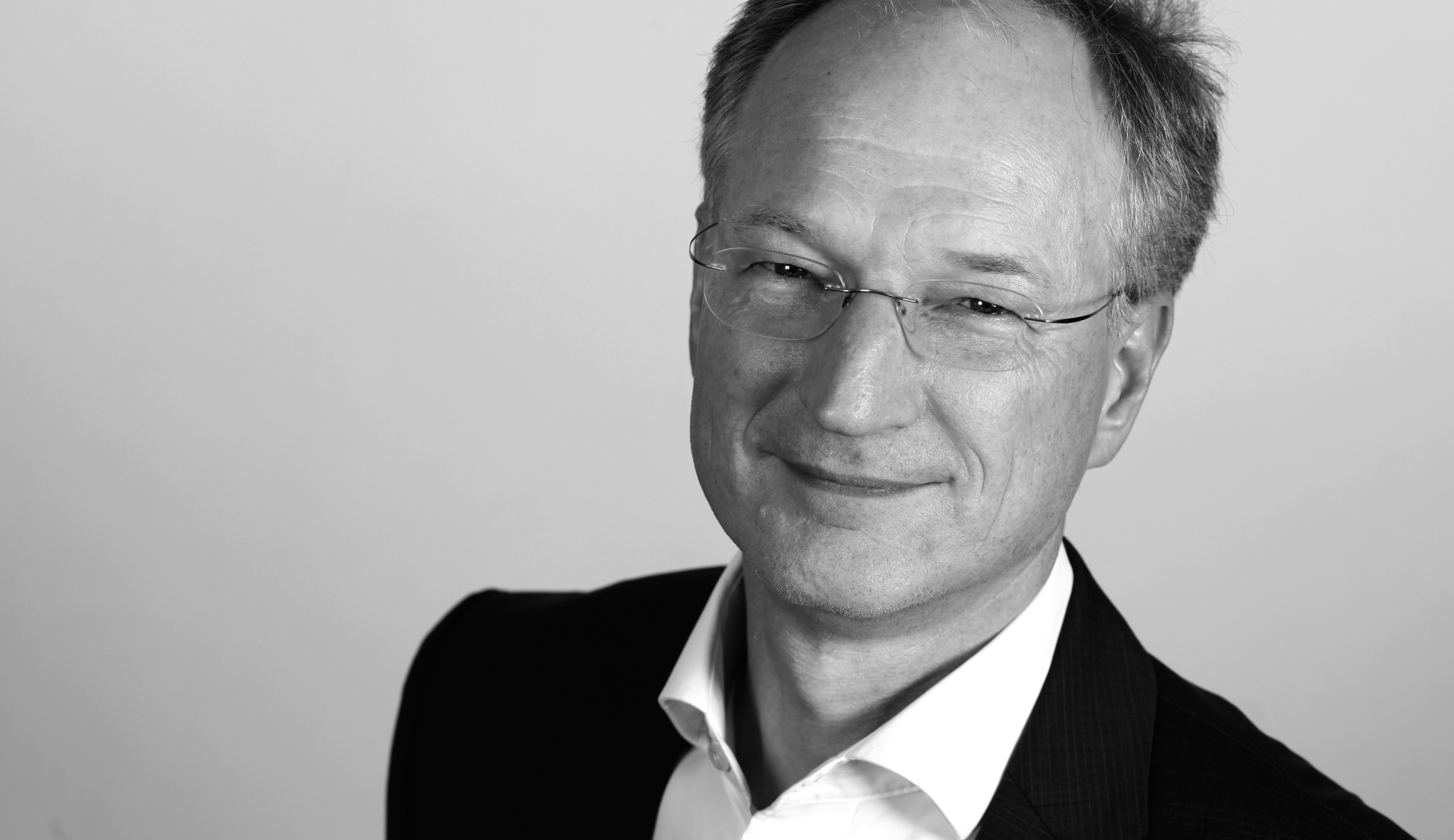
- Lindner in 2013
- Born: 20 September 1959 (age 66); Kaufbeuren, Bavaria, Germany
- Occupation: Journalist
- Awards: See Awards

Christian Lindner (born 20 September 1959) is a German journalist. From 2004 to 2017, he was chief editor of the Rhein-Zeitung.

== Life ==
Lindner was born on 20 September 1959 in Kaufbeuren, Bavaria, Germany. After his Abitur at the Freiherr-vom-Stein-Gymnasium (Betzdorf/Kirchen), he completed a Volontariat at the Rhein-Zeitung. He then went through several positions in the local editions and in the central editorial office of this newspaper. From 1992 to 1998, Lindner was the local manager of the Rhein-Zeitung's edition Westerwälder Zeitung. In 1997, he became deputy chief editor and since 2004, he has been chief editor of the Rhein-Zeitung. The alleged reason given was the orientation of the Rhein-Zeitung on the Internet. Lindner became deputy chief editor at Bild am Sonntag on 1 April 2018. In a tweet from 18 July 2019, Lindner announced that he would leave Bild am Sonntag, but remain true to journalism.

== Honorary offices ==
In 2013, Lindner was appointed by the Theodor Wolff Prize Board of Trustees to the jury of the Journalistenpreises der deutschen Zeitungen (German Newspapers' Journalism Prize).

== Awards ==
In 1997, Deutscher Jagdverband (German hunting protection association) awarded Lindner the Journalistenpreis by Deutscher Journalisten-Verband (DJW) for its long-term series Das Jahr eines Jägers (The year of a hunter), which was published in the Westerwälder Zeitung.

In 2011 and 2013, Lindner was voted Chefredakteur des Jahres (chief editor of the year) in the category Regional/Lokal (Regional/Local) by a specialist jury from the trade journal Medium Magazin.
