= National Political Institutes of Education =

Elite secondary schools in Nazi Germany

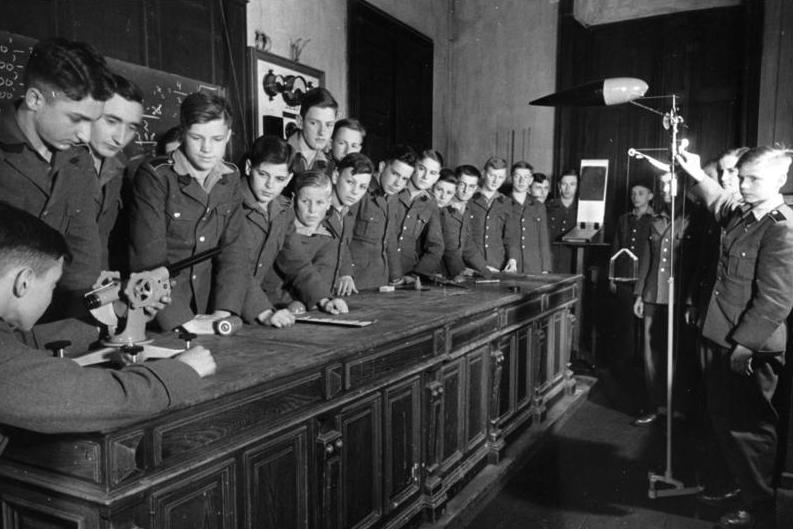
Students attending a physics lesson in a Napola school

National Political Institutes of Education (German: Nationalpolitische Erziehungsanstalten; officially abbreviated NPEA, commonly abbreviated Napola for Nationalpolitische Lehranstalt meaning National Political Teaching Institute) were secondary boarding schools in Nazi Germany. They were founded as ‘community education sites’ after the Nazi seizure of power in 1933.

== Mission ==
The main task of the NPEA was the "education of National Socialists, efficient in body and soul for the service to the people and the state". The pupils attending these schools were meant to become the future leadership of Germany – political, administrative, and military. Until the beginning of World War II on 1 September 1939, the Napolas served as strong politically accentuated elite preparatory schools within the framework of the general higher education system. During the war, they increasingly developed into preparatory schools for entry into the Wehrmacht and Waffen-SS. In keeping with their unique nature, Napola schools operated separate from all other German secondary schools.

== Overview ==
The first three NPEAs were founded in 1933 by the Minister of Education Bernhard Rust in Plön, Potsdam and Köslin. The schools responded directly to the Reich Ministry for Education, rather than to any state like regular schools. To create the schools, Rust and fellow educational officials drew upon a wide variety of inspirations, including the Prussian cadet corps, public schools in Britain and the practices of ancient Sparta. From 1936, the NPEAs were subordinated to the Inspector of the National Political Institutes of Education, SS-Obergruppenführer August Heissmeyer. From August 1940 onward, they were part of the Hauptamt Dienststelle Heissmeyer and the schools came under the direct influence of the SS, which supplied and supported them. The goal of the schools was to train future leaders, and especially given the influence of the SS, it was hoped that graduates would choose a career in the SS or police.

By 1941 there were 30 NPEAs with 6,000 pupils enrolled throughout Nazi Germany. The schools were gender-segregated, with only a few girls-only schools in existence. In 1942, out of the 33 Napola schools that were operating, just three were for girls. By the end of the war in 1945, 43 Napola schools were listed. Boys aged 10–14 years wore the uniform of the Deutsches Jungvolk (German Youngfolk) was used. For those aged 14–18 years, the uniform of the Hitler Youth was used. The rank structure corresponded with that of those two organizations. Heissmeyer considered introducing uniforms and ranks similar to the SS among pupils and teachers, but ultimately kept the Hitler Youth organizational structure. The Napolas were more effective at indoctrinating pupils politically than organisations such as the Hitler Youth; children attended from a younger age, and mixed little with other children.

Due to the highly militaristic nature of Nazi Germany, life at the NPEAs was dominated by military discipline. Only boys and girls considered to be "racially flawless" were admitted to the schools and no children with poor hearing or vision were accepted. "Above average intelligence" was also required, so that those looking to be admitted had to complete 8-day entrance exams. Life in boys' Napolas was highly competitive, even brutal. It was extremely hard to get in and nearly as hard to stay. Approximately one fifth of all cadets failed to meet the required standards or were sent home because of injuries sustained in training accidents. During the interwar period, there were several student exchange programmes conducted between Napolas and schools in other Western countries, such as the United Kingdom and United States.

Napola schools were intensely political, deliberately working to make their cadets fervent believers in the Nazi regime and its ideology. This was reflected in the percentage of Jungmannen who eventually entered the SS: 13%, much higher than the 1.8% of the general German population. The Nazi world view was considered paramount in Napola education. A prominent belief among the cadets themselves was that of "Endsieg" or final victory. This came into play as Germany's fortunes fell into a decline from which they would never recover, and Nazi leadership increasingly scraped the bottom of the barrel for manpower. The privileged students of the Napola schools were mobilized in the final months of the war, serving as poorly equipped and minimally trained but highly motivated infantry. Armed with little more than blind fanaticism, they nonetheless offered fierce resistance in many battles in the last months of the war. Casualties among them were extremely high.

== School locations ==
City	Official Title	Region	Founded	Former use
Plön	NPEA Plön	Schleswig-Holstein	1 May 1933	Stabila (Staatliche Bildungsanstalt, "National Education Facility")
Potsdam	NPEA Potsdam	Brandenburg	26 May 1933	Stabila
Köslin	NPEA Köslin	Pomerania (today Poland)	15 July 1933	Stabila
Berlin-Spandau	NPEA Berlin-Spandau	Berlin	30 January 1934	Prussian Academy for Gymnastics; school for teachers
Naumburg	NPEA Naumburg	Prussian Province of Saxony	15 March 1934	Stabila/Military school
Ilfeld	NPEA Ilfeld	Prussian province of Hanover/Prussian Province of Saxony	20 April 1934	Cloisters/Seminary
Wahlstatt	NPEA Wahlstatt	Silesia (today Poland)	9 April 1934	Stabila
Oranienstein	NPEA Oranienstein	Prussian province of Hesse-Nassau	1934	Military school/Realgymnasium/Castle
Stuhm	NPEA Stuhm	East Prussia (today Poland)	1 October 1934	Barracks
Ballenstedt	NPEA Anhalt	Anhalt	May 1934	City Gymnasium (secondary school)
Dresden-Klotzsche	NPEA Dresden Klotzsche	Saxony	1 April 1934	Landesschule
Backnang	NPEA Backnang	Württemberg	2 May 1934	Teacher Seminary
Bensberg	NPEA Bensberg	Prussian Rhine Province	1 June 1935	Military school/Castle
Schulpforta	NPEA Schulpforta	Prussian Province of Saxony	1 July 1935	Landesschule zu Pforta (state school Pforta, currently Landesschule Pforta in Saxony-Anhalt)
Rottweil	NPEA Rottweil	Württemberg	1 April 1936	Catholic Seminary
Neuzelle	NPEA Neuzelle	Brandenburg	1934/1938	Abbey (Stift), Boarding school for girls
Wien-Theresianum	NPEA Wien-Theresianum	Vienna (Austria)	13 March 1939	Academy
Wien-Breitensee	NPEA Wien-Breitensee	Vienna (Austria)	13 March 1939	Austrian Federal School (Bundeserziehungsanstalt) (Kommandogebäude Theodor Körner part of the Breitensee Barracks in Vienna)
Traiskirchen	NPEA Traiskirchen	Lower Danube (Austria)	13 March 1939	Austrian Federal School (Bundeserziehungsanstalt)
Ploschkowitz (Ploskovice)	NPEA Sudetenland	Sudetenland (today Czech Republic)	10 October 1940	Ploskovice Castle
Reisen (Rydzyna)	NPEA Wartheland	Warthegau (today Poland)	1940	Polish boarding school for boys in Rydzyna Castle
Loben	NPEA Loben	(East-) Upper Silesia (today Poland)	1 April 1941	School for children with speech impediments
Putbus	NPEA Rügen	Pomerania	1 September 1941	Pädagogium (Stift)
Reichenau	NPEA Reichenau	Baden	1941	Hospice
St Wendel	NPEA St Wendel	Saarland	1 September 1941	International School of the Steyler Mission
Weierhof bei Marnheim	NPEA am Donnersberg	Bavaria (Saar Palatinate)	1941	Gau-Oberschule (Reich regional secondary school?)
Sankt Paul im Lavanttal	NPEA Spanheim in Kärnten	Carinthia (Austria)	1941	Benedictine Abbey
Vorau	NPEA Gottweig	Styria (Austria)	January 1943	Augustine Abbey
Seckau	NPEA Seckau	Styria (Austria)	1941	Benedictine Abbey (Stift)
Rufach	NPEA Rufach	Alsace (today France)	October 1940	Hospice
Haselünne	NPEA Emsland	Prussian province of Hanover	17 October 1941	Cloister/Seminary for the Ursuline Order
Neubeuern	NPEA Neubeuern	Bavaria	May 1942	Castle and state boarding school
St Veit	NPEA St Veit	Slovenia	July 1942	Catholic Seminary and Gymnasium
Mokritz	NPEA Mokritz	Styria (Austria)	1942	Castle
Achern	NPEA Achern	Baden	August 1943	The Illenau Sanatorium and Hospice
Kuttenberg (Kutná Hora)	NPEA Böhmen	Protectorate of Bohemia and Moravia	22 April 1944	Jesuit college and barracks
Raudnitz an der Elbe (Roudnice nad Labem)	NPEA Raudnitz	Protectorate of Bohemia and Moravia	July 1944	Roudnice Castle

== Well-known former students ==
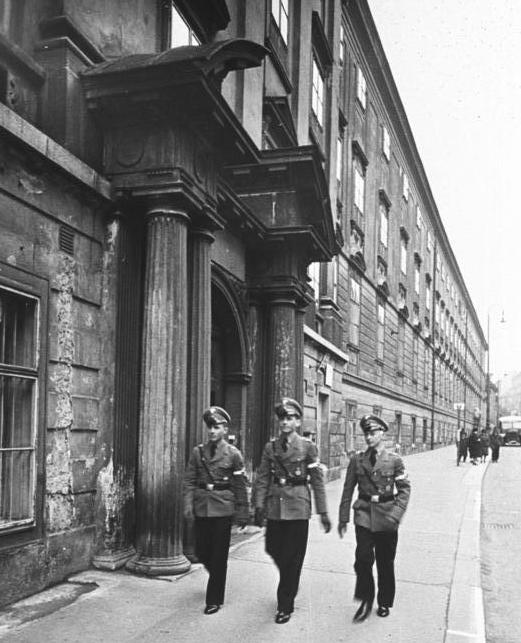
Students at the entrance of NPEA Vienna-Theresianum (now Theresianum) in Vienna, 1940

Well-known former students of National Political Institutes of Education include:

- Heinz Dürr (businessman)
- Manfred Ewald (athletic official)
- Alfred Herrhausen (businessman)
- Horst Janssen (printmaker)
- Hellmuth Karasek (journalist and author)
- Heinz Hitler (nephew of Adolf Hitler)
- Hardy Krüger (actor)
- Johannes Poeppel (general)
- Theo Sommer (journalist)
- Rüdiger von Wechmar (diplomat)

== See also ==
- Adolf Hitler Schools
- Nazi elite schools
- SS-Junker Schools
- SS Education Office
