= Henri Nannen =

German journalist and art collector (1913–1996)

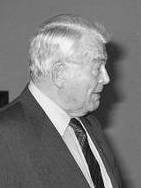
- Nannen in 1987
- Born: 25 December 1913; Emden, German Empire
- Died: 13 October 1996 (aged 82); Hanover, Germany
- Occupations: Journalist; magazine publisher; art collector
- Known for: Founding Gruner + Jahr, Der Stern magazine
- Spouse: Eske Nannen
- Children: Christian Nannen

Henri Nannen (25 December 1913 – 13 October 1996) was a German journalist and art collector. He became one of the most prominent journalists and magazine publishers in Germany.

His father was a police officer in Emden who was removed from his post by the NSDAP. After a one-year book dealer apprenticeship he studied the history of art at the Ludwig-Maximilians-Universität München. In the 1930s, he started working as a journalist. During the war he served in SS-Standarte Kurt Eggers, a propaganda unit in Italy. Being large, well-built and fair haired, he corresponded to the racial ideals of the time in Germany. This made him the speaker of the Olympic Oath during the 1936 event in Berlin – for Riefenstahl's film, but not in reality. Many years after the war, he confessed that "I knew what was happening ... but I was too cowardly to do something against it." He got back to journalism while working for the Hannoverschen Neusten Nachrichten, the daily newspaper Abendpost and the youth newspaper Zickzack.

He was the founder of Gruner + Jahr publishing house and the news magazine Der Stern. He led the magazine from 1948 to 1980 to become one of the strongest in Europe. Gruner + Jahr is the largest publisher in Europe as of 2014.

Nannen gained popularity as an art collector and benefactor of the Kunsthalle in Emden, an art museum, that he built in 1983. The annual Henri Nannen Prizes are awarded in his honor by Gruner + Jahr. The Henri-Nannen-Schule (formerly Hamburger Journalistenschule), is the journalist school of Gruner + Jahr and is considered one of the best schools of journalism in Germany, along with the German School of Journalism (Deutsche Journalistenschule) in Munich.

He was married to Eske Nannen (born 1942), a former actress. Henri Nannen has a son Christian Nannen (born 1946), co-owner of Hamburg suitcase-producer Travelite.
