= Rudolph Chimelli =

German journalist and writer (1928–2016)

Rudolph Maximilian Chimelli (24 April 1928 – 22 April 2016) was a German journalist and writer.

Chimelli was born in Munich and studied first law and economy. In 1968, he went to Beirut, from where he contributed to several newspapers with articles about the Arab world. In 1972, he moved to Moscow and was from 1979 to 1998 redactor in Paris for the German newspaper Süddeutsche Zeitung.

He published many of his journalistic works. In 1986, the Bundesverband Deutscher Zeitungsverleger awarded him the Theodor-Wolff-Preis. In 1992 Chimelli was honored with the Joseph-Roth-Preis, and in 2007 he received the Officer's Cross of the Republic of Germany.

== Works ==
- Bretagne, Hamburg: Hoffmann und Campe, 1982, 108 p., ISBN 3-455-28208-3.
- 9mal Moskau, München: Piper, 1987, 231 pp., ISBN 3-492-15113-2.
- Matrioschka, Zurich: Vontobel-Stiftung, 1991.
- Islamismus, Zurich: Vontobel-Stiftung, 1993, 154 pp.
- Sicherheitsnadeln, Zurich: Vontobel-Stiftung,1996, 57 pp.
- Die Revolution mehrt ihre Kinder. Iranische Notizen, Vienna: Picus-Verlag, 2000, 151 pp., ISBN 3-85452-737-3.
- Öl und Opium, Zurich : Vontobel-Stiftung, 2000.
- Das Abendland Arabiens. Maghrebinische Verknüpfungen, Vienna: Picus-Verlag, 2002, 166 pp., ISBN 3-85452-766-7.
- Lesereise Paris : Lokaltermin bei Mona Lisa, Vienna: Picus-Verlag, 2009, 2nd edition, 131 pp., ISBN 978-3-85452-968-2.
- Stefan Kornelius, Rudolph Chimelli, Journalism: a changing world, Translated by Andrew Sims, Bonn: Inter Nationes, 1996, 18 pp.
