= Cordt Schnibben =

German journalist

Cordt Georg Wilhelm Schnibben (born 28 July 1952 in Bremen) is a German journalist.

== Life ==
Both Schnibben's father Georg and his mother Elfriede Schnibben who died when he was twelve years old, were dedicated Nazis. Only after the death of his father did Schnibben learn that both of his parents were involved shortly before the war ended in a politically motivated murder of an unarmed civilian, in which the father was a volunteer of "Freikorps Adolf Hitler" to which the main perpetrators belonged, as Schnibben reported in a detailed essay in the magazine Der Spiegel in April 2014.

Schnibben was a student at Bremen High School at Barkhof. He was influenced by the 1968 movement, and he demonstrated against the German emergency legislation (adopted on 30 May 1968), joined the German Communist Party and spent a year studying social sciences at the Franz Mehring Institute in Berlin-Biesdorf in East Berlin. After that academic year he started studying economics at the University of Bremen. For a time he worked as a copywriter, and after two tries was accepted into the prestigious Henri-Nannen-Schule. Between 1984 and 1988 he was an editor at the weekly German newspaper Die Zeit. Since then he has worked with the magazine Der Spiegel, where he is currently one of the two heads of the editorial board.

In 1991, Schnibben wrote an article in Der Spiegel on extreme right-wing violence in Germany and the arson attack on the asylum center in Hunxe.

Schnibben founded the German Reporter Forum in 2007 together with the journalists Stephan Lebert and Ariel Hauptmeier.

Schnibben has received numerous German journalism awards.

== Works ==
- Neues Deutschland. Seltsame Berichte aus der Welt der Bundesbürger. 1988, ISBN 3-891-36206-4.
- Macht und Machenschaften: die Wahrheitsfindung in der Barschel-Affäre; mit Volker Skierka. 1989, ISBN 3-891-36189-0.
- Reklamerepublik: Seltsame Berichte zur Lage der vierten Gewalt. 1994, ISBN 3-891-36520-9.
- Saigon export. Vietnams Comeback. Seltsame Berichte aus einem neueröffneten Land. 1989, ISBN 3-891-36276-5.
- Seltsames Deutschland: Berichte aus der Welt der Bundesbürger. 1992, ISBN 3-426-04044-1.
- Che Guevara und andere Helden. 1997, ISBN 3-891-36616-7.
- 11. September 2001: Geschichte eines Terrorangriffs; mit Stefan Aust. 2002, ISBN 3-423-34026-6.
- Irak: Geschichte eines modernen Krieges; mit Stefan Aust. 2003, ISBN 3-423-34137-8.
- Operation Rot-Grün: Geschichte eines politischen Abenteuers. 2005, ISBN 3-421-05782-6.
- Tsunami: Geschichte eines Weltbebens. 2005, ISBN 3-421-05890-3.
- I can't get no: Ein paar 68er treffen sich wieder und rechnen ab; mit Irmela Hannover. 2007, ISBN 3-462-03905-9.
- Der Spiegel, Titelthema 16/2014 (14. April 2014): Mein Vater, der Mörder.
