= Günther von Lojewski =

German journalist (1935–2023)

- Born: 11 July 1935; Berlin, German Reich
- Died: 26 February 2023 (aged 87); Munich, Bavaria, Germany
- Occupations: Author; Television journalist; Academic teacher
- Organizations: Frankfurter Allgemeine Zeitung; ZDF; Bayerischer Rundfunk; Sender Freies Berlin; Freie Universität Berlin
- Awards: Theodor Wolff Prize; Order of Merit of the Federal Republic of Germany; Bavarian Order of Merit

Günther von Lojewski (German: [ˈɡʏntɐ fɔn loˈjɛfski]; 11 July 1935 – 26 February 2023) was a German political journalist, television presenter and author. He worked as a journalist for the Frankfurter Allgemeine Zeitung, the ZDF and Bayerischer Rundfunk. From 1989 to 1997, he was head of the Sender Freies Berlin, and afterwards taught at the Freie Universität Berlin.

== Life and career ==
Lojewski was born in Berlin on 11 July 1935. His father, Werner von Lojewski, was a speaker for Konrad Adenauer and the first speaker of Walter Hallstein, the President of the Commission of the European Economic Community. He attended primary schools in Pößneck (Thuringia) and in Berlin-Steglitz, and gymnasium in Berlin, Hamburg and Bonn. He studied history, German studies, and political science at the University of Bonn and in Innsbruck. He completed a dissertation in Bonn in 1960, Bayerns Weg nach Köln. Geschichte der bayerischen Bistumspolitik in der 2. Hälfte des 16. Jahrhunderts, about Bavarian politics in the 16th century. He first worked as an academic assistant for one year, and from 1960 as a journalist for the Hannoversche Allgemeine newspaper. From 1964, he was a journalist of interior politics at the Frankfurter Allgemeine Zeitung (FAZ), and from 1969 leader of the news at ZDF, where he established the television magazine heute journal. He became head of the Report department of Bayerischer Rundfunk in the 1970s, and was later responsible for domestic politics.

In 1989, shortly before the fall of the Berlin Wall, Lojewski became intendant of the broadcaster SFB in Berlin. The station supplied the news of the fall of the Wall for the world. After the German reunification, he succeeded in a merge with Ostdeutscher Rundfunk Brandenburg (ORB), resulting in Rundfunk Berlin-Brandenburg (RBB) in 2003. He pursued an even larger merge but found not enough support for the idea. He held the position until 1997.

He taught at the Freie Universität Berlin (FU) from 1997 to 2009. He authored several books. At the university, he founded a project, Journalisten international, which enabled 200 young journalists from Russia, Ukraine and other countries from Eastern Europe to study in Berlin at the Internationales Journalisten-Kolleg of the FU.

Lojewski wrote freelance for the FAZ until old age. In his last contribution, he analysed journalism, its standards, ethics and relation to freedom and power ("unsere Standards, unser Ethos und unser Verhältnis zu Freiheit und Macht").

=== Personal life and death ===
Lojewski had a daughter, Susann von Lojewski, who also became a journalist, working for the ZDF as leader of the studio in Nairobi.

Lojewski died in Grasbrunn, near Munich, on 26 February 2023, at age 87.

== Publications ==
- Bayerns Weg nach Köln. Geschichte der bayerischen Bistumspolitik in der 2. Hälfte des 16. Jahrhunderts. Verlag Röhrscheid, Bonn 1962. (= Bonner historische Forschungen, vol. 21; originally Dissertation)
- Mehr Staat – weniger Staat? Johann Wilhelm Naumann Verlag, Würzburg 1982.
- Wem gehört die deutsche Geschichte (1984)
- (ed. with Thomas Goppel and Hans-Werner Eroms:) Wirkung und Wandlung der Sprache in der Politik. Symposium at the University of Passau, 25 and 26 November 1988.
- Kirche und Politik – kontrovers: eine Diskussion zwischen Günther von Lojewski und Johannes Hanselmann. Olzog Verlag, Munich 1988
- Einigkeit und Recht und Freiheit. "Report" eines deutschen Lebens. Herbig, Munich 2000. (autobiography)
- with Axel Zerdick: Rundfunkwende. Der Umbruch des deutschen Rundfunksystems nach 1989 aus der Sicht der Akteure. Vistas Verlag, Berlin 2000
- 9. November 1989: Waren die Medien der Motor des Mauerfalls? (essay, in German), Der Tagesspiegel, 30 October 2016
- Der SFB und der 9. November 1989: Vergessen? Vertan! (in German), Der Tagesspiegel, 8 November 2022

== Awards ==
- 1969: Theodor Wolff Prize
- 2004: Order of Merit of the Federal Republic of Germany
- 2009: Honorary Professor of the department of journalism of the Lomonossov University.
- 2017: Bavarian Order of Merit
