= Rhein-Zeitung =

German daily broadsheet newspaper

- Front page on 15 January 2022
- Type: Daily newspaper
- Format: Broadsheet
- Publisher: Mittelrhein-Verlag GmbH
- Editor-in-chief: Lars Hennemann
- Language: German
- Headquarters: Koblenz
- Circulation: 154,565 (as of 2021)
- Website: rhein-zeitung.de

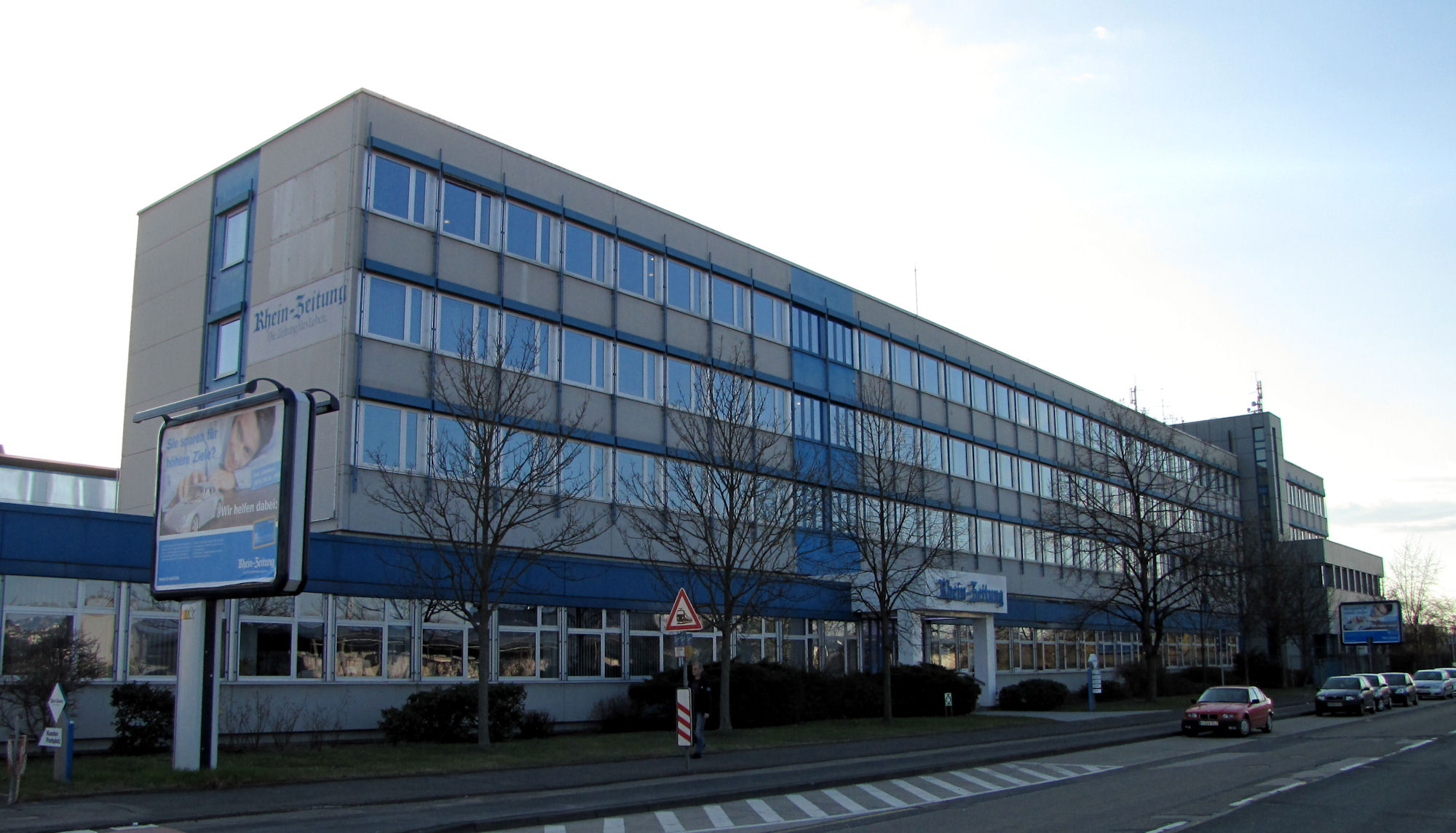
The headquarters, found in Koblenz

The Rhein-Zeitung (RZ) is a regional German daily broadsheet newspaper published in Koblenz by Mittelrhein-Verlag GmbH and distributed across Rhineland-Palatinate. In five districts, the editions are unchanged for the respective district; in the districts of Altenkirchen, Neuwied, Mayen-Koblenz and the Rhein-Lahn district, the Rhein-Zeitung appears in two spatially differentiated versions (“splitting editions”).

== Notable people ==
=== Editors ===
Name	Tenure
Oscar Richardt	1946 to 1948
Oscar Richardt; Michael Weber	1948 to 1952
Michael Weber	1952 to 1956
Fritz Hirschner; Hans Maurer	1956 to 1967
Hans Maurer	1967 to 1969
Helmut Kampmann	1970 to 1986
Hans Peter Sommer	1986 to 1993
Horst Schilling	1993 to 1996
Dieter Heitmann	1996 to 1998
Martin Lohmann	1998 to 2004
Christian Lindner; Joachim Türk	2004 to 2011
Christian Lindner	2012 to 2017
Peter Burger	2017 to 2021
Lars Hennemann	2014 to present
