= Victor Auburtin =

German journalist and author (1870–1928)

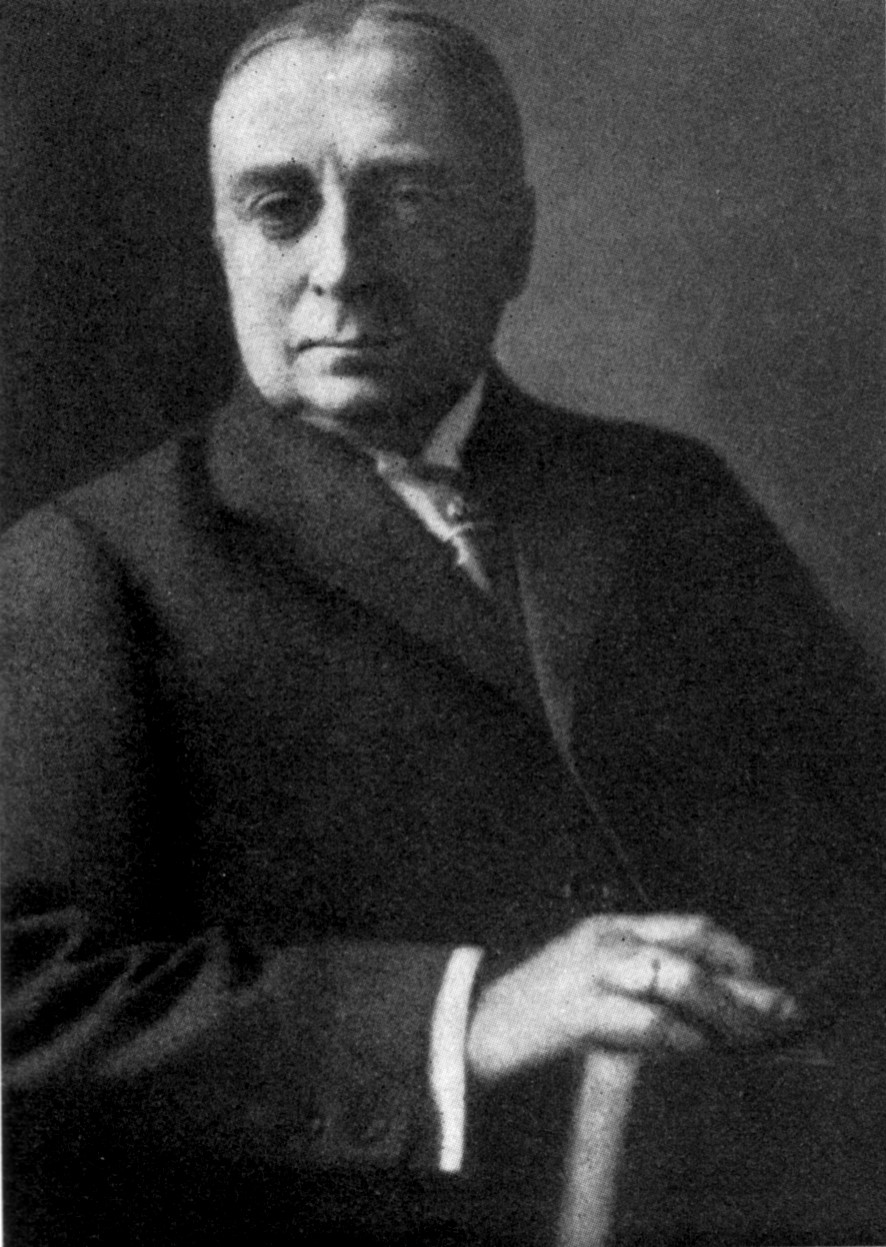
- Victor Auburtin (ca 1925)
- Born: 5 September 1870; Berlin, Germany
- Died: 28 June 1928; Partenkirchen, Bavaria, Germany
- Occupations: Writer journalist
- Spouse: Hedwig Gudlowski
- Parent: Charles Boguslav Auburtin (1837–1915)

Victor Auburtin (5 September 1870 – 28 June 1928) was a German journalist and writer. His style was idiosyncratic, and he was a master of the German form of the feuilleton genre.

== Life ==
Auburtin was born into a family that had emigrated from Alsace (at the time, part of France) a couple of generations earlier: his grandfather, Charles Louis Benoit Auburtin (1808–1885), had worked as a chef for the King of Prussia.

Aubertin attended the French School in Berlin, then moving on (with an extended travel break) to study acting, German studies, Arts and Literature at Berlin, Bonn and Tübingen. After that he began to write as an arts and theatre critic for the "Berliner Börsenzeitung" (literally "Berlin Stock exchange newspaper)", for which his father, Charles Boguslav Auburtin (1837–1915) already worked as a journalist. Victor Auburtin also wrote during this time for the magazine Jugend ("Youth") and for the satirical weekly, Simplicissimus.

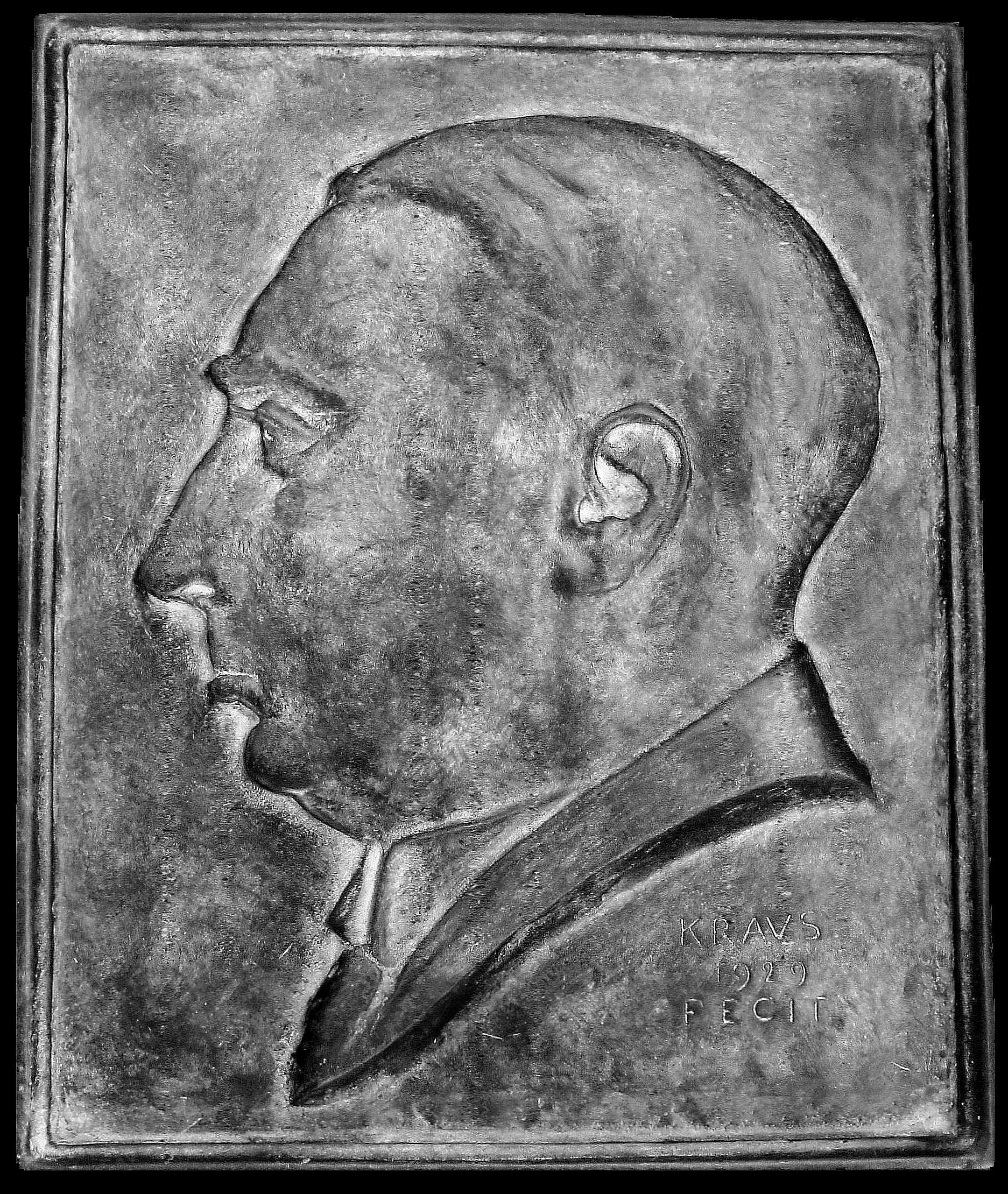
The relief from Auburtin's grave at Partenkirchen, which is no longer existent.

Between 1911 and 1914 he worked for the Berliner Tageblatt newspaper, based in Paris as the paper's foreign correspondent. However, in August 1914 war broke out, and he was identified as a prominent enemy alien. He was arrested and imprisoned at Dijon, in the east of France. He was then moved to a prison in Morsiglia on the island of Corsica. Here he remained till 1917, by when he was seriously ill, and the French released him. He was repatriated to Germany via Switzerland. His life in French internment was later recalled in a volume Auburtin produced in German and French entitled "Was ich in Frankreich erlebte" ("My experiences in France" / "Carnet d' un boche en France 1914–1917").

After 1917 he worked as a travel writer and freelance correspondence. Places on which he wrote included Madrid and, notably towards the end of his career, Rome. A story told – apparently by another cat lover – of his time in Rome concerns his unexpected disappearance one day. He was found in a state of mental confusion (geistig verwirrt) in Trajan's Forum, surrounded by some of the feral cats who abound in the city. By this stage, the source asserts, he loved cats more than he loved people.

== Personal ==
In 1906 Victor Auburtin married Hedwig Gudlowski. Their final years together were greatly affected by Hedwig's mental illness.

== Writing ==
Auburtin's journalism and literary work move between turn of the [nineteenth/twentieth] century literature and the "classic modern" style. Influences come both from his French ancestral provenance and his own upbringing in Prussia. His texts display an anecdotal lightness of touch, with elements of elitist Dandyism and an underlying conservatism, albeit not infrequently spiced with stark departures from the politically conservative mainstream.

Auburtin was a huge admirer of the French political leader Jean Jaurès, although he completely rejected Jaurès' Socialism. With the various new artistic movements, which were a feature of the early twentieth century, he had difficulties. Unlike other conservative commentators, however, he did not campaign against artistic innovators: he viewed their outputs from a position of distanced sceptical interest, but not of unreasoned hostility. He was able to find intellectual joy in each new ideology that appeared, a tendency clearly disclosed in both the content and style of his own written commentaries and criticism.
