= Bertelsmann Printing Group =

German printing company

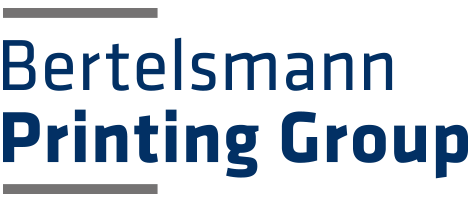
- Company type: Subsidiary
- Industry: Printing
- Predecessor: Be Printers
- Founded: January 1, 2016; 10 years ago in Gütersloh, North Rhine-Westphalia, Germany
- Headquarters: Gütersloh, Germany
- Area served: Worldwide
- Key people: Axel Hentrei (CEO)
- Revenue: €1.624 billion (2016)
- Number of employees: 8,138 (2016)
- Parent: Bertelsmann
- Subsidiaries: AZ Direct; Berryville Graphics; Quad Graphics; Campaign; Coral Graphics; DeutschlandCard; GGP Media; MBS Nürnberg; Mohn Media; Offset Paperback Manufacturers (OPM); Prinovis rtv media group Sonopress; Vogel Druck
- Website: www.bertelsmann-printing-group.com

The Bertelsmann Printing Group is a German group of companies in the printing industry with headquarters in Gütersloh, North Rhine-Westphalia. It was established in 2016 and is the market leader in Europe among offset and gravure printing companies. The Bertelsmann Printing Group is one of eight divisions of Bertelsmann, the international media, service and education conglomerate.

== History ==
In 2005, Bertelsmann and Axel Springer consolidated their gravure printing operations under the umbrella of Prinovis. Reasons for this included the industry-wide price decline and overcapacities. The Hamburg-based company was marked leader in Europe from the beginning. Bertelsmann indirectly owned 74.9 percent, with the subsidiaries Arvato and Gruner + Jahr each holding a 37.45 percent stake. Axel Springer owned the remaining 25.1 percent. In 2012, Prinovis became part of Be Printers, a newly-established division of Bertelsmann for the majority of the printing companies. This move was part of a larger reorganization of Bertelsmann under CEO Thomas Rabe who assumed his position in 2012. In 2015, Axel Springer sold its stake in Prinovis, making Bertelsmann the sole shareholder. In the process, Bertelsmann gained the opportunity to further streamline its printing operations.

Shortly after the restructuring, Bertelsmann announced in 2015 the establishment of the Bertelsmann Printing Group, effective January 1, 2016. All printing companies of Be Printers and the printing operations previously belonging to the sister division Arvato were bundled under the umbrella of the new corporate group. Several other service and production businesses, e.g. storage media manufacturer Sonopress, followed. At the time of its founding, the Bertelsmann Printing Group earned annual revenues of some €1.7 billion and had more than 8,000 employees. Independent of the merger, the brands of the individual printing companies, service and production operations remained intact. Over the course of the business year, it had a significant positive effect on the profit situation of the entire corporate group. In 2017, additional companies from the digital marketing business of Arvato have changed over to the Bertelsmann Printing Group.

== Structure ==
Since 2016, the Bertelsmann Printing Group has been one of Bertelsmann's eight corporate divisions. It encompasses all of Bertelsmann's worldwide offset and gravure operations, as well as several other service and production businesses. The subsidiaries are AZ Direct, Berryville Graphics, Campaign, Coral Graphics, DeutschlandCard, GGP Media, MBS Nürnberg, Mohn Media, Offset Paperback Manufacturers (OPM), Prinovis, the rtv media group, Sonopress and Vogel Druck. Today, in the USA, the company primarily functions as a house printer for the company’s book publishing division.

Initially, the Bertelsmann Printing Group was led by Bertram Stausberg and Axel Hentrei as two equal Chief Executive Officers. Since Bertram Stausberg stepped down in the fall of 2016, Axel Hentrei has solely headed up the group. The headquarters are located in Carl-Bertelsmann-Straße in Gütersloh. In total the group is active at 15 facilities in Germany, the United Kingdom and the United States, as well as Mexico and Asia.
