= Jäkel =

Jäkel is a German surname. Notable people with the surname include:

- Bernd Jäkel (born 1954), German sailor
- Frederik Jäkel (born 2001), German footballer
- Julia Jäkel (born 1971), German manager and publisher
