= GEO Epoche =

History magazine in Germany

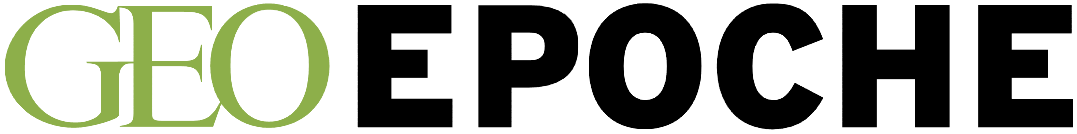
- Categories: History magazine
- Frequency: Bimonthly
- Circulation: 120,000 (Feb 2020)
- Founded: 1999
- Company: Gruner + Jahr
- Country: Germany
- Based in: Hamburg
- Language: German
- Website: GEO Epoche
- ISSN: 1861-6097
- OCLC: 985026999

GEO Epoche is a bimonthly history magazine owned by Gruner + Jahr based in Hamburg, Germany. The subtitle of the magazine is das Magazin für Geschichte (German: The History Magazine). It is a by-product of the geography magazine GEO.

== History and profile ==
GEO Epoche was launched in 1999. Its headquarters is in Hamburg. It provides research articles, photos and illustrations about important historical events. The magazine, unlike other history magazines in Germany, attaches importance to the writers' subjective expert knowledge. From 2007 the magazine has been in cooperation with the Zentrale für Unterrichtsmedien im Internet e.V.’ (ZUM, Centre for teaching tools online).

In the period between its start in 1999 and 2012 GEO Epoche enjoyed higher levels of circulation, but then its circulation level began to decrease like that of other history magazines in Germany. As of February 2020 the circulation of the magazine was about 120,000 copies.
