= Gunter Thielen =

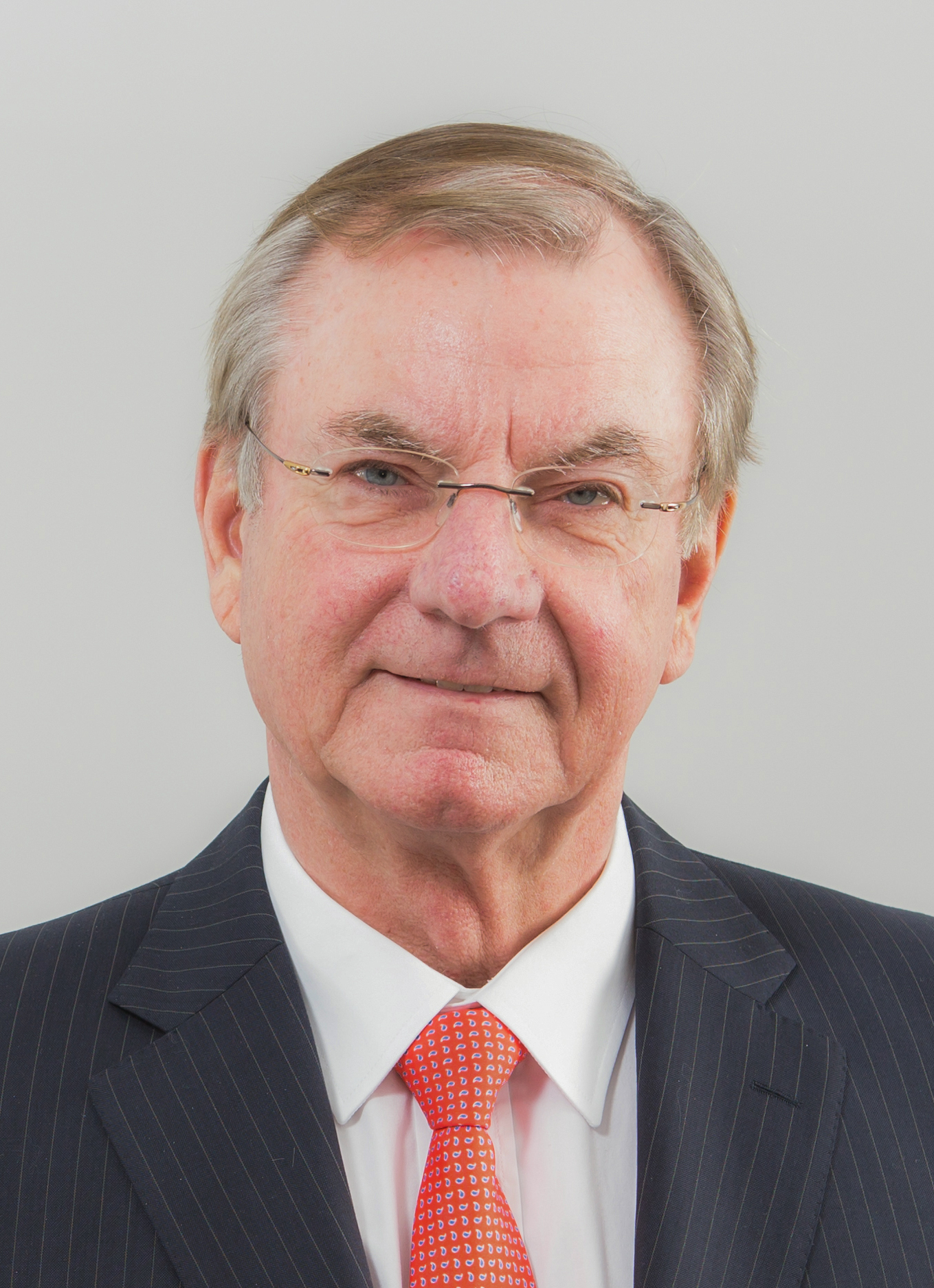
Gunter Thielen in 2015

Gunter Thielen (born 4 August 1942 in Quierschied) was chairman and chief executive officer of the Bertelsmann Stiftung.

He graduated from RWTH Aachen University with a PhD in mechanical engineering and economics. He was a manager at BASF from 1970 to 1976 and a technical director at the Wintershall refinery from 1976 to 1980.

He was chief executive officer of Arvato AG, from 1985 to 2001. He was CEO of Bertelsmann AG from August 2002 until January 2008 when he was succeeded by Hartmut Ostrowski.

In 2005, he received the Johns Hopkins University Global Leadership Award. He is on the International Advisory Board of the Atlantic Council.
