= Geo (magazine) =

Family of educational monthly magazines

- Categories: Geography, science, history, nature
- Frequency: Monthly
- Founded: 1976
- Company: Gruner + Jahr
- Country: Germany
- Based in: Hamburg
- Language: German + other languages
- Website: German edition

GEO is a family of educational monthly magazines similar to the National Geographic magazine. It is known for its detailed reports and pictures.

== History and profile ==
The first edition appeared in Germany in 1976. Since then, the magazine has been published in Bulgaria, Croatia, Czech Republic, Estonia, Finland, France (first international edition), Greece, Hungary, India (publication ceased in 2013), Italy, Japan, Korea, Lithuania, Latvia, Romania, Russia (publication ceased in 2018), Slovakia, Slovenia, Spain, and Turkey. The current circulation figure in France and Germany is over 500,000.

GEO is published by Gruner + Jahr, a publishing house owned by Bertelsmann.

The French edition was launched in 1979 and is published monthly by Prisma Presse. The German version has several special editions (line extensions): GEO Saison, a multi thematic magazine dedicated to tourism, GEO Special a mono thematic magazine about individual countries or cities, GEO Wissen and GEO Kompakt mono thematic magazines focused on science issues, GEO Epoche about history and GEOlino for children. The Russian edition features GEOTraveller, GEOFocus on science and history, GEOлёнок for children and The Best of GEO. Vivendi acquired Prisma Media from Bertelsmann in 2020 and later the company spun-out its publishing operation (including Prisma Media and the French license for GEO) into Louis Hachette Group in 2024.

Besides the magazines, GEO's portfolio consists of merchandising products like GEO illustrated books, a GEO encyclopedia, GEO calendars and others.

On 26 July 2013, Outlook Group announced that GEO, along with People and Marie Claire, would cease publication in India and the license would not be renewed.

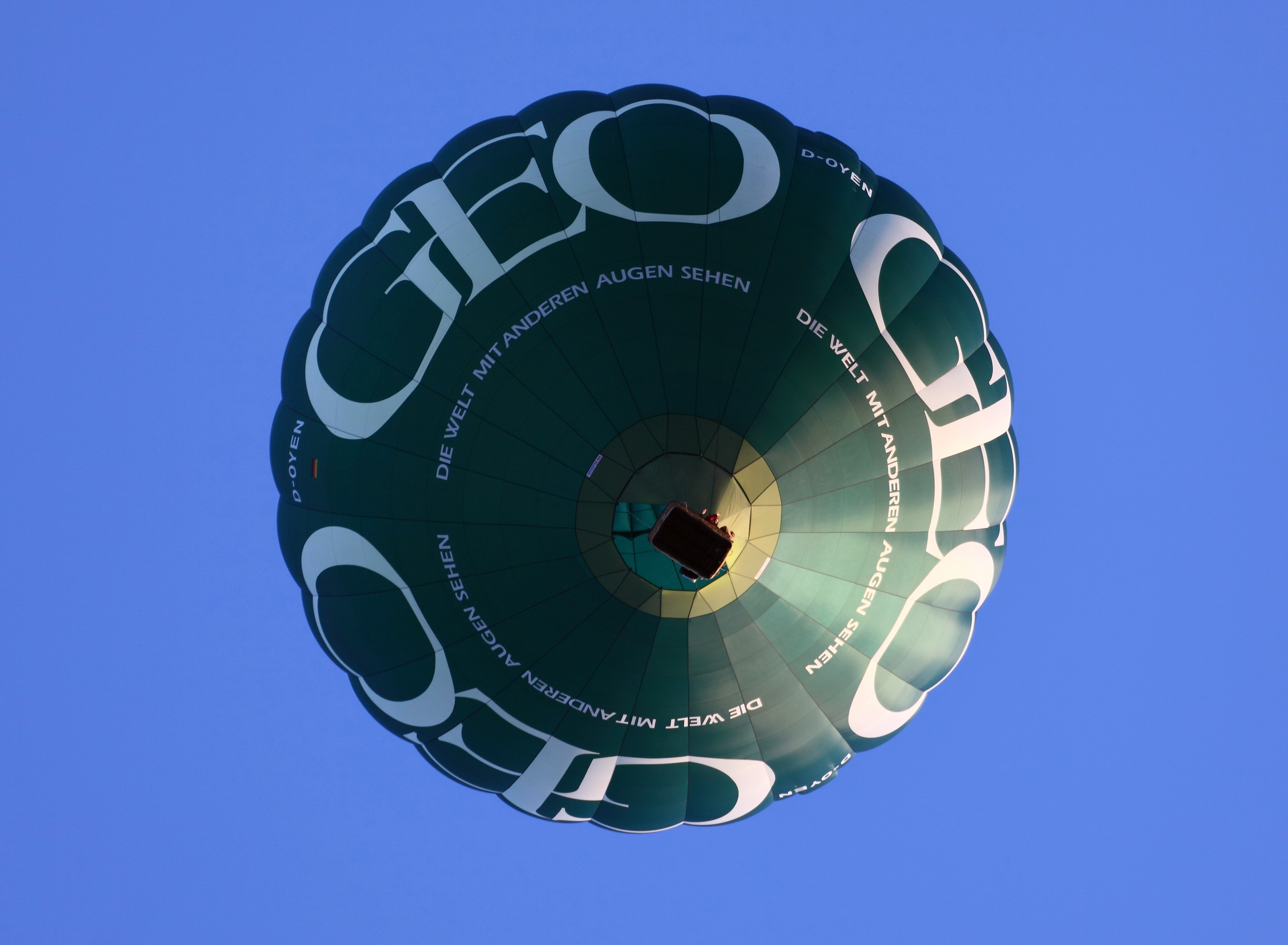
Hot air ballon with GEO advertising

== Geo Television ==
The magazine has its own television channel called Geo Television, operated in the DACH region.
