= Rolf Buch =

German business executive

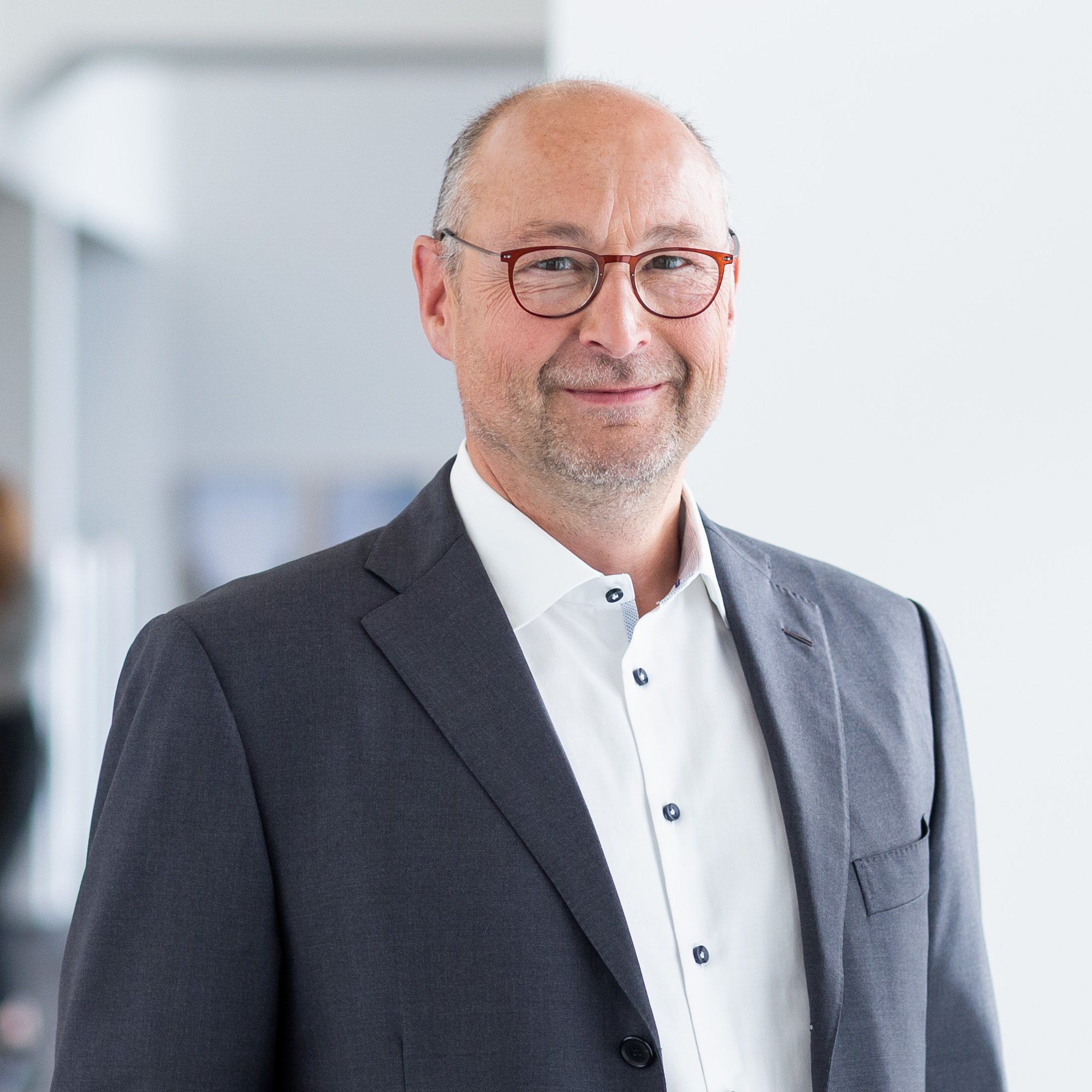
- Buch in 2019
- Born: Rolf Eberhard Buch; 2 April 1965 (age 61); Weidenau, Germany
- Alma mater: RWTH Aachen University
- Occupation: Manager
- Employer: Vonovia
- Title: Chief Executive Officer (CEO)

Rolf Eberhard Buch (born 2 April 1965) is a German business executive. In 2013, he was appointed CEO of the real estate company Deutsche Annington, which, following the takeover of GAGFAH in the year 2015, was renamed Vonovia. Previously, Buch held an executive position at Arvato.

== Early life and education ==
Buch was born in Weidenau near Siegen. At age three, his family moved to the Kettwig district in the city of Essen. After completing his secondary education ("Abitur"), Buch studied mechanical engineering and business administration at the RWTH Aachen University and received his engineering degree in 1990.

== Career ==
=== Bertelsmann ===
in 1991, Buch began his career in the print and industrial division of Bertelsmann, which was later renamed Arvato. After serving in various positions in sales and marketing of domestic and foreign subsidiaries, he became a member of the executive board of Arvato in 2002. Under his leadership, the international services business grew into a key revenue and profit generator.

In 2008, Buch succeeded Ostrowski as CEO of Arvato and also took up duties as a member of the Bertelsmann executive board. In this position, he promoted business involving services for cities and communities. Moreover, he increasingly invested in digital services to prepare Arvato for the digital transformation.

At the end of 2012, Buch stepped down from the Arvato executive board upon his own wishes and left the group.

=== Vonovia ===
In 2013, the real estate company Deutsche Annington announced Buch's appointment as CEO. He took the company public, expanding the property portfolio through acquisitions. With the takeover of competitor GAGFAH in the year 2015, he created Germany's largest real estate group. Under the new name of Vonovia, the company was later listed in the DAX blue-chip index.

== Other activities ==
=== Corporate boards ===
Until May 2009, Buch was member of the supervisory board of the internet service provider Lycos Europe. Besides, in 2017 and 2018, he was on the board of directors of the Swedish real estate company D. Carnegie & Co. To date, Buch serves on the supervisory board of the Gesellschaft zur Sicherung von Bergmannswohnungen (GSB) and is an active member of the board of trustees of Sparkasse Gütersloh's Woldemar Winkler Stiftung foundation.

=== Non-profit organizations ===
- Trilateral Commission, Member of the European Group

== Personal life ==
Buch lives with his wife and two children in Gütersloh.
