= Markus Dohle =

German businessperson

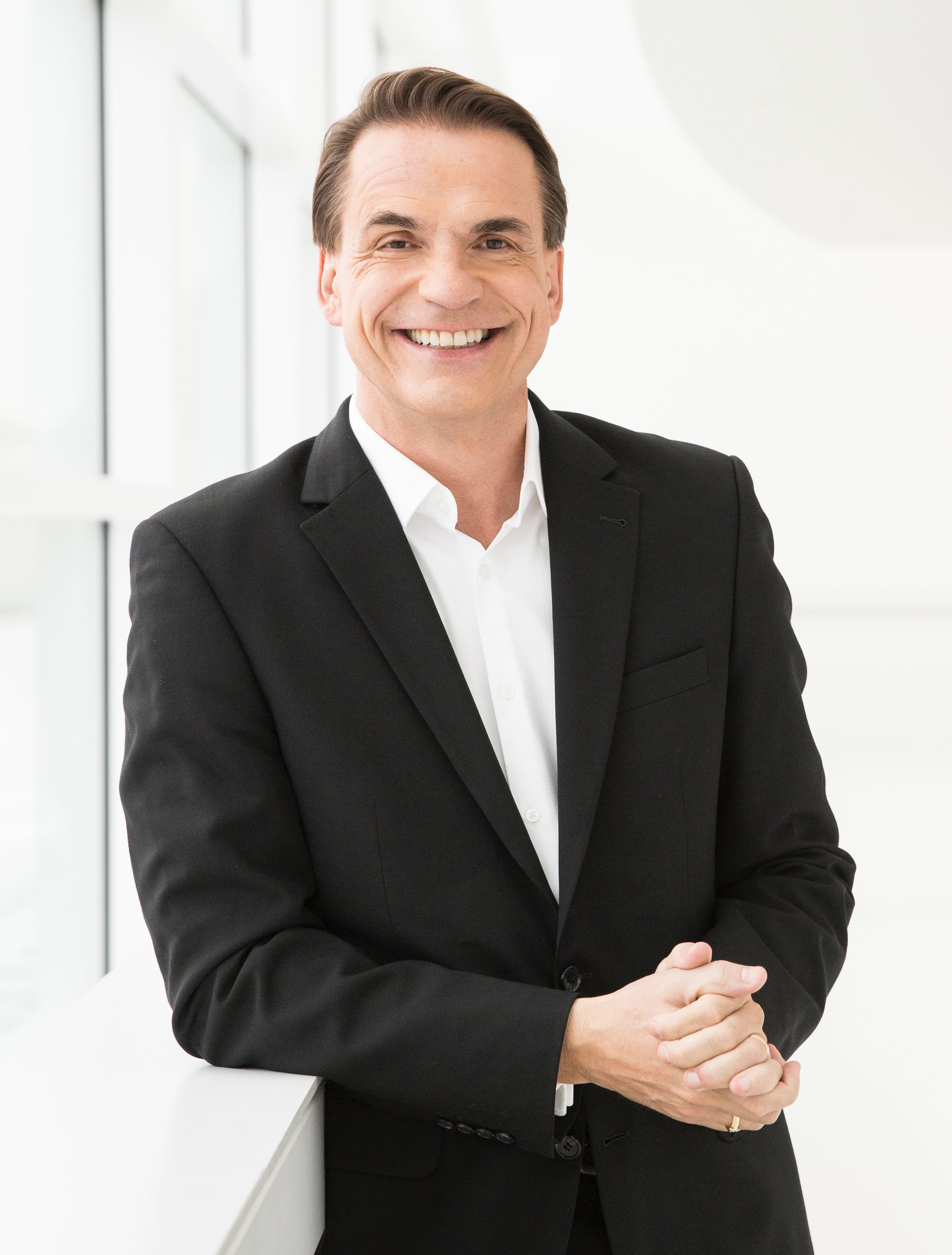
- Dohle in 2017
- Born: 28 June 1968 (age 56); Arnsberg, West Germany (now Germany)
- Education: University of Karlsruhe
- Employer: Penguin Random House (2013–2022)

Markus Dohle (born 28 June 1968) is a German businessperson. He was the chief executive officer of Penguin Random House from July 2013 to December 2022.

== Early life and education ==
Markus Dohle was born on 28 June 1968 in Arnsberg. He attended the University of Karlsruhe, where he studied industrial engineering and management.

== Career ==
As of 2005, Dohle headed Mohn Media-Gruppe, a Bertelsmann subsidiary. He became an executive at Arvato in 2006.

Dohle headed the printing division at Bertelsmann, Random House's parent company, before moving to Random House. Dohle was named the CEO of Random House in 2008, before its merger with Penguin Books. Dohle was considered an "outsider" when he became CEO of Random House; although he had experience in the printing industry, he had not worked on the editorial side of publishing. Dohle supervised the 2013 merger of Penguin and Random House. He became CEO on 1 July 2013.

In September 2021, Dohle gave the opening speech at the Frankfurt Book Fair. Discussing a proposed merger between Penguin Random House and Simon & Schuster, Dohle said that the merger's aim was to "create the future of books".

On 9 December 2022, Dohle announced his departure from Penguin Random House. He was succeeded by interim CEO Nihar Malaviya, effective 1 January 2023.
