= Thomas Rabe (business manager) =

German manager (born 1965)

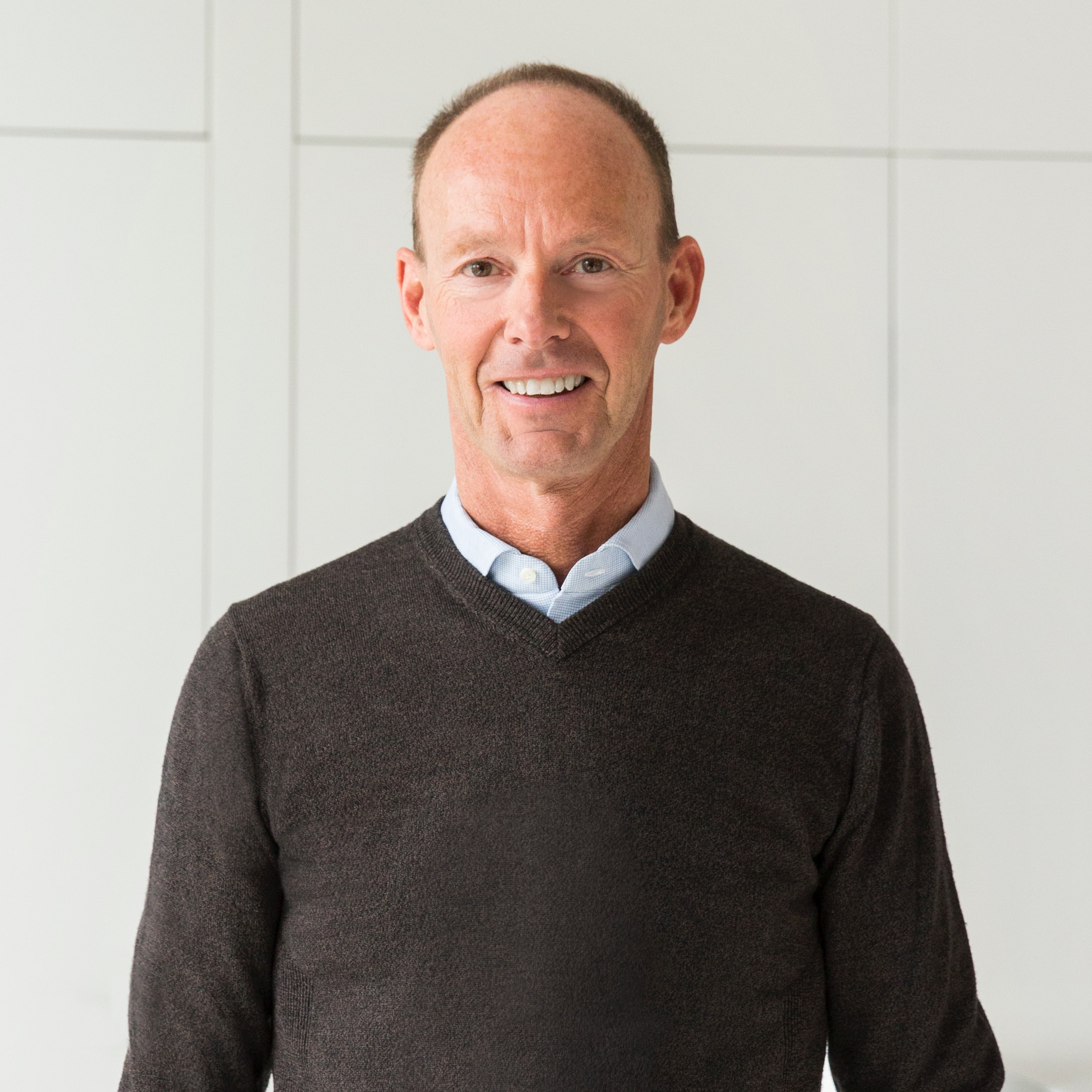
- Rabe in 2022
- Born: Thomas Hermann Rabe; August 6, 1965 (age 61); Luxembourg
- Education: RWTH Aachen University; University of Cologne
- Occupation: Business executive
- Title: Chairman & CEO, Bertelsmann
- Spouse: Birgit Rabe

Thomas Hermann Rabe (born August 6, 1965) is a German business executive. In 2006, he was appointed to the Bertelsmann executive board, of which he has been chairman and chief executive officer since 2012. Under his leadership, the group expanded above all its book publishing, music and education businesses, and North America became its largest region by revenue. From 2019 to 2026, Rabe also served as chief executive officer of RTL Group, and from 2022 to 2023 additionally as CEO of RTL Deutschland. From 2020 to 2026, he was chairman of the supervisory board of Adidas.

== Early life and education ==
Rabe was born in 1965 in Luxembourg, and grew up in Brussels, where his father worked as a civil servant in the European Coal and Steel Community from 1968. He attended the European School and as a youth was a bass player in a punk band. After completing his German baccalaureate (Abitur), Rabe studied Business and Economics at the RWTH Aachen and the University of Cologne. After earning a degree in business administration in 1989, he obtained his doctorate in economics, with a doctoral thesis on "Liberalization and Deregulation in the European Single Market for Insurance" in 1995.

In addition to his native language German, Rabe speaks English, French, Dutch, and Spanish.

== Career ==
Rabe began his career at the European Commission in Brussels. At the commission, from 1989 he worked in the Directorate-General for Financial Institutions and Corporate Law. One year later, he joined his supervisor in moving to the law firm Forrester, Norall & Sutton, which today belongs to White & Case. There he managed client accounts from the European Union, the United States and Japan. In 1991, Rabe was employed by the Treuhand agency in Berlin. In this capacity, among other responsibilities, he was in charge of the privatization of the assets of the Ministry for State Security and the National People's Army of the former GDR. In 1993, he was promoted to head of the Controlling Department. Subsequently, Rabe was involved as head of acquisitions at the Beteiligungsgesellschaft Neue Länder investment agency of the Association of German Banks (BdB), in investing DM 400 million in East German companies. After earning his Ph.D., in 1996 Rabe was hired as office head of the CEO of the Luxembourg financial service provider, Cedel International. He held additional positions there before being appointed chief financial officer in 1998. In subsequent years, he prepared the merger of Cedel International with Deutsche Börse Clearing into Clearstream.

In 2000, Rabe joined RTL Group as CFO. Here, he was additionally responsible for strategy and the Luxembourg television and radio business. Five years later, Bertelsmann brought him back to Gütersloh. Rabe was appointed as the group's CFO on January 1, 2006. At the same time, he was responsible for Sony BMG until 2008. Among other activities, Rabe also negotiated the buyback of shares from Groupe Bruxelles Lambert to prevent Bertelsmann from going public. In addition, the group established its own investment fund in Bertelsmann Digital Media Investments. Later, Rabe organized the return of Bertelsmann into the music business. His recruitment of Kohlberg Kravis Roberts & Co. as an investor in BMG Rights Management was seen as a key decision for the music company's future development.

Around 2009 Rabe was reportedly considered as future CEO of the ProSiebenSat.1 Media group and of the Franz Haniel & Cie. investment holding, but Rabe ultimately stayed with Bertelsmann.

=== CEO of Bertelsmann, 2012–present ===
After Hartmut Ostrowski announced his retirement as chairman and CEO in 2011, Rabe was declared his successor, effective January 1, 2012. With Rabe's appointment, Bertelsmann ushered in a strategy change towards stronger growth. Under his leadership, Bertelsmann experienced increased growth into Brazil, China, and India, and consolidated this development by bundling these activities in the Bertelsmann Investments division. Also, Rabe managed to complete the merger of Penguin Books with Random House to create the world's largest trade book publisher, and the purchase of the remaining shares in Gruner + Jahr. He built the education division into an additional pillar of the business, which today operates as the Bertelsmann Education Group. He consolidated the printing operations into the Bertelsmann Printing Group. Thus, by 2016, he had expanded the number of corporate divisions to eight. In 2024, North America overtook Germany as Bertelsmann's largest region by revenue.

In 2016, Rabe's contract as chairman and CEO of Bertelsmann's executive board was extended until 2021, and in 2021 until the end of 2026. From 2019 to 2026, he was also CEO of RTL Group, Bertelsmann's television division. From August 2022 to the end of 2023, he additionally served as CEO of RTL Deutschland. He is a member of the board of directors of Penguin Random House, among others.

== Other activities ==
=== Corporate boards ===
- Adidas, chairman of the supervisory board (2020–2026)
- Penguin Random House, chairman of the supervisory board (since 2018)
- Gruner + Jahr, Member of the supervisory board (since 2012)
- RTL Group, chairman of the board of directors (2012–2019) and chief executive officer (2019–2026)
- Symrise (2011–2019), Chairman of the Supervisory Board
- Springer Science+Business Media, Member of supervisory board (since 2010)

=== Non-profit boards ===
- Federation of German Industries (BDI), Member of the Presidium (2017–2018)
- Baden-Badener Unternehmer-Gespräche (BBUG), Member of the Board of Trustees

== Personal life ==
Rabe lives in Gütersloh and Berlin and is married to the neurologist Birgit Rabe. The couple collects modern art and, in 2015, purchased a Henry van de Velde-designed villa in Tervuren near Brussels.

Rabe is a member of the Catholic fraternity AV Hansea-Berlin zu Köln.
