= Schöner Wohnen =

German interior design magazine (1960–)

- Logo since 1989
- Former editors: Josef Kremerkothen
- Categories: Interior design magazine
- Frequency: Monthly
- Founded: 1960
- Company: Gruner + Jahr
- Country: Germany
- Based in: Hamburg
- Language: German
- Website: www.schoener-wohnen.de
- ISSN: 0941-5718
- OCLC: 457010368

Schöner Wohnen (stylized in all caps; German: Better Dwelling) is a German language interior design magazine which was launched in 1960 by Gruner + Jahr.

== History and profile ==
Schöner Wohnen was established in 1960 by the Hamburg-based publishing company Gruner + Jahr. Its founding editor-in-chief was Josef Kremerkothen. The magazine enjoyed high levels of readership after its start. It has published photographs of the latest trends in furniture design, color palettes and room arrangements. Later its coverage was expanded to feature articles about architecture, lifestyle, gardening and travel. The magazine is the first German publication which employed the term design classic in 1974.
