= Madeleine Schickedanz =

German billionaire

- Born: 20 October 1943 (age 83); Nuremberg, Bavaria, Germany
- Occupations: Heiress, philanthropist

Madeleine Schickedanz (born 20 October 1943) is a German heiress and philanthropist. She is the daughter of Gustav and Grete Schickedanz, the founders of catalog retailer Quelle Versand, which was merged with Karstadt to form Arcandor, a company listed in Germany's Mid Cap DAX stock index until its 2009 bankruptcy.

== Biography ==
Schickedanz was born in Nuremberg. She interrupted her studies in business economics after two semesters. She is married to her third husband, Leo Herl. The pair splits their time between Fürth and St. Moritz as they wish. Schickedanz has four children, two each from her former marriages to Hans-Georg Mangold and Wolfgang Bühler, both of whom were Quelle managers. After her daughter Caroline successfully overcame leukemia in 1990, Schickedanz founded the Madeleine Schickedanz KinderKrebs-Stiftung, a charity that supports children who suffer from cancer.

She was the 13th-richest woman in the world, and the 142nd richest person in the world, according to Forbes in 2007. However, as of 9 June 2009, she has declared insolvency after the bankruptcy of her holding company Arcandor. She and her husband claimed to live on only €600 per month in the aftermath of the insolvency. In January 2010, she sold two of her villas in St. Moritz for US$68 million to pay down the debt. In 2014, she sued her former advisor Josef Esch of the Sal. Oppenheim bank for undertaking risky investments. She was supported in her claim by Thomas Middelhoff.
