= Thomas Middelhoff =

German retired corporate manager (born 1953)

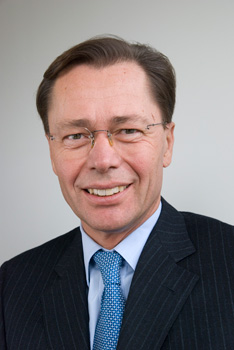
- Middelhoff in 2008
- Born: Thomas Middelhoff; May 11, 1953 (age 73); Düsseldorf, North Rhine-Westphalia, West Germany
- Education: University of Münster (PhD)
- Occupations: Business executive, consultant
- Employer(s): Formerly Bertelsmann and Investcorp
- Known for: Member of the Executive Board and Chief Executive Officer of Bertelsmann between 1998 and 2002
- Spouses: Cornelie Middelhoff (divorced) Deborah Gottlieb (m. 2021)
- Children: 5

Thomas Middelhoff (born 11 May 1953) is a German corporate manager. From 1994 to 1998, he was a member of the executive board of Bertelsmann AG, then CEO of the Bertelsmann media group from November 1998 to July 2002. In 2002, he was head of corporate investments in Europe for Investcorp International Ltd until May 2005. From May 2005 to February 2009, Middelhoff then took over as chairman of the board of management of the retail group Arcandor (previously KarstadtQuelle). After Arcandor, Middelhoff founded the investment company BLM (Berger Lahnstein Middelhoff & Partners LLP) in London with Roland Berger and Florian Lahnstein. The spin-off Pulse Capital Partners LLC emerged from this company.

== Early life and education ==
Middelhoff grew up as the third of five children in a Catholic family in Düsseldorf and Ratingen. His father worked as a sales representative in his uncle's textile factory. He studied business at the University of Münster and received his doctorate at the Institute for Marketing under the supervision of Heribert Meffert. While at university, he was already working in his father's textile business. After graduating he was given a high post in the company. He received his doctorate in 1987 from Bruno Tietz at the University of Saarbrücken with a thesis on the integrated planning of communication systems: illustrated by the introduction of Btx in retail-oriented branch systems and cooperative groups.

== Career ==
=== Bertelsmann (1986 - 2002) ===
In 1986 he moved to Bertelsmann, a multinational media corporation based in Germany, as assistant manager of the graphic firm in Gütersloh. A year later he became managing director of the subsidiary Elsnerdruck in Berlin, and in 1989 managing director of Mohndruck. In 1990, he became a member of the board of directors of Bertelsmann. In 1994 he was appointed to the Executive Board of Bertelsmann AG and took over management of corporate development and coordination of the multimedia business, where he was responsible for the strategic realignment of the group in the field of electronic entertainment.

Middelhoff recognized the potential of the new digital media early. He made small investments into the company Pixelpark in Berlin among others, on Bertelsmann's behalf. This was followed by further investments in Lycos and Mediaways. As an early believer in the rapid development of the Internet, he suggested a large financial participation of Bertelsmann in America Online (AOL) when it was still a young company, and created the joint venture AOL Europe, with a financial holding of $50 million for a 5% stake. This investment was extremely successful and would later influence Middelhoff's ascent in the company to CEO and chairman of the board. In May 1995, he became a member of the governing board of AOL, and during his time in this position Middelhoff became a "close friend" of AOL's founder, Steve Case. In 1995, Bertelsmann and AOL started the joint venture AOL Germany.

From November 1998 to July 2002, Middelhoff was the CEO of Bertelsmann. During this time he built up the RTL Group, today the largest operator of advertising-financed commercial television and radio in Europe. He expanded the book division into the world market leader by purchasing Random House and intensified the company's Internet activities by starting the online media portal BOL (Bertelsmann Online), which was sold to Buch.de Internetstores in 2002. In addition, he was responsible for a planned joint venture with Amazon, which did not receive the approval of the majority on Bertelsmann's Executive Board. But Bertelsmann soon stepped back from these online engagements, selling its shares of AOL-Europe back to Time Warner and sold the 50% stake for 7.6 billion euros in cash, which had merged with AOL in 2001.

Besides his position at the Bertelsmann group, Middelhoff has also been a member of the Board of Trustees of the non-profit Bertelsmann Stiftung, too (2000–2002).

=== Arcandor ===
Beginning in 2003, Middelhoff coordinated the European affairs of the holding company Investcorp. The German businesses of the corporation included Gerresheimer Glas and Callahan. After APCOA Parking was taken over by Investcorp in 2004, he was appointed to its supervisory board.

Since 2003, Middelhoff has also been a member of the board of The New York Times Company responsible for the compensation committee. As a confidant of Madeleine Schickedanz, he became the chairman of KarstadtQuelle AG's supervisory board in June 2004 and its CEO in May 2005. KarstadtQuelle was renamed Arcandor in 2007.

Middelhoff pushed through the renaming of KarstadtQuelle as Arcandor and divided the operational business into the three core areas of department store (Karstadt), mail order (Primondo) and tourism (Thomas Cook). When he joined the company, the share price was 7.60 euros and peaked in 2007 at around 29 euros. Due to the expansion of the tourism business, sales rose to 21 billion euros in 2007 and equity grew. Since 2007, Middelhoff was Chairman of the Supervisory Board of the Thomas Cook Group, the world's second largest tourism company, in which Arcandor held 52% of the shares.

Middelhoff was removed from his position as CEO of Arcandor and Thomas Cook Group in March 2009. In May 2009, Arcandor had to ask for government guarantees and loans. On the same day, it became known that the responsible public prosecutor's office had opened a preliminary investigation into Middelhoff's personal involvement in the Oppenheim-Esch Fund, this going back to the suggestion of the then Federal Minister of Justice Brigitte Zypries (SPD), with a corresponding letter & request to former counterpart Roswitha Müller-Piepenkötter (CDU) to intervene, which was then discontinued years later. Arcandor declared bankruptcy in the following week. In 2014, Middelhoff was convicted on criminal charges related to his activities while head of Arcandor; he was sentenced to three years' imprisonment. Middlehoff served three years in prison for Arcandor-related crimes. He separated from his wife, with whom he had five children.

=== Post-Arcandor ===
In February 2009, Middelhoff founded the investment company BLM (Berger Lahnstein Middelhoff & Partners LLP) in London with Roland Berger and Florian Lahnstein; Middelhoff became its chairman. In September 2009, Germany1 took over the majority of the manufacturer of power supply devices AEG Power Solutions. In 2010, Germany1 was renamed 3W Power Holdings, the company headquarters were relocated from the British tax haven of Guernsey to Luxembourg, and Middelhoff was elected to the Board of Directors.

In 2010, this company was split into two legally and economically independent companies: Pulse Capital Partners LLC in New York with Thomas Middelhoff as Managing Partner and RiverRock European Capital Partners LLP in London. Pulse Capital Partners took over the hedge fund activities of Berger Lahnstein Middelhoff & Partners. The official start of business was in March 2011. The company specializes in advising investors on hedge fund selection and portfolio structuring. Middelhoff was one of three managing partners. In 2013, Middelhoff announced he had taken on a new role as a director and partner in Hong Kong media company BT Capital.

== Awards ==
- 1998: Vernon A. Walters Award
- 2008: Honorary doctorate of Leipzig Commercial College

== Reception ==
Middelhoff wrote his autobiography A 115 - The fall, which was published in September 2017. On October 20, 2017, the Stuttgart Regional Court granted an injunction by the news magazine Der Spiegel, so that the book in its original version written by Middelhoff could no longer be sold. Middelhoff claimed in the book that the editors of Der Spiegel had researched improperly, withheld facts and relied on dubious sources. The book has since been published in a further edition and in a paperback version and contains an afterword by Bernd Schünemann, one of the leading legal scholars who has critically examined the legal proceedings to which Middelhoff was subjected.

On November 23, 2017, the documentary People Up Close: Thomas Middelhoff – Crash of a Top Manager was broadcast on WDR. WDR stopped the broadcast three days before the scheduled date after learning that the producer had made an agreement with Middelhoff to show him the film before it was broadcast publicly. The production company later sold the rights to OMR. The latter produced a film of just under 60 minutes, which was published on YouTube and has since received around 700,000 views.

On August 20, 2019, his second book Schuldig was published, which made it onto the Spiegel bestseller list.

In October 2020, his book Future missed? Why Germany missed digitization. And how the crisis is helping us to make the connection after all was published, which Middelhoff wrote together with the entrepreneur Cornelius Boersch. The book deals with possible lessons from the COVID-19 pandemic and the resulting economic crisis in 2020 for digitization.
