= Sonopress =

German CD and DVD manufacturer

Sonopress GmbH
- Company type: GmbH
- Industry: Media manufacturing
- Founded: April 22, 1958; 68 years ago
- Headquarters: Gütersloh, Germany
- Key people: Sven Deutschmann, Jörg Dickenhorst
- Parent: Bertelsmann SE & Co. KGaA
- Website: www.sonopress.de

Sonopress GmbH is an internationally active media service provider headquartered in Gütersloh, Germany. The company specializes in the production and distribution of physical and digital storage media and is part of the Bertelsmann Marketing Services division of the Bertelsmann Group.

== History ==
Sonopress was founded on April 22, 1958, to meet the demand for vinyl records from the Bertelsmann Record Club. Initial production began with six pressing machines in a small facility in Gütersloh. Over the decades, the company developed into one of the world’s leading providers of digital media manufacturing services, working with major clients such as Warner Bros. and Universal Pictures International.

In 1984, Sonopress began manufacturing Compact Discs (CDs) and quickly became one of Europe’s largest CD producers. As of 2022, the company had produced more than eight billion CDs.

Between 2008 and 2015, Sonopress operated under the name Arvato Entertainment. Since 2016, it has been part of the Bertelsmann Marketing Services division.

== Product portfolio ==
Sonopress offers a wide range of services to the entertainment industry, including:

- Replication of CDs, DVDs, Blu-ray Discs, and Ultra HD Blu-ray Discs, EcoRecords, Vinyls
- Digitization, archiving, and asset management
- Print management and printing services
- Fulfillment and supply chain management

The company manufactures up to 1.5 million data carriers per day.

== Sustainability and innovation ==
As part of its sustainability strategy, Sonopress developed the EcoRecord, an environmentally friendly vinyl record made from recycled PET instead of conventional PVC. The EcoRecord was first used in 2025 for the album Liam Gallagher John Squire.

In 2022, the company resumed vinyl record production, initially in collaboration with French partner Media Industries.

== Company structure ==
Sonopress is a wholly owned subsidiary of Bertelsmann SE & Co. KGaA and part of the Bertelsmann Marketing Services division. It is led by managing directors Sven Deutschmann and Jörg Dickenhorst.

== Locations ==
In addition to its headquarters in Gütersloh, the company operates manufacturing and replication sites in Europe, Asia, and North America. A significant portion of production still takes place in Germany.
