= Julia Jäkel =

German business executive and publisher

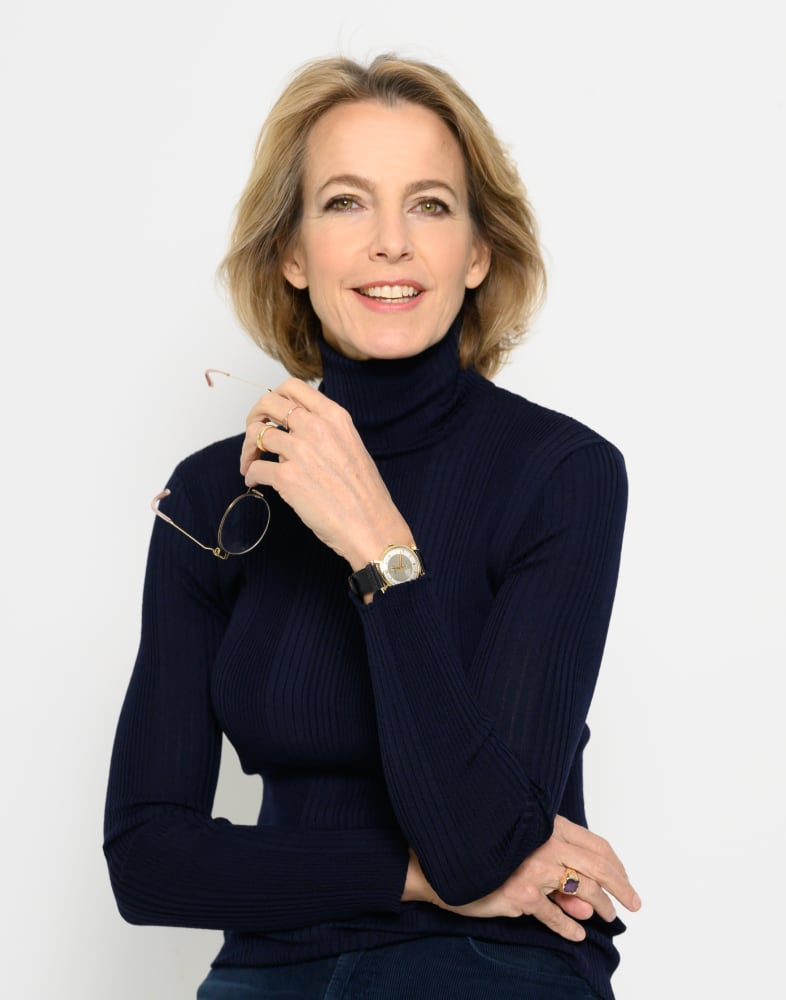
- Jäkel in 2020
- Born: November 13, 1971 (age 54); Mainz, West Germany (now Germany)
- Education: Heidelberg University; Harvard University; University of Cambridge
- Years active: 1997–present
- Known for: Chief Executive Officer of Gruner + Jahr (2012–2021)
- Board member of: Adevinta; Holtzbrinck Publishing Group
- Spouse: Ulrich Wickert
- Children: 2
- Awards: Media Manager of the Year, 2016 (Kress Media); Media Woman of the Year, 2017 (Horizont, 2017); Media Personality of the Year, 2018 (W&V)
- Website: juliajaekel.de

Julia Jäkel (born November 13, 1971) is a German business executive and publisher. She serves as non-executive director of several companies. From 2012 to 2021, Jäkel was Chief Executive Officer of Gruner + Jahr and a member of the Bertelsmann Group Management Committee. She also chaired the Bertelsmann Content Alliance. Jäkel is a widely known promoter of diverse leadership.

== Early life and education ==
Jäkel studied history, political science, and economics at Heidelberg University and Harvard University. She holds an MPhil in International relations from the University of Cambridge.

== Career ==
In 1997, Jäkel completed the Bertelsmann Entrepreneurs Program and joined Gruner + Jahr, where she rose through the ranks. In 2012, Jäkel was appointed to the Executive Board, taking responsibility for the German business, and a few months later, she became chief executive officer of Gruner + Jahr. At the beginning of her term, she discontinued the Financial Times Deutschland of which she had been a member of the founding team for five years. She reorganized the portfolio, focusing on Germany and France. Jäkel led the digital transformation, promoted creativity and multiplied digital revenues. She broke up hierarchies and outdated management structures, and made the publisher more efficient.

Jäkel became a member of the Bertelsmann Group Management Committee in 2013 and chaired the Bertelsmann Content Alliance right from its start in 2019, coordinating all content businesses of Bertelsmann in Germany. In 2021, Jäkel left both Gruner + Jahr and Bertelsmann at her own request.

In 2023, Jäkel was appointed by Germany’s state governments as a member of an expert group advising on a reform of country’s public broadcasting.

== Recognition ==
Jäkel received awards for her entrepreneurial and journalistic engagement.

== Other activities ==
=== Corporate boards ===
- Munich Re, Member of the Supervisory Board (since 2024)
- Google Cloud Platform, Member of the European Advisory Board (since 2022)
- Adevinta, Member of the Supervisory Board (since 2021)
- Holtzbrinck Publishing Group, Member of the Supervisory Board (since 2021)
- Deutsche Presse-Agentur (DPA), Member of the Supervisory Board (since 2021)

=== Non-profit organizations ===
- DFL Foundation (German Football League Foundation), Member of the Board of Trustees (since 2019)
- Elbphilharmonie Hamburg, Member of the Board of Trustees (since 2018)
- University Medical Center Hamburg-Eppendorf, Member of the Board of Trustees (since 2015)
- German Cancer Research Center (DKFZ), Member of the Advisory Council
