= Arvato =

German global services company

The Arvato Group is a global services company headquartered in Gütersloh, Germany. Its services include customer support, information technology, logistics, and finance. The history of Arvato goes back to the printing and industry services division of Bertelsmann; the current name was introduced in 1999. Today, Arvato is one of eight divisions of Bertelsmann, the media, services, and education group. In 2016, Arvato had about 68,463 employees and an overall turnover of 3.84 billion euros.

== History ==
=== Early years of Arvato ===
Bertelsmann was founded as a publishing house by Carl Bertelsmann in 1835. In the following decades, the company grew steadily. After the Second World War, it developed from a mid-sized business to a large enterprise. To meet the demand from the book club Lesering and the record club Schallplattenring, Bertelsmann massively expanded its warehouse and shipping capacities in the mid-1950s. In 1959, the Kommissionshaus Buch und Ton was established to make the production and service infrastructure available for other publishing and printing companies. Bertelsmann benefited from this due to economies of scale. A punch-card index at the Lesering headquarters was acquired from Lufthansa, which later became the basis for the information technology expertise of Arvato. During the first years, Reinhard Mohn was the sole owner of the Kommissionshaus Buch und Ton. In 1968, the company became part of the newly founded Vereinigte Verlagsauslieferung (VVA). Its purpose was the delivery of printed materials and records "in the name and on behalf of its clients."

=== Business unit formation ===
Bertelsmann opened its printing business to outside clients in a similar way, forming a new company called Mohndruck in 1948. After purchasing powerful machines that required a high capacity utilization, Bertelsmann acquired more and more orders from other companies in the 1960s. In the 1970s and 1980s, Bertelsmann founded and bought several other printing and logistics companies in France, Great Britain, Spain, and other European countries. These became part of the printing and industry services division of Bertelsmann. From 1976, the branch was led by Mark Wössner, who later became Bertelsmann CEO. Under his leadership, the expansion continued. For example, Bertelsmann entered the software and hardware distribution market in 1983. Until the mid-1980s, the printing and industry services division generated more than 20 percent of the sales of the whole Bertelsmann group. In the late 1980s, the company also expanded its presence in the United States. In the 1990s, Bertelsmann introduced the loyalty program Miles & More on behalf of Lufthansa in 1993. Additionally, the company became responsible for customer support for the launch of Microsoft's Windows 95 operating system in Germany, Austria, and Switzerland.

=== Restructuring and renaming ===
In 1996, Bertelsmann's printing and industry services division was spun off as a legally independent joint-stock company (Aktiengesellschaft) named Bertelsmann Industrie. Bertelsmann wanted to expand its service business even more. At that time, Bertelsmann Industrie had approximately 12,600 employees worldwide and generated sales of 3.28 billion Deutschmarks annually. In 1999, the company finally was renamed Bertelsmann Arvato to illustrate the transformation of the printing and industry services division to an international communications and media service provider. The name Arvato was a neologism with no special meaning. Under the leadership of Gunter Thielen, who became CEO of Bertelsmann in 2002, the LP and CD pressing plants of Sonopress and the encyclopedia publishers were integrated with Arvato, too. With the inauguration of Hartmut Ostrowski as CEO of Arvato in 2002, the company laid the prefix Bertelsmann in the company name but continued to use it for its logo (stylized as arvato BERTELSMANN). Arvato restructured its business into divisions for printing, distribution, and logistics services, as well as storage media and information technology.

=== Change in the business model ===
Due to lower volumes of newspapers, magazines, and catalogs, Arvato, Axel Springer, and Gruner + Jahr founded a joint venture for parts of their printing business; it was named Prinovis. In 2005, all rotogravure printing activities of the three founding partners became part of the company, which was the market leader in Europe from its very beginning. At the same time, Arvato entered the market for public sector services. One of the first clients was the district of East Riding of Yorkshire where Arvato managed local taxes and welfare payments, for example. In the following years, distribution and logistics became more and more important: Arvato Direct Services and Logistics Services were merged into Arvato Services. Especially in Germany, Arvato won more clients for this division, including publishing houses as well as companies in the high-tech and information technology industry. At the turn of 2007/2008, Hartmut Ostrowski succeeded Gunter Thielen as CEO of Bertelsmann, so Rolf Buch moved to the helm of Arvato. Under his leadership, Arvato started the loyalty program DeutschlandCard, for example. While Ostrowski focused on international expansion, Buch strengthened Arvato's presence in its home market Germany.

=== Reintegration of staff functions ===
In the 2010s, Arvato restructured its activities again: First of all, the company acquired the remaining shares of Prinovis from Gruner + Jahr. Subsequently, Bertelsmann merged most of its printing plants into a new division called Be Printers. Arvato increased its focus on high-tech, information technology, and e-commerce services, three rapidly growing markets, while printing stagnated. At the end of 2012, Rolf Buch was surprisingly replaced by Achim Berg, an expert for the said focus areas. Under his leadership, Arvato acquired the insolvent e-commerce company Netrada in 2014, which led to a massive expansion in Arvato's market position in fashion logistics. After two years, Berg left Arvato in mid-2015. Bertelsmann appointed Fernando Carro as CEO of Arvato; he also became a member of the Executive Board of Bertelsmann. As part of the restructuring, Arvato dissolved its Board of Directors and replaced it with an executive management team. The Bertelsmann corporate center took over some staff functions of Arvato, while some are provided from within the Arvato divisions independently. In 2016, the Arvato AG was merged into the parent company Bertelsmann SE & Co. KGaA and deleted from the commercial register.

== Organization ==
Arvato is one of eight divisions of Bertelsmann. Together with the Bertelsmann Printing Group, founded in 2016, it forms the services divisions of the group. Based on sales of 4.8 billion euros in the fiscal year 2015, Arvato was the second-largest division of Bertelsmann after RTL Group. Countries outside Germany generated more than half of the revenue, with France and the United States being the most important foreign markets. In 2015, exactly 230 individual companies as well as five joint ventures and associated enterprises belonged to Arvato, many of them for local business operations.

In the fiscal year 2015, Arvato had 72,457 employees worldwide, an increase of 1,804 employees compared to the previous year. Since 2014, Arvato has been organized in so-called solution groups, which were introduced during the era of Achim Berg. These operate largely autonomously not for products and technology, but according to client requirements and operations. Each solution group is led by the chief executive officer. Currently, there are four solution groups for customer relationship management, supply chain management, financial services, and information technology services. The Arvato management board consists of Thomas Rabe, Bernd Hirsch, Immanuel Hermreck, Thomas Mackenbrock, Rolf Hellermann, Andreas Krohn, Frank Schirrmeister, and Matthias Moeller.

== Services ==
Aftersales Solutions

Arvato provides services needed after the sale of third-party products to end users, such as the repair and preparation of devices. Since the 2000s, Arvato has helped fixing mobile phones, including devices from HTC Corporation.

Corporate Information Management

Arvato provides many services related to the logistics of marketing and sales materials and other documents. The company organizes the production, storage, and distribution of these. In recent years, the connection between digital and printed works has become more important.

CRM & Customer Services

Arvato offers customer relationship management services. The company operates call centers and manages digital communication channels for its customers, for example. Also, data mining processes and some solutions for the public sector are offered in this area.

E-Commerce Solutions

E-commerce has been a strategic growth area for Arvato and for Bertelsmann, at least since 2014. The company's services range from the establishment and operation of websites and related infrastructure to the logistics of goods. One client of Arvato in this field is the fashion house Ahlers.

Financial Solutions

Arvato's financial solutions include payment processing, factoring, and debt collection services. Furthermore, the company's credit rating and risk management activities, as well as insurance services, are offered in this field. Financial services have been one of the most profitable Arvato businesses and are also a strategic growth area for Bertelsmann. Arvato was revealed, by a Times investigation to have obtained warrants to break into the home of vulnerable customers, and to have executed those warrants. This resulted in an investigation by the Financial Conduct Authority (FCA). Subsequently, suppliers who have previously worked with Arvato have ceased trading with the company.

IT Solutions

Arvato Systems provides information technology services of many kinds. Primarily, the company is heavily involved in cloud computing. Arvato provides solutions for media, commerce, and several other industries.

SCM & Logistics

Arvato helps its clients with supply chain management, i.e. the provision of materials and products from manufacturing to the consumers. The portfolio of the company includes various solutions tailored to different industries, e.g. trade and fashion companies, information technology, and high-tech companies or publishing houses. An example of the latter is the Vereinigte Verlagsauslieferung (VVA). This area also includes business intelligence services.

== Criticism ==
=== Human resources and wages ===
The human resources and compensation policies of Arvato have repeatedly been discussed: In 2005, Arvato Direct Services built a call center in Cottbus, Germany. The company was criticized for seeking more than usual financial support from the local employment agency. The trade union Ver.di and others shared this view. 2007, Ver.di criticized the reintroduction of the 40-hour working week with Arvato Services. In 2012, employees had to accept lower wages because of job cuts at Arvato Entertainment. Arvato rejected criticism in this particular case because decisions have been discussed with Ver.di previously.

=== Irregular credit scores ===
In 2005, Arvato acquired the credit agency Infoscore, headquartered in Baden-Baden, Germany. Its data, information, and receivables management was merged with Arvato's subsidiary to form Arvato Infoscore, a company with a total of 1,700 employees. It became an object of repeated criticism because of allegedly dubious credit ratings.

2012, for example, the public broadcaster NDR reported the case of a consumer who was refused to pay by invoice. This decision was taken by a mail-order company based on a credit rating by Arvato Infoscore. Although the company hardly knew more than the name and address of the consumer and had no other adverse information, it gave a low score based on socio-demographic characteristics. According to a report by the State Commissioner for Data Protection in the German state of Baden-Württemberg, outdated data were used for this credit rating. In 2013, another public broadcaster, WDR, made similar allegations: The television magazine Markt checked the credit reports of 80 test consumers. The magazine concluded that credit ratings issued by Arvato Infoscore often were not comprehensive. There was a "significant gap" in the quality of information. Furthermore, Markt pointed out that complaints about scoring providers like Arvato Infoscore were rising.

Besides the credit ratings, data protection at Arvato Infoscore was the object of media coverage several times. 2015, the NDR criticized the self-service website for tenant self-disclosures showed sensitive personal information of one entered the name, address, and date of birth. Without any further verification, Arvato Infoscore made available information on debt, seizure, and mortgage payments, for example. Critics said that this opened the door for abuse. Arvato Infoscore instead argued that obtaining a self-disclosure for third parties was not permitted. Nevertheless, the disputed website was shut down.

2016, SWR, another public broadcaster, reported that Arvato Infoscore handles the collection of penalty fares for Deutsche Bahn. As part of this, information about travelers is passed without their knowledge. The lawyer Karl-Nikolaus Peifer classified this process as a breach of data protection and fair-trade laws. The SWR also provided evidence that Arvato Infoscore had used information from such penalty fares for credit ratings of some customers, too.

=== Facebook content moderation ===
In December 2016, SZ-Magazin reported that Arvato employees in the company's Berlin office sustained psychological trauma, including posttraumatic stress disorder, as a result of exposure to videos of torture, murder, bestiality, and child pornography they were required to evaluate as content moderators for Facebook. Inspectors from the Landesamt für Arbeitsschutz, Gesundheitsschutz und technische Sicherheit Berlin (LAGetSi), the city's occupational safety and health department, visited the office in February 2017, but the inspection did not result in formal action.
