= Hartmut Ostrowski =

CEO of Bertelsmann AG from 2008 to 2011

Hartmut Ostrowski (born 25 February 1958 in Bielefeld) was CEO of Bertelsmann AG from 1 January 2008 until 31 December 2011, succeeding Gunter Thielen.

Ostrowski studied business administration at Bielefeld University and joined Bertelsmann AG in 1982. From 1 September 2002 until December 2007, Ostrowski was CEO of Arvato AG, an international media and communication service provider, a 100% subsidiary of Bertelsmann AG.

Ostrowski is married and has two children.
