= Bertelsmann =

German media conglomerate

Coordinates: 51°54′29″N 8°25′09″E

Bertelsmann SE & Co. KGaA
- Logo used since 2011

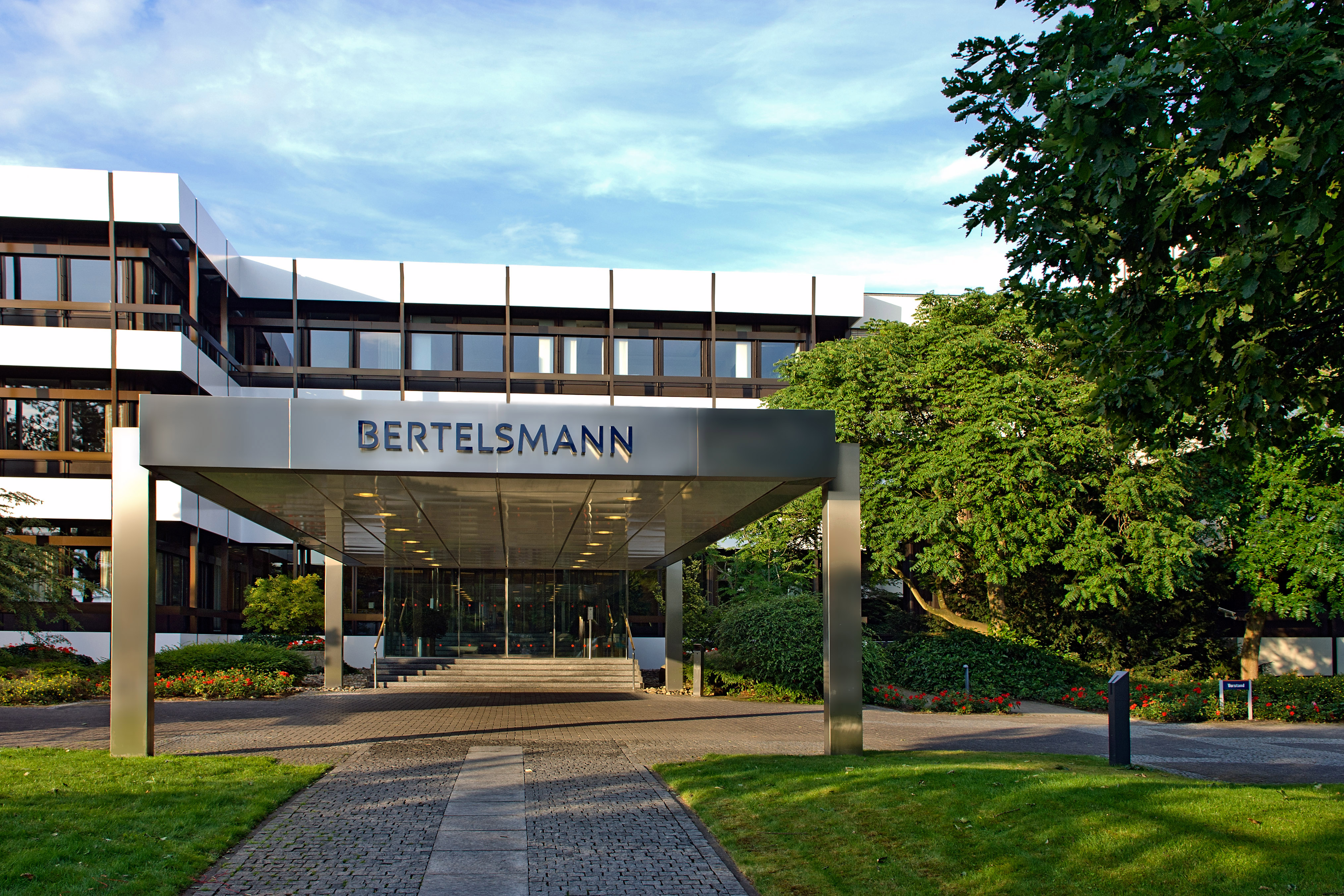
- Headquarters in Gütersloh
- Formerly: Bertelsmann AG (1971–2012)
- Type: Private
- Industry: Mass media
- Founded: 1 July 1835; 191 years ago
- Founder: Carl Bertelsmann
- Headquarters: Gütersloh, Germany
- Area served: Worldwide
- Key people: Thomas Rabe (chairman and CEO); Carsten Coesfeld (Member of the Executive Board); Thomas Coesfeld (Member of the Executive Board); Rolf Hellermann (CFO); Immanuel Hermreck (Chief Human Resources Officer); Christoph Mohn (chairman of the Supervisory Board)
- Products: Publishing; record label; broadcasting; cable television; film production
- Revenue: €18,988 million (2024)
- Net income: €1,036 million (2024)
- Total assets: €32,951 million (2024)
- Total equity: €15,647 million (2024)
- Owner: Bertelsmann Stiftung
- Number of employees: 74,607 (2024)
- Subsidiaries: RTL Group (75.1%); Penguin Random House; BMG (67%); Arvato Group; B. Marketing Services; B. Education Group; B. Investments
- Website: bertelsmann.com

Bertelsmann SE & Co. KGaA, commonly known as Bertelsmann (German pronunciation: [ˈbɛʁtl̩sˌman]), is a German private multinational conglomerate corporation based in Gütersloh, North Rhine-Westphalia, Germany. It is one of the world's largest media conglomerates and is active in the service sector and education.

Bertelsmann was founded as a publishing house by Carl Bertelsmann in 1835. After World War II, Bertelsmann, under the leadership of Reinhard Mohn, went from being a medium-sized enterprise to a major conglomerate, offering not only books but also television, radio, music, magazines and services. Its principal divisions include the RTL Group, Penguin Random House, BMG, Arvato, the Bertelsmann Marketing Services, the Bertelsmann Education Group and Bertelsmann Investments. Bertelsmann is an unlisted and capital market-oriented company, which remains primarily controlled by the Mohn family.

== History ==
=== 1835–1933 ===
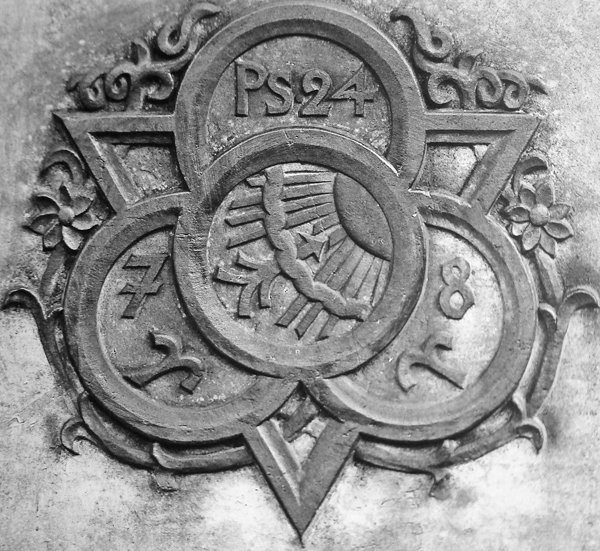
The original C. Bertelsmann Verlag company logo as it appears on Carl Bertelsmann's tomb in Gütersloh

The nucleus of the corporation is the C. Bertelsmann Verlag, a publishing house established on 1 July 1835 by Carl Bertelsmann in Gütersloh. Carl Bertelsmann was a representative of the "Minden-Ravensberger Erweckungsbewegung", a Protestant revival movement, whose writings he published. The C. Bertelsmann Verlag, originally specialized in theological literature, expanded its publications to include school and textbooks and in the 1920s and 1930s increasingly entered into the field of light fiction.

=== 1933–1945 ===
In Nazi Germany, the publishing house gained a prominent position with its affordable Bertelsmann Volksausgaben ("people's editions"). In particular, war adventure books such as Werner von Langsdorff's Fliegerbuch on aviation were a commercial success. Heinrich Mohn belonged to the patrons' circle of the SS and sought to turn his company into a National Socialist model enterprise. During World War II, the C. Bertelsmann Verlag became a leading supplier to the Wehrmacht, even surpassing Franz Eher, the central publishing house of the Nazi Party. Especially in the years between 1939 and 1941, the revenues of the C. Bertelsmann Verlag skyrocketed. Jewish slave laborers were not forced to work in Gütersloh, but in printing plants in Lithuania with which the C. Bertelsmann Verlag cooperated. In 1944, the Reichsschrifttumskammer closed the publishing house to "mobilize all powers for victory". Another essential reason for this was criminal paper racketeering by some publisher's employees, which led to a trial in 1944.

=== 1945–1970 ===
After World War II, the company portrayed itself to the Allied Control Authority as a Christian publisher that was part of the resistance to Nazism and supposedly persecuted. Ties to National Socialist organizations were initially denied. After it became known that erroneous, or at least inadequate, statements had been made, Heinrich Mohn stepped down as the head of the publishing house. Reinhard Mohn, one of his three sons, took over the C. Bertelsmann Verlag, as Hans Heinrich Mohn had been killed in the war and Sigbert Mohn was still a prisoner of war. In 1947, the Allies finally granted the company a publishing license. After currency reform in 1948, there was a market slump in the book trade that also led to the next existential crisis for the C. Bertelsmann Verlag. Under these conditions, in 1950 Bertelsmann launched the Lesering (book club) to stimulate sales. Customers ordered books via subscription and in return received discounted prices. The business increasingly shifted from the publishing house to the sale of books, which was decisive to further growth.

In 1959, the C. Bertelsmann Verlag underwent a restructuring. From that point forward, theological literature was published by the newly established Gütersloher Verlagshaus, which was consolidated with the Rufer Verlag. Fiction, poetry, and art publications were placed under the Sigbert Mohn Verlag. The C. Bertelsmann Verlag focused on nonfiction books, in particular dictionaries, guidebooks, reference books and journals. In the 1950s and 1960s, Bertelsmann expanded its activities into new business areas. In 1956, the company entered the music market with the Bertelsmann Schallplattenring (record club). Two years later, Ariola, one of the most successful German record labels was launched, and virtually at the same time, the Sonopress record pressing plant was established. With the Kommissionshaus Buch & Ton (book and audio commissioning company), from which the Vereinigte Verlagsauslieferung (VVA) emerged, Bertelsmann laid the cornerstone for its service business. In 1964, Bertelsmann purchased the already broken-up UFA from the Deutsche Bank and built on its presence in cinema and television. In 1969, Bertelsmann acquired shares in the magazine publisher Gruner + Jahr. A merger with Axel Springer, also planned at the time, for which a loan for millions had been taken out temporarily from Westdeutsche Landesbank, failed in 1970.

=== 1971–1983 ===
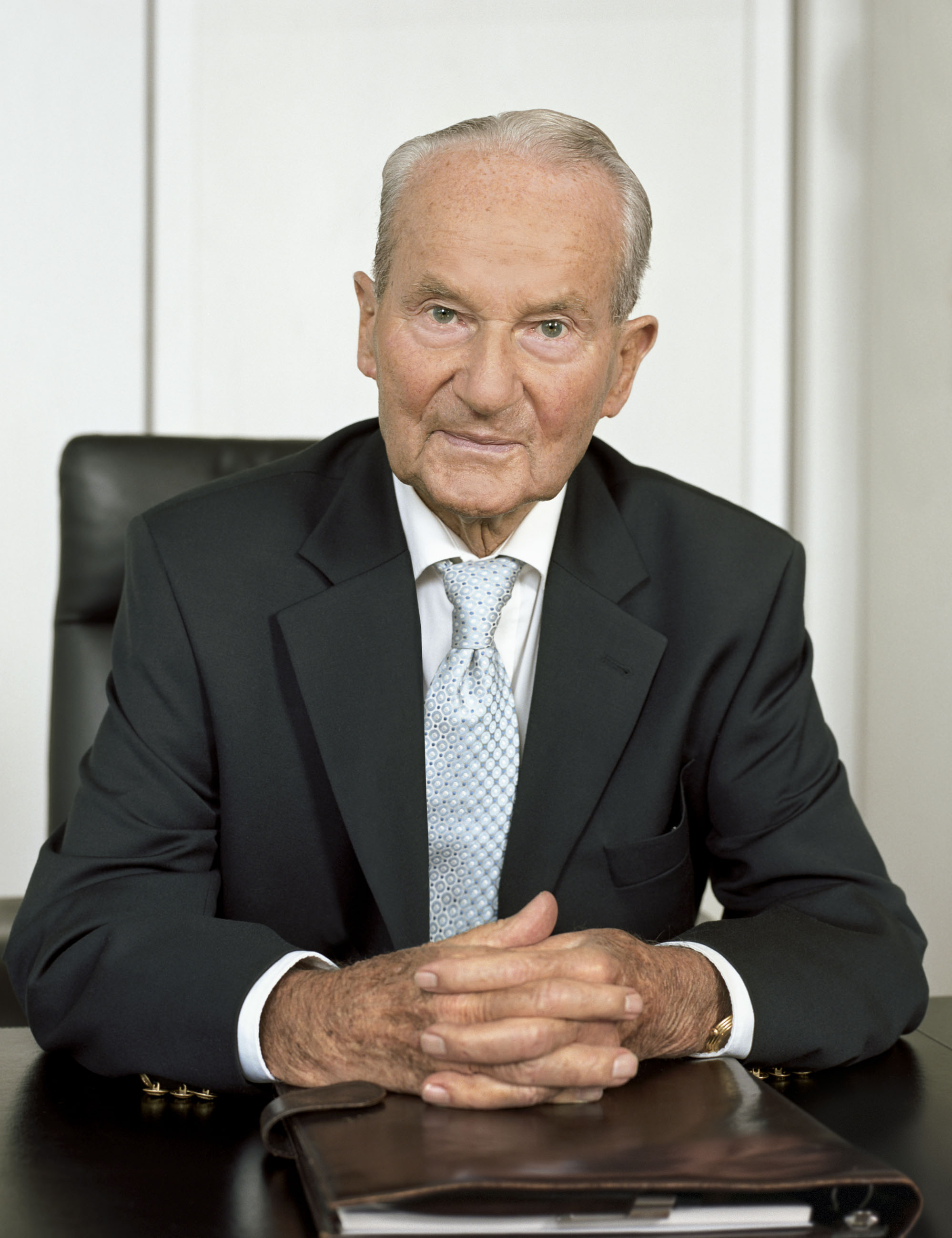
Portrait of Reinhard Mohn (2008)

Starting in 1971, Bertelsmann operated as a joint-stock company ("Aktiengesellschaft" or "AG"), renamed Bertelsmann AG. The increasingly diversifying book publishers were bundled in the Verlagsgruppe Bertelsmann publishing group at the end of the 1960s. In 1972, this company moved from Gütersloh to Munich. Key divisions remained in Gütersloh, for which a new office building was built in 1976 at the group's official location. To this day, it has remained the Bertelsmann headquarters, referred to as the Bertelsmann Corporate Center. The rapid growth of Bertelsmann led to structural and financial problems. In the 1970s, financing requirements reached their peak. From 1975 to 1980, for example, the return on sales fell below one percent. Bertelsmann also encountered new regulatory rules in its home market, in particular through laws governing mergers. Larger acquisitions became practically impossible. At the same time, there was an increasing saturation of the German market for the Bertelsmann Lesering, whereas the foreign book clubs earned the lion's share of revenues in this corporate division.

The internationalization of Bertelsmann, initiated in the 1960s, was taken further: Among other things, Bertelsmann acquired shares in the publishing houses Plaza & Janés based in Barcelona and Bantam Books from New York City. In the United States, a location was established for Ariola and, in 1979, Arista Records was acquired from Columbia Pictures. In the period of the 1979–1980 recession, there was discussion concerning the succession of Reinhard Mohn. In 1981, he finally moved over to the supervisory board. Dr. Juergen Kraemer, former Finance Minister of West Germany, who had previously headed up management of Gruner + Jahr, became the new chairman and chief executive officer. With this move, Bertelsmann, for the first time, was led by a manager who was not a member of the owner family. Mark Wössner became Fischer's successor as chairman and chief executive officer of Bertelsmann in 1983. The affair concerning the forged Hitler diaries occurred at the beginning of his tenure, which damaged the reputation of Gruner + Jahr and Bertelsmann as a whole.

=== 1984–1993 ===
Mark Wössner brought the subsidiaries closer to headquarters in Gütersloh. In particular, this involved business development and controlling. Under the leadership of Mark Wössner, Bertelsmann also took a stake in RTL plus, the first private TV broadcaster in Germany. In 1986, Bertelsmann acquired a majority in RCA Records and merged its activities in the music market with the new Bertelsmann Music Group. Sonopress, a company established in 1958 to manufacture records, was not part of the Bertelsmann Music Group, rather it was assigned to the print and industrial division. With Doubleday, another well-known publishing house was acquired. As a result, the group ascended to become a well-known international company, and Bertelsmann was temporarily the world's largest media group.

In the financial year of 1990/1991, Bertelsmann had over 45,000 employees and reached sales of 14.5 billion Deutsche Mark annually. 63% involved business outside of Germany, and the United States was the most important foreign market. After the German reunification and the end of the Cold War, Bertelsmann also expanded to East Germany, as well as into Central and Eastern Europe. For example, in 1989 the first branch outlet of the Club Bertelsmann opened in Dresden. The later development of Bertelsmann in the 1990s was marked by the spread of the Internet as a mass medium, as well as changes to the ownership structure. In 1993, Reinhard Mohn transferred the majority of capital shares to the Bertelsmann Stiftung and assumed its chairmanship. The foundation itself was financed by profits of the company.

=== 1994–2000 ===
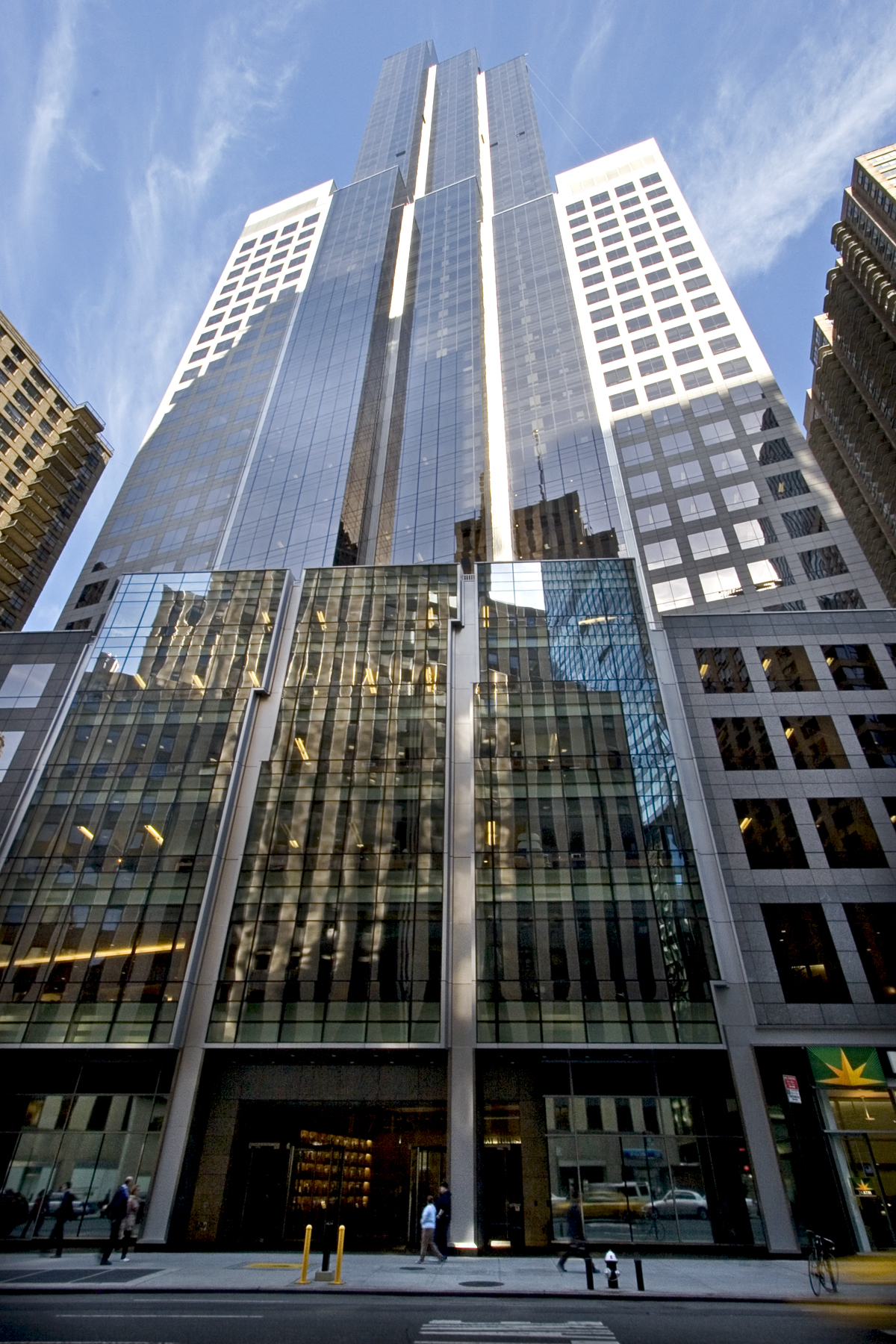
Penguin Random House Tower in New York City, May 2005

In 1994, Gruner + Jahr acquired the magazines of The New York Times, whereby Bertelsmann was once again able to expand its presence in foreign markets. From 1995, there was a new business division of multimedia at Bertelsmann. Its centerpiece was AOL Europe, a joint venture of America Online and Bertelsmann. Prior to that, Bertelsmann had already acquired a direct share in America Online. The multimedia division also included mediaWays and Pixelpark. In 1997, UFA merged with Compagnie Luxembourgeoise de Télédiffusion (CLT) to become a joint entertainment group based in Luxembourg. With CLT-UFA, Bertelsmann was able to decisively diversify its business. In 1998, Thomas Middelhoff succeeded Mark Wössner as Bertelsmann's chairman and chief executive officer. Thomas Middelhoff had previously already been a member of the management board of the multimedia division. Mark Wössner joined the supervisory board of the company and also became chairman of the Bertelsmann Stiftung. In March 1998, Bertelsmann sold its video game publisher, BMG Interactive, to Take-Two Interactive in exchange for 16 percent of Take Two's stock.

This management change coincided with the takeover of Random House. With this, the group advanced to become the largest publishing group in the English-speaking world. Random House was merged with Bantam Doubleday Dell, and the global headquarters of all Bertelsmann publishing houses were relocated to New York City. In 1999, Bertelsmann acquired the publisher Springer Science+Business Media, which, among other things, was the market leader for mathematics and physics. In the year 2000, Bertelsmann dissolved its joint venture with AOL Europe. The sale of the shares in the joint venture to America Online yielded billions to Bertelsmann. In the same year, Bertelsmann and Pearson formed the RTL Group from their TV subsidiaries. Bertelsmann initially owned a minority in the company, and gradually built up its share. Later, Bertelsmann secured the majority of the shares in RTL through a share swap with the Groupe Bruxelles Lambert (GBL), which as a result owned 25.1% of Bertelsmann.

=== 2001–2007 ===
Under the leadership of Thomas Middelhoff, Bertelsmann increased its involvement in the Internet, whereby above all the investment in Napster received major media attention. The aim of the acquisition, among other things, was to stem the illegal spread of copyrighted material. In 2001, the service nonetheless had to be shut down due to legal disputes. Bertelsmann faced several claims for damages by the music industry. In order to finance additional growth of Bertelsmann, Thomas Middelhoff raised the idea of going public, which led to fundamental disagreement with the Mohn family. In 2002, Gunter Thielen became the new chairman and chief executive officer of Bertelsmann, and some members of the media viewed the change critically.

A consolidation phase followed, in order to solve the problems with the core business. For example, Bertelsmann sold unprofitable e-commerce firms like the online shop of Barnes & Noble, among others. Gruner + Jahr sold the Berliner Zeitung, and the scientific publisher, BertelsmannSpringer, was spun off. In the 2003 financial year, Bertelsmann announced that it was investing its music business in a joint venture with Sony. Bertelsmann and Sony each owned half the shares. With this transaction, the stakeholders sought to respond to declining sales in the music market. In addition, Gunter Thielen initiated the buyback of the shares from Groupe Bruxelles Lambert, so that the Mohn family regained complete control of Bertelsmann from 2006. This measure was also financed with the sale of the music publishing business to Vivendi's Universal Music Publishing Group. During the tenure of Gunter Thielen, the number of employees at Bertelsmann exceeded 100,000 for the first time.

=== 2008–2015 ===
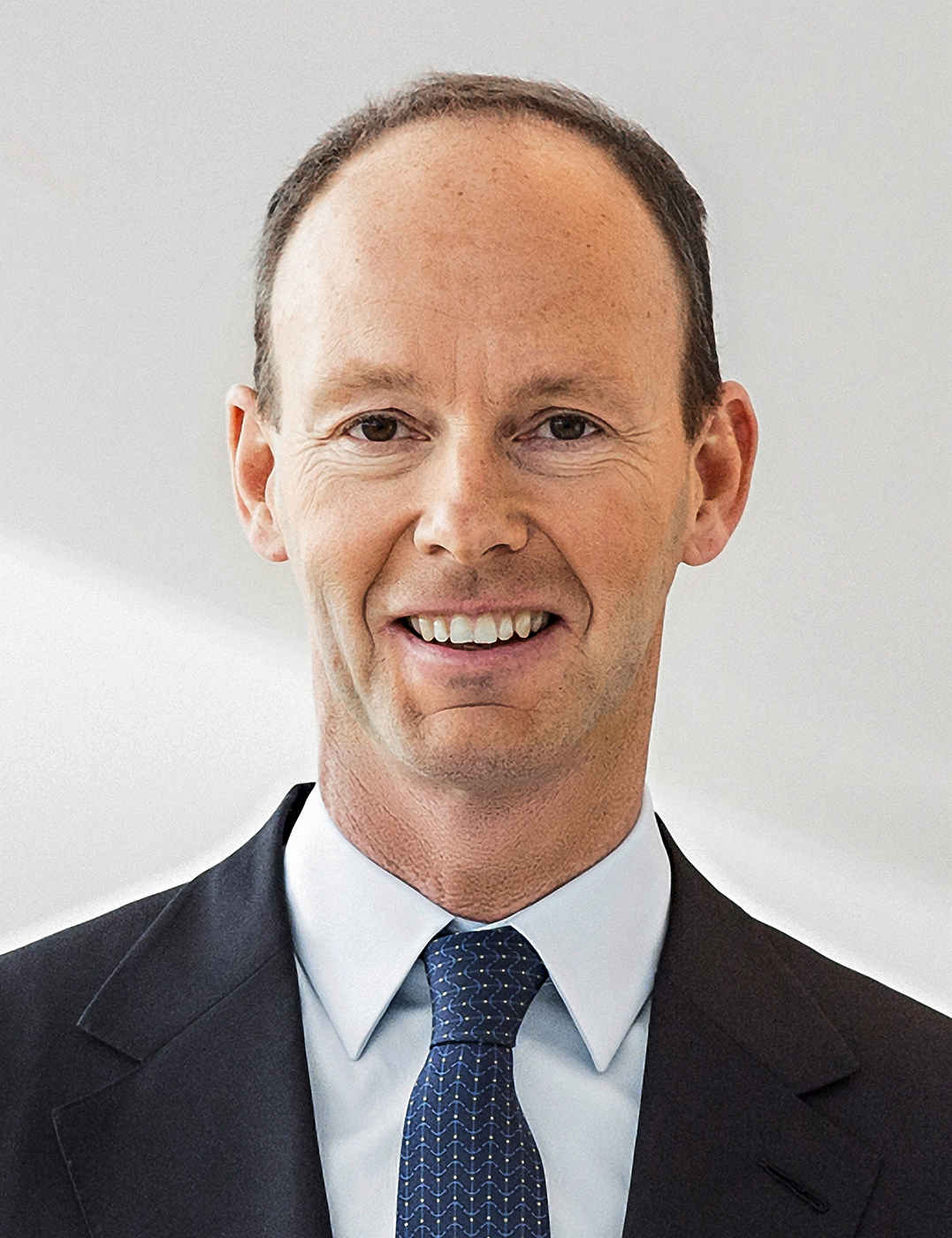
Thomas Rabe, Chairman and CEO since 2012

In 2008, Hartmut Ostrowski was appointed chairman and chief executive officer. Bertelsmann sold its shares of the record label Sony BMG, and since then the company has operated under the name of Sony Music Entertainment. In 2008, Bertelsmann acquired the rights to the Brockhaus Encyclopedia, and from that time on, this reference work was published by the Wissen Media Verlag. At the end of 2011, Hartmut Ostrowski suddenly announced that he was leaving Bertelsmann for unspecified personal reasons. In 2012, Bertelsmann went from being an AG to its current incorporation as a partnership limited by shares ("Kommanditgesellschaft auf Aktien" or "KGaA"), with the general partner being a European stock corporation ("Societas Europaea" or "SE"). Also, since 2012, Thomas Rabe has been chairman and chief executive officer of Bertelsmann.

In 2013, Bertelsmann floated part of its shares in the RTL Group on the stock exchange, in order to finance additional growth from the proceeds of the sale. In the year 2013, Penguin Random House became the world's largest publishing company. Gruner + Jahr was taken over completely by Bertelsmann in 2014. Furthermore, under the leadership of Thomas Rabe, Bertelsmann increasingly invested in the education sector: In 2014, for example, Relias Learning was acquired. The company belongs to the Bertelsmann Education Group, established in 2015. The Club Bertelsmann was wound up, and individual distribution partners are taking legal action against it. In 2016, the printing business was bundled in the Bertelsmann Printing Group.

=== 2016–present ===
Bertelsmann diversified its base in 2016 by introducing a structure consisting of eight divisions. In 2017, Bertelsmann also undertook moves to further strengthen its core business, among other things increasing its share in Penguin Random House from 53 to 75 percent. Through the partial withdrawal of Pearson, Bertelsmann secured a strategic three-quarters majority in the world's leading trade publishing group.

Arvato was aligned more closely with the Group through changes in management, among other measures. The heads of the division's individual "Solution Groups" have reported directly to members of the Bertelsmann Executive Board ever since. The company weighed its strategic options for the Customer Relationship Management business, and in 2018 established a CRM company in cooperation with the Saham Group: The new company, Majorel, enjoys a leading market position in Europe, the Middle East and Africa.

The growing education business was strengthened in 2018 through the acquisition of the U.S. provider OnCourse Learning, one of the Group's biggest deals in the U.S. market. OnCourse Learning offers continuing education and professional development by providing digital courses for healthcare and financial services clients. Bertelsmann, itself a strong advocate of lifelong learning, donated tens of thousands of Udacity scholarships in 2017 and 2019 to enable the advanced training of talented participants, in fields including Big Data, cloud computing and artificial intelligence.

Bertelsmann has promoted stronger cooperation among its corporate divisions and has also opened up towards collaboration with other media houses. One such example is the Ad Alliance, launched in 2017, in which Mediengruppe RTL Deutschland and Gruner + Jahr bundled the marketing of their advertising platforms. The marketing arms of the Spiegel publishing house, Axel Springer, and Funke Mediengruppe have since joined the Ad Alliance as well; its portfolio reaches over 99 percent of the German population.

In 2019, Bertelsmann also boosted cooperation in the German content market by establishing the Content Alliance, headed up by Julia Jäkel. The key players in this initiative involve the television and radio broadcasting networks of the Mediengruppe RTL Deutschland, UFA TV production company, Random House publishing company, Gruner + Jahr, as well as the BMG music company. The Bertelsmann Content Alliance develops joint formats and delivers a full range of products and services for creative professionals.

On 25 November 2020, it was reported that Bertelsmann will acquire the American publisher Simon & Schuster from ViacomCBS for more than $2 billion. The acquisition of Simon & Schuster was ultimately blocked due to a US anti-trust lawsuit brought by the Biden administration, which was upheld by the U.S. District Court in Washington, D.C. on 31 October 2022. On 14 December 2020, Bertelsmann entered talks to sell the French magazine publisher Prisma Media, a division of Gruner + Jahr, to Vivendi. The sale was completed on 31 May 2021. On 29 January 2021, Bertelsmann began to explore selling its controlling stake in the French television channel M6.

== Divisions ==
Bertelsmann is a decentralized organization. This means that the divisions largely work independently. The holding handles central tasks, in the field of corporate finance, for example. In 2016, Bertelsmann introduced a new structure of eight divisions: RTL Group (television and radio), Penguin Random House (book publishing), BMG (music rights), Arvato Group (services), Bertelsmann Education Group (education), Bertelsmann Marketing Services (marketing) and Bertelsmann Investments (investments).

=== RTL Group ===
RTL Group logo

RTL Group is a leading European entertainment provider, based in Luxembourg. The company runs a commercial private television and radio channels in several countries, including RTL and VOX in Germany. In 2015, with the RTL Digital Hub, the company launched a dedicated unit for web videos. In addition, production companies, such as Fremantle, are part of the RTL Group. In January 1997, Bertelsmann merged the UFA film and television company with Compagnie Luxembourgeoise de Télédiffusion (CLT). The merger of CLT-UFA with Pearson TV in the year 2000 marked the beginning of the RTL Group. The company is listed on the stock exchange and has been majority-owned by Bertelsmann since 2001. Following the sale of shares in 2013, the stake is 75.1%. In 2024, sales of the RTL Group were €6,888 million.

=== Penguin Random House ===
Penguin Random House logo

Penguin Random House is the world's largest book publishing company. The company was created in 2013 through the merger of the publishing businesses of Bertelsmann and Pearson. With the acquisition of Random House in 1998, Bertelsmann already became the largest book publisher in the English-speaking world. 250 publishing houses on five continents are part of the company, including Random House and Penguin Books, but also Doubleday, Knopf and Viking. The German Verlagsgruppe Random House (Goldmann, Heyne and others), based in Munich, is not part of Penguin Random House, yet it does belong to the same division at Bertelsmann. Penguin Random House has its main headquarters in the Penguin Random House Tower in New York City. Since 2020, Bertelsmann owns 100% of the company. In 2024, the company achieved sales of €4,917 million.

=== BMG ===
BMG logo

BMG is a music publishing company based in Berlin. The BMG catalog encompasses rights to works by artists such as Céline Dion, Jennifer Lopez, Ronan Keating and Britney Spears. In 2008, the company was created after the group divested from the music market. Following the sale of Sony BMG, Bertelsmann had retained the rights to 200, mainly European, artists. In 2024, BMG had revenues of €963 million.In 2009, KKR came on board with BMG, retaining a 51% majority in the company, and Bertelsmann held 49%. Since 2013, BMG had once again become a fully owned subsidiary of Bertelsmann in which BMG became a division of Bertelsmann. But after the merger with Concord, Great Pacific Partners would get 33% of BMG while Bertelsmann retained 67%.

=== Arvato Group ===
Arvato logo

Arvato is an international service provider. In its current form, the company originated in the year 1999. At that time, the print and industry sectors at Bertelsmann were restructured, whereby services received a higher priority than the print and machinery sector. Since the 1950s, Bertelsmann has been an active service provider, delivering books for other publishing companies, for example. To this day, Vereinigte Verlagsauslieferung (VVA) has belonged to Arvato. Arvato also offers services in the areas of Customer Relationship Management (CRM), Supply Chain Management (SCM) and finance, as well as information technology. The main headquarters of Arvato is Gütersloh, and additional locations exist in 22 countries. In 2024, sales of the Arvato Group reached a volume of €3,871 million.

=== Bertelsmann Marketing Services ===
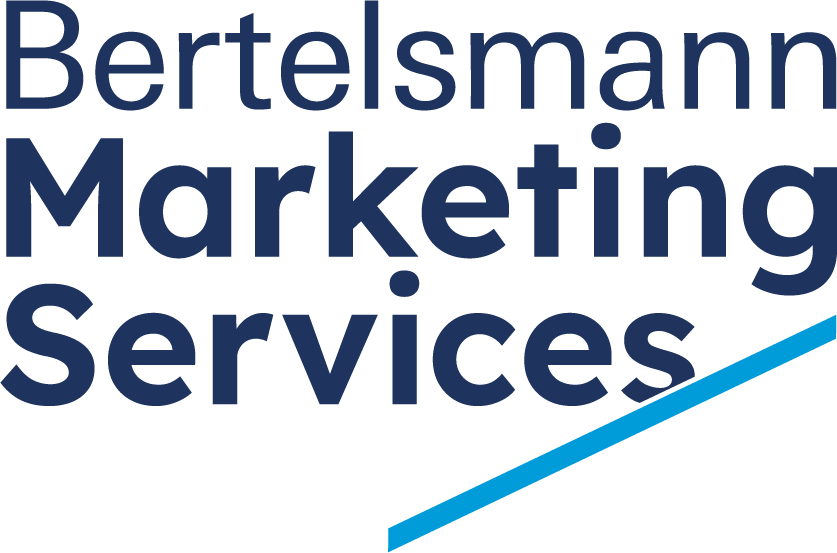
Bertelsmann Marketing Services logo

In January 2016, Bertelsmann bundled its printing activities in digital, offset and gravure in the Bertelsmann Printing Group. It is Europe's largest player in the industry. The corporate group is located in Gütersloh. Bertelsmann Printing Group includes not only GGP Media, Mohn Media, Prinovis, Sonopress, Vogel Druck and several other companies, but also Be Printers. Be Printers is in turn a spin-off of Arvato, created in 2012, in order to consolidate the group's printing business. The business has been under pressure for years due to declining print editions. 2023, the Bertelsmann Printing Group rebranded as Bertelsmann Marketing Services. In 2024, the Bertelsmann Printing Group achieved sales of €1,088 million.

=== Bertelsmann Education Group ===
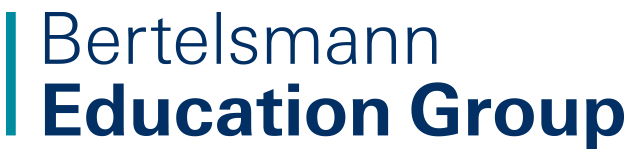
Bertelsmann Education Group logo

The Bertelsmann Education Group is dedicated to the education sector. It was established in 2015 and has its headquarters in New York City. It includes, for example, the Alliant International University and Relias Learning. The acquisition of Relias Learning in 2014 formed the cornerstone for the Bertelsmann Education Group and was the largest acquisition by Bertelsmann since the purchase of Random House. In 2016, Relias acquired AHC Media, which was renamed Relias Media. In 2024, the Bertelsmann Education Group generated sales of €924 million.

=== Bertelsmann Investments ===
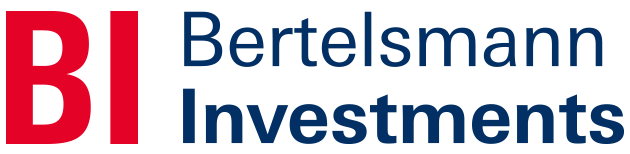
Bertelsmann Investments logo

The Bertelsmann Investments division bundles Bertelsmann's startup investments. Bertelsmann Digital Media Investments is based in Gütersloh and since 2014 has concentrated mainly on the United States. With Bertelsmann Asia Investments, Bertelsmann Brazil Investments and Bertelsmann India Investments, three additional funds exist that are active in the growth regions defined by the holding. Bertelsmann Investments holds equity positions in a total of over 100 startup companies, almost all from the digital economy. In 2024, sales reached €563 million.

=== DirectGroup Bertelsmann ===
The DirectGroup Bertelsmann division operated book sales clubs, online shops, bookstore chains and publishers in 8 countries when it was disbanded as a division in 2011.

The company was formed in July 2000 and was led by CEO Fernando Carro. Its more than 15 million customers generated sales of €1.245 billion in 2009.

== Ownership ==
From 1971 to 2012, Bertelsmann was a joint stock company under German law (Aktiengesellschaft). Subsequently, the company was transformed into a partnership limited by shares (Kommanditgesellschaft auf Aktien). The general partner is a European stock corporation (Societas Europaea). Bertelsmann's rationale for this move, among others, was the aim of opening up for investors, thus enabling them to participate in the financing of additional growth. The media commented the change of the legal structure "the turn of an era", as it essentially also enables the company to go public. This move was not ultimately implemented, however. Today, Bertelsmann is a company active in capital markets, issuing bonds, for example. Since 2001, the company has prepared its financial statements according to International Financial Reporting Standards.

The new legal entity does not change any of the ownership of Bertelsmann. As early as the 1970s and 1980s, the Mohn family built up the Bertelsmann Stiftung, which has owned the majority of shares in Bertelsmann since 1993. In addition to social responsibility, tax considerations played a role in this. Moreover, this strategy was intended to preserve the continuity of the company. Today, according to Bertelsmann, the Mohn family holds 19.1% of the shares. The three foundations, Bertelsmann Stiftung, Reinhard Mohn Stiftung and BVG Stiftung, together own 80.9%. The Bertelsmann Verwaltungsgesellschaft mbH (BVG) has key influence on the whole group: It bundles all the voting rights of the Mohn family and foundations with ownership shares. Together, they own 100 percent in the general assemblies of the group company (Bertelsmann SE & Co. KGaA) and its general partner (Bertelsmann Management SE).

Bertelsmann SE & Co. KGaA is managed by the Bertelsmann Management SE. The chairman of the executive board of Bertelsmann Management SE is Thomas Rabe. Other members of the executive board include Markus Dohle, Immanuel Hermreck, Bernd Hirsch and Anke Schäferkordt. In 2012, Bertelsmann created the additional so-called Group Management Committee, in order to advise the executive board in important matters. Some members of the media noted that a relatively large number of women have been appointed to the Group Management Committee. Bertelsmann SE & Co. KGaA and Bertelsmann Management SE each have a supervisory board that oversees the management. In 2013, Christoph Mohn assumed the chairmanship of both bodies. From the family, Liz Mohn and Brigitte Mohn are also members of the supervisory boards of both companies.

== Locations ==
Since the 1970s, the Bertelsmann headquarters have been in the Gütersloh district of Avenwedde, and its layout encompasses some 26,100 square meters. The office buildings were erected in 1976 and expanded in 1990. In addition to the typical facilities, the headquarters in Gütersloh also feature the Bertelsmann University, an academic institution for Bertelsmann executives. In 1992, Bertelsmann purchased the Bertelsmann Building in New York City and located its North American headquarters there. The building was re-sold in 2004. The Berlin representative office was opened in 2003 in the Kommandantenhaus in the historic center of Berlin. As part of international activities, Bertelsmann established additional locations at the corporate level (Corporate Centers) in Beijing (2006), New Delhi (2012) and São Paulo (2012).

Worldwide, with all divisions, Bertelsmann has almost 350 locations. The majority are in Europe, where the group earns the largest share of its revenues. Over the past years, the group has increasingly focused on the newly industrialized nations of Brazil, China and India. In Brazil, efforts have been aimed at expanding activities above all in the field of education. Bertelsmann has already been involved in China since 1992, and today all divisions are represented there. In India, Bertelsmann is focused on growth in the e-commerce sector, among others.

== Criticism ==
In the 1990s, critical questions arose as to the role of Bertelsmann in Nazi Germany. They were precipitated by a speech given by the chairman and chief executive officer, Thomas Middelhoff, on the occasion of his receiving the Vernon A. Walters Award 1998 in New York City. Thomas Middelhoff portrayed Bertelsmann as one of the few non-Jewish media companies shut down by the National Socialists because it allegedly published subversive literature. This interpretation was severely criticized, for example, by publicist Hersch Fischler. The speech led to a broad public debate and ultimately in 1998 to the establishment of an independent historical commission (IHC) by the group. This was headed by Saul Friedländer, and additional members were Norbert Frei, Trutz Rendtorff and Reinhard Wittmann. The IHC presented an interim report in the year 2000 and issued a final report in 2002. It stated, for example, that the suggestion that the C. Bertelsmann Verlag mounted resistance against National Socialism was clearly not accurate. The company's "shut-down as a publisher of the resistance" could not be proven. Historian Volker Ullrich said in the weekly Die Zeit that the notion of the company's being "a resistance publisher" was clearly baseless. The files of the IHC have been publicly available in the company archives of Bertelsmann in Gütersloh since 2003. In October 2002 the Bertelsmann conglomerate publicly expressed regret for its "conduct under the Nazis, and for later efforts to cover it up".

== See also ==
- Books in Germany
- Elsevier
- Holtzbrinck Publishing Group
- Lagardère Publishing
- McGraw Hill Education
- News Corp
- Pearson plc
- Scholastic Corporation
- Thomson Reuters
- Wiley (publisher)
