= Gruner + Jahr =

German publishing house

Gruner + Jahr GmbH
- Type: Subsidiary
- Genre: Publishing house
- Founded: 30 June 1965; 61 years ago
- Founder: Richard Gruner; John Jahr; Gerd Bucerius
- Headquarters: Hamburg, Germany
- Area served: Worldwide
- Key people: Stephan Schäfer (CEO); Oliver Radtke (COO)
- Products: Newspapers, magazines, digital services
- Revenue: ▼€1.1 billion (2020)
- Net income: ▼€127 million (2020)
- Number of employees: ▼8,777 (2020)
- Parent: RTL Deutschland
- Website: www.guj.de

Gruner + Jahr GmbH was a publishing house headquartered in Hamburg, Germany. Since the purchase by RTL Germany it is operational by the name RTL Deutschland.

The company was founded in 1965 by Richard Gruner, John Jahr, and Gerd Bucerius. From 1969 to 1973, Bertelsmann acquired a majority share in the company and gradually increased it over time. After 2014, the company was a fully owned subsidiary of the Gütersloh-based media and services group. Under the leadership and innovation strategy of Julia Jäkel, Gruner + Jahr evolved into a publishing house producing cross-channel media products for the digital society.

With formely more than 500 magazines and digital products and services, Gruner + Jahr was one of Europe's largest premium magazine publishing companies in the 1990this. Its activities primarily focus on Germany and France. Among the most well-known media brands are Brigitte, Capital, Geo, and Stern, along with Chefkoch.de and Stern.de. In addition, Gruner + Jahr owns a share in Spiegel Verlag.

In August 2021, RTL Deutschland announced the acquisition of Gruner + Jahr for €230 million euros. The deal was completed on January 11, 2022, from which point the Gruner + Jahr became a brand of the RTL Deutschland group. The company was later renamed RTL Publishing.

== History ==
=== 1965–1969 ===
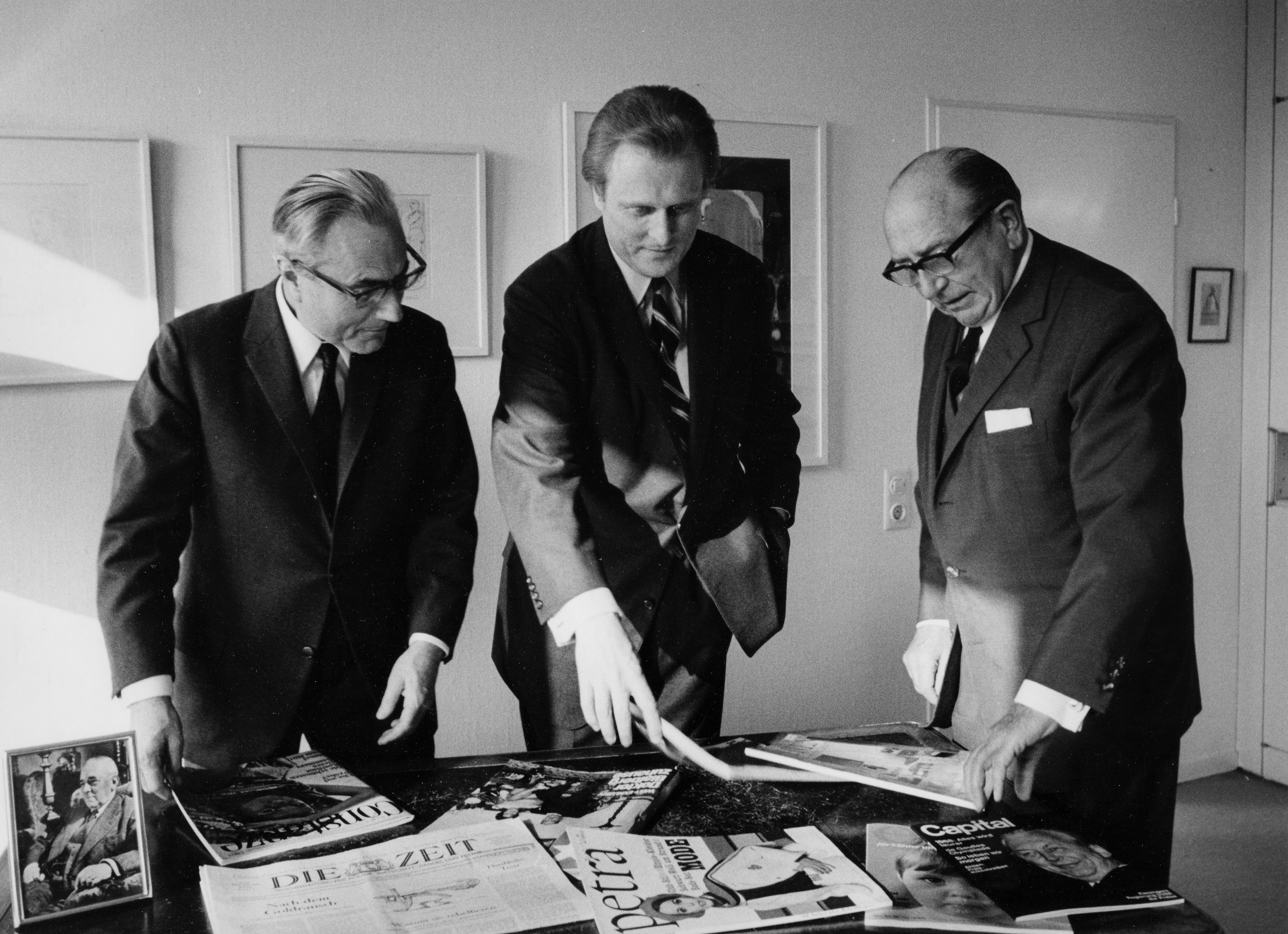
Gerd Bucerius, Richard Gruner, and John Jahr in 1968

Gruner + Jahr was founded in 1965 by Richard Gruner, John Jahr, and Gerd Bucerius. Bucerius and Jahr published magazines, and Gruner ran a printing firm. The impetus for the three entrepreneurs to merge was the need to achieve positive economies of scale, for example with regard to purchasing paper for the printing firms or to the distribution of magazines via reading circles. The merger was promoted mainly by Gerd Bucerius, and the magazines that the shareholders brought into the company formed the basis for the joint business of Gruner + Jahr. The key magazines were, among others, Brigitte, Capital, Stern, and Schöner Wohnen. By 1965, they had a joint circulation running into the millions. The company Gruner + Jahr was established as a limited liability partnership, in which Gruner held 39.5%, Jahr 32.3%, and Bucerius 28.2% of the shares. By 1968, sales had grown to over 400 million Deutsche Mark. This made Gruner + Jahr Germany's largest press company at the time, next to Axel Springer.

In 1969, Richard Gruner stepped down from the company. Differences concerning the political and strategic orientation of the publishing house prompted this move. Gruner gave up his shares to his co-shareholders, Bucerius and Jahr, who for a short time each owned 50%. Both subsequently sold 25% of Gruner + Jahr to Bertelsmann. In 1970, Bucerius and Jahr transitioned into the newly created supervisory board, and management responsibility was entrusted to a five-person executive board. In 1971, with a view to strengthening the management's independence, the company converted the general partner (shareholder with unlimited liability) of Gruner + Jahr into a stock corporation. Following his retirement from the operative business, in 1973 Bucerius swapped his shares in Gruner + Jahr for an equity stake in Bertelsmann. As a result, the group advanced to become the majority shareholder in Gruner + Jahr, and, by 1975, Bertelsmann had increased its share to a total of 74.9%. Upon the retirement of Bucerius, the rights to the weekly newspaper Die Zeit were transferred to a foundation in order to safeguard the publication's business independence over the long term.

=== 1960s, 70s and 80s ===
In the 1960s and 1970s, the business of Gruner + Jahr was initially focused on expanding activities in the German market. An example of this was the acquisition of minority shareholdings in Spiegel Verlag and Vereinigte Motor-Verlage (today Motor Presse Stuttgart) in the year 1971. At the end of the 1970s, the company then embarked on a period of expansion abroad: In France, the subsidiary Participations Edition Presse (today Prisma Media) was established in 1978, and that same year, Gruner + Jahr acquired the Spanish publishing company Cosmos Distribuidora and the US printing firm Brown Printing. In the 1980s, additional shareholdings and subsidiaries were acquired abroad, for example in Great Britain.

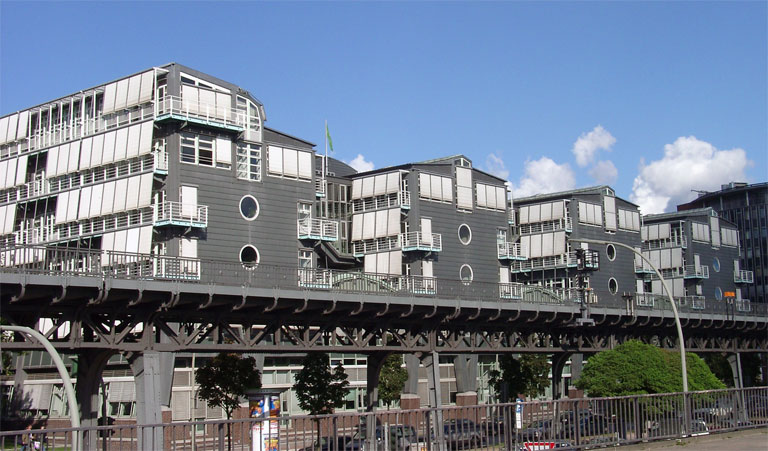
Pressehaus am Baumwall, 2004

By the mid-1980s, the employees of Gruner + Jahr were spread throughout various buildings along Hamburg's Outer Alster Lake. To promote collaboration within the publishing house and to create space for additional staff, construction of a press building on Baumwall began in 1985. The company's headquarters remain at that address to this day. The property on which the press building was built is situated between St. Michael's Church and the Speicherstadt. It was previously owned by the City of Hamburg and has floor space of 22,000 m². Construction work was largely completed in 1989, and the first employees moved into the press building one year later. The building project cost roughly 300 million Deutsche Mark. At the time the press building was commissioned, it offered space for 2,000 employees and was thus Hamburg's largest inner-city office block.

=== 1990s ===
Following the German reunification in 1989/90, Gruner + Jahr was instrumental in building up a free press in the new German states. For example, the company founded the Dresdner Morgenpost and, shortly thereafter, the Chemnitzer Morgenpost daily newspaper. In 1991, Gruner + Jahr acquired the Sächsisches Druck- und Verlagshaus, where the Sächsische Zeitung is published. The company also acquired a stake in Berliner Verlag – initially 50% in 1990, then 100% from 1992 on. Among its leading newspapers are Berliner Zeitung and Berliner Kurier. Internationally, Gruner + Jahr attracted a lot of attention by acquiring seven magazines belonging to The New York Times Company. In 1994, the company advanced to become a leading US publishing house and, for the first time in its history, generated half of its sales revenues outside of Germany.

In 1995, Gruner + Jahr launched websites under the domains geo.de, mopo.de, pm-magazin.de, stern.de and tvtoday.de as one of the first professional service providers on the world wide web. In the years that followed, digital business models assumed an ever-greater importance: In 1997, the company launched Fireball, a search engine specially geared towards German-language content. This was followed by Paperball in 1998, a search engine specializing in news. An e-mail provider (Firemail) was also part of the portfolio. In the year 2000, Gruner + Jahr incorporated Fireball and its related brands into Lycos Europe. In exchange, Gruner + Jahr received a stake in the company, the IPO of which was imminent. From the end of 2000, following the bursting of the dot-com bubble, Gruner + Jahr once again concentrated on content-based services, that is, on the websites of its media brands.

=== Initiatives and crisis ===
At around the turn of the millennium, Gruner + Jahr sold off several regional daily newspapers. In 1999, the company divested itself of the Zeitung zum Sonntag, a free Sunday newspaper. The deficit-ridden Hamburger Morgenpost was sold in 1999 to Hans Barlach and Frank Otto. In addition, Gruner + Jahr divested itself of several regional editions of the Sächsische Zeitung. At the same time, the company established Financial Times Deutschland, a new Germany-wide business newspaper. This initiative was one of the most ambitious newspaper projects of the time. In the year 2000, Gruner + Jahr purchased Inc. and Fast Company, two leading business magazines.

In 2002, Gruner + Jahr sold the Berliner Verlag publishing company to the Georg von Holtzbrinck publishing group. Due to the concentration in the Berlin newspaper market, some media commented critically on the transaction. In 2003, Gruner + Jahr sold off parts of its newspaper business in Eastern Europe to the Ringier group.

After selling Berliner Verlag, Gruner + Jahr once again focused on its business with magazines and printing firms. In mid-2003, the company began developing various new magazines, with Neon and Brigitte Woman among its new German market launches.

Gruner + Jahr continued to expand, despite an increasingly difficult market environment. The company further pursued this strategy in the years that followed and planned additional acquisitions, but prescribed a regimen of belt-tightening in Germany and the United States. In 2004, Gruner + Jahr, in cooperation with Arvato and Axel Springer, founded the printing service provider Prinovis. One year later, in 2005, Gruner + Jahr sold off its entire US business to Meredith Corporation, and Condé Nast acquired one individual youth magazine. The company thus largely exited the US market, where, up to that time, it had been the sixth-largest magazine publisher.

Due to the 2008 financial crisis, from 2007 Gruner + Jahr was forced to close several magazines. The company was economically healthy and debt-free, yet it was combating declining ad revenues. Irrespective of this trend, Gruner + Jahr introduced new magazines onto the market. Following the losses of the previous year, the company returned to the profit zone in 2010. As part of strategic transformation activities, the executive board was restructured, and in 2013, Julia Jäkel became Chief Executive Officer (CEO). Whereas the digital business sector became more and more important, printing operations waned in significance: After Prinovis announced in 2013 that the former Gruner printing company in Itzehoe would be closing, Gruner + Jahr divested itself of its US subsidiary Brown Printing in 2014. This meant a "turning point" for the company because it marked the selling off of the company's last operative business in the United States.

=== Bertelsmann era ===
In 2014, Bertelsmann came to an agreement with the heirs of John Jahr concerning the purchase of their remaining shares of 25.1%. The takeover was intended to signify a commitment to journalism. Bertelsmann thus strengthened its journalism business, especially through the established media brands of Gruner + Jahr. The executive board of Gruner + Jahr was confirmed and the company re-introduced the legal entity used up until 1971 (limited partnership). Gruner + Jahr then intensified its cooperation with other Bertelsmann companies. Territory is an example for this strategic shift.

Over the past few years, Gruner + Jahr, under the leadership of Julia Jäkel, has been vastly transformed and strategically repositioned. In 2016, Gruner + Jahr sold its magazine business in Spain to an investor and withdrew from Austria. By expanding digital activities and innovation in the area of traditional magazines, Gruner + Jahr's business has continued its successful expansion. The company has expanded its digital services and developed into one of the key market players in digital marketing.

Furthermore, in 2017, the marketing arm of Gruner + Jahr in cooperation with the RTL-subsidiary IP Deutschland and Smartclip, established the Ad Alliance, under the umbrella of which new services have been developed for advertisers and agencies. The Ad Alliance's cross-media platform reaches more than 99% of the German population monthly, and Spiegel Media and Media Impact have now also joined it.

In 2017, Gruner + Jahr announced it was moving to HafenCity and building new headquarters. The modern new building, will reflect the innovation strategy being pursued by Gruner + Jahr. The press building at Baumwall was sold to the city, which wants to use it for its own purposes after Gruner + Jahr's move has been completed.

French media conglomerate Vivendi acquired Prisma Media from Bertelsmann in 2020 and later the company spun-out its publishing operation (including Prisma Media) into Louis Hachette Group in 2024.

=== Transition and integration into RTL ===
By August 2021, RTL Deutschland announced the acquisition of Gruner + Jahr for €230 million euros. The deal was completed on January 11, 2022, from which point the Gruner + Jahr became a brand of the RTL Deutschland group.

A core portofilio of the main G+J magazines suvived: Der Stern, Capital, Geo, Art, Brigitte and Gala, Schöner Wohnen, Häuser and Couch. As digital only: Chefkoch and Eltern. Some magazines have been canceld or sold, like 11Freunde to Spiegel, Business Punk to Weimer Media, P.M. to GeraNova Bruckmann and Landleben to Landwirtschaftsverlag and DMM.

The iconic G+J press building at Hamburg’s Baumwall has been vacated. The Hamburg teams have relocated to HafenCity (Koreastraße), where they are now based alongside other RTL divisions.

== Last Corporate structure ==
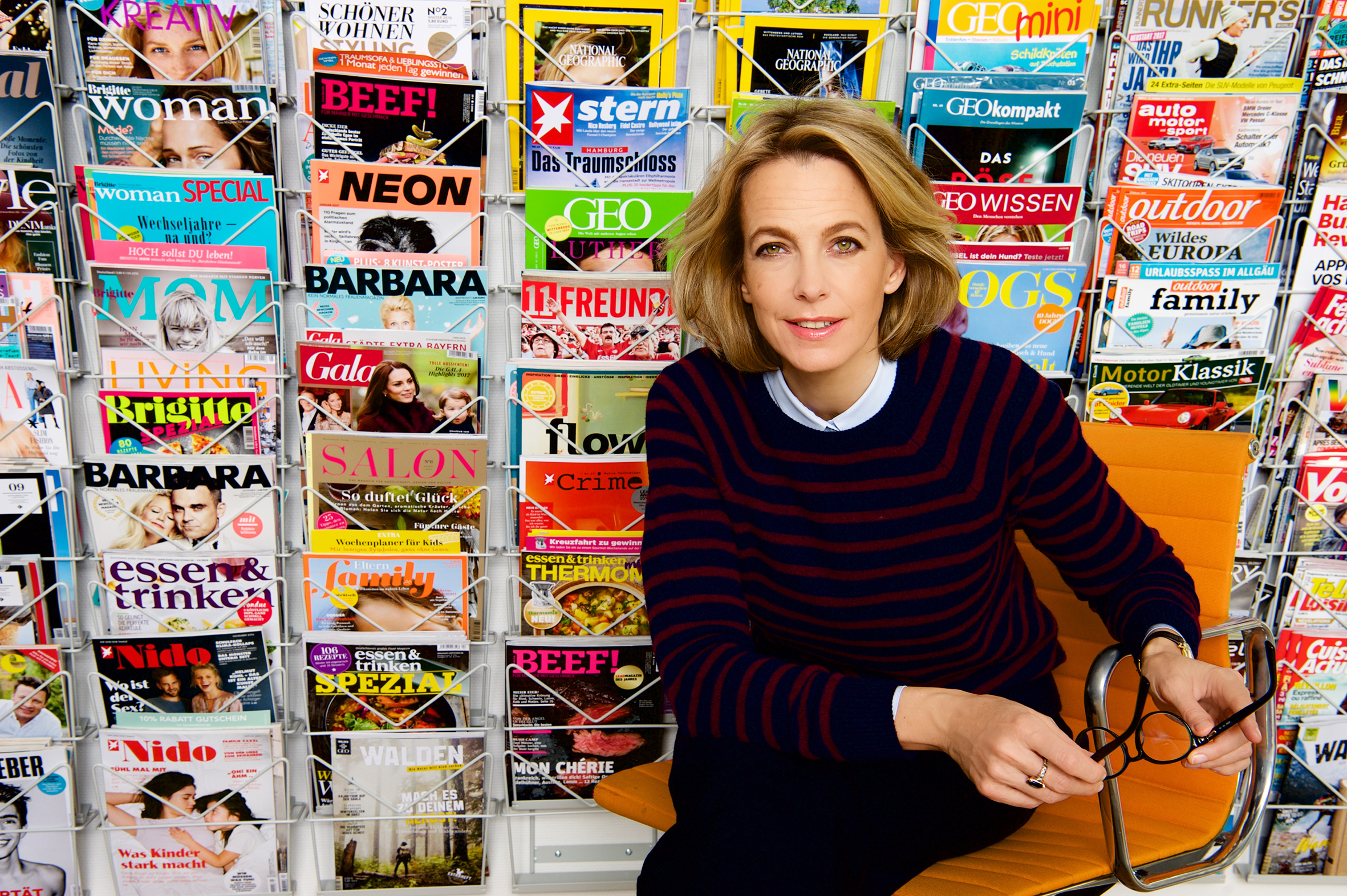
Julia Jäkel, 2017

The group holding company is Gruner + Jahr GmbH, headquartered in Hamburg. It is a limited liability company (GmbH) under German law, and its shareholders are Bertelsmann SE & Co. KGaA, as well as two holding companies which are also part of the Bertelsmann Group. Three people sit on the executive board of Gruner + Jahr GmbH: Julia Jäkel is Chief Executive Officer (CEO), Oliver Radtke is Chief Operating Officer (COO), and Stephan Schäfer is Chief Product Officer (CPO). Their contracts were last renewed in 2018 for five years.

Gruner + Jahr is one of eight corporate divisions of Bertelsmann. The annual financial statements are included in the consolidated financial statements, and not separately published. In the 2020 business year, Gruner + Jahr achieved sales of 1.1 billion euros. Gruner + Jahr owns companies and hold equity participation in several companies in Germany and abroad, including Prisma Media, for example.

== Products and services ==
=== Magazines ===
The most important German-language magazines of Gruner + Jahr in terms of popularity and scope were Brigitte, Capital, Eltern, Eltern family, Essen & Trinken, Essen & Trinken für jeden Tag, National Geographic Deutschland, P.M. Magazin, Schöner Wohnen, and Stern. Since 2013, all publications from Gruner + Jahr were clustered into eight units called "Communities of Interest." Both print and digital cross-media content were created there.

=== Digital brands ===
Up from 2000, Gruner + Jahr had significantly increased its digital activities. In its core markets, digital sales account for more than a third of total sales. Gruner + Jahr invested in own platforms but also in the services of third parties: For example, a start-up fund was launched in 2015, and in 2016, an online shop was created under the Schöner Wohnen brand. The ad-tech company AppLike, established in 2016, was spun off in 2017 thanks to its strong growth.

== Other ==
=== Nannen Prize ===
In 2004, Gruner + Jahr joined forces with Stern to create the Henri Nannen Prize, which since 2016 has been referred to simply as the Nannen Prize. The award honors outstanding journalistic achievements in categories such as reporting, documentation, and photography. The role model for the Henri Nannen Prize was the Egon Erwin Kisch Prize, created in 1977 by Henri Nannen. It developed into one of the most renowned journalism prizes in the German-speaking region and today is continued as a category of the Nannen Prize. Peter Scholl-Latour was the first journalist and author to receive the Henri Nannen Prize in 2005 for his life's work as a journalist. Other laureates have included former German Chancellor Helmut Schmidt (2010). Gruner + Jahr regularly honors special achievements in the service of press freedom with a special award, which Laura Poitras received in 2014 for her involvement in the uncovering of the global surveillance and spying affair by Edward Snowden.

=== Henri Nannen School ===
Gruner + Jahr did not train journalists in the 1960s and 70s. In 1978, this changed: The Henri Nannen School was established, modeled after the German School of Journalism. It was initially called the Hamburg School of Journalism and, in 1983, received the name it bears today, in honor of the Stern founder, Henri Nannen. Wolf Schneider was integrally involved in its founding and served as its director for 16 years. Today, the Henri-Nannen School is based in Hamburg's Kontorhaus Stubbenhuk. The school provides training for newspaper, magazine, radio, television, and online journalists across various genres. The Henri Nannen School is a limited liability company, backed up by the Gruner + Jahr, Die Zeit and Der Spiegel publishing houses.

== Controversy ==
In 1983, the company was clouded by the affair surrounding the alleged Hitler diaries. The affair was to go down in history as Stern's greatest ever miscalculation and caused significant damage to the public image of Gruner + Jahr and Bertelsmann. Stern magazine subsequently suffered a severe decline in circulation, which proved to be only temporary, however. Gruner + Jahr and Bertelsmann responded with severe personnel consequences. For example, the magazine's publisher, Henri Nannen, was forced to resign, even though he personally had done nothing wrong. Today, the publishing of the alleged Hitler diaries is considered a textbook example of failure in the field of media ethics.

In 2013, Gruner + Jahr announced it would be handing over the forged Hitler diaries to the German Federal Archives. To date, this has not occurred; the forged Hitler diaries are still archived in the Gruner + Jahr publishing house.
