= Puls 8 =

- Country: Switzerland
- Broadcast area: Switzerland
- Headquarters: Zürich, Switzerland

Programming
- Language: German
- Picture format: 576i (16:9 SDTV); 1080i (HDTV)

Ownership
- Owner: ProSiebenSat.1 Media
- Sister channels: ProSieben Schweiz; ProSieben Maxx kabel eins Schweiz kabel eins Doku kabel eins classics Sat.1 Schweiz; Sat.1 Emotions; Sat.1 Gold sixx Schweiz

History
- Launched: 8 October 2015; 10 years ago

Links
- Website: puls8.ch

Puls 8 is a privately owned TV channel in German-speaking Switzerland, owned by the German media group ProSiebenSat.1 Media. The channel is based on the concept of Puls 4 in Austria, and began broadcasting on 8 October 2015 at 8pm. Its first program was the movie Star Trek.

The 8 in the name of the channel refers to the start of the primetime schedule at 8 pm.

== Programming ==
- Awake (2018)
- Beauty and the Beast (2016–present)
- Eureka (EUReKA - Die geheime Stadt) (2017–present)
- JAG (J.A.G. - Im Auftrag der Ehre) (2016–present)
- Rosewood (2017–present)
- Scream Queens (2017-2018)
- Second Chance (2018)
- The Defenders (2016)
- The Simpsons (Die Simpsons) (2015-2017)
- Touch (2016)
