= ATV2 =

- Country: Austria
- Broadcast area: National

Ownership
- Owner: Tele München Gruppe (2011-2017); ProSiebenSat.1 Media (2017-present)
- Sister channels: ATV; Puls 4 Puls 24; Sat.1 Österreich; ProSieben Austria kabel eins Austria sixx Austria; Sat.1 Gold Österreich; ProSieben Maxx Austria kabel eins Doku Austria

History
- Launched: 1 December 2011 (national terrestrial TV launch); 11 October 2016 (HD feed)
- Closed: 31 December 2023 (SD feed)

Links
- Website: www.atv2.at

Availability

Terrestrial
- SimpliTV: available free-to-air

ATV2 (stylized as ATVII) is an Austrian commercial television station owned by ProSiebenSat.1 Media's local subsidiary ProSiebenSat.1 Media Puls 4. It started broadcasting on 1 December 2011, first on cable and satellite, and later terrestrially as a free-to-view channel. It specializes in entertainment programming, complementing ATV's offer.

Satellite broadcasts are encrypted like the main ATV channel, being receivable with ORF or Sky viewing cards.

== History ==
ATV released details on ATV2 to the press on 12 September 2011. Plans included original programming, movies, TV series and newscasts, a formula similar to the main channel. There were also plans to segment ATV's advertising share with the launch of the new channel, and was finalizing rates to make them attractive. Dubbed anime such as Pokémon and Yu-Gi-Oh were also scheduled to air in the daytime, as well as movies from Herbert Kloiber's back catalog (he was the owner of Tele München Gruppe). The satellite frequency was activated on 3 October 2011, nearly two months ahead of the 1 December launch, on the Astra 1KR satellite. There was still some uncertainty over what would be the channel's potential demographic, or what its line of programming would be; on 25 September, Stadt Bekannt noticed that the announcement was vague and that only the children's programming scheduled for mornings was the sole indication of what it would air.

More details were unveiled in November, with two editions of ATV aktuell (an update at 5:05pm and a longer bulletin at 6:25pm), movies and TV series during primetime Mondays to Thursdays, with blockbusters (one of the first was the German film Die Geschichte vom Brandner Kaspar) on Tuesdays and an assortment of US TV series on Mondays, such as Supernatural, Stargate Atlantis and E-Ring. It was already planning its cultural programming line; and announced the beginning of weekly opera productions to air from 8 April 2012 (Easter Sunday), with productions from the Zurich Opera House and the New York Met Opera. It also announced a spin-off of ATV's Highlights, about news in the Austrian cultural scene.

Broadcasts began on 1 December 2011. Terrestrial broadcasts began on 15 November 2012, but were limited to Vienna, Innsbruck and Bregenz. On 11 October 2016, the channel converted to high definition. Only 1.2 million households could receive it as the feed was limited to cable and satellite television. It continued broadcasting in standard definition on terrestrial television for the time being; its terrestrial penetration at the time was of 86% of Austria.

Following the acquisition of the ATV channels by ProSiebenSat.1 in 2017, the channel was restructured in early 2018, removing reruns of ATV's original programs, and was considering channel-specific original content, such as programs on esports. On 22 November 2022, ATV2 converted to high definition on terrestrial television.
