= Puls 4 =

- Country: Austria

Programming
- Picture format: 576i (SDTV); 720p (HDTV)

Ownership
- Owner: ProSiebenSat.1 Media
- Sister channels: Puls 24; ATV; ATV 2 Sat.1 Österreich; ProSieben Austria kabel eins Austria sixx Austria; Sat.1 Gold Österreich; ProSieben Maxx Austria kabel eins Doku Austria

History
- Launched: 21 June 2004; 22 years ago
- Former names: Puls TV (2004–2008)

Links
- Website: www.puls4.com

Availability

Terrestrial
- DTT (DVB-T): Normally tuned to 4

Puls 4 (Puls vier) is a terrestrial television channel in Austria. As its name implies, it is the fourth Austrian-wide full-service television channel, behind ORF 1, ORF 2, and ATV.

== History ==
Puls 4 began as a local Vienna television station called "Puls TV". In 2007, ProSiebenSat.1 Media took over the station outright. On 28 January 2008, with the addition of a nightly newscast, the station relaunched as "Puls 4", Austria's fourth general terrestrial network.

== Programming ==
=== Original ===
- Austria's Next Topmodel
- Bis in die Spitzen, German version of Cutting It (2010)
- Edel & Starck (2008, 2010)
- The Masked Singer Austria
- Die Kalteneggers (2026)

=== Imported series ===
- 1600 Penn (2017)
- The 4400 (2008, 2010)
- America's Next Top Model
- Bones
- Cagney & Lacey (2010)
- Castle
- Criminal Minds: Suspect Behavior (Criminal Minds: Team Red) (2014-2016)
- CSI: Crime Scene Investigation (2011-2014)
- CSI: Miami (2008–present)
- CSI: NY (2012-2016)
- Dawson's Creek (2009)
- Diagnosis: Murder (Diagnose: Mord) (2008-2016)
- ER
- Family Guy
- Fringe (Fringe - Grenzfälle des FBI) (2010-2012)
- The Guardian (The Guardian - Retter mit Herz) (2008-2010)
- Highway to Heaven (Ein Engel auf Erden) (2008-2016)
- House
- King (2013-2014)
- Law & Order
- Law & Order: SVU
- Magnum, P.I. (Magnum) (2009-2010)
- Miami Vice (2009-2010)
- Murder, She Wrote (Mord ist ihr Hobby) (2009-2017)
- NCIS
- Numb3rs (Numb3rs - Die Logik des Verbrechens) (2008-2013, 2016)
- Royal Pains (2011-2014)
- Sherlock
- The Shield (The Shield - Gesetz der Gewalt) (2008-2010)
- Terra Nova (2012)
- The Wonder Years (Wunderbare Jahre) (2013-2014)

=== Imported Children's series ===
- Chavez Animiert, German dub of El Chavo Animado (2008-2011)

=== Sports ===
- NFL
- UEFA Europa League
- UEFA Conference League
- UEFA Youth League

== Logos ==
Logo of Puls TV

Logo until December 2015

Logo of Puls 4 HD until December 2015

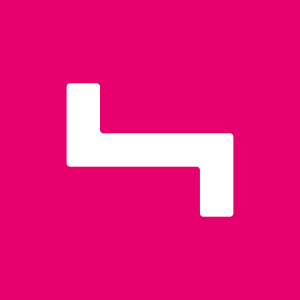
Logo from December 2015 until 4 September 2016

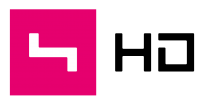
Logo of Puls 4 HD from December 2015 until 4 September 2016

Logo since 5 September 2016

Logo of Puls 4 HD since 5 September 2016

Cornerlogo since 5 September 2016

Cornerlogo of Puls 4 HD since 5 September 2016

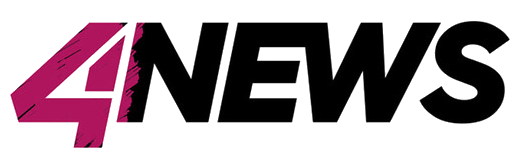
Logo of the daughter channel 4News from on Autumn 2016
