= Marc Bator =

German television moderator

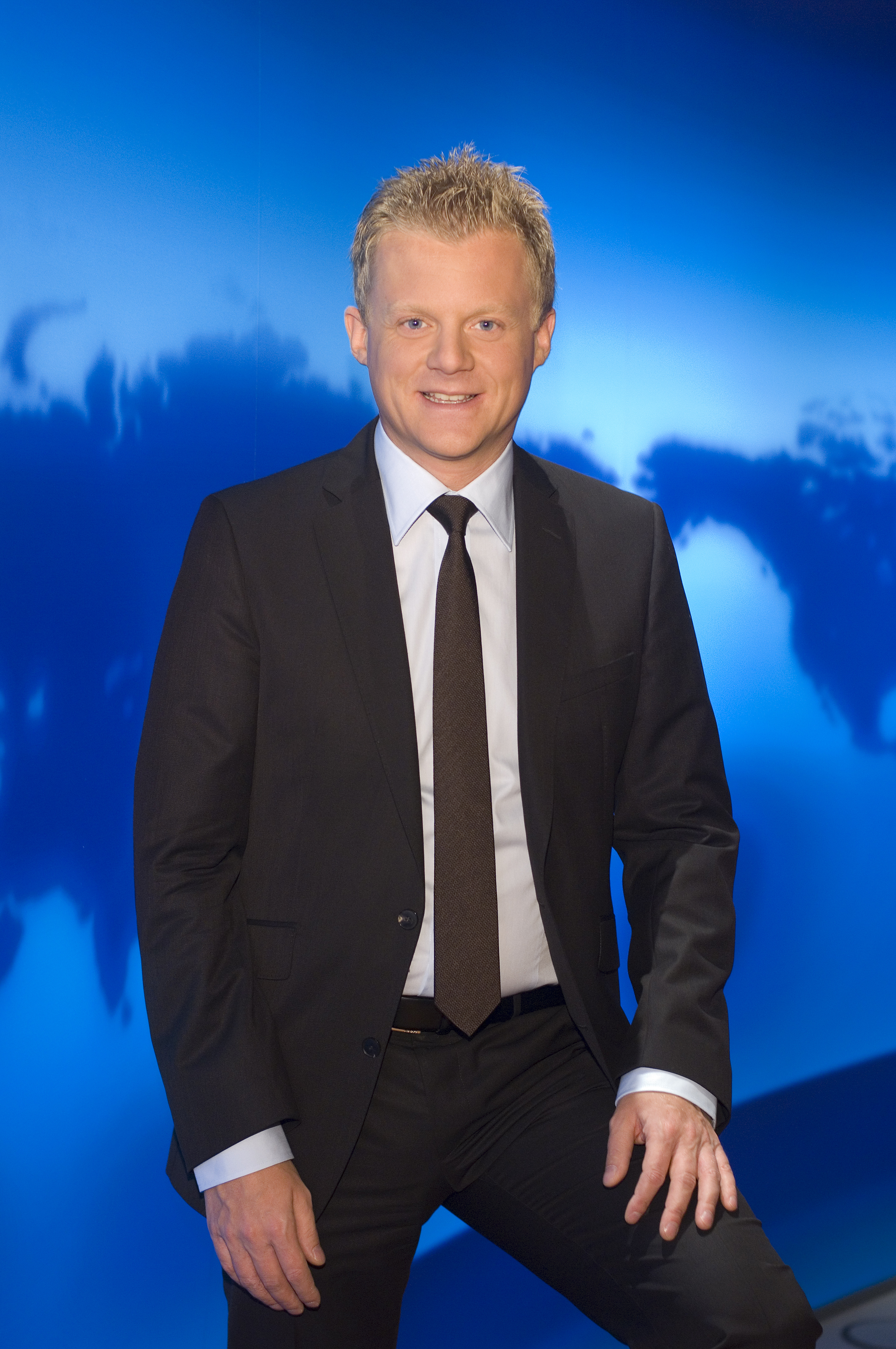
Marc Bator

Marc Bator (born 4 December 1972) is a German journalist and television moderator.

== Life ==
Bator was born in Hannover. From 2001 to 2013 he worked for the German news magazine Tagesschau broadcast by ARD. Since 2013 he worked for Sat.1 Nachrichten (later :newstime) on German broadcaster Sat.1. Bator is married and has two children.
