= Sat.1 Comedy =

- Country: Germany
- Broadcast area: Germany, Austria, Switzerland
- Network: Sat.1
- Headquarters: Unterföhring, Germany

Programming
- Language: German
- Picture format: 576i (16:9 SDTV)

Ownership
- Owner: ProSiebenSat.1 Media
- Sister channels: Sat.1

History
- Launched: 1 June 2006; 19 years ago
- Closed: 3 May 2012; 13 years ago (5 years, 337 days)
- Replaced by: Sat.1 emotions

Links
- Website: www.sat1comedy.de

Sat.1 Comedy was a pay-TV channel of ProSiebenSat.1 Media AG, which broadcast from 1 June 2006 to 3 May 2012. On 3 May 2012 20:15 the program was replaced by Sat.1 emotions, content successor was the same day started channel ProSieben Fun.

The 24-hour program included self-produced and purchased German and English-language comedies series and films.

Sat.1 Comedy was available on Sky Deutschland, Kabel Deutschland, Unitymedia, Primacom and Kabel BW, as well as in the IPTV offers of Telekom Entertain, Vodafone, Alice Home TV, Telefónica Germany (formerly Hansenet) and since mid-2009 also in Switzerland via Cablecom Digital TV.

== Programming ==
- Alles außer Sex (2007-2008, 2010-2011)
- Andy Richter Controls the Universe (Die Welt und Andy Richter) (2006-2007)
- Anything but Love (Alles außer Liebe) (2006-2010)
- Becker (2009-2012)
- Benson (2006)
- Blackadder (2006-2008)
- Danni Lowinski (2010-2012)
- Das Büro (2007-2009)
- Der kleine Mann (2010-2011)
- Der letzte Bulle (2011-2012)
- Designing Women (Sugarbaker's - Mann muss nicht sein) (2006)
- Desperate Housewives (2007-2012)
- Die Dreisten Drei (2006-2012)
- Edel & Starck (2006-2011)
- Family Guy (2007)
- Frasier (2007-2012)
- Frech wie Janine (2006-2008)
- Friends (2008-2009)
- Grounded for Life (Keine Gnade für Dad) (2007-2010)
- headnut.tv (2006-2010)
- Hope & Faith (2006-2007)
- I Dream of Jeannie (Bezaubernde Jeannie) (2010)
- König von Kreuzberg (2006, 2009-2011)
- Ladykracher (2006-2008, 2010-2012)
- Little Britain (2006-2008)
- Malcolm in the Middle (Malcolm mittendrin) (2006-2012)
- Married... with Children (Eine schrecklich nette Familie) (2006)
- Mensch Markus (2006-2012)
- My Two Dads (Ein Vater zuviel) (2006)
- Pastewka (2006-2012)
- Quiz Taxi (2006-2012)
- Robot Chicken (2007-2008)
- Roseanne (2007-2010)
- Sechserpack (2006-2012)
- Seinfeld (2006)
- Sex and the City (2006-2010)
- Spezialeinsatz (2011-2012)
- Stromberg (2006-2012)
- Switch (2006-2007)
- Switch reloaded (2008-2012)
- Tramitz and Friends (2006-2009, 2011-2012)
- The Cosby Show (Die Bill Cosby-Show) (2010-2012)
- The Jeffersons (Die Jeffersons) (2006-2007)
- The Office (2006-2010)
- The Simpsons (Die Simpsons) (2006-2010)
- The Venture Bros. (2008)
- Was nicht passt, wird passend gemacht (2006-2011)
- Weeds (Weeds - Kleine Deals unter Nachbarn) (2009-2012)
- Weibsbilder (2007-2011)
- Will & Grace (2006-2012)
- Who's the Boss? (Wer ist hier der Boss?) (2006)
