= Sat.1 Emotions =

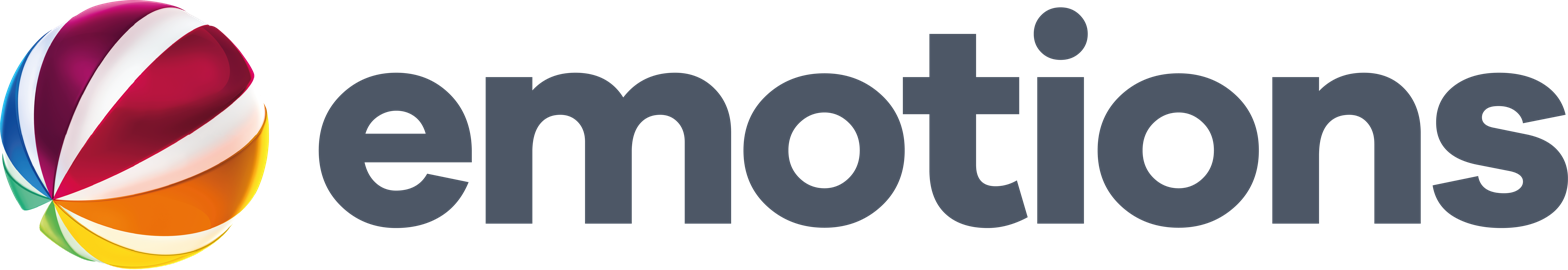
- Country: Germany
- Broadcast area: Germany, Austria
- Network: Sat.1
- Headquarters: Unterföhring, Germany

Programming
- Language(s): German
- Picture format: 576i (16:9 SDTV); 1080i (HDTV)

Ownership
- Owner: ProSiebenSat.1 Media
- Sister channels: Sat.1; Sat.1 Gold; ProSieben; ProSieben Fun; ProSieben Maxx kabel eins kabel eins classics kabel eins Doku sixx

History
- Launched: 3 May 2012; 13 years ago
- Replaced: Sat.1 Comedy

Links
- Website: www.sat1emotions.de

Availability

Streaming media
- Magine TV (Germany) Zattoo: -

Sat.1 emotions is a ProSiebenSat.1 Media pay-TV channel. It started broadcasting on May 3, 2012 at 8:15 pm. It replaced Sat.1 Comedy. ProSiebenSat.1 Media also operates the two pay-TV channels kabel eins classics and ProSieben Fun.

Sat.1 emotions broadcasts 24 hours a day, focussing on German soap operas, series and films. On some days international films and series are shown.

== Distribution ==
Sat.1 emotions is available in Germany and Austria via cable and IPTV, depending on the cable network operator in SD and / or HD.

Until June 30, 2016 Sat.1 emotions was also available on the Sky Deutschland satellite platform.

== Logos ==
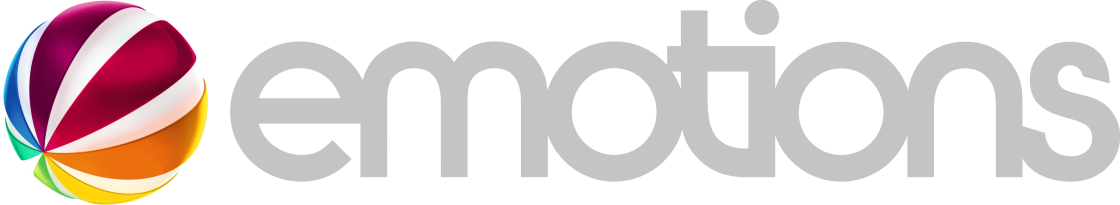
Logo of Sat.1 emotions until March 26, 2019

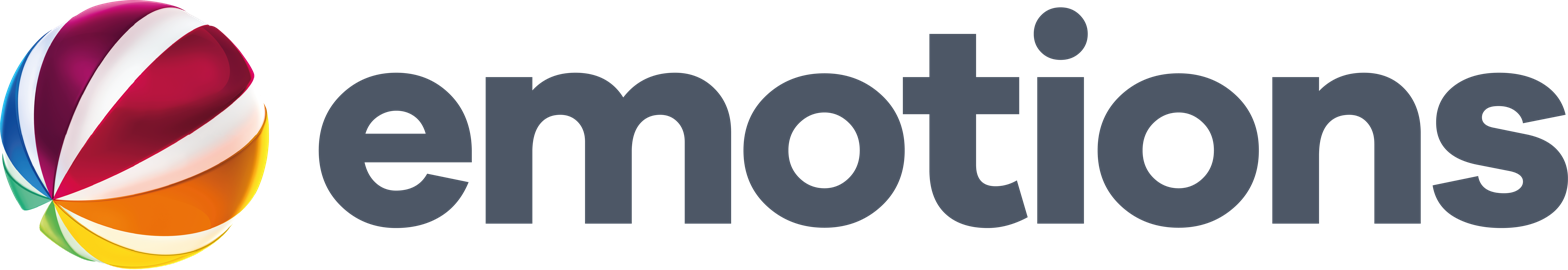
Logo of Sat.1 emotions since March 27, 2019

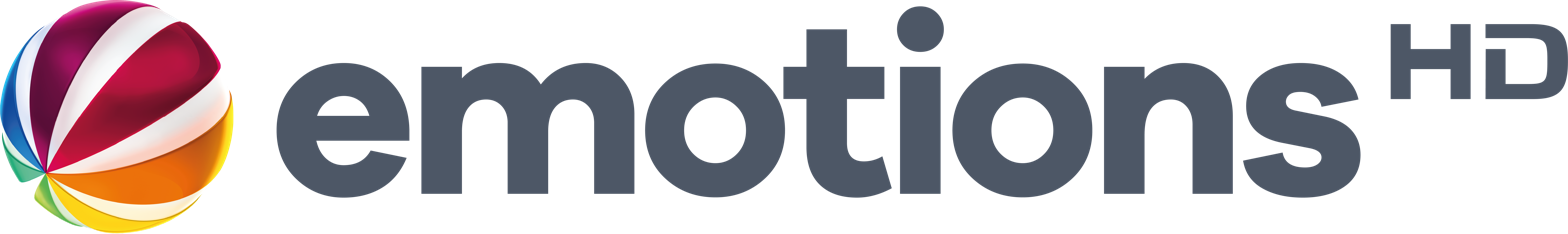
Logo of Sat.1 emotions HD since March 27, 2019

== Programming ==
- Alex (2018–present)
- Alisa – Folge deinem Herzen (2014–present)
- Anna und die Liebe (2012–present)
- Awake (2014, 2018)
- Blindspot (2016–present)
- Code Black (2016–present)
- Commissario Montalbano (2014–present)
- Crossing Lines (2013–present)
- Danni Lowinski (2012–present)
- Dark Blue (2013-2016)
- Der Cop und der Snob (2012-2015, 2017)
- Der letzte Bulle (2012–present)
- Die Straßen von Berlin (2012-2014)
- Dr. Molly & Karl (2012-2014)
- Emily Owens, M.D. (Emily Owens) (2014-2016)
- Extant (2017–present)
- FlashForward (2017)
- Flikken Maastricht (Cops Maastricht) (2017)
- Frequency (2018–present)
- Für alle Fälle Stefanie (2012)
- George Gently (George Gently - Der Unbestechliche) (2017)
- Hand aufs Herz (2012–present)
- Hanna – Folge deinem Herzen (2014–present)
- Homeland (2017–present)
- Inspector Montalbano (Commissario Montalbano/Il Commissario Montalbano) (2014–present)
- Jack Taylor (2015–present)
- Klinik am Alex (2012-2013)
- Knallerfrauen (2012–present)
- Knallerkerle (2017)
- Ladykracher (2012-2015)
- Lotta in Love (2012–present)
- Pastewka (2012-2015)
- Profilage (Profiling Paris) (2015–present)
- Remedy (2015-2016)
- Rush (2017)
- Schmetterlinge im Bauch (2012–present)
- Second Chance (2018)
- Section de recherches (Crime Scene Riviera) (2016–present)
- Stalker (2015)
- Syke (Nurses) (2016–present)
- The Americans (2015–present)
- The Defenders (2018–present)
- The Ellen DeGeneres Show (2013-2014)
- The Five (2017)
- The Late Show with Stephen Colbert (2020–present)
- The Mentalist (2014)
- The Nanny (Die Nanny) (2017–present)
- The Young Montalbano (Der junge Montalbano/Il giovane Montalbano) (2015–present)
- This Is Us (2017–present)
- Tyrant (2016–present)
- Un passo dal cielo (Die Bergpolizei - Ganz nah am Himmel) (2018–present)
- Vår Tid är Nu (The Restaurant) (2018–present)
- Verliebt in Berlin (2012–present)
- Verrückt nach Clara (2012, 2015, 2017)
- Will & Grace (2014–present)
