= ProSieben Fun =

- Country: Germany
- Broadcast area: Germany, Switzerland
- Network: ProSieben
- Headquarters: Unterföhring, Germany

Programming
- Language: German
- Picture format: 576i (16:9 SDTV); 1080i (HDTV)

Ownership
- Owner: ProSiebenSat.1 Media
- Sister channels: ProSieben; ProSieben Maxx kabel eins kabel eins Doku kabel eins classics Sat.1; Sat.1 Emotions; Sat.1 Gold sixx

History
- Launched: 3 May 2012; 14 years ago

Links
- Website: www.prosiebenfun.de

Availability

Streaming media
- Magine TV (Germany): -
- Zattoo (Germany): -

ProSieben Fun is a pay-TV channel from ProSiebenSat.1 Media that was launched on 3 May 2012.

The channel targets 14-39 year olds. ProSieben Fun shows repeats of ProSieben and Sat.1 shows, plus exclusive premieres (including Germany's Next Top Model), movies, series, sport, and music events.

== Distribution ==
The channel is broadcast as a simulcast and can be received via Telekom Entertain, MagentaTV, Vodafone, 1&1 AG, Sunruse and Magine TV among others.

Until 1 July 2016, the channel was also available via Sky Deutschland. On 18 May 2016 ProSiebenSat.1 Media announced that it would cease broadcasting on the Sky platform as of 30 June 2016 due to "different strategic orientations".

The channel was available in Austria until the end of June 2016.

== Programming ==
=== Current ===
- 1600 Penn (2014–present)
- 24: Legacy (2017–present)
- Accidentally on Purpose (Aus Versehen glücklich) (2013–present)
- American Dad! (2021-present)
- American Horror Story (2014–present)
- American Housewife (2017–present)
- Archer (2017–present)
- Baskets (2018–present)
- Beauty & the Beast (2014–present)
- Being Human (2014–present)
- Black Sails (2014–present)
- Cooper Barrett's Guide to Surviving Life (2018–present)
- Crazy Ex-Girlfriend (2016–present)
- Damien (2017–present)
- Deadbeat (2015–present)
- Dimension 404 (2018–present)
- Gang Related (2017–present)
- Germany's Next Topmodel (2012–present)
- Golan the Insatiable (2018–present)
- Gotham (2015–present)
- Hamish and Andy's Gap Year (seasons 2–4) (2015–present)
- Jeff Ross Presents Roast Battle (2018–present)
- Last Man Standing (2015–present)
- Limitless (2016–present)
- Lip Sync Battle (Lip Sync Battle - mit LL Cool J) (2016–present)
- Lucas Bros. Moving Co. (2018–present)
- Plebs (2016–present)
- Quantico (2016–present)
- Saturday Night Live (2012–present)
- Scorpion (2015–present)
- Sleepy Hollow (2018–present)
- Speechless (2017–present)
- Son of Zorn (2018–present)
- Star (2017–present)
- Supergirl (2016–present)
- The Almost Impossible Gameshow (2017–present)
- The Big Bang Theory (2014–present)
- The Exorcist (2017–present)
- The Flash (2015–present)
- The Grinder (2017–present)
- The Inbetweeners (2016–2018)
- The Last Man on Earth (2017–present)
- The Late Late Show with James Corden (2017–present)
- The New Normal (2014–present)
- The Strain (2017–present)
- The Unusuals (2015)
- The Vampire Diaries (Vampire Diaries) (2013–present)
- Touch (2015, 2017–present)
- Vikings (2014–present)

=== Comedy ===
- Chuck (2012-2016)
- Eureka (EUReKA - Die geheime Stadt) (2012–2014, 2016–2017)
- Scream Queens (2017)
- Weeds (Weeds - Kleine Deals unter Nachbarn) (2012-2014)
- You're the Worst (2016-2017)
- The Muppet Show (2012-2013)

=== Sitcoms ===
- It's Always Sunny in Philadelphia (2013-2015)
- Family Guy (2013-2025)
- Bob's Burgers (2017-2026)
- Futurama (2014-2018)

=== Drama ===
- Empire (2015–2017)
- Minority Report (2016-2017)
- Second Chance (2018)
- Terra Nova (2012-2015)
- The Royals (2015-2016)
