= Kabel eins classics =

kabel eins classics
- Country: Germany
- Broadcast area: Germany, Austria, Switzerland
- Network: kabel eins
- Headquarters: Unterföhring, Germany

Programming
- Language: German
- Picture format: 576i (16:9 SDTV); 1080i (HDTV)

Ownership
- Owner: ProSiebenSat.1 Media
- Sister channels: kabel eins kabel eins Doku; SAT.1; SAT.1 Emotions; SAT.1 Gold; ProSieben; ProSieben Fun; ProSieben Maxx sixx

History
- Launched: 1 June 2006; 20 years ago

Links
- Website: www.kabeleinsclassics.de

Availability

Streaming media
- Magine TV (Germany): -

kabel eins classics is a German pay-tv channel owned by ProSiebenSat.1 Media. A sister channel of kabel eins it first went on air on 1 June 2006. It broadcasts 24 hours a day, mainly films and series from the 1940s to the late 1990s. On Saturdays, films from the 2000s are shown.

== Programming ==
Kabel eins classics shows films, series and exclusive in-house productions. Broadcasts include Star Trek, The Andromeda Strain, A Foreign Affair and Clear and Present Danger. In addition, series such as The Streets of San Francisco, Vega$, The A-Team and Miami Vice.

== Broadcasting ==
An HD version of the channel is broadcast via Telekom Entertain, Unitymedia and Kabel Deutschland.

On 18 May 2016, ProSiebenSat.1 Media announced its intention to discontinue the distribution via the Sky platform on 30 June 2016, citing "different strategic orientations". It had therefore been decided to terminate broadcasting at the end of the agreed contract term.

== Programming ==
- Booker (2008, 2010)
- Joe Dancer (2010–present)
- Married... with Children (Eine schrecklich nette Familie) (2013-2017)
- T. J. Hooker (2017–present)
