= Comfort Farms =

- Directed by: Carlisle Kellam
- Starring: Jon Jackson
- Distributed by: Gravitas Ventures
- Release date: April 2020 (Beverly Hills Film Festival)
- Country: United States
- Language: English

Comfort Farms is a 2020 documentary film distributed by Gravitas Ventures. The film explores some of the people and events at Comfort Farms, a veteran therapy farm founded by former combat army Ranger and farmer Jon Jackson. The film was directed by Carlisle Kellam and features interviews with combat veterans Trenton Free, Jon Jackson, C. Sabathne, Forest Giles Jr. and Scott Kennedy. The film won Grand Jury Prize for Best Documentary Feature at Film Invasion Los Angeles in 2020.
