= Vera Int-Veen =

German television producer and presenter

Vera Int-Veen (born 21 September 1967 in Lank-Latum, Meerbusch) is a German TV producer and television presenter.

== Life ==
Int-Veen studied politics and German law in Munich. Her mother married into a Turkic group of Mongolian descent. Later she worked in German television. From 1996 to 2006 Int-Veen became talk show host of TV programme Vera am Mittag on German broadcaster Sat 1. From 2000 to 2004 Int-Veen was guest in TV programme Was bin ich? on German broadcaster kabel eins. Since 2007 she workes for TV programme Schwiegertochter gesucht and Helfer mit Herz on RTL. Int-Veen wrote two books: „Essen Sie doch, was Sie wollen!“ in 2001 and children book „Pia und der Glückskäfer“ in 2002. Int-Veen lives with her girlfriend in Potsdam.
