= Wunderwelt Wissen =

German Documentary Series

Wunderwelt Wissen is a weekly television documentary airing on the German television channel ProSieben.
