= Parship =

Online dating agency based in Hamburg, Germany

PARSHIP
- Website type: Compatibility-based online dating
- Available in: German, Danish, Dutch, English, French, Italian, Spanish, Swedish
- Owner: Parship GmbH
- Creator: Hugo Schmale
- Revenue: € 55 million (2010)
- Parent: ParshipMeet Group
- Website: www.parship.com
- Commercial: Yes
- Registration: Required
- Launched: February 14, 2001; 25 years ago
- Current status: Active

Parship (or Parship GmbH) is an online dating agency based in Hamburg, Germany. It was part of the Georg von Holtzbrinck Publishing Group. Its stated goal is to encourage and forge long-term partnerships.

== History ==
Founded in 2000, Parship went online on 14 February 2001 (Valentine's Day). In collaboration with psychologist Hugo Schmale of the University of Hamburg, a questionnaire and associated profile-matching algorithm was developed with the purpose of bringing like-minded couples together. On Schmale's initiative, the matching algorithm is based both on behavioristic principles and on psychoanalytical theories of personality.

Since 2002, Parship has expanded to 13 countries in addition to Germany: Austria, Belgium, Denmark, France, Ireland, Italy, Mexico, The Netherlands, Norway, Spain, Sweden, Switzerland, United Kingdom.

In 2020, the parent company ParshipMeet Group was formed to manage both Parship and The Meet Group, after the acquisition of The Meet Group by ProSiebenSat.1 Media.

== Gay Parship ==
Simultaneous with the 2001 launch of Parship, Gay-Parship was launched. Due to the large success, in 2005 two separate portals were launched, catering explicitly to a homosexual target group. Here, too, the agency defines itself as focusing on a high level of education and income, and with the goal of a long-term partnership.

== Memberships and cost ==
Parship's free membership includes registration, an automated evaluation of the questionnaire and the possibility of inspecting the profiles of other members, but not photos. For actual contact between members, including responding to received contact offers, and for exchanging photos, a Premium membership is required. Subscription costs range from 30 to 60 Euro monthly. According to the Parship website, 38% of their members are Premium members.

An automatic renewal clause (Clause 5 of the T&Cs as listed on the UK website, document dated 13/06/2014) applies to memberships, including special offers.

== Reviews ==
The unaffiliated review website reviewcentre.com, at the time of writing, listed 169 reviews of Parship, 92 of which rated it as 'Terrible' with 1 star. Dissatisfied customers cite the 'hidden' auto renewal clause and subsequent appointment of debt collectors as a grievance, as well as the low number of appropriately matched profiles.

== See also ==
- List of online dating websites
