= Women's interest channel =

Type of television channel catering to women

A women's interest channel generally refers to either a television station, network or specialty channel that targets women as its main demographic; offering programs that will appeal to the female population.

There are two types of female interest channels: general interest and niche interest. General interest women's channels are television channels that contain programming from diverse genres and categories that will appeal to the female population including films, lifestyle series, dramatic series, reality series, comedy series, and talk shows on varying topics including cooking, travel, cars, sexism, and sports. Niche interest women's channels are television channels that contain programming with a specific television genre such as film channels, and lifestyle channels.

An example is sixx, a German free-to-air television channel which targets a female audience.
