= What Went Down (TV series) =

- Created by: Bellum Entertainment Group
- Written by: Amanda Deibert; Mitch Hansen; David Blatter; Mike Leonardo; Leeman Parker
- Narrated by: Pete Sepenuk
- Theme music composer: Alexander Andresen
- Country of origin: United States
- Original language: English
- No. of seasons: 3
- No. of episodes: 156

Production
- Executive producers: Mary Carole McDonnell; Peter McDonnel; Mike Leonardo
- Producer: Mike Rosemeyer
- Editors: Jaylan Aburto; Kyle Culver; Charles Newberry; Jonathon Courtot; Evon Barros
- Running time: 30 minutes

Original release
- Network: The CW; Syndication
- Release: September 8, 2014

What Went Down is a 2014 comedy montage series that features collections of sports mistakes, epic fails and embarrassing outcomes. The series began on September 8, 2014, on The CW and in the US broadcast syndication. What Went Down is created and produced by the Bellum Entertainment Group and is distributed internationally by the Sky Vision. The third season of What Went Down began on September 10, 2016.

== Segments ==
What Went Down has used many segment names for many episodes. The most common segments include:

What's About to Go Down
Never Have I Ever
Devin Supertramp Moment
Would You Rather?

== International distribution ==
What Went Down is distributed to international markets by Sky Vision. The series has been sold to 124 territories including Seven Network in Australia, Blue Ant Media in Canada, BBC Worldwide in Poland, Discovery Focus in Italy, Globosat in Brazil and ProSieben Maxx in Germany.
