= Klinik am Alex =

- Country of origin: Germany

Klinik am Alex (English: Clinic at Alex) is a German television series.

Klinik am Alex was the title of a television series by Sat.1. The series dealt with the medical staff of a clinic on Berlin's Alexanderplatz . The series was produced by teamWorx in the former building of the Heckeshorn lung clinic in Berlin-Wannsee. The international trade center (IHZ) on Friedrichstrasse served as the facade of the clinic.

Since the ratings were below the channel average of Sat.1, the program with episode five was discontinued on February 26, 2009. The series returned on March 10, 2012 beginning with episode one in the program of Sat.1. However, the series only reached 1.11 million viewers, which corresponded to a market share of 4.4%. From the sixth episode, the episodes were broadcast on Sundays at 7:00 a.m. as the first German broadcast. From the twelfth episode, the remaining episodes were broadcast on the pay TV channel Sat.1 emotions.

== See also ==
- List of German television series
