= Newstime =

- Also known as: :newstime
- Genre: News program
- Presented by: Karolin Kandler; Claudia von Brauchitsch; Marc Bator; Norbert Anwander; Angela van Brakel; Stephanie Puls; Jule Gölsdorf; Kira Alin; Ina Dietz; Philipp Isterewicz; Delia Träger
- Country of origin: Germany
- Original language: German

Production
- Running time: 10-15 minutes
- Production companies: ProSiebenSat.1 Media; Maz & More TV Produktion (early edition only)

Original release
- Network: ProSieben; Sat.1; Kabel eins
- Release: 1 January 1989 – present

Newstime (stylized as :newstime) is a German television news program on ProSieben, Sat.1 & Kabel Eins that is presented by journalists Karolin Kandler. The first broadcast took place on 1 January 1989 around the same time that ProSieben itself started broadcasting. On 19 June 2023, the program started broadcasting on Sat.1 and Kabel Eins when their respective news programs, Sat.1 Nachrichten and Kabel Eins News merged their operations into the Newstime program, therefore uniting their news operations under one program under the Newstime name.

:newstime airs live at 15:50, 18:00 and 19:55 CET, and includes news, with an emphasis on political news from Germany, Europe and the world, plus 'mixed' news from entertainment.

The main program usually has a length of 10 minutes (including a weather forecast). A breakfast news bulletin from monday to friday for segment program with Sat.1-Frühstücksfernsehen and around 01:00 and 04:00 CET, a shorter show called :newstime Spätnachrichten (newstime late news) is broadcast.

== Trivia ==
- The ProSieben TV channel and its show Newstime were briefly shown twice in Captain America: Civil War. The first time was in a hotel room in Berlin while Helmut Zemo was studying a Soviet diary on The Winter Soldier. Michael Marx and Laura Dünnwald starred as themselves.
