= Sat.1 =

German TV station

- Country: Germany
- Broadcast area: Europe
- Headquarters: Unterföhring, Germany

Programming
- Language: German
- Picture format: 1080i HDTV (downscaled to 16:9 576i for the SDTV feed)
- Timeshift service: +1

Ownership
- Owner: ProSiebenSat.1 Media
- Sister channels: ProSieben; Kabel eins Sixx; Sat.1 Emotions; Sat.1 Gold; ProSieben Fun; ProSieben Maxx kabel eins classics kabel eins Doku

History
- Launched: 1 January 1984; 42 years ago
- Former names: PKS (1984)

Links
- Website: sat1.de

Availability

Terrestrial
- Digital terrestrial television: Varies within location

Streaming media
- Ziggo GO (Netherlands): ZiggoGO.tv (Europe only)
- Joyn (Germany): joyn.de (Germany only)
- Sat.1 Livestream: Watch Live

Sat.1 (German pronunciation: [zatˈˀaɪ̯ns]) is a German free-to-air television channel that is a part of the ProSiebenSat.1 Media Group.

Sat.1 was first launched in January 1984 and was initially named PKS (Programmgesellschaft für Kabel- und Satellitenrund). The network is considered to be the first privately owned television network in Germany, initially a joint venture of various publishing houses, and was rebranded into its current name in January 1985. The first broadcast could only be seen by roughly 1200 households who had cable access in the city of Ludwigshafen. Early programs included old films (mainly from the archives of KirchMedia) American hit series and game shows (the most notable show being the German version of Wheel of Fortune, Glücksrad). Later, the station acquired a name for its original series and TV films. By 1988, it was the most watched tv channel in West Germany.

Pay-TV sister channel Sat.1 Emotions (formerly Sat.1 Comedy) airs comedy, romance and movies. In 2013 Sat.1 Gold, a second, free-to-air Sat.1 offshoot was also launched.

In addition to its free-to-air standard definition feed, Sat.1 also broadcasts an HD feed as a subscription-only channel, available on Astra's HD+ satellite pay-TV platform.

== History ==
The channel was created following the election of Helmut Kohl who announced the creation of the first cable pilot projects, the first of which began on 1 January 1984 in Ludwigshafen. The channel launched on that day as PKS, one day before the launch of competitor RTL. The channel wasn't successful, as only 2,600 households received it (even though it enabled nationwide coverage using a weak satellite), and RTLplus, which initially broadcast from Luxembourg, upon obtaining a VHF frequency (channel 7) unused from West Germany, gained a foothold. Leo Kirch was PKS's largest shareholder, though he had indirect control. Early evening programming included non-commercial and sophisticated current affairs programmes and news magazines, which were seen as boring for the average viewer.

The first face seen on PKS was that of Jürgen Doetz.

== Sat.1 Regional ==
Regional newscasts are broadcast under the title 17:30 Sat.1... in Bremen, Lower Saxony, Hamburg, Schleswig-Holstein, North Rhine-Westphalia, Rhineland-Palatinate, Hesse and Bavaria.

- 17:30 Sat.1 live (Rhineland-Palatinate and Hesse)
- 17:30 Sat.1 NRW (North Rhine-Westphalia)
- 17:30 Sat.1 Regional (Hamburg and Schleswig-Holstein)
- 17:30 Sat.1 Regional (Lower Saxony and Bremen)
- 17:30 Sat.1 Bayern (Bavaria).

== Programmes ==
=== Soap opera ===
Current:

- Die Landarztpraxis (2023–present)

=== Soap opera ===
Former:

- Das Küstenrevier (2024)

=== Children ===
- The Bugs Bunny Show (2000–2008?)

=== Entertainment ===
- 5 mal 5, German version of Lingo hosted by Bernd Schumacher (1993–1994)
- Aus den Augen verloren, hosted by Jörg Wontorra (1995–1996)
- Bingo, hosted by Wolf-Dieter Herrmann (1991–1992)
- Bitte melde dich!, hosted by Jörg Wontorra (1992–1998)
- Die Comedy-Falle, hosted by Kai Pflaume (2005–2011)
- Die Harald Schmidt Show, late-night show hosted by Harald Schmidt (1995–2004, 2011–2012)
- Die Hella von Sinnen Show, hosted by Hella von Sinnen (2006)
- Die Hit-Giganten, hosted by Hugo Egon Balder (2003–2012)
- Die MyVideo-Show, hosted by Annika Lau (2006–2007)
- Erben gesucht, hosted by Jörg Wontorra (1994)
- Geh aufs Ganze!, hosted by Jörg Draeger (1992–1997)
- Genial daneben, hosted by Hugo Egon Balder (2003–2011, 2017–2021)
- Glücksrad, German version of Wheel of Fortune (1988–1997)
- Got to Dance, hosted by Alexandra Maurer (2013–2014)
- Got to Dance Kids, hosted by Alexandra Maurer (2015)
- Jeder gegen Jeden, German version of Fifteen to One hosted by Hans-Hermann Gockel (1996–2001)
- Jetzt reicht's!, hosted by Vera Int-Veen (1997–1998)
- Kampf der Köche – Wer haut den Profi in die Pfanne? (2016)
- Kämpf um deine Frau!, hosted by Andrea Kiewel (2004)
- Krypton Faktor, German version of The Krypton Factor hosted by Jörg Draeger (1991)
- Man O Man, hosted by Peer Augustinski (1992–1995)
- Newtopia – Vollkommenes Glück oder totales Chaos?, German version of Utopia (2015)
- Nur die Liebe zählt, hosted by Kai Pflaume (1995–2011)
- Nur die Liebe zählt, hosted by Wayne Carpendale (2014–2015)
- Promi ärgere dich nicht!, hosted by Hugo Egon Balder and Hella von Sinnen (2005–2008)
- Rich List – Jede Antwort zählt, hosted by Kai Pflaume (2007–2008)
- Star Search, hosted by Kai Pflaume (2003–2004)
- Promis unter Palmen (2020–2021)
- The Voice of Germany (2011–present)
- You deserve it (2011-?)
- The Taste, German version of The Taste hosted by Christine Henning (2013–present)
- The Voice Kids (2013–present)
- Promi Big Brother (2013–present)
- The Winner Is ... (2012)
- The Voice Senior (2018–present)
- Big Brother (2020)

=== Information ===
- Akte (1995–present)
- Blitz (1997–2007)
- Blitz am Sonntag (2004–2005)
- Blitzlicht (1998–1999)
- Fahndung Deutschland (2016)
- Focus TV (2010–present)
- :newstime (2023–present)
- push – das Sat.1-Magazin (2012)
- Sat.1 am Mittag (2006–2007)
- Sat.1 Nachrichten (1985–2023)
- Sat.1 – Das Magazin (2007–2012)
- Sat.1-Frühstücksfernsehen (1987–present)
- Schlag 6 (2001–2002)
- Telebörse (1987–1992)
- Unser Tag (2015)
- Weck Up (1998–2014)

=== Scripted reality ===
- 112 – Rettung in letzter Minute (2018–present)
- Anwälte im Einsatz (2013–present)
- Auf Streife (2013–present)
- Auf Streife – Berlin (2016–present)
- Auf Streife – Die Spezialisten (2015–present)
- Die 2 – Anwälte mit Herz (2011)
- Die Ruhrpottwache (2016–present)
- Dringend Tatverdächtig – Duisburg Crime Stories (2018–present)
- Einsatz in Köln – Die Kommissare (2016)
- Familien-Fälle (2012–2014)
- Helft mir! Letzter Ausweg Jugendamt (2013)
- Im Namen der Gerechtigkeit – Wir kämpfen für Sie! (2013–present)
- In Gefahr – Ein verhängnisvoller Moment (2014–2016)
- Inspektion 5 – Köln Mülheim (2018–present)
- K11 – Kommissare im Einsatz (2003–present)
- Klinik am Südring (2016–present)
- Klinik am Südring – Die Familienhelfer (2018–present)
- Lenßen & Partner (2003–2012)
- Mein dunkles Geheimnis (2013–2016)
- Nachbar gegen Nachbar (2012)
- Niedrig und Kuhnt – Kommissare ermitteln (2003–2013)
- Patchwork Family (2013)
- Pures Leben – Mitten in Deutschland (2009–2013)
- Schicksale – und plötzlich ist alles anders (2010–present)
- Zwei bei Kallwass, hosted by Angelika Kallwass (2001–2013)

=== Series ===
- A.S. - Gefahr ist sein Geschäft (1995–1998, 2002, 2007)
- Allein unter Bauern (2007)
- Almost Human (2014)
- Alphateam – Die Lebensretter im OP (1997–2010)
- Anna Maria – Eine Frau geht ihren Weg (1994–1997, 1999, 2003–2004)
- Anna und die Liebe (2008–2011)
- Bis in die Spitzen, German version of Cutting It (2005–2007)
- Booker (1990–1992)
- Broti & Pacek – Irgendwas ist immer (2002–2005, 2007–2008)
- Bull (2017–present)
- Cagney & Lacey (1987–1997)
- Cougar Town (2010-201?)
- Criminal Minds: Suspect Behavior (Criminal Minds: Team Red) (2011, 2013–2014, 2016, 2018–present)
- Crossing Lines (2013–2015)
- Dawson's Creek (1999–2001, 2005, 2007)
- Deception (2018)
- Der Bergdoktor (1992–1998)
- Der Bulle von Tölz (1996–2009)
- Der letzte Bulle (2010–2014)
- Danni Lowinski (2010–2014)
- Edel & Starck (2002–2008, 2011–2012)
- Ein Bayer auf Rügen (1993–1999, 2012)
- Ein Mord für Quandt (1997–1999, 2001–2003)
- Eine wie keine (2009–2010)
- Einstein (2017)
- Eva Blond (2002–2007)
- Falcon Crest (1992–1995)
- Frasier (1997–2004)
- Friends (1996–1998)
- Für alle Fälle Stefanie (1995–2010)
- Geliebte Schwestern (1997–1999)
- General Hospital (1988–1991)
- GSG 9 – Ihr Einsatz ist ihr Leben (2007–2008, 2012)
- Hallo, Onkel Doc! (1994–2010)
- Hand aufs Herz (2010–2011)
- Hawaii Five-0 (2011–present)
- HeliCops – Einsatz über Berlin (1998–2005)
- Homeland (2013–2014, 2016)
- Hotel (1987–1992)
- House of Cards (2013)
- Im Visier der Zielfahnder (2002–2005)
- Instinct (2018)
- Josephine Klick – Allein unter Cops (2014–2015)
- Klinik am Alex (2009, 2012)
- Lethal Weapon (2017)
- Loving (Wege der Liebe) (1994–1995)
- MacGyver (2017–present)
- Mila (2015)
- NCIS (200?-201?)
- NCIS: Los Angeles (2010-201?)
- Numb3rs (Numb3rs – Die Logik des Verbrechens) (2007–2009)
- Plötzlich Papa – Einspruch abgelehnt! (2008)
- Profiling Paris (2015–present)
- Public Morals (1999–2000)
- R. I. S. – Die Sprache der Toten (2007–2008)
- Rush Hour (2017–present)
- Schmetterlinge im Bauch (2006–2009)
- Schwarz greift ein (1994–1999, 2004–2005)
- Scorpion (2015–present)
- SEAL Team (2018)
- SK Kölsch (2001–2007)
- Stadt, Land, Mord! (2006–2010)
- Stalker (2015)
- Sylvia – Eine Klasse für sich (1998–2001, 2004–2005)
- T. J. Hooker (1987–1991)
- That's Life (2004–2010)
- The Ellen Show (2007, 2011)
- The Guardian (The Guardian – Retter mit Herz) (2004, 2006–2009, 2014)
- The Love Boat (Love Boat) (1985–1991, 1994–1996)
- The Mentalist (2009-201?)
- The Smurfs (2000)
- The Unit – Eine Frage der Ehre (2007)
- The Young and the Restless (Schatten der Leidenschaft) (1993–1994)
- Typisch Sophie (2004–2006)
- V (V – Die außerirdischen Besucher kommen) (1988–1990)
- Verliebt in Berlin (2005–2006)
- Welcome Back, Kotter (1985)
- Wolffs Revier (1992–2006)
- Ugly Betty (2007, 2010)
- Zorro (Zorro – Der schwarze Rächer) (1992–1995)

=== Sport ===
- FuXX (1995–1999)
- Jump ran, hosted by Lou Richter (1994–1995)
- ran fun, hosted by Reinhold Beckmann (1995–1999)
- ran Fußball (1992–present)
- ran Boxen (1998–present)
- ranissimo – Sat.1 Fußball-Show (1992–1999)
- Deutsche Tourenwagen Masters (2019–present)
- UEFA Champions League (2027-2031)

=== Talk ===
- Einspruch!, hosted by Ulrich Meyer (1992–1994)
- Kerner, hosted by Johannes B. Kerner (1996–1998)
- Schreinemakers Live, hosted by Margarethe Schreinemakers (1992–1996)
- Sonja, hosted by Sonja Zietlow (1997–2001)
- Talk im Turm, hosted by Stefan Aust and Erich Böhme (1990–1999)
- Vera am Mittag, hosted by Vera Int-Veen (1996–2008)

== Logos ==
1 January 1985 until 1986

1986 until 1996

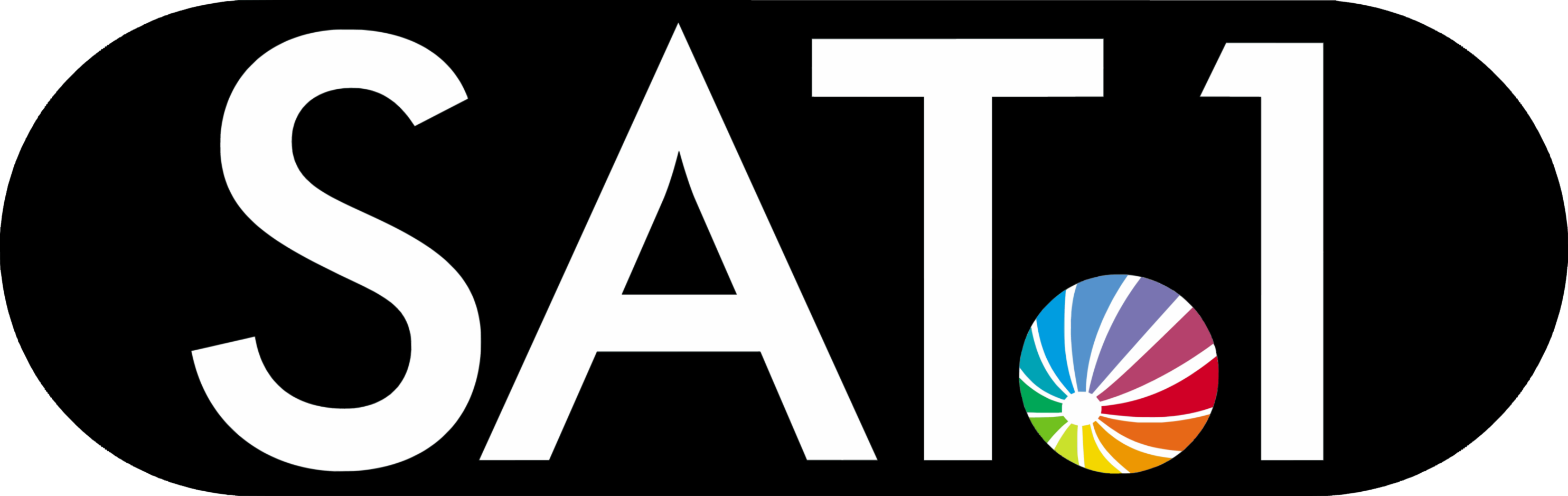
1996 until 31 August 2001

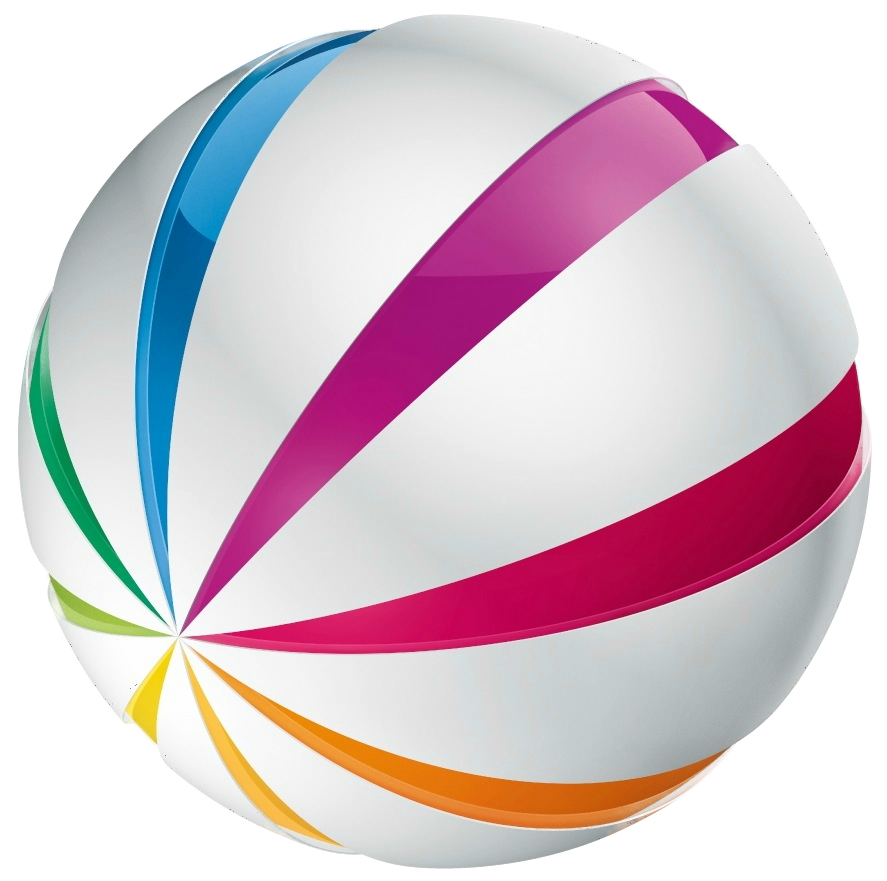
16 August 2011 until 11 October 2016

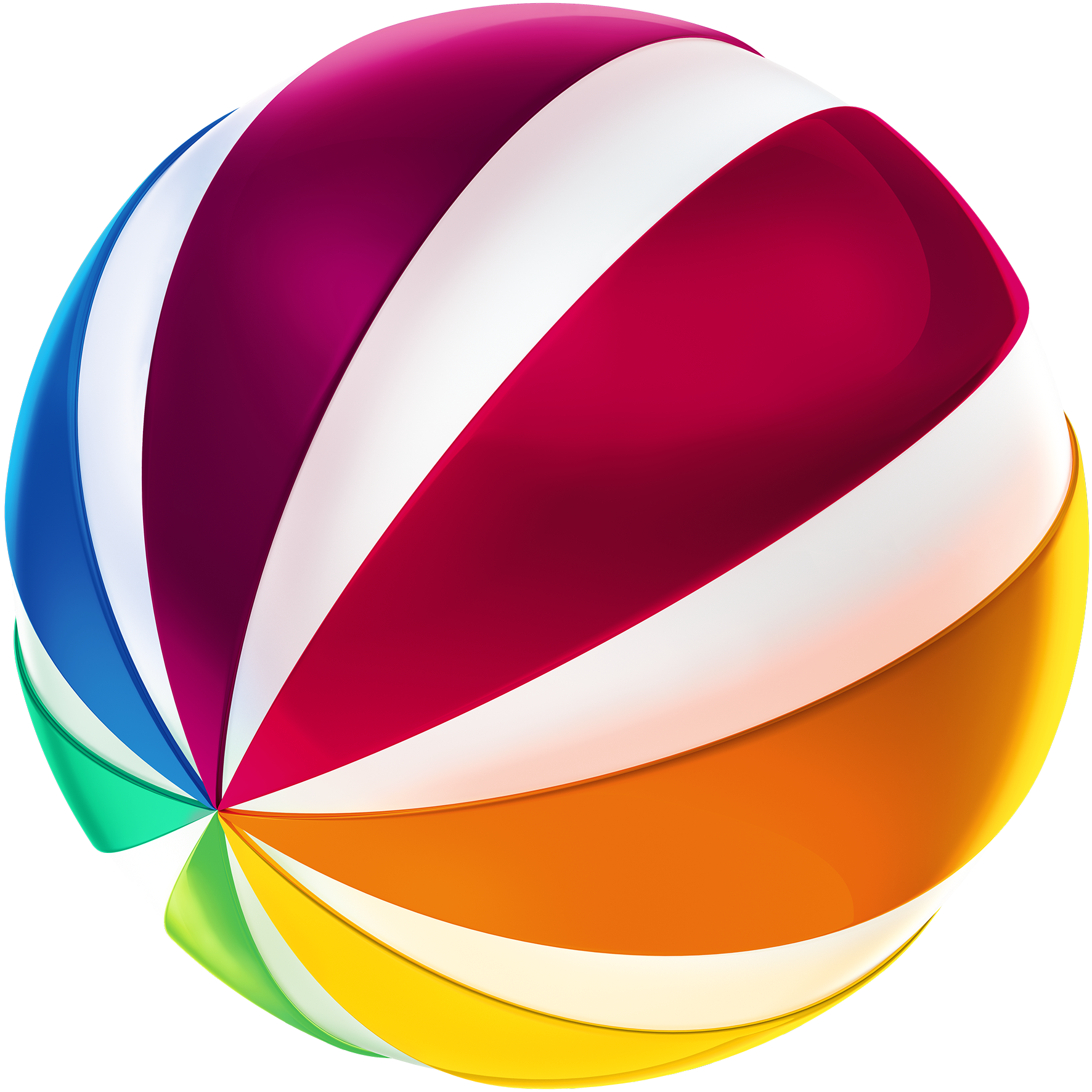
Since 12 October 2016

== Audience share ==
=== Germany ===
	January	February	March	April	May	June	July	August	September	October	November	December	Annual average
1990	-	-	-	-	-	-	-	-	-	-	-	-	9.0%
1991	-	-	-	-	-	-	-	-	-	-	-	-	▲10.6%
1992	-	-	-	-	-	-	-	-	-	-	-	-	▲13.1%
1993	-	-	-	-	-	-	-	-	-	-	-	-	▲14.4%
1994	-	-	-	-	-	-	-	-	-	-	-	-	▼14.9%
1995	-	-	-	-	-	-	-	-	-	-	-	-	▼14.7%
1996	13.1%	13.7%	13.9%	14.3%	14.2%	11.2%	11.6%	13.3%	13.3%	13.8%	13.0%	13.0%	▼13.2%
1997	11.9%	12.3%	14.6%	14.1%	14.4%	13.0%	12.0%	12.7%	12.2%	12.4%	12.8%	12.0%	▼12.8%
1998	13.0%	12.3%	13.6%	13.2%	11.6%	9.0%	9.8%	10.9%	11.7%	12.1%	11.9%	11.4%	▼11.8%
1999	11.0%	10.7%	11.2%	12.1%	12.2%	10.3%	10.2%	10.3%	10.4%	10.3%	10.4%	10.2%	▼10.8%
2000	9.5%	10.2%	10.3%	11.2%	10.2%	9.1%	9.5%	10.2%	10.3%	10.8%	10.8%	10.2%	▼10.2%
2001	10.7%	10.2%	10.4%	10.7%	10.5%	10.0%	9.6%	9.9%	9.3%	9.6%	10.3%	9.6%	▼10.1%
2002	9.7%	9.9%	10.5%	10.3%	10.0%	9.1%	9.7%	9.9%	9.9%	9.9%	10.3%	9.1%	▼9.9%
2003	9.6%	10.0%	9.9%	10.3%	10.1%	9.5%	10.2%	10.3%	10.1%	10.8%	11.1%	9.9%	▲10.2%
2004	10.3%	10.9%	11.2%	9.8%	9.6%	9.6%	9.9%	9.4%	10.8%	10.6%	10.9%	10.1%	▲10.3%
2005	10.4%	10.3%	10.6%	11.1%	11.2%	11.3%	10.5%	11.0%	11.1%	11.3%	11.6%	10.3%	▲10.9%
2006	10.7%	10.0%	10.6%	10.3%	10.4%	8.2%	9.6%	10.2%	9.8%	9.3%	9.2%	9.0%	▼9.8%
2007	9.3%	9.7%	9.9%	9.4%	9.5%	9.4%	9.6%	9.7%	9.7%	9.9%	10.0%	9.4%	▼9.6%
2008	9.8%	10.2%	10.3%	11.5%	10.8%	9.2%	10.7%	10.2%	10.7%	10.5%	10.3%	9.7%	▲10.3%
2009	9.6%	9.9%	10.3%	10.7%	10.9%	10.4%	10.7%	10.5%	11.1%	10.9%	10.4%	9.5%	▲10.4%
2010	9.5%	9.9%	10.9%	11.0%	10.1%	9.1%	10.0%	10.3%	10.6%	10.2%	10.5%	9.6%	▼10.1%
2011	9.6%	9.9%	10.0%	10.4%	10.3%	10.0%	9.9%	10.8%	10.8%	9.9%	10.6%	9.7%	10.1%
2012	9.4%	10.1%	10.1%	10.5%	10.5%	8.9%	9.1%	9.1%	9.4%	9.1%	9.0%	8.0%	▼9.4%
2013	8.2%	7.8%	8.3%	8.8%	8.3%	8.0%	8.1%	8.3%	8.6%	8.4%	8.3%	7.8%	▼8.2%
2014	7.8%	7.8%	8.6%	8.1%	8.1%	7.2%	7.7%	8.7%	8.6%	8.5%	8.3%	8.0%	▼8.1%
2015	7.6%	7.9%	8.3%	7.9%	7.7%	8.0%	8.2%	8.4%	8.1%	8.2%	7.9%	7.1%	▼7.9%
2016	7.0%	7.5%	7.4%	7.4%	7.4%	6.6%	7.1%	7.0%	7.8%	7.4%	7.5%	7.1%	▼7.3%
2017	6.6%	7.1%	7.0%	6.8%	6.8%	6.6%	6.4%	6.8%	6.4%	6.8%	6.6%	6.3%	▼6.7%
2018	5.8%	5.7%	6.4%	6.4%	6.6%	6.1%	6.4%						

View source data.

The average age of the viewers is 50.4 years (as of 2016).
