= ProSieben =

German television network

- Logo used since 24 October 1994
- Country: Germany
- Headquarters: Unterföhring, Germany

Programming
- Language: German
- Picture format: 1080i HDTV (downscaled to 16:9 576i for the SDTV feed)

Ownership
- Owner: ProSiebenSat.1 Media
- Sister channels: ProSieben Fun; ProSieben Maxx kabel eins kabel eins Doku kabel eins classics Sat.1; Sat.1 Emotions; Sat.1 Gold sixx

History
- Launched: 1 January 1989; 37 years ago

Links
- Website: www.prosieben.de

Availability

Terrestrial
- Digital terrestrial television: Various; region dependent (HD)

Streaming media
- ProSieben Livestream: Watch Live

ProSieben (German pronunciation: [pʁoːˈziːbən], sieben is German for "seven"; often stylized as Pro7) is a German free-to-air television network owned by ProSiebenSat.1 Media.

It was launched on 1 January 1989. It is Germany's second-largest privately owned television company. Although ProSieben produces some of its programming itself, it also airs many American imports. On 3 May 2012, the network launched a pay-TV channel called ProSieben Fun. A third channel called ProSieben Maxx started broadcasting on 3 September 2013.

The three different feeds of the channel are: ProSieben (for Germany), ProSieben Austria (for Austria), and ProSieben Schweiz (for Switzerland and Liechtenstein). The main difference is that they have different advertisements and news for each target country.

The channel uses an English slogan: "We love to entertain you."

ProSieben broadcasts from the Astra 1P and 1N satellites and is uplinked by MX1 (now part of SES Video).

== History ==
=== 1988–1993 ===
On 13 October 1988, ProSieben Television GmbH was founded as a successor to Eureka TV. The founding partners were Gerhard Ackermans (51%) and Thomas Kirch (49%). Shortly after, Kirch took complete control of the channel.

On 1 January 1989, ProSieben began broadcasting nine hours of programming a day from Munich. The CEO was Georg Kofler from South Tyrol. ProSieben had 70 employees at that time and claimed to reach 2.44 million viewers.

The station began broadcasting on the DFS Kopernikus satellite in July 1989. Broadcasting hours were gradually increased to 17 hours a day. ProSieben was also awarded the first terrestrial frequency in Munich for a private broadcaster. Starting on 8 December 1989, the station was broadcast via Astra 1A satellite.

On 1 March 1990, the television station moved from Munich-Schwabing to Unterföhring near Munich. At that time, ProSieben had 120 employees. ProSieben has broadcast its programs around the clock since 1 October 1990.

In 1991, ProSieben created a subsidiary called Teledirekt GmbH to promote the spread of satellite technology in Germany. In 1992, although ProSieben was still losing money, it co-founded a special-interest channel, Der Kabelkanal, with German Bundespost TELEKOM. ProSieben held a 45% share. Since initially the channel could only be received via cable connection, the channel helped attract new customers to for Telekom's cable television network. In 1995, ProSieben bought the channel outright and renamed it Kabel 1, and began broadcasting it on the SES Astra satellite.

In July 1992 MGM Media Gruppe München (Seven.One Media today) was established. It was responsible for selling advertising on ProSieben channels. On 24 September 1993, SZM Studios (broadcasting center in Munich, since June 2004: ProSiebenSat.1 Produktion GmbH) was inaugurated. At the end of 1993, ProSieben made a profit for the first time.

=== 1994–1999 ===
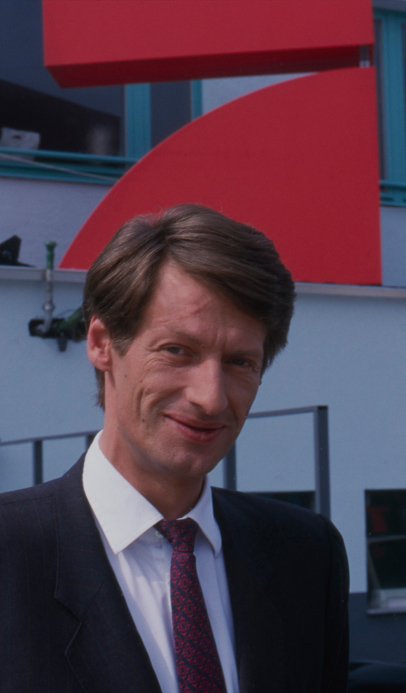
Thomas Kirch in 1995

In 1994, ProSieben started a teletext service. On 24 October 1994, the network started using a new station identity while also introducing what is now their current logo. Turnover in 1994 was DM 1.192 billion (now about €786 million) and pre-tax profit was DM 144 million (today about €95 million). On 19 December 1995, ProSieben Television GmbH was transformed into a joint-stock company called ProSieben Television AG (after 1996 ProSieben Media AG, since 2000 ProSiebenSat.1 Media AG). Thomas Kirch remained the main shareholder and the Rewe Group was a co-shareholder with 41.6 percent. The chairman was Georg Kofler.

In 1996, ProSieben was granted a nationwide broadcast license and launched its Internet site. That same year, ProSieben bought AT & TV Merchandising Concepts GmbH and Merchandising München KG. Sales rose to DM 1.69 billion.

Wholly owned subsidiaries of Pro Sieben Media AG in 1998 (incomplete list):

- Asta Vista
- Starwatch Navigation
- MGM Mediagruppe
- Agentur für Urheberrechte
- Pro Sieben Business Communication
- Pro Sieben Home Entertainment
- ddp news agency

Advertising slots were added for Switzerland in 1997 and Austria in 1998. ProSieben Austria also had its own news broadcast (ProSieben Austria News, formerly ProSieben Austria TopNews). Together with RTL, ProSieben operated a combined slot in Switzerland, which was cancelled after seven months in the spring of 2000. In Austria, there is a program slot on ProSieben Austria, Sat.1 Österreich and kabel eins Austria, which has been continuously expanded. In cooperation with the Austrian station Puls 4, the three-hour morning show Café Puls has been broadcast on all three stations since 2004.

On 7 July 1997, ProSieben went public, the shares were oversubscribed 50-fold. This way a nonvoting preference was used to divide up the shares. A year later, the company was added to MDAX. Berlin brought the inauguration of the DM 12 million ProSieben building in 1998. Kirch Media AG held 58.4% of ProSieben Media AG in 1998.

A news channel, N24 was started in 1999, it went on the air in early 2000. ProSieben wanted to compete with n-tv, which was very popular, mainly because of the stock market boom, and enlarge its family of channels. N24 now has a bigger audience share than n-tv, but is no longer owned by the company. In 1998, ProSieben took over the news agency ddp.

On 19 September 1999, ProSieben began broadcasting digital multichannel sound in Dolby Digital format.

=== 2000–2007 ===
At the end of 1999, Thomas Kirch brought over his shares in KirchMedia, his father's company, which then made up the majority shares of Sat.1 and ProSieben-Gruppe. On 1 February 2000, the Swiss business lawyer Urs Rohner was appointed CEO of ProSieben; Georg Kofler, who was the CEO of ProSieben since its inception, resigned from the company. Urs Rohner had no experience in the television business. He was appointed at the request of Leo Kirch to legally secure the fusion between Sat.1 and ProSieben.

In March 2000, the ProSieben subsidiary SevenSenses was established, to which in June 2004 merged with the SZM Studios to create the ProSiebenSat.1 Produktion GmbH. On 13 October 2000, 12 years after the founding of ProSieben, the first shares from ProSiebenSat.1 Media AG were traded at the Frankfurt Stock Exchange. In the following month, the merger of the marketing companies occurred between Media Group Munich (ProSieben) and MEDIA 1, creating SevenOne Media.

With the merger came the founding of the ProSieben Television GmbH, which operates the ProSieben television station.

Managing director of ProSieben was Nicolas Paalzow in 2000. He was succeeded in May 2004 by Dejan Jocic, who was then replaced in December 2005 by Andreas Bartl - who was previously CEO of kabel eins. In May 2008, Thilo Proff became chief of the station, followed by Jürgen Hörner (April 2011). Since August 2012, Wolfgang Link is the managing director of ProSieben.

After 2003, the ProSiebenSat.1 Media belonged to a group of investors surrounding Haim Saban.

In 2005, Axel Springer SE wanted to take over ProSieben for about €2.2 billion, which would have created the third-largest media group in Europe. This purchase, however, at the end of 2005 / beginning of 2006 was not authorized by the Federal Cartel Office and the Commission on Concentration in the Media. On 31 January 2006, Springer finally announced the failure of the takeover. Saban stuck to the intention to sell the channel. On 14 December 2006, the investment companies KKR and Permira took over a majority shares (50.5%) of the stock capital of ProSiebenSat.1 Media AG and became new majority shareholder.

In 2007, through the initiative of KKR and Permira, ProSieben bought the SBS Broadcasting Group, for €3.3 billion and financed the acquisition largely through loans.

=== Post-2007 ===
On 12 February 2015, ProSieben launched a new on-air design, focusing on "new dimensions". Its slogan and sound trademark remained unchanged. The new look debuted at 8:13 pm, just before the premiere of season 10 of Germany's Next Topmodel.

== Programmes ==
=== Current foreign series ===
- 2 Broke Girls
- Don't Trust the B— in Apartment 23 (Apartment 23) (reruns)
- Are You There, Chelsea? (2013–present)
- Brickleberry (reruns)
- Cougar Town (reruns)
- Empire (2015, 2017–present)
- Family Guy (reruns) (2002–present)
- Friends (reruns) (2000–present)
- Fringe (Fringe – Grenzfälle des FBI) (2009–present)
- Futurama (reruns)
- Gotham (2015–present)
- Grey's Anatomy (Grey's Anatomy – Die jungen Ärzte) (2006–present)
- How I Met Your Mother (2008–present)
- Last Man Standing (2017–present)
- Legends of Tomorrow (2016–present)
- Malcolm in the Middle (Malcolm mittendrin) (reruns)
- Man with a Plan (2017–present)
- Mike & Molly (reruns)
- Mom (2014–present)
- My Boys (reruns)
- Pure Genius (2017–present)
- Scrubs (Scrubs – Die Anfänger) (reruns)
- Siren (Mysterious Mermaids) (2018–present)
- Station 19 (Seattle Firefighters - Die jungen Helden) (2018–present)
- Supergirl (2016–present)
- Superstore (2017–present)
- The Big Bang Theory (2009–present)
- The Flash (2015–present)
- The Great Indoors (2018–present)
- The Mick (2017–present)
- The Middle (reruns)
- The Millers (Die Millers) (2014–present)
- The Orville (2018–present)
- The Real O'Neals (2018–present)
- The Simpsons (Die Simpsons) (1994–present)
- This Is Us (2017–present)
- Two and a Half Men (first season named Mein cooler Onkel Charlie) (2005–present)
- Young Sheldon (2018–present)
- Younger (2018–present)

=== Current German programmes ===
- Galileo (1998–present)
- Galileo Big Pictures (every few weeks, another episode with a different topic is released) (2009–present)
- Germany's Next Topmodel
- Late Night Berlin, hosted by Klaas Heufer-Umlauf (2018–present)
- :newstime
- :newstime Spätnachrichten
- Prankenstein (2015–present)
- red! Stars, Lifestyle & More
- Schlag den Star (since 2016 with Elton as host)
- Ein sehr gutes Quiz (mit hoher Gewinnsumme) (2024–present)
- taff (1995–present)
- Joko gegen Klaas – Das Duell um die Welt (3 episodes a year, usually starting around November)
- Joko und Klaas gegen ProSieben, hosted by Klaas Heufer-Umlauf and Joko Winterscheidt (2019–present)
- red! (2008–present)
- Watch Me – Das Kinomagazin (2016–present)
- The Voice of Germany (2011–present)

==== Event show ====
- Bundesvision Song Contest (annually)
- Die Beste Show der Welt (The Best Show in the World – 8 episodes)
- TV total events:
  - Turmspringen (diving, annually)
  - PokerStars.de-Nacht (poker, monthly)
  - Stock Car Crash Challenge (like banger racing on a muddy indoor track, annually)
  - Wok-WM (annually)
  - Autoball (football with cars and a very big ball, every two years)

=== Former foreign series ===
- 8 Simple Rules (Meine wilden Töchter)
- 90210 (2009)
- Alias (Alias – Die Agentin) (2003–2004, 2007–2008)
- Aliens in America (2009, 2015)
- American Horror Story (2013)
- Angel (Angel - Jäger der Finsternis) (2001–2005)
- Body of Proof (2011)
- Booker (1993–1994)
- Brothers & Sisters (2007)
- Buffy the Vampire Slayer (Buffy – Im Bann der Dämonen) (1998–2005)
- Charmed (Charmed – Zauberhafte Hexen)
- Chuck (2009, 2013–2016)
- Code Black (2016–2017)
- Cold Case (Cold Case – Kein Opfer ist je vergessen)
- Crisis (2016)
- Dawson's Creek (2001–2004)
- Desperate Housewives
- Devious Maids (Devious Maids - Schmutzige Geheimnisse) (2014)
- Diagnosis: Murder (Diagnose: Mord) (1993–1998)
- Doctor Who (2008)
- Don't Trust the B— in Apartment 23 (Apartment 23)
- Early Edition (Allein gegen die Zukunft)
- Empire (2015–2017)
- ER (Emergency Room – Die Notaufnahme)
- Eureka (EUReKA – Die geheime Stadt) (2008–2013)
- Everybody Hates Chris (Alle hassen Chris)
- Everybody Loves Raymond (Alle lieben Raymond)
- Falling Skies (2011–2012, 2015)
- Family Matters (Alle unter einem Dach) (1995–2003)
- FlashForward (2010)
- Friends (2000–2006, 2015)
- Ghost Whisperer (Ghost Whisperer - Stimmen aus dem Jenseits)
- Gossip Girl
- Greek (2010)
- Grounded for Life (Keine Gnade für Dad)
- Harper's Island
- Hawthorne
- Highway to Heaven (Ein Engel auf Erden) (1991–1992)
- Homeland
- Hope & Faith (2013)
- Hotel (1994)
- Human Target
- Joey (2008–2011)
- Kung Fu: The Legend Continues (Kung Fu - Im Zeichen des Drachen) (1994–1997)
- Kyle XY (2007–2010)
- Legend of the Seeker (Legend of the Seeker - Das Schwert der Wahrheit)
- Limitless (2017)
- Lipstick Jungle
- Lost (2005–2014)
- Lucifer (2017)
- Married... with Children (Eine schrecklich nette Familie)
- Matlock (1992–1997, 2001)
- Medical Investigation
- Moonlight (2008, 2010–2011, 2014)
- My Wife and Kids (What's Up, Dad?)
- New Girl
- Nip/Tuck
- Numb3rs (Numb3rs - Die Logik des Verbrechens) (2005)
- One Life to Live (Liebe, Lüge, Leidenschaft) (1989–1990)
- One Tree Hill (2007–2008)
- Perfect Strangers (Ein Grieche erobert Chicago)
- Primeval (Primeval – Rückkehr der Urzeitmonster)
- Primeval: New World
- Private Practice
- Pushing Daisies
- Quantico (2016)
- Queer as Folk
- Reaper
- Roseanne
- Sabrina, the Teenage Witch (Sabrina – total verhext!)
- Scream Queens
- Seinfeld (1998–2003)
- Sex and the City (2001–2008)
- Sliders (Sliders – Das Tor in eine fremde Dimension)
- Space: Above and Beyond (Space 2063)
- Spartacus: Vengeance
- Star Wars: The Clone Wars (2008–2010)
- Spartacus: Gods of the Arena
- Suburgatory (2012–2015)
- Supernatural
- Surface (2006–2007)
- T. J. Hooker (1992–1994)
- Taz-Mania (Tazmania) (1994–1998)
- Terminator: The Sarah Connor Chronicles
- Terra Nova (2012)
- The 100 (2015–2016)
- The 4400 (4400 – Die Rückkehrer) (2006–2009)
- The Bugs Bunny Show (1989-1998)
- The Good Wife (2010)
- The L Word (The L Word – Wenn Frauen Frauen lieben)
- The Muppets (2016–2017)
- The New Normal (2013)
- The O.C. (O.C., California)
- The Odd Couple (Odd Couple)
- The Royals (2015)
- The Shield (The Shield - Gesetz der Gewalt) (2004)
- The Smurfs (1995)
- The Strain (2015)
- The Tudors (2008-2011)
- The Vampire Diaries
- The X-Files (Akte X – Die unheimlichen Fälle des FBI)
- Three's Company (Herzbube mit 2 Damen) (1993–1995)
- Touch (2012)
- V (V – Die Besucher) (2011)
- Weeds (Weeds – Kleine Deals unter Nachbarn) (2007)
- Without A Trace (2003-2004)

=== Former German programmes ===
- 17 Meter - Wie weit kannst du gehn?, hosted by Klaas Heufer-Umlauf and Joko Winterscheidt (2011–2012)
- 18 – Allein unter Mädchen (2004–2007)
- Absolute Mehrheit (talk show on politics, every three months) (2012–2013)
- Alles außer Sex (2005–2007)
- Arabella, hosted by Arabella Kiesbauer (1994–2004)
- Arabella Night, hosted by Arabella Kiesbauer (1996–1997)
- Avenzio – Schöner leben!
- Axel! will's wissen!
- Bravo TV (2005–2007)
- Bully & Rick
- Bullyparade (1997–2011)
- CineTipp
- Circus HalliGalli, hosted by Klaas Heufer-Umlauf and Joko Winterscheidt (2013–2017)
- comedystreet (2002–2013)
- Crazy Competition
- Das Duell um die Geld, hosted by Klaas Heufer-Umlauf and Joko Winterscheidt (2016–2017)
- Das Geständnis – Heute sage ich alles
- Der kleine Mann
- Die ProSieben Märchenstunde
- Die ProSieben MorningShow (2009)
- Die Reporter (1992–2000)
- Focus TV (1996–2009)
- Fort Boyard (2000, 2002)
- Galileo Mystery
- Joko und Klaas – Die Rechnung geht auf uns
- Kalkofes Mattscheibe (2003–2008, 2010, 2012)
- Lebe deinen Traum!
- Mein bester Feind, hosted by Klaas Heufer-Umlauf and Joko Winterscheidt (2014–2016)
- Night-Loft (2005–2011)
- Noch Besserwissen (reruns)
- Ahnungslos
- Popstars (2003–2012)
- Prompt (2004–2005)
- ProSieben Funny Movie
- ProSieben Reportage
- ProSieben Spätnachrichten
- Prosieben Spezial – Wissen Weltweit
- Quatsch Comedy Club (1997–2015)
- Quizboxen (lit. 'quiz boxing')
- SAM (1995–2009)
- Schlag den Henssler, hosted by Elton (2017–2018)
- Schlag den Raab, hosted by Steven Gätjen (2006–2015)
- Stromberg (2004–2015)
- Studio Amani (2016)
- superspots – Die besten Clips im Umlauf (reruns)
- Switch (reruns)
- Switch reloaded
- talk talk talk (1999–2016)
- talk talk talk fun (2006–2007)
- The Next Uri Geller (2008–2009)
- TV total, hosted by Stefan Raab (1999–2015)
- U20 – Deutschland, deine Teenies
- Unter fremden Decken
- Wunderwelt Wissen

=== Former programming blocks ===
- Trick 7 (1991–2004)

== Logos ==
First logo used from 1989 to 23 October 1994

Current logo used since 24 October 1994

ProSieben HD logo since 12 February 2015

== Audience share ==
=== Germany ===
	January	February	March	April	May	June	July	August	September	October	November	December	Annual average
1990	-	-	-	-	-	-	-	-	-	-	-	-	1.3%
1991	-	-	-	-	-	-	-	-	-	-	-	-	▲3.8%
1992	-	-	-	-	-	-	-	-	-	-	-	-	▲6.5%
1993	-	-	-	-	-	-	-	-	-	-	-	-	▲9.2%
1994	-	-	-	-	-	-	-	-	-	-	-	-	▲9.4%
1995	-	-	-	-	-	-	-	-	-	-	-	-	▲9.9%
1996	9.8%	9.6%	9.8%	9.4%	9.7%	8.9%	8.9%	9.0%	10.1%	10.2%	9.2%	9.4%	▼9.5%
1997	9.7%	9.3%	9.7%	9.0%	9.1%	9.6%	9.3%	9.2%	9.6%	9.6%	9.3%	9.0%	▼9.4%
1998	9.4%	8.0%	8.2%	8.3%	9.3%	7.9%	8.4%	8.7%	9.0%	9.0%	9.2%	9.1%	▼8.7%
1999	8.9%	8.7%	8.5%	8.6%	8.0%	8.3%	8.3%	8.3%	8.2%	8.6%	8.6%	7.8%	▼8.4%
2000	8.5%	8.5%	8.1%	8.3%	8.5%	8.0%	8.1%	8.4%	8.1%	8.2%	8.3%	7.9%	▼8.2%
2001	8.2%	8.4%	8.5%	8.8%	8.7%	8.5%	7.4%	7.7%	7.7%	7.7%	7.8%	7.2%	▼8.0%
2002	7.6%	6.7%	7.4%	7.4%	6.7%	6.3%	6.7%	6.7%	7.4%	7.5%	7.1%	7.2%	▼7.1%
2003	7.3%	6.9%	7.1%	7.3%	7.3%	7.0%	6.5%	6.5%	7.4%	7.3%	7.4%	6.7%	▼7.0%
2004	6.9%	7.1%	7.5%	7.2%	7.2%	6.7%	7.1%	6.1%	7.4%	7.5%	7.0%	6.7%	7.0%
2005	6.6%	6.8%	7.0%	7.1%	6.8%	6.8%	6.4%	6.6%	6.5%	6.7%	6.4%	6.1%	▼6.7%
2006	6.5%	5.9%	6.8%	6.8%	6.5%	5.6%	6.2%	6.7%	7.3%	7.4%	7.1%	6.3%	▼6.6%
2007	6.3%	6.0%	6.6%	6.8%	6.9%	7.0%	6.4%	6.4%	6.5%	6.4%	6.6%	6.2%	▼6.5%
2008	6.5%	6.6%	6.8%	6.8%	7.2%	6.0%	6.6%	5.9%	7.0%	6.9%	6.6%	6.5%	▲6.6%
2009	6.3%	6.1%	6.7%	6.7%	7.0%	6.3%	5.9%	6.4%	6.8%	6.9%	7.1%	6.7%	6.6%
2010	6.3%	5.8%	6.6%	6.9%	6.8%	5.6%	5.9%	6.4%	6.6%	6.5%	6.3%	6.0%	▼6.3%
2011	5.7%	5.7%	5.9%	6.4%	6.3%	6.8%	6.2%	6.0%	6.5%	6.8%	6.5%	6.2%	▼6.2%
2012	5.9%	5.7%	6.1%	6.4%	6.2%	5.2%	6.0%	5.5%	5.7%	6.0%	6.1%	5.8%	▼5.9%
2013	5.1%	5.5%	5.3%	5.4%	5.9%	5.9%	5.9%	5.5%	6.0%	6.0%	6.0%	6.0%	▼5.7%
2014	5.4%	5.4%	5.6%	5.6%	5.6%	4.6%	5.2%	6.0%	5.9%	5.9%	5.7%	5.5%	▼5.5%
2015	5.1%	5.3%	5.4%	5.4%	5.5%	5.2%	5.3%	5.5%	5.1%	5.4%	5.4%	5.4%	▼5.3%
2016	5.2%	5.2%	5.3%	5.2%	5.4%	4.4%	4.7%	4.7%	4.8%	5.4%	5.1%	5.1%	▼5.0%
2017	4.7%	4.5%	4.7%	4.8%	4.6%	4.5%	4.1%	3.9%	4.5%	4.7%	4.8%	4.2%	▼4.5%
2018	4.0%	4.1%	4.4%	4.6%	4.5%								

Market share of ProSieben in the years 1990–2016

The average age of the viewers is 37.4 years (as of 2016).
