= Jörg Wontorra =

German television presenter and sports journalist

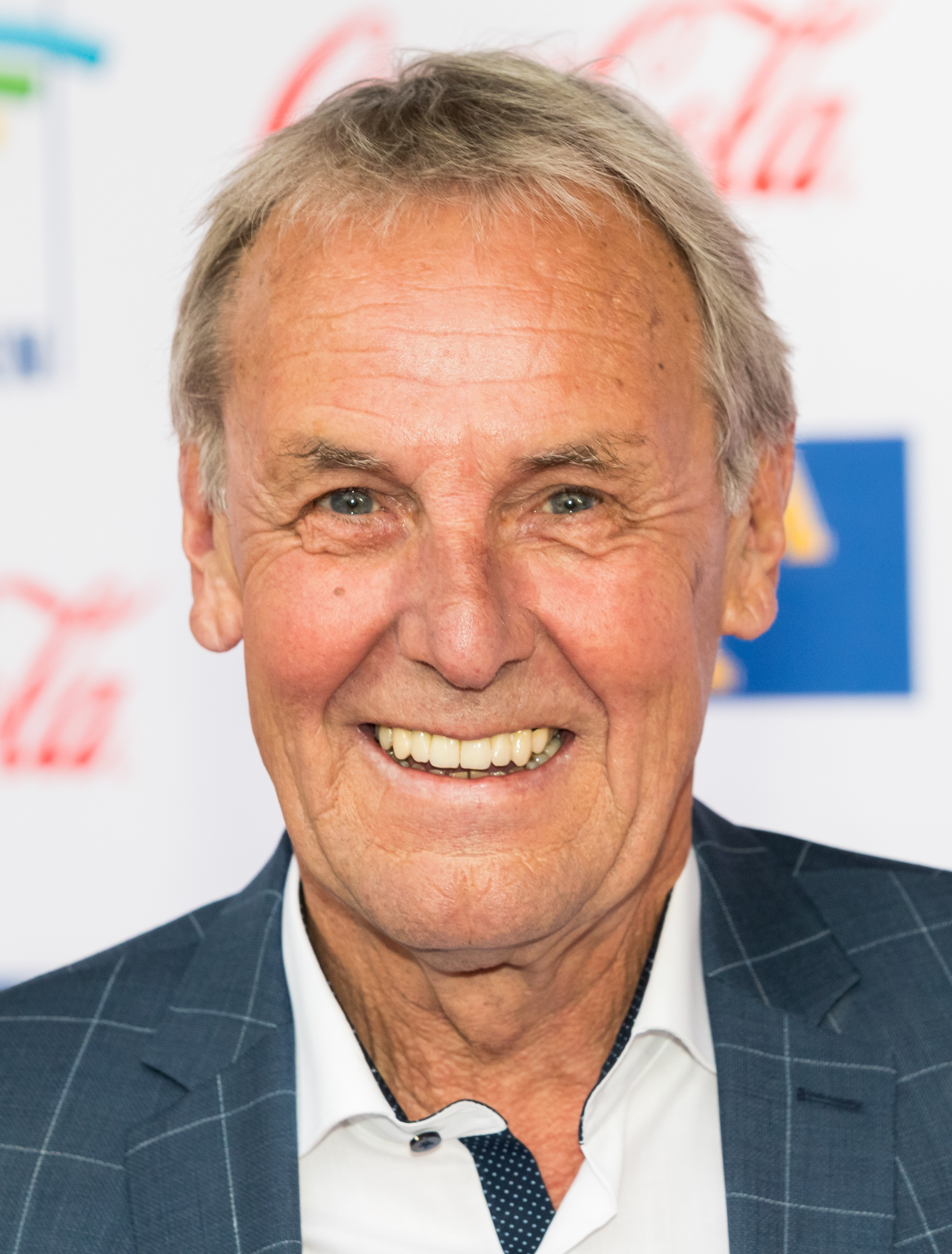
Wontorra in 2019

Jörg Wontorra (born 29 November 1948 in Lübeck) is a German television presenter and sports journalist.

Wontorra lives in Marbella, Spain. He has two children, Marcel and Laura.

== Awards ==
- Bayerischer Fernsehpreis, 2010
- Silberne Kugel 1989
- SportBILD Lifetime Achievement Award
- Goldene Kamera 1988

== Books ==
- Wontorra, Jörg (1997). Halbzeit mit Helden Geschichten, die der Fußball schreibt (in German). Düsseldorf: ECON. ISBN 978-3-430-19823-3. OCLC 237318425.
