= Kabel eins Doku =

German television network

kabel eins Doku
- Country: Germany
- Broadcast area: Germany, Austria
- Network: kabel eins
- Headquarters: Unterföhring, Germany

Programming
- Language: German
- Picture format: 576i (16:9 SDTV); 1080i (HDTV)

Ownership
- Owner: ProSiebenSat.1 Media
- Sister channels: kabel eins kabel eins Classics; SAT.1; SAT.1 Emotions; SAT.1 Gold; ProSieben; ProSieben Fun; ProSieben Maxx sixx

History
- Launched: 22 September 2016; 9 years ago

Links
- Website: www.kabeleinsdoku.de

kabel eins Doku is a free-to-air television channel owned by ProSiebenSat.1 Media. A sister channel of kabel eins, the channel went on air on 22 September 2016. It broadcasts documentaries.

== Audience share ==
=== Germany ===
	January	February	March	April	May	June	July	August	September	October	November	December	Annual average
2016	-	-	-	-	-	-	-	-	0.0%	0.1%	0.2%	0.2%	
2017	0.2%	0.2%	0.2%	0.2%	0.3%	0.3%	0.3%	0.3%	0.3%	0.3%	0.4%	0.4%	0.3%
2018	0.4%	0.4%	0.4%	0.5%	0.5%								
