= ProSiebenSat.1 Media =

German mass media company

ProSiebenSat.1 Media SE
- Formerly: ProSieben Television GmbH (1988–1995); ProSieben Television AG (1995–2000); ProSiebenSat.1 Media AG (2000–2015)
- Type: Public
- Traded as: FWB: PSM
- ISIN: DE000PSM7770
- Industry: Mass media
- Predecessor: Sat.1 SatellitenFernsehen GmbH
- Founded: 13 October 1988; 38 years ago
- Headquarters: Unterföhring, Germany
- Key people: Bert Habets (chairman of the Executive Board); Andreas Wiele (chairman of the Supervisory Board)
- Products: Broadcasting, Free-to-air and subscription television, television production, cable, dating, commerce, ventures
- Revenue: €3.852 billion (2023)
- Operating income: €406 million (2023)
- Net income: €-124 million (2023)
- Total assets: €5.904 billion (2023)
- Total equity: €5.904 billion (2023)
- Owners: MediaForEurope (75.61%)
- Number of employees: 7,188 (2023)
- Divisions: Entertainment; Commerce & Dating
- Website: prosiebensat1.com

ProSiebenSat.1 Media SE (officially abbreviated as P7S1, formerly ProSiebenSat.1 Media AG) is a German mass media and digital company based in Unterföhring near Munich. MediaForEurope owns 75.61% of the company. It operates in three segments: Entertainment, Dating and Commerce & Ventures. The company is listed on the Frankfurt Stock Exchange.

== History ==
KirchMedia GmbH & Co. KG aA became the majority shareholder in ProSieben Media AG at the end of 1999. ProSieben Media AG merges with another Kirch group subsidiary, Sat.1 SatellitenFernsehen GmbH, in 2000. The newly created company controlled various TV channels such as Sat.1, ProSieben and Kabel Eins. Since 2 October 2000, the shares of ProSieben Media AG have been traded under the name ProSiebenSat.1 Media AG (ProSiebenSat.1) on the Frankfurt Stock Exchange. As part of the integration of Sat.1, ProSieben Television GmbH was established.

=== Collapse of the Kirch group and takeover by Haim Saban ===
The company nearly merged with KirchMedia GmbH in 2002, but the merger failed due to the Kirch group's insolvency. The ProSiebenSat.1 stock price crashed following the failed merger.

In 2003, the creditors' committee chose P7S1 Holding, a subsidiary of Haim Saban's Saban Capital Group, as the buyer of 71.98 percent of the voting rights, making it the new main shareholder of ProSiebenSat.1. Saban took over the company for €500 million. The remaining 11.49 percent were held by Axel Springer and 16.53 percent by the Kirch Group, each through an investment company.

After the takeover through P7S1 Holding, the company was restructured, and some TV shows were cancelled. The company's TV channels, aimed at an age group of 14 to 49 years, had a market share of more than 30 percent and earned €1.8 billion in 2002, making a profit of €21 million. In the same year, the company had over 3000 employees.

When chairman Urs Rohner left the company by 30 April 2004 "at his own request", Belgian Guillaume de Posch became the new chairman.

In 2005, Axel Springer Verlag offered to buy the company for €3 billion, but this purchase was blocked by the Federal Cartel Office and the Commission on Concentration in the Media. Springer announced it would withdraw the offer on 31 January 2006.

=== Takeover by Permira and KKR ===
Haim Saban's shares were bought by Permira, a private equity company, and Kohlberg Kravis Roberts (KKR) for about €3 billion on 14 December 2006. The shareholding was merged with Permira and KKR's other European media shareholding SBS Broadcasting Group. SBS was made up of 19 private TV channels, 20 Pay television channels and radio stations. This made the merged company the second-largest television provider in Europe.

On 16 July 2007, the corporation announced the reduction of 180 jobs (100 of which in Berlin and 80 in Munich) until 2009. On the same day, two boulevard shows at Sat.1 were cancelled. Subsequently, further news shows were also to be cancelled or downsized.

On 10 December 2007, the Axel Springer AG announced a complete pull-out from ProSiebenSat.1 and the sale of their 12 percent of common stock and preferred stock to KKR and Permira for €509 million. This transaction was concluded on 16 January 2008. Therefore, Lavena Holding 5, which was jointly controlled by KKR and Permira, received 5 percent of the common stock as well as 25 percent of the non-preferred stock.

Upon the takeover of SBS by ProSiebenSat.1 in Summer 2007, KKR and Permira offered an option to the other owner, Telegraaf Media Groep (TMG), for 12 percent of the common stock if they renounce their right of pre-emption. In June 2008, TMG announced the acquisition of shares of the company without their right of pre-emption. This deal concluded in August of the same year.

At the end of 2008, Guillaume de Posch left the company at his own request. Between March 2009 and February 2018, Thomas Ebeling was the company's CEO.

In October 2009, the TV channel group had debts totalling more than €3.4 billion and they only paid the taxes for the loan. The group saved especially on program expenditures.

After selling the TV channels in Belgium and the Netherlands, owned by ProSiebenSat.1, for €1.225 billion to an international media consortium led by the Finnish group Sanoma on 29 July 2011, the entirety of Scandinavian channels was sold to the American Discovery Communications Inc. for €1.325 billion in December 2012. The proceeds were intended to settle final liabilities amounting to around €500 million and to finance an increase in the dividend to around €5.60 per share. Not included in the deal were the production companies.

In March 2012, Red Arrow Entertainment Group announced that they've acquired a majority stake in British unscripted production outfit CPL Productions marking Red Arrow's first move into the British unscripted market.

In mid-February 2013, the capital investors Permira and KKR started to sell all preferred shares in Lavena Holding 1, which amounted to 18 percent. The stock packet was sold at the Frankfurt Stock Exchange for close to €485 million (€24.60 per share). As a result of the sale, all preference shares, or 50 percent of the share capital, were in free float.

=== KKR and Permira exit ===
At the annual general meeting on 23 July 2013, the ProSiebenSat.1 shareholders approved the merger of the previously listed preferred shares and the common shares held by KKR and Permira. As a result, only the voting common shares were traded on Frankfurt Stock Exchange. Following the conversion, KKR and Permira held 44 percent of the common shares, thus no longer holding a majority. The capital investors also decided with the Telegraaf Media Groep to sell their interest in tranches at the stock exchange.

On 19 August 2013, the ProSiebenSat.1 Media AG finished its initial public offering, resulting in only the previously unlisted common shares being listed on the MDAX since then.

On 4 and 6 September, Lavena Holding and Telegraaf Media Groep sold 17 percent of their shares to institutional investors. Therefore, the shares of KKR and Permira decreases to 33 percent and the Telegraaf Media Groep completely sold their shares and was no longer a shareholder.

At the end of 2013, ProSiebenSat.1 announced the sale of the rest of its Eastern European holdings. The Hungarian TV channels were sold in a management buyout. In Romania, all TV and radio channels, except for Prima TV, which was to be acquired by Romanian entrepreneur Cristian Burci, were taken over by the Greek Antenna Group. The takeovers were completed in the first quarter of 2014.

On 17 January 2014, KKR and Permira sold their remaining shares. The same year, the adjusted group net income grew to €550 million and General Atlantic acquired a minority stake in the broadcaster's digital division.

In a press release on 15 October 2014, ProSiebenSat.1 announced its plan to convert to ProSiebenSat.1 Media SE in the summer of 2015. On 21 March 2016, the company moved from the MDAX to the DAX.

To further expand its business sectors, ProSiebenSat.1 Media SE conducted a capital increase in November 2016 by issuing 14.2 million new shares at €36.25 each. The resulting proceeds of €515 million increased the share capital by 6.5 percent. This led to a subsequent share price drop of nearly six percent on the Frankfurt Stock Exchange.

On 19 March 2018 the company was removed from the DAX stock market index, and listed in the MDAX.

On 1 June 2018, Max Conze succeeded Thomas Ebeling as CEO of ProSiebenSat.1 Media SE. Due to the departure of several senior ProSiebenSat.1 managers and negative criticism from Deputy CEO Conrad Albert about Conze's management style in an interview with Süddeutsche Zeitung, Conze had to leave the company with immediate effect on 26 March 2020. Albert, in turn, left the company on 30 April 2020. From 26 March 2020 to October 2022, Rainer Beaujean became the CEO of ProSiebenSat.1 Media SE, though he left the company "in agreement with the Supervisory Board" at his own request. Since 1 November 2022, Bert Habets, the former CEO of RTL Group's Group Management Committee, has been holding the position.

=== Mediaset takes control ===
In May 2019, the Italian company Mediaset (Mediaset S.p.A.) bought 9.6 percent of ProSiebenSat.1 for €330 million. In November 2019, Mediaset held 15.1 percent of the German broadcaster. The transaction took place through the subsidiary Mediaset España, which acquired a 5.5 percent stake in the capital. On 23 March 2020, Mediaset España purchased a further 4.28 percent of the share capital equal to 4.35 percent of the voting rights, bringing Mediaset's stake to 20.1 percent.

In March 2022, Mediaset announced that it held more than 25 percent of the company's shares. In December 2022, MFE informed the Austrian Federal Competition Authority of its intention to acquire "sole control of ProSiebenSat.1 Media SE", requesting a review of the planned acquisition. The German Journalists Association, the trade union Ver.di, and Bavarian Premier Markus Söder warned against a takeover in December 2022.

In February 2023, Renáta Kellnerová, through PPF Group, acquired a 9.01 percent stake in ProSiebenSat.1 Media SE, becoming the media company's second-largest shareholder.

By 4 September 2025, MFE had increased its ownership stake to 75.61%.

== Corporate affairs ==
The key indicators of ProSiebenSat.1 are (as of 31 December of each year):

Year	Revenue (€m)	Net Profit (€m)	Number of employees (FTE)
2017	4,078	471	6,452
2018	4,009	248	6,532
2019	4,135	413	7,265
2020	4,047	267	7,128
2021	4,494	449	7,956
2022	4,163	5	7,501
2023	3,852	–124	7,188

== Shareholders ==
Shareholder structure as of 2024:

MediaForEurope; 75.61% common shares
Treasury shares 2.70% common shares	_{ProSiebenSat.1 Media SE}

== Divisions ==
=== Entertainment ===
==== Seven.One Entertainment Group ====
Since 1 October 2020, the Entertainment division has been operating as Seven.One Entertainment Group.

Seven.One Entertainment Group also includes Fem Media GmbH. In June 2008, ProSiebenSat.1 acquired Feeem Media GmbH, which was renamed Fem Media GmbH on 1 September 2008, and operates the women's portal fem.com. In 2010, the Fem network was rebranded as Sixx, while the fem.com website was retained. As part of this, Fem Media GmbH took over the operation of the channel's homepage, sixx.de.

==== German-language free-to-air and pay-TV channels ====
Germany	Austria	Switzerland
Free-to-air
Kabel Eins; Kabel Eins Doku; ProSieben; ProSieben Maxx; Sat.1; Sat.1 Gold; sixx	Kabel Eins Austria; Kabel Eins Doku Austria; ProSieben Austria; ProSieben Maxx Austria; Sat.1 Österreich; Sat.1 Gold Österreich; sixx Austria; Puls 4; Puls 24 News; ATV; ATV2	ProSieben Schweiz; ProSieben Maxx Schweiz; Sat.1 Schweiz; Sat.1. Gold Schweiz; Kabel Eins Schweiz; sixx Schweiz; Puls 8
Pay-TV
Kabel Eins classics; ProSieben Fun; Sat.1 Emotions; wetter.com TV		

==== Seven.One Studios ====
Seven.One Studios
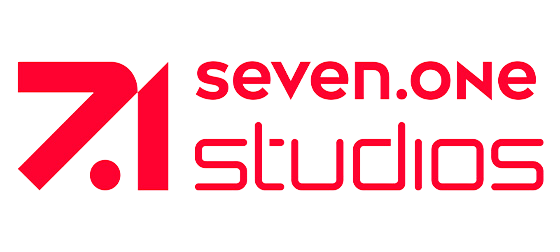
- The logo of Seven.One Studios
- Formerly: Red Arrow Entertainment Group (2010–2017); Red Arrow Studios (2017–2022)
- Type: Subsidiary
- ISIN: DE000PSM7770
- Industry: Entertainment
- Predecessor: The Collective
- Founded: 19 January 2010; 16 years ago
- Headquarters: Germany
- Parent: ProSiebenSat.1 Media
- Divisions: Seven.One Studios International

Seven.One Studios (formerly known as Red Arrow Entertainment Group and Red Arrow Studios) is a German film and television production and distribution holding company that is owned by ProSiebenSat1. Media that produces scripted and unscripted film and television content for ProSiebenSat1's channels and other networks internationally.

===== History =====
In May 2008, ProSiebenSat1.Media announced that they've launched a new reality television production company dedicated to light entertainment based in Munich named RedSeven Entertainment.

In January 2010, ProSiebenSat.1 Media had announced that it would restructure its television production, distribution and developing business for its international expansion by creating a new television production and distribution holding company for their existing assets to be named Red Arrow Entertainment Group with the newly created company becoming an international acquisition vehicle which would launch and acquire TV production companies in other countries. ProSiebenSat1.Media's international television distribution sales division SevenOne International was moved into the new holding company along with ProSiebenSat.1 Media's existing television production companies.

Two months later in March 2010, Red Arrow Entertainment Group had announced that they've acquired a 51% majority stake in leading Belgian television production company Sultan Sushi marking their first international acquisition and their first expansion into Belgium with the company's co-founders and CEOs Johan Tuyaerts, Caroline Vergauwen, and Jan Keersmaekers holding the remaining 49% stake in the company and will continue to lead the company under Red Arrow.

In September 2010, Red Arrow Entertainment Group had announced that they have acquired a 51% majority stake in Los Angeles-based American production company Kinetic Content.

In March 2011, Red Arrow Entertainment Group announced that they entered the British television industry by acquiring British production house The Mob, marking Red Arrow Entertainment Group's first UK acquisition.

In September 2011, Red Arrow Entertainment Group had announced that they've acquired a majority stake in American scripted television production company Fuse Entertainment expanding Red Arrow's American operations and their scripted portfolio with Swedish producer Henrik Bastin joining Red Arrow's acquired company Fuse Entertainment as their partner and CEO of Fuse Entertainment along with the company's founder Danish-born Mikkel Bondesen continued operating the company.

In March 2012, Red Arrow Entertainment Group announced that they have acquired a majority stake in British unscripted production outfit CPL Productions marking Red Arrow's first move into the British unscripted market. Three weeks later on March 19 of that same year, Red Arrow Entertainment Group announced that they have acquired British scripted production company Endor Productions.

In May 2012, Red Arrow Entertainment Group announced that they have acquired Israeli scripted and unscripted production company July August Productions.

In July 2012, Red Arrow Entertainment Group had announced that their worldwide television distribution division SevenOne International had been renamed to Red Arrow International to reflect their parent company

In February 2014, Red Arrow Entertainment Group announced they had acquired a majority stake in Half Yard Productions to breach its American unscripted production portfolio with Half Yard Productions became part of Red Arrow Entertainment Group while the latter's co-founders Abby Greensfelder and Sean Gallagher continued to run Half Yard Productions as co-CEOs under Red Arrow.

The group includes Studio71, which was founded in Berlin in September 2013 as a German-language multi-channel network by Sebastian Weil and Ronald Horstman and later acquired an American competitor, Collective Digital Studio.

In July 2016, Red Arrow Entertainment Group further extended its American production operations with them acquiring a 61% majority stake in Burbank-based American production studio 44 Blue Productions including its virtual reality studio Ovrture as 44 Blue Productions became a subsidiary of Red Arrow Entertainment Group with 44 Blue's founders Rasha Drachkovitch and Stephanie Noonan Drachkovitch continued leading 44 Blue Productions under Red Arrow while its distribution arm Red Arrow International would handle distribution to 44 Blue's future programming.

In January 2017, Red Arrow Entertainment Group's digital multi-channel and production subsidiary Studio71 announced that they had sold its 30% stake to the French TF1 and Italian Mediaset networks and announced that Studio71 was expanding its business by setting up local operations in the two countries by launching a French division in France and an Italian division in Italy.

In November 2017, Red Arrow Entertainment Group announced that they had purchased a majority interest in Cleveland-based American independent film distributor of independent films and documentaries Gravitas Ventures with the distribution company Gravitas Ventures maintaining their management and staff and continues to operate independently and will cooperate with Red Arrow Entertainment Group's own international distribution operation.

In December 2017, Studio71 and over 15 other companies were merged to create Red Arrow Studios.

In July 2022 when Chernin Entertainment founder & president and founder of The Chernin Group, Peter Chernin, had depatured The Chernin Group parent and announced that he had taken his film & television production company Chernin Entertainment & its unscripted production studio Words + Pictures and established a global independent and production content studio called The North Road Company, Red Arrow Studios exited the American television production industry had sold its American entertainment production operations (which were Half Yard Productioms, Left/Right, Kinetic Content, Dorsey Pictures and 44 Blue Productions) to Peter Chernin's new global production studio The North Road Company as it became subsidiarires of Chernin's new global content company.

In November 2022, four months after selling their American television production outfit to Peter Chernin's The North Road Company and the creation of two German production companies, Red Arrow Studios announced it was restructuring its international production and distribution operations and rebranding as Seven.One Studios; the international distribution division, Red Arrow Studios International, continued using the Red Arrow Studios name and its operations, following the sale of subsidiary Red Arrow Studios' U.S. production arm to the Peter Chernin-owned The North Road Company in July of that year and the creation of two German production companies, Cheerio Entertainment and Flat White Productions.

In June 2024, Seven.One Studios had announced that they've shutting down their London-based British scripted drama television production company Endor Productions.

In July 2024, its international distribution division, Red Arrow Studios International was rebranded to Seven.One Studios International.

===== Assets =====
Divisions and partial subsidiaries include:

- Cheerio Entertainment (Germany)
- Just Friends Productions (Germany)
- July August Productions (Israel)
- CPL Productions (United Kingdom)
  - Nit Television (joint venture with Harry Hill)
- Snowman Productions (Denmark)
- Endor Productions (United Kingdom)
- Pyjama Pictures (Germany)
- Redseven Entertainment (Germany)
  - Redseven Brand & Digital Studio
- Studio Flitz (Germany)

==== Joyn ====
In May 2017, ProSiebenSat.1 Media SE and Discovery formed a partnership to launch a mobile application called 7TV, which allows access to the broadcasters' media libraries. Additionally, the app served as a streaming platform for all ProSiebenSat.1 Media SE channels. The programme was expanded in March 2018 to include the channels Sport1, Welt, and N24 Doku. At the end of the year, a partnership with ZDF followed, integrating the channels ZDF, ZDFneo, and ZDFinfo into the 7TV app as well.

In June 2018, ProSiebenSat.1 Media SE and Discovery announced plans to create a streaming platform that would integrate the content from 7TV, Maxdome, and the Eurosport Player into one application. After Maxdome relocated its headquarters from Unterföhring to TV7 in Munich, it merged with the newly established 7TV Joint Venture GmbH on 15 January 2019.

In June 2019, the platform Joyn was launched, succeeding 7TV. In November 2019, the companies introduced the Joyn Plus+ service, which integrated content from the Maxdome platform. However, Maxdome continued to exist until 2020. By 2023, Joyn had over 6.3 million users. Additionally, by May 2021, the platform had already integrated more than 60 channels.

In 2022, ProSiebenSat.1 Media SE announced that its digital and app offerings would be consolidated on Joyn, including separate apps such as the ProSieben app. In September 2022, ProSiebenSat.1 Media SE took over the Joyn platform, buying out Discovery. Joyn went online in Austria in May 2023, replacing the streaming service Zappn. In June 2024, Joyn also launched in Switzerland.

==== Seven.One Audio ====
Seven.One Audio was founded in December 2020 and consolidates all the group's audio activities. In particular, Seven.One Audio markets 35 different podcasts in Germany. These include podcasts by Paul Ripke, Joko Winterscheidt and Klaas Heufer-Umlauf.

=== Commerce & Dating ===
==== eCommerce ====
The company formed NuCom in 2018, and soon after sold a 24.9 percent stake to General Atlantic, a private equity firm. On 14 April 2011, ProSiebenSat.1 Media SE announced the foundation of SevenVentures. SevenVentures acquired minority stakes in the online shops About You and Zalando, among other digital companies. In January 2014, the company acquired a 23 percent stake in the online retailer Amorelie. The following year, the NuCom Group became the majority shareholder of Amorelie and sold all its shares in 2021. Additionally, in May 2014, SevenVentures increased its stake in the online perfumery Flaconi to 47 percent, raised it to 100 percent a year later, and transferred its shares to the NuCom Group.

==== Dating & Video ====
In October 2018, NuCom bought eHarmony, an American dating website; it already held 94 percent of the similar German platform Parship.

In September 2020, ProSiebenSat.1 Media SE acquired the company The Meet Group. Previously, the dating platforms Parship and Elite Partner were part of the NuCom Group's business, but with the acquisition of The Meet Group, a merger of the platforms took place, resulting in the formation of the ParshipMeet Group. Besides Parship and Elite Partner, Lovoo and Tagged are also subsidiaries of the ParshipMeet Group.

General Atlantic holds a 45 percent stake in the company, while ProSiebenSat.1 Media SE holds 55 percent.

=== Former channels ===
sonnenklar.TV was sold to BigXtra in September 2005. The pan-Nordic C More Entertainment pay-TV operation (15 linear TV channels) was sold to TV4 in January 2009. 9Live was a commercial German participation TV channel launched on 1 September 2001 and lasted until 9 August 2011. Sat.1 Comedy was replaced by Sat.1 Emotions in 2012. The subsidiary Booming was sold to the Danish company Blackwood Seven in May 2015.
