= ProSieben Maxx =

German free-to-air channel

- Country: Germany
- Broadcast area: Nationally; Also distributed in other European countries on cable and satellite
- Network: ProSieben
- Headquarters: Unterföhring, Germany

Programming
- Language: German
- Picture format: 576i (16:9 SDTV); 1080i (HDTV)

Ownership
- Owner: ProSiebenSat.1 Media
- Sister channels: ProSieben; ProSieben Fun kabel eins kabel eins Doku kabel eins classics Sat.1; Sat.1 Emotions; Sat.1 Gold sixx

History
- Launched: 3 September 2013; 13 years ago (SD); 20 September 2013; 12 years ago (HD)

Links
- Website: www.prosiebenmaxx.de

Availability

Terrestrial
- DVB-T2: Various; region dependent (HD / encrypted)

ProSieben Maxx ([pʁoː.ˈziːbn̩ maks], "ProSeven Maxx") is a German free-to-air channel owned by ProSiebenSat.1, being the sixth overall.

== History ==
On 30 July 2013 ProSieben Maxx received a DVB-T broadcasting licence for the region of Munich. On 13 August 2013, the channel began test broadcasts on these frequencies with some program trailers.

The channel started broadcasting on 3 September 2013 with the movie Captain America: The First Avenger at 8:15 p.m.

== Programming ==
=== Prime time ===
The channel mainly targets male viewers aged between 30 and 59. Some series like Episodes, Homeland and House of Cards are shown in the original English-language version with German subtitles. No payment is required needed the original versions. ProSieben Maxx also broadcasts some movies, mostly on Thursdays. These movies are repeated a few hours later, not in English but instead dubbed into German.

=== Daytime ===
On 26 June 2013, ProSieben Maxx announced that it would broadcast programmes for kids and teens during the day. Later in the evening, the channel broadcasts programmes for the channel's main target group. The CEO of ProSieben Maxx, René Carl, told the German online magazine DWDL.de, that they would cooperate with m4e Entertainment & Mainstream Media to show anime and cartoon series up to eight to nine hours per day.

=== Animated series ===
- Black Clover (2020–present)
- Blue Exorcist (2018–2019)
- Bobobobs (Die Bobobobs) (2013-2016)
- Count Duckula (Graf Duckula) (2013-2014)
- Demon Slayer (2021–present)
- Detective Conan (2016–present)
- Dragon Ball (2014-2015)
- Dragon Ball Super (2017–2022)
- Dragon Ball Z Kai (2015–2022)
- Erased (2018–2019)
- Fairy Tail (2018–present)
- Family Guy (2013, 2016–present)
- Futurama (2013-2014, 2016–present)
- Inuyasha (2017–2021)
- Jackie Chan Adventures (2013-2015)
- Justice League (Die Liga der Gerechten) (2014)
- K (2018–2020)
- Men In Black: The Series (2013-2016)
- My Hero Academia (2022,2023-)
- Naruto (2013-2015, 2017–present)
- Naruto: Shippuden (2013–2020, 2023–present)
- Ned's Newt (Immer Ärger mit Newton) (2013–2014)
- Oggy and the Cockroaches (2013–2014)
- One Piece (2013–present)
- Pat & Mat (2013-2014)
- Pokémon (2013–2017)
- Shin-Chan (2020)
- Star Wars: The Clone Wars (2014)
- Storm Hawks (2013-2015)
- The Batman (2013)
- The Cramp Twins (Die Cramp Twins - Die Zoff Zwillinge) (2013-2014)
- The Looney Tunes Show (2013)
- The Simpsons (2019–present)
- The Three Friends and Jerry (Drei Freunde... und Jerry) (2013-2014)
- Yu-Gi-Oh! 5Ds (2014-2018, 2020)
- Yu-Gi-Oh! Arc-V (2015-2019)
- Yu-Gi-Oh! GX (2013-2016)
- Yu-Gi-Oh! Zexal (2014-2017)

=== Entertainment ===
- Big Bad BBQ Brawl (BBQ Fight Club) (2018–2020)
- Epic Meal Time (Epic Meal Empire) (2017–2018)
- Hotel Hell (2016–present)
- Man v. Food (2018–2021)
- Mission Adventure (2013–present)
- Never Ever Do This at Home (2017–2019)
- Special Forces: Ultimate Hell Week (Special Forces Bootcamp - Eine Woche in der Trainingshölle) (2016-2017)
- Steven liebt Kino! (2013-2015)
- What Went Down (World Wide Dummies - Krasse Clips aus dem Netz) (2016–2019)

=== Series ===
- Alphas (2015)
- Are You There, Chelsea? (2014)
- Awake (2014)
- Darüber... die Welt (2021)
- Chuck (2013-2014)
- Episodes (2013)
- Eureka (EUReKA - Die geheime Stadt) (2014–2018, 2022–present)
- Fringe (Fringe – Grenzfälle des FBI) (2013-2015)
- Ghosted (2020, 2022–present)
- Ghost Hunters (2021–present)
- Hard Knocks (2016–2022)
- Helix (2016–2018)
- Homeland (2013-2014)
- House of Cards (2013-2016)
- It's Always Sunny in Philadelphia (2013-2014)
- Joko gegen Klaas – Das Duell um die Welt (2013)
- Kung Fu (2015, 2017–2018)
- Last Man Standing (2013-2014, 2016)
- Minority Report (2016)
- Northern Exposure (Ausgerechnet Alaska) (2015)
- Sanctuary (2013-2015)
- Scrubs (Scrubs - Die Anfänger) (2014, 2016–2017)
- $#*! My Dad Says (2013, 2016)
- Spy (2013)
- Stargate Atlantis (2014-2016)
- Stargate SG-1 (2013-2016)
- Supernatural (2013–present)
- Terra Nova (2014-2015, 2017)
- The 4400 (4400 – Die Rückkehrer) (2015–2017)
- The Flash (2016, 2018–present)
- The Last Man on Earth (2017–2019)
- The Pacific (2014-2015)
- The Shield (The Shield - Gesetz der Gewalt) (2013-2014)
- The Strain (2017–2018)
- The Unit (The Unit - Eine Frage der Ehre) (2013-2014)
- The X-Files (2014–present)
- Two and a Half Men (2013–present)
- Warehouse 13 (2015-2016, 2018–2022)

=== Sports ===
- European League of Football
- World Rugby
  - 2019 Rugby World Cup
  - World Rugby Sevens Series

Licensed from DAZN

- Six Nations Championship (from 2020)
- NFL (2 Games each Sunday incl. Playoffs and Super Bowl shared with Pro7)

Licensed from Sky Sport

- WWE
  - WWE RAW
  - WWE SmackDown

== Availability ==
Logo of the HDTV-offshoot

- DVB-S: Digital via Astra 19,2° (12.545 MHz, transponder: 107, polarisation: horizontal, symbolrate: 22000 MS/s, FEC: 5/6)
- DVB-T: Available in the region around Munich
- DVB-C: e.g. in the networks of Kabel Deutschland, Unitymedia Kabel BW, Tele Columbus, Primacom, NetCologne
- IPTV: Telekom Entertain and Vodafone TV

In the IPTV network, Telekom Entertain, the channel has also been available in HDTV since 20 September 2013. On 15 October 2013 ProSiebenMaxx started HDTV broadcasting in the network of Unitymedia. The CEO René Carl announced the company's intention to start an HDTV channel on the HD+ platform. The channel is also available on analogue cable TV.

== Audience share ==
=== Germany ===
	January	February	March	April	May	June	July	August	September	October	November	December	Annual average
2013	-	-	-	-	-	-	-	-	-	0.4%	0.4%	0.4%	0.1%
2014	0.4%	0.5%	0.4%	0.6%	0.5%	0.5%	0.6%	0.5%	0.6%	0.6%	0.6%	0.6%	▲0.5%
2015	0.6%	0.6%	0.7%	0.7%	0.7%	0.7%	0.7%	0.6%	0.6%	0.6%	0.7%	0.8%	▲0.7%
2016	0.6%	0.5%	0.5%	0.5%	0.6%	0.6%	0.6%	0.5%	0.6%	0.5%	0.6%	0.6%	▼0.6%
2017	0.6%	0.6%	0.6%	0.6%	0.8%	0.7%	0.7%	0.8%	0.7%	0.8%	0.7%	0.7%	▲0.7%
2018	0.7%	0.6%	0.7%	0.8%	0.8%	0.7%	0.8%	-	-	-	-	-	
2019	0,8%	0,7%	0,7%	0,8%	0,8%	0,9%	0,8%	0,8%	0,8%	0,9%	0,8%	0,8%	0,8%
2020	0.7%	0.7%	0.7%	0,8%	0.7%	0.7%	0,8%	0.7%	0,8%	0,8%	0,8%	0.7%	▼0.7%
2021	0.7%	0.7%	0.7%	0,8%	0.7%	0.6%	0.7%	0,7%	0,8%	0,8%	0,8%	0,8%	▼0.7%
2022	0,8%	0,8%	0,8%	0,8%	0,8%	0,9%	0,8%	0,8%	0,8%	0,7%	0,7%		
