= Schmetterlinge im Bauch =

- Country of origin: Germany

Schmetterlinge im Bauch is a German television series.

== See also ==
- List of German television series
