= Sat.1 Gold =

- Logo used since 2019
- Country: Germany
- Broadcast area: Germany, Austria, and Switzerland
- Network: Sat.1
- Headquarters: Unterföhring, Germany

Programming
- Language: German
- Picture format: 1080i HDTV (downscaled to 16:9 576i for the SDTV feed)

Ownership
- Owner: ProSiebenSat.1 Media
- Sister channels: kabel eins kabel eins classics kabel eins Doku; ProSieben; ProSieben Fun; ProSieben Maxx; Sat.1; Sat.1 Emotions sixx

History
- Launched: 17 January 2013; 13 years ago

Links
- Website: www.sat1gold.de

Availability

Terrestrial
- Digital terrestrial television: Various; region dependent

Sat.1 Gold HD

Sat.1 Gold is a German free-to-air television channel aimed at women between 49 and 65. It is ProSiebenSat.1 Media's sixth channel in Germany. The channel manager is Marc Rasmus. Sat.1 Gold received a broadcast licence from the Kommission für Zulassung und Aufsicht der Medienanstalten (ZAK) (German: Commission for authorization and supervision of media institutions) on 20 November 2012. The channel is regulated by the Thüringische Landesmedienanstalt (TLM), based in the state of Thuringia. The channel started broadcasting on 17 January 2013 at 20:13 CET with a 2-minute countdown, followed by a promo and a puppet show. The channel then aired the German film The Whore.

== Programming ==
The channel mainly broadcasts German TV productions from the ProSiebenSat.1 archives. Sat.1 Gold will broadcast a spinoff of the magazine program Akte – Reporter kämpfen für Sie and Süddeutsche TV Thema. Also a daily midday magazine is planned to be broadcast. Programmes in the evening consists of documentaries, movies, thrillers and series.

The channel also shows tennis tournaments from ATP, WTA and ITF. A spinoff from the German sport show ran which is ran tennis started airing in April 2013.

== Audience share ==
=== Germany ===
| | January | February | March | April | May | June | July | August | September | October | November | December | Annual average |
|---|---|---|---|---|---|---|---|---|---|---|---|---|---|
| 2013 | 0.0% | 0.2% | 0.3% | 0.3% | 0.3% | 0.4% | 0.3% | 0.4% | 0.4% | 0.4% | 0.5% | 0.5% | 0.3% |
| 2014 | 0.5% | 0.5% | 0.6% | 0.7% | 0.7% | 0.7% | 0.7% | 0.8% | 0.9% | 0.9% | 0.9% | 0.9% | ▲0.7% |
| 2015 | 1.0% | 1.2% | 1.2% | 1.2% | 1.4% | 1.5% | 1.6% | 1.4% | 1.6% | 1.6% | 1.5% | 1.4% | ▲1.4% |
| 2016 | 1.3% | 1.5% | 1.5% | 1.5% | 1.5% | 1.4% | 1.5% | 1.5% | 1.4% | 1.4% | 1.2% | 1.4% | 1.4% |
| 2017 | 1.3% | 1.3% | 1.4% | 1.4% | 1.5% | 1.5% | 1.5% | 1.5% | 1.5% | 1.6% | 1.6% | 1.5% | ▲1.5% |
| 2018 | 1.5% | 1.5% | 1.6% | 1.7% | 1.8% | 1.6% | 1.7% | | | | | | |
