= Sixx =

German TV station

sixx
- Country: Germany
- Broadcast area: Germany, Austria, Switzerland
- Headquarters: Unterföhring, Germany

Programming
- Language: German
- Picture format: 1080i HDTV (downscaled to 16:9 576i for the SDTV feed)

Ownership
- Owner: ProSiebenSat.1 Media
- Key people: Ellen Koch
- Sister channels: Sat.1; ProSieben kabel eins Sat.1 Emotions; Sat.1 Gold; ProSieben Fun; ProSieben Maxx kabel eins classics kabel eins Doku

History
- Launched: 7 May 2010 (15 years ago)

Links
- Website: www.sixx.de

Availability

Terrestrial
- Digital terrestrial television: Various; region dependent

sixx is a German free-to-air television channel which targets a female audience. It was launched on 7 May 2010 at 8:15pm.

== History ==
In November 2009, ProSiebenSat.1 Media announced the new women's channel Fem-TV, whose name changed to Sixx at the beginning of February 2010. The name change was intended to establish Sixx as the sixth channel on the remote control, just like other channels do: Das Erste, ZDF, Das Vierte or ProSieben.

In an interview in August 2010 with the industry magazine Kontakter, the then station manager Hofem-Best said that 80 percent of the viewers were women and that the most popular series included Desperate Housewives, Grey's Anatomy and Damages. More in-house productions are currently planned, such as Galileo for women.

Since 2012, the station has also worked with commercial breaks, mostly between 6:00PM and 9:00PM.

In July 2013, the station received a new design and image concept. Animated chicken replaced the real white ones as testimonial.

== Programming ==
=== German ===
- Abenteuer Ferne
- Alles außer Sex
- Anna und die Liebe
- Besser Essen – leben leicht gemacht
- Bis in die Spitzen, German version of Cutting It (2010)
- Das Model und der Freak
- Eine wie keine
- Frank – der Weddingplaner
- Germany's Next Topmodel
- Hand aufs Herz
- Jugendcoach Oliver Lück
- Koffer zu und weg – Die Auswander-Doku
- Look of Love
- Schlüsselreiz
- sixx in concert
- Windeln und Wellness – Familienurlaub all inclusive
- Zacherl: Einfach kochen!

=== Foreign ===
- 90210
- Accidentally on Purpose (Aus Versehen glücklich) (2012-2013)
- Alias (Alias - Die Agentin)
- American Horror Story (2013-2014, 2016-2017)
- Brothers & Sisters
- Buffy the Vampire Slayer (Buffy – Im Bann der Dämonen) (2013-2017)
- Cagney & Lacey (2012)
- Charmed (Charmed – Zauberhafte Hexen)
- Cougar Town
- Damages (Damages – Im Netz der Macht)
- Desperate Housewives
- Devious Maids (Devious Maids - Schmutzige Geheimnisse) (2015–present)
- Diagnosis: Murder (Diagnose: Mord) (2012-2014)
- Drop Dead Diva
- Ed (Ed – Der Bowling-Anwalt)
- Eli Stone
- ER (Emergency Room – Die Notaufnahme)
- Emily Owens, M.D. (Emily Owens) (2013, 2017–present)
- Extant (2015-2016)
- Falcon Crest (2015)
- Friends
- Ghost Whisperer (Ghost Whisperer – Stimmen aus dem Jenseits)
- Gossip Girl
- Greek
- Grey's Anatomy
- Hart of Dixie (2013-2014, 2016–present)
- HawthoRNe
- Homicide Hunter (Homicide Hunter - Dem Mörder auf der Spur) (2016–present)
- Hope & Faith (2010)
- JAG (JAG – Im Auftrag der Ehre)
- Joan of Arcadia (Die himmlische Joan)
- Joey (2011)
- Kyle XY
- Less than Perfect (Office Girl)
- Life Is Wild
- Life Unexpected (2011-2013, 2017–present)
- Lipstick Jungle
- Mad Love
- Make It or Break It
- Melrose Place
- Medical Investigation
- Medium (Medium – Nichts bleibt verborgen)
- Miami Medical
- Missing (Missing – Verzweifelt gesucht)
- Moonlight (2011-2012, 2014-2015)
- Mr. Sunshine (2013)
- Necessary Roughness (Dr. Dani Santino – Spiel des Lebens)
- Nip/Tuck (Nip/Tuck – Schönheit hat ihren Preis)
- October Road
- One Born Every Minute (US) (One Born Every Minute - Die Babystation) (2014)
- One Tree Hill (2012-present)
- Pan Am (2013)
- Party of Five
- Polyamory: Married & Dating (Polyamorie - Liebe zu dritt) (2015-2016)
- Private Practice
- Privileged
- Pushing Daisies
- Rescue Me
- S1ngle (2011, 2013)
- Samantha Who?
- Scream Queens (2017)
- Second Time Around
- Sex and the City
- Sue Thomas: F.B.I.
- Surviving Evil (Surviving Evil - Im Angesicht des Bösen) (2015-2018)
- Summerland (Summerland Beach)
- That's Life (2010-2011, 2014, 2016)
- The 100 (2016)
- The Ellen Show (2011)
- The Game
- The Good Wife
- The Guardian (The Guardian - Retter mit Herz) (2014)
- The L Word (The L Word – Wenn Frauen Frauen lieben)
- The Magicians (2016-present)
- The O.C. (O.C., California)
- The Originals (2014-present)
- The Royals (2016-present)
- The Secret Life of the American Teenager
- The Tudors (2011, 2014-2016)
- Three Rivers Medical Center
- Ugly Betty
- Vampire Diaries
- What About Brian
- Weeds (Weeds - Kleine Deals unter Nachbarn) (2013)
- Will & Grace
- Witches of East End (2014-2016)
- You're the Worst (2015)

==== Entertainment ====
- Chopped Junior (Chopped Junior - Kleine Meisterköche) (2017-present)
- Flip or Flop (Top oder Flop? Die Super-Makler) (2015-present)
- Fixer Upper (Fixer Upper - Umbauen, einrichten, einziehen!) (2016-present)
- Snapped: Killer Couples (Killer Couples: Mörderische Paare) (2016-present)
- Wicked Attraction (Killer-Paare - Tödliches Verlangen) (2014–present)

== Audience share ==
=== Germany ===
	January	February	March	April	May	June	July	August	September	October	November	December	Annual average
2010	-	-	-	-	-	-	-	-	-	-	-	-	
2011	-	0.1%	0.1%	0.2%	0.2%	0.2%	0.2%	0.4%	0.4%	0.4%	0.4%	0.5%	0.3%
2012	0.5%	0.5%	0.5%	0.6%	0.6%	0.5%	0.6%	0.7%	0.7%	0.7%	0.7%	0.8%	▲0.6%
2013	0.6%	0.6%	0.6%	0.7%	0.7%	0.7%	0.7%	0.7%	0.7%	0.7%	0.7%	0.7%	0.6%
2014	0.7%	0.7%	0.7%	0.7%	0.7%	0.8%	0.7%	0.9%	0.7%	0.7%	0.8%	0.9%	▲0.7%
2015	0.7%	0.7%	0.8%	0.8%	0.7%	0.8%	0.8%	1.0%	0.9%	0.8%	0.8%	0.9%	▲0.8%
2016	0.7%	0.7%	0.8%	0.8%	0.8%	0.8%	0.8%	0.8%	1.0%	0.8%	0.7%	0.7%	0.8%
2017	0.7%	0.7%	0.7%	0.7%	0.8%	0.7%	0.7%	0.7%	0.7%	0.8%	0.7%	0.9%	▼0.7%
2018	0.8%	0.8%	0.8%	0.8%	0.9%	0.8%	0.8%						
