= Kabel eins =

Kabel Eins
- Country: Germany
- Broadcast area: Germany; Austria; Switzerland; Europe
- Headquarters: Unterföhring, Germany

Programming
- Language: German

Ownership
- Owner: ProSiebenSat.1 Media
- Sister channels: Sat.1; ProSieben; Sixx; Sat.1 Emotions; Sat.1 Gold; ProSieben Fun; ProSieben Maxx kabel eins classics kabel eins Doku

History
- Launched: 29 February 1992; 34 years ago
- Former names: Der Kabelkanal (1992-1994); Kabel 1 (1994-2009)

Links
- Website: kabeleins.de

Availability

Terrestrial
- Digital terrestrial television: Varies within location (HD)

Kabel Eins (German pronunciation: [ˌkaːbl̩ ˈˀaɪ̯ns]; meaning Cable One) is a German free-to-air television channel that was launched on 29 February 1992 as Der Kabelkanal (pronounced [deːɐ̯ ˈkaːbl̩.kaˌnaːl]). It is owned by ProSiebenSat.1 Media AG. It is largely known for airing classic American films as well as TV series and documentaries. It is considered to be a sister channel of ProSieben.

Kabel Eins has regularly taken over TV series from ProSieben when they were not successful enough or had already been broadcast several times. An example is Without a Trace, which was considered a failure on ProSieben but is quite successful on Kabel Eins. It also acquired several shows from RTL II. On May 4, 2016, ProSiebenSat.1 announced that the station kabel eins Doku would be launched as a spin-off of kabel eins in the second half of 2016. Thorsten Pütsch took over management of the station. The station focuses entirely on documentaries and reports and can be seen on free-to-air television.

== Programming ==
=== Imported series and shows ===
- 24 (2009–2016)
- 3rd Rock from the Sun
- ALF (2002–2011)
- Angel (2007–2011)
- Baywatch
- Booker (1995–1996)
- Buffy the Vampire Slayer (Buffy – Im Bann der Dämonen) (2006–2008)
- Cagney & Lacey (2000–2002)
- Castle
- Charmed (Charmed – Zauberhafte Hexen)
- Cold Case (Cold Case – Kein Opfer ist je vergessen)
- Criminal Minds: Suspect Behavior (Criminal Minds: Team Red) (2012)
- Damages (Damages – Im Netz der Macht)
- Dark Blue (2010, 2017)
- Diagnosis: Murder (Diagnose: Mord) (1996–2005, 2010)
- Eureka (EUReKA - Die geheime Stadt) (2013–2014, 2018–present)
- Everybody Loves Raymond (Alle lieben Raymond)
- Forever
- Frasier (1995–200?)
- Friends
- General Hospital (1992–1994)
- Ghost Whisperer (Ghost Whisperer – Stimmen aus dem Jenseits)
- Hey Dad...!
- Highway to Heaven (Ein Engel auf Erden) (1994–1995, 2001–2005, 2012–2014)
- Homeland (2015)
- Homicide Hunter (Homicide Hunter - Dem Mörder auf der Spur) (2015)
- Hotel (2004)
- Justice (Justice: Nicht schuldig!)
- Kojak (2006)
- Kung Fu: The Legend Continues (Kung Fu - Im Zeichen des Drachen) (1996–1997, 2004)
- Little House on the Prairie (Unsere kleine Farm)
- Lost
- Lucifer
- MacGyver
- Married... with Children (Eine schrecklich nette Familie)
- Matlock (1995, 2001–2004)
- Medical Investigation
- Medium (Medium – Nichts bleibt verborgen)
- Miami Vice (2006–2007)
- Murder, She Wrote (Mord ist ihr Hobby) (2009–2010, 2016–2017)
- My Wife and Kids (What's up, Dad?)
- NCIS (Navy CIS)
- NUMB3RS (Numb3rs - Die Logik des Verbrechens) (2009–2017)
- One Life to Live (Liebe, Lüge, Leidenschaft) (1992)
- Primeval (Primeval – Rückkehr der Urzeitmonster)
- Quincy, M.E (Quincy)
- Roseanne (1992–1993, 2002, 2004, 2006–2009)
- Rules of Engagement
- Scorpion (2017–present)
- Seinfeld (1995–1996, 2005–2006)
- Stalker (2018)
- T. J. Hooker (1994–2001)
- That '70s Show (Die wilden Siebziger)
- The Cosby Show (Bill Cosby Show)
- The Forgotten (2010)
- The Good Wife (Good Wife)
- The King of Queens
- The Pacific (2010, 2013, 2018)
- The Practice
- The Shield (The Shield - Gesetz der Gewalt) (2007, 2012–2017)
- The X-Files
- Three's Company (Herzbube mit 2 Damen) (1992, 1996–1997)
- Top Gear
- Two and a Half Men (2009–2012)
- V (V - Die außerirdischen Besucher kommen) (1995–1998)
- Wisdom of the Crowd (2018)
- Without a Trace (Without a Trace – Spurlos verschwunden) (2004–present)
- Zorro (Zorro - Der schwarze Rächer) (1996–1998)

=== Imported animation ===
- Sonic X (2004–2011)
- Star Wars: The Clone Wars (2010–2012)
- The Bugs Bunny Show (2000–2008?)

=== Local ===
- Abenteuer Alltag (Adventures Everyday)
- Abenteuer Alltag - Jetzt bauen wir (Adventures Everyday - Now We Are Building)
- Abenteuer Auto (Car Adventures)
- Abenteuer Leben - Täglich Wissen (Adventures of Life - Daily Knowledge)
- Darf man das (Quiz)
- Der Comedyflüsterer (The Comedy Whisperer)
- Männer allein daheim (Men Alone at Home)
- Mein neuer Job (My New Job)
- Mein neues Leben (My New Life)
- Mein neues Leben XXL (My New Life XXL)
- Mein schlimmster Tag
- :newstime
- :newstime Spätnachrichten
- Wir sind viele

=== Former programming blocks ===
- Cartoon Network (Saturday mornings)
- Disney Time (Sunday mornings)
- Jetix (Sunday mornings)

== Audience share ==
=== Germany ===
	January	February	March	April	May	June	July	August	September	October	November	December	Annual average
1992	-	-	-	-	-	-	-	-	-	-	-	-	-
1993	-	-	-	-	-	-	-	-	-	-	-	-	1.6%
1994	-	-	-	-	-	-	-	-	-	-	-	-	▲2.0%
1995	-	-	-	-	-	-	-	-	-	-	-	-	▲3.0%
1996	3.2%	3.4%	3.5%	3.5%	3.6%	3.2%	3.7%	3.7%	3.5%	3.5%	3.7%	4.1%	▲3.6%
1997	4.0%	3.9%	3.8%	3.9%	4.0%	3.9%	3.5%	3.5%	3.8%	4.0%	4.0%	3.7%	▲3.8%
1998	3.8%	3.7%	4.0%	4.4%	4.6%	4.1%	4.4%	4.6%	4.7%	4.7%	4.8%	4.7%	▲4.4%
1999	4.6%	5.2%	5.4%	5.4%	5.3%	5.4%	5.3%	5.3%	5.8%	5.9%	6.0%	5.5%	▲5.4%
2000	5.7%	5.6%	5.6%	5.7%	5.6%	5.3%	5.2%	5.4%	5.2%	5.8%	5.7%	5.4%	▲5.5%
2001	5.7%	5.6%	5.4%	5.4%	5.3%	5.2%	4.7%	4.8%	4.6%	4.7%	4.6%	4.4%	▼5.0%
2002	4.6%	4.2%	4.7%	4.6%	4.6%	4.1%	4.6%	4.3%	4.6%	4.6%	4.7%	4.1%	▼4.5%
2003	4.3%	4.1%	4.2%	4.5%	4.4%	4.2%	4.0%	3.9%	4.1%	4.5%	4.1%	4.0%	▼4.2%
2004	4.3%	3.9%	4.2%	4.5%	4.4%	3.7%	4.0%	3.6%	4.1%	4.0%	3.9%	3.8%	▼4.0%
2005	3.8%	3.8%	4.0%	3.7%	4.0%	3.9%	4.0%	3.8%	3.9%	3.8%	3.7%	3.6%	▼3.8%
2006	3.8%	3.5%	3.7%	3.8%	3.8%	3.0%	3.3%	3.6%	3.6%	3.7%	3.4%	3.6%	▼3.6%
2007	3.3%	3.4%	3.7%	3.8%	3.8%	3.6%	3.7%	3.5%	3.6%	3.6%	3.5%	3.5%	3.6%
2008	3.4%	3.3%	3.6%	3.4%	3.7%	3.2%	3.8%	3.6%	3.8%	3.9%	3.7%	3.6%	3.6%
2009	3.6%	3.7%	3.6%	3.7%	4.0%	4.3%	4.2%	4.2%	3.9%	3.9%	3.8%	3.9%	▲3.9%
2010	3.8%	3.8%	3.9%	3.9%	3.9%	3.3%	4.1%	4.6%	4.1%	3.9%	3.7%	4.1%	3.9%
2011	3.9%	3.6%	3.7%	3.8%	3.8%	4.3%	3.9%	4.1%	4.3%	4.4%	4.0%	3.9%	▲4.0%
2012	3.7%	4.0%	4.1%	4.2%	3.8%	3.5%	3.9%	3.9%	3.9%	4.0%	4.0%	4.0%	▼3.9%
2013	3.8%	3.9%	4.0%	3.9%	4.1%	4.1%	4.0%	4.2%	3.8%	4.0%	3.9%	3.8%	▲4.0%
2014	3.7%	3.7%	3.9%	3.8%	4.0%	3.4%	3.6%	4.0%	3.9%	3.8%	3.8%	3.5%	▼3.8%
2015	3.5%	3.6%	3.6%	4.1%	3.9%	4.2%	4.0%	3.9%	3.8%	3.7%	3.7%	3.9%	3.8%
2016	3.4%	3.7%	4.1%	3.8%	4.0%	3.6%	3.8%	3.6%	3.8%	3.9%	3.7%	3.7%	3.8%
2017	3.5%	3.4%	3.4%	3.5%	3.4%	3.6%	3.5%	3.3%	3.5%	3.6%	3.3%	3.5%	▼3.4%
2018	3.3%	3.2%	3.4%	3.5%	3.8%	3.1%	3.2%						

The average age of the viewers is 48.4 years (as of 2016).
