= Magine =

Cloud-based TV platform

Magine TV was a cloud-based TV platform that allowed broadcasters to deliver live and time-shifted content to users, as well as catch-up and on demand programming, across all devices, including tablets, phones, Smart TVs and computers. The service did not require any set top boxes, cards, or start-up or installation fees. Magine TV worked with broadcasters and premium content providers to provide free to air and Pay TV to a variety of devices.

== History ==
The business launched commercially in March 2013 in its native Sweden, and in Germany in April 2014, hosting some of the world's best known brands and channels, including Disney, Discovery, CNN International, BBC, Eurosport, National Geographic, Nickelodeon and the Cartoon Network, as well as local networks.

A Beta version was rolled out in Spain (July 2013) with broadcasters relevant to the territory, and a commercial launch set to follow. In July 2013, Magine closed a $19 million Series A funding round with a group of undisclosed Swedish and international investors.

In October 2013, Magine TV announced an agreement with leading international TV manufacturers: LG Electronics, Panasonic, and TP Vision (for Philips TV). The Magine app would be available on all Smart TVs produced by these manufacturers in key European territories from early 2014. In the same month, Magine was listed as one of Stockholm's hottest start-ups in WIRED Magazine.

On January 28, 2019, Magine TV terminated its streaming services to focus on business-to-business strategies, such as MaginePro. The business-to-consumer streaming platform was sold to Zattoo.
