= Unterföhring =

- Municipality
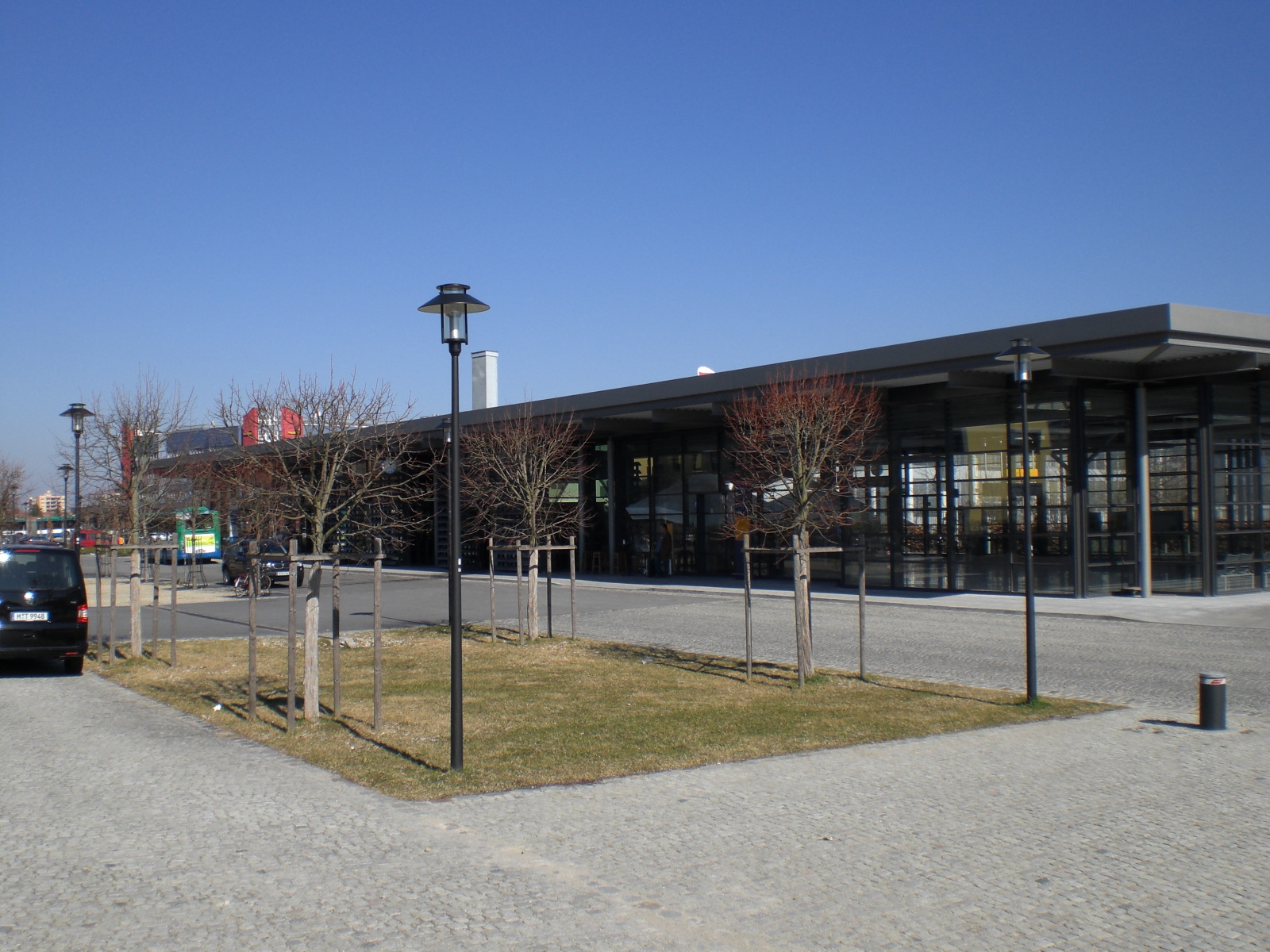
- Train station

- Coat of arms

- Location of Unterföhring within Munich district
- Interactive map of Unterföhring
- Location within Germany Location within Bavaria
- Coordinates: 48°12′N 11°39′E
- Country: Germany
- State: Bavaria
- Admin. region: Oberbayern
- District: Munich

Government
  - Mayor (2020–26): Andreas Kemmelmeyer

Area
  - Total: 12.79 km^{2} (4.94 sq mi)
- Elevation: 508 m (1,667 ft)

Population (2025-12-31)
  - Total: 11,729
  - Density: 917.0/km^{2} (2,375/sq mi)
- Time zone: UTC+01:00 (CET)
  - Summer (DST): UTC+02:00 (CEST)
- Postal codes: 85774
- Dialling codes: 089
- Vehicle registration: M, MUC
- Website: www.unterfoehring.de

Unterföhring (German pronunciation: [ʊntɐˈføːʁɪŋ], lit. 'Lower Föhring', in contrast to "Upper Föhring") is a municipality in Upper Bavaria. It lies adjacent to the northeast side of Munich, and is one of the nearest suburbs to Munich's central district.

== History ==
Before the establishment of Munich around 1158, an important crossing existed over the river Isar, the Föhringer Brücke. Unterföhring was mentioned in documents for the first time in 1180 as an independent place (inferius Feringin). Unterföhring was part of the Prince-Bishopric of Freising. Since the Reichsdeputationshauptschluss of 1803 the place belongs to Bavaria. In the course of the administrative reforms in Bavaria the today's municipality was created with the municipality edict of 1818.

== Economy ==
Unterföhring is one of the most important media centers of Germany. The 1950s saw the settlement of the RIVA photometric companies. In 1962 the Bavarian broadcaster (BR) and ZDF took over RIVA Studios. In 1972, Taurus films, the later Kirch Group, was founded. Since 2000, ProSiebenSat.1 Media AG is also based here. In addition, Sky Deutschland and Vodafone Deutschland, the largest cable operators in Germany, have their headquarters in the city. One of the largest independent film production companies in Germany, the Neue Deutsche Filmgesellschaft, has their head offices here. Unterföhring is also the location of MX1 (previously SES Platform Services, now part of SES Video) which provides signal processing and distribution for television and radio stations, and broadcast data services.

Besides media enterprises, major insurance companies are situated east of the rapid-transit railway line S8 in the trade area of Unterföhring. The largest employer is Allianz SE with approximately 6,000 workers. Another employer is the AGIS Allianz Dresdner Information Systems GmbH, an IT service provider and subsidiary of Allianz SE, with a large computing center. Other subsidiaries of the Allianz company are also located in Unterföhring. Also in the vicinity is Swiss Re Life, Unicredit and Health Germany, part of the Swiss Re family of companies, with approximately 600 employees. Owing to the many corporate enterprises, the municipality is free from debt and even has accumulated a large reserve.

== Sports ==
Unterföhring is the smallest community in Germany with an own Rugby union club. The RC Unterföhring e.V. was founded in 2012 and already fields two XVs in the 2nd Bundesliga and in the Verbandsliga Bayern. After its promotion to the 2nd Bundesliga in 2017 it became the first club in German rugby history to ever come from a village and play in Rugby-Bundesliga. Paying foreign players has helped keeping the team in the 2nd Bundesliga.
