= List of television stations in Germany =

As one of the largest industrial nations and with the largest population in the European Union, Germany today offers a vast diversity of television stations.

== Public channels ==
=== ARD ===
ARD, consortium of German public broadcasting services, consisting of the following public stations (which also provide regional programming in separate channels):

- Das Erste (The First) (ARD)
  - ARD-alpha — German education channel, with TV courses
  - One
  - tagesschau24
- Bayerischer Rundfunk (BR)
  - BR Fernsehen
- Hessischer Rundfunk (HR)
  - hr-fernsehen
- Mitteldeutscher Rundfunk (MDR)
  - MDR Fernsehen
- Norddeutscher Rundfunk (NDR)
  - NDR Fernsehen
- Radio Bremen (RB)
  - Radio Bremen TV
- Rundfunk Berlin-Brandenburg (RBB; established on 1 May 2003 from a merger of the former Sender Freies Berlin and Ostdeutscher Rundfunk Brandenburg)
  - RBB Fernsehen
- Saarländischer Rundfunk (SR)
  - SR Fernsehen
- Südwestrundfunk (SWR; established on 1 October 1998 from a merger of the former Südwestfunk and Süddeutscher Rundfunk)
  - SWR Fernsehen
- Westdeutscher Rundfunk (WDR)
  - WDR Fernsehen

=== ZDF ===
- ZDF (Zweites Deutsches Fernsehen, "Second German Television"):
  - ZDFneo
  - ZDFinfo

=== ARD & ZDF ===
- KiKA Der Kinderkanal — public, non-commercial children's TV, with support of ARD and ZDF
- Arte — public Franco-German culture channel from ARD, ZDF and France Télévisions
- 3sat — cultural network from the ARD, ZDF, ORF (Austrian Broadcasting), and SRG (Swiss Broadcasting).
- Phoenix — public - with information, documentaries, news, jointly operated by ARD and ZDF

=== DFF (defunct) ===
- Deutscher Fernsehfunk or "Fernsehen der DDR" operated the two (now defunct) television networks of East Germany

== Private channels (Free-TV) ==
=== RTL Deutschland ===
- RTL
- VOX
- RTL Zwei
- RTLup
- Nitro
- Super RTL
- n-tv
- Toggo Plus
- VOXup

=== ProSiebenSat.1 Media ===
- Sat.1
- ProSieben
- kabel eins
- sixx
- Sat.1 Gold
- ProSieben Maxx
- kabel eins Doku

=== Skydance Europe & Africa ===
- Comedy Central
- DMAX
- Eurosport 1
- HGTV
- MTV
- Nickelodeon
- Tele 5
- TLC

=== WeltN24 ===
- Welt
- N24 Doku

=== High View Group ===
- Crime Time
- Deluxe Music
- Deluxe Dance by Kontor
- Deluxe Lounge
- Deluxe Rap
- Höhenrausch
- Just Cooking
- Just Fishing
- OneTerra
- Serien+
- Schlager Deluxe
- Xplore

=== Berliner Fernseh Gruppe ===
- DMF (DE)
- Dokusat (DE)
- Lilo TV (DE)
- TeleGold
- Volksmusik TV (DE)

=== QVC Deutschland ===
- QVC
- QVC Zwei
- QVC Style

=== HSE ===
- HSE (DE)
- HSE Extra
- HSE Trend

=== Others ===
- 123tv (DE)
- Anixe+ (DE)
- Anixe HD Serie
- Aristo TV
- Bibel TV
- DF1 (DE)
- Euronews
- GeniusPlus TV
- Health TV (DE)
- Juwelo (DE)
- Pearl TV (DE)
- RiC (DE)
- Spirit TV (DE)
- SPORT1
- XITE

== Pay television channels ==
=== Sky ===
- Sky Atlantic
- Sky Cinema Premiere
- Sky Cinema Action
- Sky Cinema Blockbuster
- Sky Cinema Classics
- Sky Cinema Feelgood
- Sky Cinema Special
- Sky Crime
- Sky Documentaries
- Sky Krimi
- Sky Nature
- Sky One
- Sky Sci-Fi
- Sky Showcase
- Sky Sport News
- Sky Sport Top Event
- Sky Sport Bundesliga 1 - 10
- Sky Sport Premier League
- Sky Sport F1
- Sky Sport NFL
- Sky Sport Tennis
- Sky Sport Golf
- Sky Sport Mix
- Sky Sport UHD
- Sky Sport Bundesliga UHD
- Sky Sport 1 - 11

=== RTL Deutschland ===
- RTL Crime
- RTL Passion
- RTL Living
- GEO Television

=== ProSiebenSat.1 Media ===
- Sat.1 emotions
- ProSieben Fun
- kabel eins classics

=== Mainstream Media ===
- Heimatkanal (DE)
- Romance TV (DE)
- Goldstar (DE)

=== Skydance Europe & Africa ===
- Animal Planet
- Discovery Channel
- Eurosport 2
- Eurosport 2 Xtra
- Cartoonito
- Cartoon Network
- Nicktoons
- Nick Jr.
- WarnerTV Comedy
- WarnerTV Film
- WarnerTV Serie

=== NBCUniversal ===
- 13th Street
- Universal TV

=== High View Group ===
- AXN Black
- AXN White
- Gute Laune TV (DE)

=== A&E Networks ===
- Crime + Investigation (DE)
- History

=== DAZN Group ===
- DAZN 1
- DAZN 2

=== Sportainment Media Group ===
- eSports One (DE)
- Sportdigital1+ (DE)
- Sportdigital EDGE
- Sportdigital Fussball
- Sportdigital Fussball 2

=== Others ===
- Auto Motor und Sport Channel (DE)
- Beate-Uhse.TV
- Bergblick (DE)
- BonGusto (DE)
- Curiosity Channel (DE)
- Extreme Sports Channel
- Fix & Foxi
- Jukebox TV (DE)
- Kinowelt TV
- Lust Pur (DE)
- Marco Polo TV
- Motorvision+ (DE)
- National Geographic Channel
- National Geographic Wild
- Silverline Movie Channel
- Spiegel Geschichte (DE)
- Stingray Classica

== Regional channels ==
- Baden TV
- HD Campus TV
- filstalwelle
- KraichgauTV
- L-TV
- Regio TV Bodensee
- Regio TV Schwaben
- Regio TV Stuttgart
- Rhein-Neckar Fernsehen
- RTF.1 (DE)
- augsburg.tv
- Niederbayern TV Deggendorf-Straubing
- Franken Fernsehen
- Herzo.TV
- intv
- Niederbayern TV Landshut
- ITV Coburg + ITV info
- Kulmbach TV
- münchen.tv
- münchen2
- Oberpfalz TV
- Regionalfernsehen Oberbayern
- Niederbayern TV Passau
- allgäu.tv
- TV Oberfranken
- TV Mainfranken (tvm)
- TVA - TVAktuell
- Alex Offener Kanal Berlin (Wedding)
- Spreekanal
- BFtv
- Elbe-Elster-Fernsehen
- jüterbog-tv:
- KW-TV
- Lausitz TV
- luck-tv:
- Neiße Welle Guben (NWG)
- Oderland.TV
- Oder-Spree Fernsehen (OSF)
- Fernsehen für Ostbrandenburg (ODF)
- OHV TV
- PotsdamTV
- Usedom TV
- rangsdorf-tv:
- sabinchen-tv:
- SKB Stadtfernsehen Brandenburg
- Strausberg TV
- teltOwkanal
- tv-lu
- WMZ TV
- Radio Weser.TV
- Hamburg 1
- Tide (Bürger- und Ausbildungskanal)Tide TV
- noa4
- Offener Kanal Fulda
- Offener Kanal Gießen
- Offener Kanal Kassel
- Offener Kanal Offenbach/Frankfurt
- OF-TV
- rheinmaintv
- Rok-tv - FiSCH - TV Fernsehen in Schwerin
- Greifswald-TV
- Grevesmühlen-TV
- MV1
- neu'eins
- rok-tv
- Rügen TV & Stralsund TV
- tv.rostock
- TV-Schwerin
- Vorpommern TV
- Wismar TV
- Ems TV
- Friesischer Rundfunk
- H1 (Fernsehen)
- oldenburg eins
- os1.tv
- Radio Weser.TV
- regiotv
- TV38
- CityVision
- nrwision
- Studio 47
- :OKTV Südwestpfalz
- naheTV
- Offener Kanal Kirchheimbolanden
- RheinLokal
- OK Weinstraße
- OK-KL
- OK:TV Mainz
- OK54 Bürgerrundfunk
- OK-TV Ludwigshafen
- OK4
- rheinahr.tv
- Rhein-Neckar Fernsehen
- TV Mittelrhein
- wwtv
- Coswiger Infokanal K3
- Dresden Fernsehen
- Dresdeneins
- eff 3
- Elsterwelle
- eRtv - euro-Regional tv
- Infokanal Crimmitschau
- Kabeljournal Flöha
- KabelJournal Chemnitzer-Land
- kanal 8 dresden
- kanal 8 sport
- Kanal 9 Erzgebirge
- Kanal Eins
- Leipzig Fernsehen
- Mittel Erzgebirgs Fernsehen
- Mittelsachsen TV
- mwdigital
- Nordsachsen TV
- Pirna TV/Prohlis TV
- punkteins oberlausitz TV
- Regio TV Borna
- Riesa TV
- Sachsen Fernsehen
- TV Westsachsen (TV W)
- Torgau TV
- TV Zwönitztal/tele-Journal
- TV-Laußig
- tvM Meissen Fernsehen
- Vogtland Regional Fernsehen (VRF)
- kulturmdTV
- MDF.1
- Offener Kanal Magdeburg
- Offener Kanal Merseburg-Querfurt
- Offener Kanal Wettin
- punktum
- RAN1
- Regionalfernsehen Bitterfeld-Wolfen (RBW Regionalfernsehen)
- Regionalfernsehen Harz (RFH)
- TV Halle
- Kiel TV
- Offener Kanal Flensburg
- Bad Berka TV
- JenaTV
- Kabel Plus
- Rennsteig.TV
- Saale-Info-Kanal
- salve.tv
- Stadtkanal Steinach
- Südthüringer Regionalfernsehen (SRF)
- Telemedien Rudolstadt
- tv.altenburg

== Defunct television channels ==
- 9Live
- A&E
- ARD 1 Plus
- ARD 2
- Bahn TV
- Bild TV
- Blue Movie
- center.tv
- Channel 21
- Das Vierte
- Deluxe Flashback
- Deluxe Rock
- Deutscher Fernsehfunk
- Discovery Geschichte
- Disney Cinemagic
- Disney Channel
- Disney Jr.
- Disney XD
- DSF Action
- DSF Golf
- DSF Plus
- Düzgün TV
- E!
- EinsPlus
- Eo TV
- Fernsehen aus Berlin
- Fernsehsender Paul Nipkow
- Flux TV
- Focus Gesundheit
- Fox Channel
- Gems TV
- GIGA Television
- Hip Trips
- Hit24
- Junior
- K1010
- MTV2 Pop
- MTV Music
- MTV Brand New
- Musicbox
- NBC Europe
- Onyx.tv
- Premiere Serie
- ProSiebenSat.1 Welt
- RBB Berlin
- RBB Brandenburg
- RT DE
- RTL International
- Servus TV (Germany)
- Sky 3D
- Sky Arts
- Sky Cinema Fun
- Sky Cinema Thriller
- Sky Comedy
- Sky Information
- Sky Replay
- Sky Select
- Sky Sport Fanzone
- Terranova
- TIMM
- TM3
- Toon Disney
- Traumpartner TV
- Travel Channel
- VH-1 Deutschland
- VIVA
- VIVA Plus
- VIVA Zwei
- XXP
- ZDF 2
- ZDFdokukanal
- ZDFkultur
- ZDF Musikkanal
- ZDFtheaterkanal
- Zee One

== See also ==
- Television in Germany
- Media of Germany
