= Sky Switzerland =

Swiss pay-TV provider

Sky Switzerland SA
- Formerly: Homedia (2003–2008)
- Type: Subsidiary
- Founded: 17 November 2003; 22 years ago
- Founders: Renzo del Mastro; Sébastien D'Amico
- Headquarters: Neuchâtel, Switzerland
- Key people: Éric Grignon (CEO)
- Services: Pay TV (Streaming television)
- Parent: Sky Deutschland (RTL Group)
- Website: www.sky.ch

Sky Switzerland is a Swiss media company based in Neuchâtel, which supplies over-the-top pay television and video on demand accessible through the Internet in Switzerland.

== History ==
Homedia was founded in 2003 by Renzo del Mastro and Sébastien D'Amico, which offered DVD rental services, was later expanded from a DVD rental into the biggest independent OTT VOD platform in Switzerland with their video-on-demand service HollyStar. In May 2017, Sky Deutschland purchased Swiss online-video service HollyStar and its owner Homedia with Homedia being rebranded as Sky Switzerland on 3 January 2018. Before the takeover, Teleclub had the broadcast rights for certain Sky content in Switzerland with some of that content being seen on channels from Swisscom TV, Sunrise TV and UPC TV. Now as Sky Switzerland, it subsequently launched Sky Sport as an OTT service in Switzerland, followed by an OTT entertainment service known as Sky Show in 2018.

== Channels ==
=== Sky Sport ===
Sky Sport logo

In August 2017, Sky Deutschland announced it would launch Sky Sport in Switzerland as an OTT provider on 17 August 2017. Sky Sport channels are also available via Liberty Global-owned UPC Switzerland, previously only available on Swisscom-owned provider Teleclub.

On 18 September 2018, it was announced that Sky Switzerland would enter a partnership with UPC Switzerland-owned Mysports, which owns the rights to a number of domestic competitions including the ice hockey National League. Via an additional subscription, all MySports channels can be streamed on Sky Switzerland.

Sky Sport had over 400,000 viewers aged 15 and over in Switzerland in 2023 (5.9% of the population). In German-speaking Switzerland, the number of users was around 4% higher than in French-speaking Switzerland.

=== Sky Show ===
Sky Show logo

In March 2018, the provider launched Sky Show as a Netflix competitor, featuring dubbed and original language versions of popular Sky programming on its German-language platform for a monthly subscription. Sky Show is not listed on its French and Italian-language platform.

In January 2024, the offering included around 1,000 film and series titles with over 10,000 episodes. It differs from Sky Deutschland's offering of around 1,600 film or series titles. The Sky catalog includes titles from HBO, Sky Originals, Paramount, Warner Bros, Universal and Sony.

==== Channels ====
In addition to individual programmes, streams of the following channels are also available:

Channel Name	Programming	Owner	Broadcast Time	Package	Format
Sky 1 HDe service comes preloaded on Sky Q and Sky+HD boxes, and is also available	General entertainment channel	Sky Deutschland	24/7	Sky Show	1080i HDTV
Sky Atlantic HD	Programmes from Home Box Office (HBO)	Sky Deutschland	24/7	Sky Show	1080i HDTV
13th Street	Crime and thriller series, films and short films	Sky Deutschland	24/7	Sky Show	1080i HDTV
Sky Sci-Fi	Science fiction, fantasy and horror shows and movies	Sky Deutschland	24/7	Sky Show	1080i HDTV

=== Sky Store ===
Sky Store logo

On 3 December 2018, Sky's video-on-demand service Sky Store launched in Switzerland. Unlike Sky Show, which is a subscription service, you can purchase individual series or episodes on Sky Store.
