= 1996 in German television =

This is a list of German television related events from 1996.

== Events ==
- 1 March - Leon is selected to represent Germany at the 1996 Eurovision Song Contest with his song "Planet of Blue". He is selected to be the forty-first German Eurovision entry during Ein bisschen Glück held at the Friedrich-Ebert-Halle in Hamburg.
- 31 March - The first season of Soundmix Show was won by Bianca Shomburg performing as Celine Dion.

== Debuts ==
=== Free for air ===
==== Domestic ====
- 1 January - The Shadow Man (1996) (ZDF)
- 14 January - Der Bulle von Tölz (1996–2009) (Sat.1)
- 12 March - Alarm für Cobra 11 – Die Autobahnpolizei (1996–present) (RTL)
- 20 April - Die Wochenshow (1996–2002) (Sat.1)

==== International ====
- 14 June - (United Kingdom) Keeping Up Appearances (1990–1995) (ZDF)
- 17 August - (United States) Friends (1994–2004) (Sat. 1)
- 8 September - (United States) Barney & Friends (1992–2010) (Super RTL)
- (United States) / (France) DragonFlyz (1996–1997) (ProSieben)
- (United States) Caroline in the City (1995–1999) (Unknown)
- (United States) Wacky Races (1968–1969) (ProSieben)

=== Cable ===
==== International ====
- November - (United States) The Ren & Stimpy Show (1991-1996) (Nickelodeon)

=== American Forces Network ===
- (United States) The Lion King's Timon & Pumbaa (1995-1999)

=== BFBS ===
- 18 January - (United Kingdom) The Thin Blue Line (1995-1996)
- 21 January - (United Kingdom) The Beatles Anthology (1995)
- 22 January - (United Kingdom) Black Hearts in Battersea (1995-1996)
- 31 January - (United Kingdom) The Demon Headmaster (1996-1998)
- 2 February - (United Kingdom) Pride and Prejudice (1995)
- 17 April - (United Kingdom) / (Australia) The Genie From Down Under (1996-1998)
- 13 June - (United Kingdom) Dennis the Menace (1996-1998)
- 17 June - (United Kingdom) Agent Z and the Penguin from Mars (1996)
- 17 June - (United Kingdom) Madson (1996)
- 23 July - (United Kingdom) Bimble's Bucket (1996-1998)
- 26 July - (United Kingdom) The Big Bang (1996-2004)
- 21 October - (United Kingdom) / (France) Romuald the Reindeer (1996)

== Television shows ==
=== 1950s ===
- Tagesschau (1952–present)

=== 1960s ===
- heute (1963-present)

=== 1970s ===
- heute-journal (1978-present)
- Tagesthemen (1978-present)

=== 1980s ===
- Wetten, dass..? (1981-2014)
- Lindenstraße (1985–present)

=== 1990s ===
- Gute Zeiten, schlechte Zeiten (1992–present)
- Marienhof (1992–2011)
- Unter uns (1994-present)
- Verbotene Liebe (1995-2015)
- Gottschalks Hausparty (1995-1997)
- Soundmix Show (1995-1997)

== Ending this year ==
- Gottschalks Hausparty (1995–1997)
- Soundmix Show (1995–1997)

== Networks and services ==
=== Launches ===
Network	Type	Launch date	Notes	Source
DSF Action	Cable television	Unknown		
DSF Golf	Cable television	Unknown		
DSF Plus	Cable television	Unknown		
Cine Action	Cable television	Unknown		
Cine Comedy	Cable television	Unknown		
Romantic Movies	Cable television	Unknown		
Star*Kino	Cable television	Unknown		
Western Movies	Cable television	Unknown		
Onyx.tv	Cable television	6 January		
Dresden Fernsehen	Cable television	10 June		
Herz&Co	Cable television	28 July		
Junior	Cable television	28 July		
Krimi & Co	Cable television	28 July		
Discovery Channel	Cable television	27 August		
QVC Germany	Cable television	1 December		

== Births ==
- 17 September – Mike Singer, German pop singer and television personality

== Deaths ==
Date	Name	Age	Cinematic Credibility
1 May	Hilde Nocker	71	German TV host

== See also ==
- 1996 in Germany
