= 2002 in German television =

This is a list of German television related events from 2002.

== Events ==
- 18 January - Rudi Cerne debuts as the new presenter for Aktenzeichen XY... ungelöst.
- 22 February - Corinna May is selected to represent Germany at the 2002 Eurovision Song Contest with her song "I Can't Live Without Music". She is selected to be the forty-seventh German Eurovision entry during Countdown Grand Prix held at the Ostseehalle in Kiel.
- 9 November - The German version of Pop Idol debuts on RTL.

== Debuts ==
=== Domestic ===
- 2 January - Die Affäre Semmeling (2002) (ZDF)
- 8 January - Um Himmels Willen (2002–present) (ARD)
- 9 January - Die Rosenheim-Cops (2002–present) (ZDF)
- 5 March - Berlin, Berlin (2002–2005) (ARD)
- 2 August - Unter Verdacht (2002–2019) (Arte)
- 9 November - Deutschland sucht den Superstar (2002–present) (RTL)

=== International ===
- 6 July - (United States) / (Canada) Dragon Tales (1999–2005) (Sat 1)
- 1 August - (United States) Underdog (1964–1973) (K-Toon)
- 17 August - (United States) Family Guy (1999-2003, 2005–present) (ProSieben)

== Military Television Debuts ==
=== BFBS ===
- 5 April - (United Kingdom) Merlin the Magical Puppy (2001–2002)
- 15 April - (Japan) Strange Dawn (2000)
- 16 April - (United Kingdom) Ripley and Scuff (2002–2003)
- 20 May - (United Kingdom) Shackleton (2002)
- (United Kingdom) Engie Benjy (2002–2004)
- (United Kingdom) Andy Pandy (1950-1970, 2002–2005)
- (United Kingdom) / (Canada) Don't Eat the Neighbours (2001–2002)
- (United Kingdom) Sir Gadabout: The Worst Knight in the Land (2002–2003)
- (United Kingdom) Mr. Bean: The Animated Series (2002-2004, 2015–present)
- (United Kingdom) Rescue Me (2002)
- (United States) / (United Kingdom) Clifford the Big Red Dog (2000–2003)
- (United Kingdom) Fimbles (2002–2004)

== Television shows ==
=== 1950s ===
- Tagesschau (1952–present)

=== 1960s ===
- heute (1963–present)

=== 1970s ===
- heute-journal (1978–present)
- Tagesthemen (1978–present)

=== 1980s ===
- Wetten, dass..? (1981-2014)
- Lindenstraße (1985–present)

=== 1990s ===
- Gute Zeiten, schlechte Zeiten (1992–present)
- Marienhof (1992–2011)
- Unter uns (1994–present)
- Verbotene Liebe (1995-2015)
- Schloss Einstein (1998–present)
- In aller Freundschaft (1998–present)
- Wer wird Millionär? (1999–present)

=== 2000s ===
- Big Brother Germany (2000-2011, 2015–present)

== Networks and services ==
=== Launches ===
| Network | Type | Launch date | Notes | Source |
|---|---|---|---|---|
| Premiere 4 | Cable television | Unknown | | |
| Premiere 5 | Cable television | Unknown | | |
| Premiere 6 | Cable television | Unknown | | |
| Premiere 7 | Cable television | Unknown | | |
| Bibel TV | Cable television | 1 October | | |
| E! | Cable television | 2 December | | |

=== Conversions and rebrandings ===
| Old network name | New network name | Type | Conversion Date | Notes | Source |
|---|---|---|---|---|---|
| Viva Zwei | VIVA Plus | Cable television | 7 January | | |
| Sunset | Premiere Serie | Cable television | May | | |
| Krimi & Co | Premiere Krimi | Cable television | May | | |

=== Closures ===
| Network | Type | End date | Notes | Sources |
|---|---|---|---|---|
| Premiere Action-X | Cable television | Unknown | | |

== See also ==
- 2002 in Germany
