= 2010 in German television =

This is a list of German television related events from 2010.

== Events ==
- 12 March – Lena is selected to represent Germany at the 2010 Eurovision Song Contest with her song "Satellite". She is selected to be the fifty-fifth German Eurovision entry during Unser Star für Oslo held at the Brainpool Studios in Cologne.
- 17 April – Mehrzad Marashi wins the seventh season of Deutschland sucht den Superstar.
- 28 May – Commissario Laurenti actress Sophia Thomalla and her partner Massimo Sinato win the third season of Let's Dance.
- 29 May – Germany wins the 55th Eurovision Song Contest in Oslo, Norway. The winning song is "Satellite" performed by Lena.
- 9 August – Timo Grätsch wins the tenth season of Big Brother Germany.
- 20 August – Launch of the German version of The X Factor.
- 9 November – Edita Abdieski wins the first season of X Factor.
- 18 December – 56-year-old classical singer Freddy Sahin-Scholl wins the fourth season of Das Supertalent.

== Debuts ==
=== Domestic ===
- 12 April -
  - Danni Lowinski (2010–2014) (Sat.1)
  - Der letzte Bulle (2010–2014) (Sat.1)
- 27 April - Im Angesicht des Verbrechens (2010) (Arte)
- 20 August - X Factor (2010-2012) (RTL)
- 13 October - Rette die Million! (2010-2013) (ZDF)

=== BFBS ===
- (United Kingdom) Downton Abbey (2010-2015)
- (United Kingdom) / (Republic of Ireland) The Octonauts (2010-present)
- (United Kingdom) Alphablocks (2010-2013)

== Television shows ==
=== 1950s ===
- Tagesschau (1952–present)

=== 1960s ===
- heute (1963-present)

=== 1970s ===
- heute-journal (1978-present)
- Tagesthemen (1978-present)

=== 1980s ===
- Wetten, dass..? (1981-2014)
- Lindenstraße (1985–present)

=== 1990s ===
- Gute Zeiten, schlechte Zeiten (1992–present)
- Marienhof (1992–2011)
- Unter uns (1994-present)
- Verbotene Liebe (1995-2015)
- Schloss Einstein (1998–present)
- In aller Freundschaft (1998–present)
- Wer wird Millionär? (1999-present)

=== 2000s ===
- Big Brother Germany (2000-2011, 2015–present)
- Deutschland sucht den Superstar (2002–present)
- Let's Dance (2006–present)
- Das Supertalent (2007–present)

== Networks and services ==
=== Launches ===
Network	Type	Launch date	Notes	Source
sixx	Cable television	7 May		
Sky 3D	Cable television	13 October		
Bahn TV	Cable television	31 December		

=== Conversions and rebrandings ===
Old network name	New network name	Type	Conversion Date	Notes	Source
Deutsches Sportfernsehen	Sport1	Cable television	11 April		

=== Closures ===
Network	Type	End date	Notes	Sources
Focus Gesundheit	Cable television	15 September		

== See also ==
- 2010 in Germany
