= 1999 in German television =

This is a list of German television related events from 1999.

== Events ==
- 12 March - Corinna May is selected to represent Germany at the 1999 Eurovision Song Contest with her song "Hör den Kindern einfach zu". She is selected to be the forty-fourth German Eurovision entry during Countdown Grand Prix held at the Stadthalle in Bremen.
- 16 March - Corinna May is disqualified from the 1999 Eurovision Song Contest, when it is discovered that the winning song "Hor den Kindern einfach zu" was released in 1997 by another act, since entering a cover song is contrary to the rules. Sürpriz, who were runners-up with the song "Reise nach Jerusalem – Kudüs'e seyahat" are therefore promoted and announced as the forty-fourth German Eurovision entry.

== Debuts ==
=== Domestic ===
- 20 January - Liebe und weitere Katastrophen (1999) (Das Erste)
- 23 April - Delta Team (1999) (ProSieben)
- 3 September - Wer wird Millionär? (1999–present) (RTL)
- 12 October - Klemperer – Ein Leben in Deutschland (1999) (Das Erste)
- 1 November - Simsala Grimm (1999–2010) (KiKa)

=== International ===
- 4 January - (Australia) Skippy: Adventures in Bushtown (1998–1999) (Super RTL)
- 29 March - (United Kingdom) Teletubbies (1997–2001, 2015–present) (KiKa)
- 18 September - (Canada) / (Germany) Ned's Newt (1997–1999) (Super RTL)
- 21 September - (United Kingdom) Bimble's Bucket (1996–1998) (Junior)
- 2 October - (Australia) Flipper & Lopaka (1999–2005) (KiKa)
- 23 October - (United Kingdom) Bob the Builder (1999–2012, 2015–present) (Super RTL)
- (United States) Bruno the Kid (1996–1997) (K-Toon)

=== BFBS ===
- 22 April - (United Kingdom) Home Farm Twins (1999-2000)
- 8 May - (United Kingdom) Bob the Builder (1999-2012, 2015-present)
- 26 May - (United Kingdom) Pump It Up (1999-2000)
- 27 May - (United Kingdom) Polterguests (1999)
- 28 May - (United Kingdom) Butterfly Collectors (1999)
- 30 May - (United Kingdom) Dream Street (1999-2002)
- 15 June - (United Kingdom) / (United States) / (Canada) Anthony Ant (1999)
- 4 July - (Australia) Misery Guts (1998-1999)
- 11 October - (United Kingdom) Tweenies (1999-2002)
- 16 October - (United Kingdom) Barmy Aunt Boomerang (1999-2000)
- 26 October - (United Kingdom) Angelmouse (1999-2000)
- (United Kingdom) Maisy (1999-2000)
- (United Kingdom) / (Wales) Starhill Ponies (1998-2002)
- (United Kingdom) Mopatop's Shop (1999-2003)

== Changes of network affiliation ==
=== Military broadcasting ===
Title	Original Country	Former Network	New Network	Date
Alvin and the Chipmunks	United States	Armed Forces Network	BFBS	1999

== Television shows ==
=== 1950s ===
- Tagesschau (1952–present)

=== 1960s ===
- heute (1963-present)

=== 1970s ===
- heute-journal (1978-present)
- Tagesthemen (1978-present)

=== 1980s ===
- Wetten, dass..? (1981-2014)
- Lindenstraße (1985–present)

=== 1990s ===
- Gute Zeiten, schlechte Zeiten (1992–present)
- Marienhof (1992–2011)
- Unter uns (1994-present)
- Verbotene Liebe (1995-2015)
- Schloss Einstein (1998–present)
- In aller Freundschaft (1998–present)
- Wer wird Millionär? (1999-present)

== Networks and services ==
=== Launches ===
Network	Type	Launch date	Notes	Source
Cine Action	Cable television	Unknown		
Cine Comedy	Cable television	Unknown		
Romantic Movies	Cable television	Unknown		
Star*Kino	Cable television	Unknown		
Disney Channel	Cable television	16 October		
ZDFtheaterkanal	Cable television	9 December		

=== Conversions and rebrandings ===
Old network name	New network name	Type	Conversion Date	Notes	Source
Herz&Co	Sunset	Cable television	October		

=== Closures ===
Network	Type	End date	Notes	Sources
Sky Cinema	Cable television	October		

== See also ==
- 1999 in Germany
