= 2001 in German television =

This is a list of German television related events from 2001.

== Events ==
- 2 March - Michelle is selected to represent Germany at the 2001 Eurovision Song Contest with her song "Wer Liebe lebt". She is selected to be the forty-sixth German Eurovision entry during Countdown Grand Prix held at the Preussag Arena in Hanover.
- 12 May - Karina Schreiber wins season 3 of Big Brother Germany.
- 11 September - Both Das Erste and ZDF first announces a a terrorist attack on the United States during their 3pm UTC regular newsflash, before both channels airs their usual programming. The first channel to interrupt normal programming is private channel RTL Television, when Peter Kloeppel breaks into the game show Der Schwächste fliegt! at 3:09pm UTC for six minutes, before he returns on air thirteen minutes later. The channel would air their news special until 10:26pm UTC, when they broadcast coverage of the 2001–02 UEFA Champions League first group stage. ZDF then interrupts the court show Streit um drei twenty-five minutes later for a newsflash, before resuming the programme, which was cut off again fourteen minutes later. ProSieben, who breaks into Andreas Türck talk show a minute after ZDF's first programme interruption, then returns to normal programming at 3:58pm UTC, before proposing a simulcast with their news channel N24 from 6.02pm UTC. Das Erste then interrupts the nature documentary Abenteuer Wildnis at 3:32pm UTC for a three-minute newsflash, before the programme was cut off again thirteen minutes later. The channel's news coverage is presented by Claus-Erich Boetzkes and Ulrich Wickert, who both take their turns during the coverage. The last main channel to break into normal programming is Sat.1, who launches their news coverage after another court programme, Richterin Barbara Salesch at 4.03pm UTC. The channel's news coverage ends at 7:05pm UTC, when they also joins N24's news special. VOX's first newsflash is shown at 4:13pm UTC, breaking into the American series 7th Heaven. They does another news report at 5:17pm UTC, during the showing of Earth: Final Conflict. VOX's news special then starts at 6:42pm UTC, interrupting the cooking game show Kochduell. They ends the coverage at 10:14pm. Meanwhile, Kabel 1 makes their first newsflash during The Streets of San Francisco at 5:06pm UTC, before joining N24 as well twenty-two minutes later. RTL II joins its parent channel at 5:31pm UTC, after an episode of the American sitcom Unhappily Ever After, before breaking away at 10:26pm UTC. 9Live also simulcasts N24 programming. Both VIVA and Viva Zwei suspended their programming for that day. Among the programmes to be pulled from the day's schedule are Brisant, Verbotene Liebe, Marienhof, Großstadtrevier, Vater wider Willen, Sketchup, Plusminus, Boulevard Bio and Wat is? on Das Erste, heute – in Europa, Risiko, coverage of a UEFA Champions League game, All My Daughters, Ca$h – Das Eine-Million-Mark-Quiz, Frontal 21, 37° and Zurück auf Los! on ZDF, Das Jugendgericht, The Nanny, Unter uns, Exclusiv – Das Starmagazin, Explosiv – Das Magazin, Gute Zeiten, schlechte Zeiten, Medicopter 117 – Jedes Leben zählt and Im Namen des Gesetzes on RTL Television, Star Trek: The Next Generation, Quizfire, both editions of Die Quiz Show, Blitz, akte.01, Die Harald Schmidt Show, Frasier and Ran on Sat.1, Friends, Sabrina the Teenage Witch, The Simpsons, Galileo, Desert Forges - Stars an ihren Grenzen, TV total, BIZZ, Millennium and The X-Files on ProSieben, Little House on the Prairie, The Cosby Show, Geh aufs Ganze!, Glücksrad, Mermaids, MacGyver and Mission: Impossible on Kabel 1, The Wonder Years, The Fresh Prince of Bel-Air, Full House, The King of Queens, Dragon Ball Z, Popstars – Du bist mein Traum and Explosiv – Die Reportage on RTL II and The Golden Girls, Cosby, both episodes of The Pretender, Ally McBeal and Poltergeist: The Legacy on VOX. In addition, RTL Television and Sat.1's regional news magazines are also dropped on that day.

== Debuts ==
=== Domestic ===
- 21 April - Wissen macht Ah! (2001) (WDR)
- 24 May - Vera Brühne (2001) (Sat.1)
- 5 December - Die Manns – Ein Jahrhundertroman (2001) (ARD)

=== International ===
- 16 April - (United Kingdom) Tweenies (1999–2002) (KiKA)
- 17 April - (United States) / (France) Sonic Underground (1999) (Super RTL)
- 17 December - (Canada) / (France) / (United Kingdom) Redwall (1999–2002)

=== BFBS ===
- 9 February - (United Kingdom) S Club 7 Go Wild! (2000)
- (United Kingdom) Bill and Ben (1952-1953, 2001–2002)

== Television shows ==
=== 1950s ===
- Tagesschau (1952–present)

=== 1960s ===
- heute (1963-present)

=== 1970s ===
- heute-journal (1978-present)
- Tagesthemen (1978-present)

=== 1980s ===
- Wetten, dass..? (1981-2014)
- Lindenstraße (1985–present)

=== 1990s ===
- Gute Zeiten, schlechte Zeiten (1992–present)
- Marienhof (1992–2011)
- Unter uns (1994-present)
- Verbotene Liebe (1995-2015)
- Schloss Einstein (1998–present)
- In aller Freundschaft (1998–present)
- Wer wird Millionär? (1999-present)

=== 2000s ===
- Big Brother Germany (2000-2011, 2015–present)

== Networks and services ==
=== Launches ===
Network	Type	Launch date	Notes	Source
RTL Shop	Cable television	1 March		
MTV2 Pop	Cable television	1 May		
XXP	Cable television	7 May		
9Live	Cable television	1 September		
Bahn TV	Cable television	Unknown		
Premiere 1	Cable television	Unknown		
Premiere 2	Cable television	Unknown		
Premiere 3	Cable television	Unknown		
Sci Fantasy	Cable television	Unknown		
Premiere Action-X	Cable television	Unknown		

=== Conversions and rebrandings ===
Old network name	New network name	Type	Conversion Date	Notes	Source
N3	NDR Fernsehen	Cable television	3 December		
Cine Action	Premiere Action	Cable television	Unknown		
Cine Comedy	Premiere Comedy	Cable television	Unknown		
Star*Kino	Premiere Star	Cable television	Unknown		

=== Closures ===
Network	Type	End date	Notes	Sources
VH-1	Cable television	1 May		
tm3	Cable television	31 August		

== See also ==
- 2001 in Germany
