= Sky Cinema (disambiguation) =

Sky Cinema may refer to:

- Sky Cinema, a group of film channels on Sky UK and Ireland, formerly Sky Movies
  - Sky Cinema, the previous name of two Sky Movies channels on Sky UK and Ireland from 1998 to 2007
- Sky Cinema (Germany), a group of German film channels on Sky Deutschland, formerly Sky Film
  - Sky Cinema, a flagship channel of Sky Cinema Germany, formerly Premiere 1, 2 and 3
- Sky Cinema (Italy), a group of Italian film channels on Sky Italia
