= WMZ =

WMZ may refer to:

- Compressed Enhanced Metafile, a file format related to Windows Metafile
- KWMZ-FM, "Z-104.5, WMZ FM", a radio station in Empire, Louisiana, US
- WMZ TV, a TV station in Germany
