= Düzgün =

Düzgün ([dyzɡyn], meaning "smooth", "regular", "straight") is a rare Turkish surname and to a still lesser extent also a male given name. It is most popular among the Alevi Zaza Kurds in the eastern Tunceli Province also known as Dersim, where it is given in reverence to the local mythological character Düzgün Baba.

== Surname ==
- Gülşah Düzgün (born 1995), Turkish female Paralympian goalball player
- Orhan Düzgün (born 1967), Turkish bureaucrat
- Tekin Okan Düzgün (born 1988), Turkish national goalball player

== See also ==
- Düzgün TV, a defunct Turkish-language German television channel.
