= Fox (German TV channel) =

Defunct German pay-TV channel (2008-2021)

Fox Channel
- Country: Germany
- Broadcast area: Germany, Austria, Switzerland
- Headquarters: Munich, Germany

Programming
- Languages: English; German (dubbing/subtitles)
- Picture format: 1080i HDTV (downscaled to 16:9 576i for the SDTV feed)

Ownership
- Owner: Fox Networks Group Germany GmbH (Disney Media and Entertainment Distribution)
- Parent: Fox Corporation (News Corporation)
- Sister channels: National Geographic Channel; REN TV

History
- Launched: 19 May 2008; 18 years ago
- Replaced: Premiere Serie (on Premiere)
- Closed: 1 October 2021; 5 years ago

Links
- Website: www.foxchannel.de (archived, now redirects to www.disneyplus.com/de-de)

Fox (sometimes known as Fox Channel) was a German pay television channel dedicated to television drama series. It relied heavily on American and British drama series.

== History ==
On 10 March 2008, News Corporation applied for a broadcasting license for Fox International Channels Germany GmbH from MABB, the media authority for the Berlin Brandenburg region. The channel was greenlit a month later. It was launched on 19 May 2008 exclusively on satellite-television provider Premiere.

On 1 April 2009, the channel changed its aspect ratio from 4:3 to 16:9 widescreen. In October 2010, it launched its own HD feed, broadcasting at 1080i.

In November 2011, FOX bought pay-TV rights to rerun the first two seasons of legal drama The Good Wife. After a successful run, FOX bought the rights to show new episodes, starting with season three. The free-TV rights were with ProSiebenSat.1 Media which planned to broadcast the third season to be shown on sixx. However, season three was released on DVD with no free-to-air television broadcasts. On 10 July 2013, The Bridge premiered on FOX after a rerun of the original.

On October 4, 2017, Fox Networks Group Germany launched Fox+.

=== Closure ===
On 6 July 2021, it was announced that Fox, along with Disney Junior would close in Germany on 30 September 2021, on the same time with the Asian version and African version of the channel, with most of its content shifting to Star content hub on Disney+.

== Programming ==
Series broadcast on the channel included:

- 11.22.63 (11.22.63 – Der Anschlag) (2016–2021)
- American Horror Story (2011–2021) (Now on Disney+)
- Ashes to Ashes (2009–2013)
- Atlanta (2016–2021) (Now on Disney+)
- The Big C (The Big C ... und jetzt ich!) (2011–2015)
- The Bridge (2013–2016)
- Blue Bloods (2012–2021)
- Chris Ryan's Strike Back (Strike Back) (2011–2021)
- Curb Your Enthusiasm (Lass es, Larry!) (2008–2010) (Now on Sky Atlantic and Sky Comedy)
- Da Vinci's Demons (2013–2019) (Now on Disney+)
- Death in Paradise (2012–2021) (Now on Disney+)
- The Defenders (2012–2013)
- Den fördömde (Sebastian Bergman – Spuren des Todes) (2016–2021)
- Dirty Sexy Money (2008–2010) (Now on Disney+)
- Drop Dead Diva (2010–2016)
- Doctor Who (Revived series) (2011–2021) (Now on Disney+)
- Emergence (2019–2021)
- Entourage (2008–2013)
- Epitafios (Epitafios – Tod ist die Antwort) (2009–2013)
- Genius (2017–2021) (Now on Disney+)
- The Gifted (2018–2021) (Now on Disney+)
- The Good Fight (2017–2021) (Now on Disney+)
- The Good Wife (2011–2019)
- Greek (2008–2011) (Now on Disney+)
- The Guardian (The Guardian – Retter mit Herz) (2010–2013)
- Hart of Dixie (2014–2017)
- Hawaii Five-O (2010) (2012–2021)
- Hotel Babylon (2009–2010)
- How I Met Your Mother (2014–2018) (Now on Disney+)
- Kojak (2012–2015)
- Las Vegas (2008–2010)
- Law & Order: UK (2010–2013) (Now on 13th Street and RTL Nitro)
- Law & Order: Special Victims Unit (2010–2014)
- Legion (2017–2021) (Now on Disney+)
- Longmire (2014–2021)
- Lost (2008–2011) (Now on Disney+)
- Mad Men (2009–2017)
- Magnum, P.I. (Magnum) (2013–2014)
- Medium (2008–2013)
- The Nanny (Die Nanny) (2010-2012)
- Nashville (2013–2021)
- Navy CIS (2012–2021)
- Navy CIS: L.A. (2016–2021)
- The Night Shift (2014–2021)
- Outcast (2016–2021)
- Pod Prikritie (Undercover) (2014–2021)
- Prison Break (2017–2021) (Now on Disney+)
- Providence (2008–2010)
- Ray Donovan (2014–2017)
- Rules of Engagement (2011–2016)
- Salamander (2013–2016)
- Sex and the City (2011–2015)
- Shameless (2012–2021)
- Skins (2009–2012)
- Sleepy Hollow (2014–2021) (Now on Disney+)
- Snowfall (2018–2021) (Now on Disney+)
- The Sopranos (Die Sopranos) (2008–2010)
- Suits (2013–2021)
- The Walking Dead (2010–2021) (Now on Disney+)
- Wayward Pines (2015–2021) (Now on Disney+)
- The West Wing (2008–2012)
- The Wire (2008–2012)

== Audience share ==
=== Germany ===
	January	February	March	April	May	June	July	August	September	October	November	December	Annual average
2014	-	0.1%	0.1%	0.1%	0.1%	0.1%	0.1%	0.1%	0.1%	0.1%	0.1%	0.1%	0.1%
2015	0.1%	0.2%	0.2%	0.1%	0.1%	0.2%	0.1%	0.2%	0.1%	0.2%	0.2%	0.1%	0.1%
2016	0.1%	0.1%	0.1%	0.1%	0.1%	0.1%	0.1%	0.1%	0.1%	0.2%	0.1%	0.1%	0.1%
2017	0.2%	0.2%	0.2%	0.2%	0.2%	0.2%	0.2%	0.3%	0.2%	0.2%	0.2%	0.2%	▲0.2%
2018	0.2%	0.2%	0.2%	0.2%	0.2%	0.2%	0.2%						
