= Universal TV (Germany) =

- Country: Germany
- Broadcast area: Germany, Austria, Switzerland
- Headquarters: Munich, Germany

Programming
- Language: German/English
- Picture format: 576i (16:9 SDTV); 1080i (HDTV)

Ownership
- Owner: Sky Deutschland
- Sister channels: 13th Street

History
- Launched: 5 September 2013; 13 years ago
- Former names: Universal Channel (2013-2018)

Links
- Website: www.sky.de/sender/universaltv

Availability

Universal TV (originally Universal Channel) is a German pay-TV channel, operated by Sky Deutschland and headquartered in Munich. The station was announced on 22 May 2013 and launched on 5 September 2013.

As part of a global rebrand, the channel changed its name in Germany to Universal TV on 2 July 2018.

It was folded into Sky Deutschland operations in December 2023.

== Programming ==
The channel mainly broadcasts series and some feature films. The station's prime time starts at 9pm, sometimes premieres. All programmes are dubbed into German and also their original audio. Besides reruns of series originally broadcast on other channels, Universal TV also broadcast first-run programmes in German.

=== Current ===
Sources:

- Bones (Bones – Die Knochenjägerin) (2022–present)
- Chicago Fire (2013–present)
- Chicago Med (2016–present)
- Chicago P.D. (2018–present)
- Hawaii Five-0 (2025–present)
- Modern Family (2024–present)
- The Rookie (2024) (now on Sky One and ZDFneo)

=== Former ===
- 'Til Death (Ehe ist...) (2015–2017)
- According to Jim (Immer wieder Jim – Jim hat immer Recht!) (2016–2019)
- Anger Management (2015–2017)
- Bates Motel (2013–2017)
- Burden of Truth (2020–2023)
- The Catch (2017–2019)
- Castle (2013-2014, 2016–2024)
- Charmed (Charmed – Zauberhafte Hexen) (2022–2023)
- Departure (2019–2024)
- Desperate Housewives (2022–2023)
- Devious Maids (Devious Maids – Schmutzige Geheimnisse) (2014–2017)
- The Driver (2015–2016)
- Fire Country (2022–2025)
- The Goldbergs (Die Goldbergs) (2016–2017)
- Grimm (2024)
- House (Dr. House) (2023–2025)
- King Solomon’s Mines (Quatermain und der Schatz des König Salomon) (2023–2024)
- The Magicians (2022–2023)
- Matlock (2025)
- Men in Kilts: A Roadtrip with Sam and Graham (Men in Kilts) (2021–2025)
- Monk (2016–2021)
- Nurses (2020–2023)
- Outlander (2021–2025)
- Rake (2014, 2016)
- Royal Pains (2016–2017)
- Secrets and Lies (2015–2016)
- State of Affairs (2015–2016)
- Superstore (2016–2019)
- Upright (2020–2024)
- Weeds (Weeds – Kleine Deals unter Nachbarn) (2014)

== Logos ==
5 September 2013 – 1 July 2018

2 July 2018 – present

Universal TV HD

== Audience share ==
=== Germany ===
	January	February	March	April	May	June	July	August	September	October	November	December	Annual average
2017	0.1%	0.1%	0.1%	0.1%	0.1%	0.1%	0.1%	0.1%	0.1%	0.1%	0.1%	0.1%	0.1% '
2018	0.1%	0.1%	0.1%	0.1%	0.1%								
