= National Geographic (German TV channel) =

- Country: Germany
- Broadcast area: Germany; Austria; Switzerland

Programming
- Language: German
- Picture format: 1080i HDTV (downscaled to 16:9 576i for the SDTV feed)

Ownership
- Owner: The Walt Disney Company Germany GmbH

History
- Launched: 1 November 2004; 22 years ago

Links
- Website: www.nationalgeographic.de

National Geographic is a German pay television channel dedicated to documentaries and factual programmes.

The channel was launched on 1 November 2004 on Kabel Deutschland's digital platform, broadcasting 24 hours per day from the start. The channel also launched on other cable networks such as Unitymedia, Kabel BW, and UPC Cablecom

On 16 May 2009, National Geographic Channel replaced Discovery Geschichte on the Premiere satellite platform. This was followed by the launch of the German Nat Geo Wild when it replaced Animal Planet on Premiere on 1 July, a few days before Premiere was rebranded and became Sky Deutschland. National Geographic Channel HD was also launched on Sky in July 2009. Distribution of the Nat Geo People program derivative was discontinued in German-speaking countries as of September 12, 2017.

On December 1, 2022 it was announced that the National Geographic Channel and Nat Geo Wild would be dropped from Sky Deutschland by the end of January 2023, however, the channel returned on July 1, 2025. The channels will however remain active in other German TV operators to US version.

== Audience share ==
	January	February	March	April	May	June	July	August	September	October	November	December	Annual average
2014	-	0.1%	0.1%	0.1%	0.1%	0.1%	0.1%	0.1%	0.1%	0.1%	0.1%	0.1%	0.1%
2015	0.1%	0.1%	0.1%	0.1%	0.1%	0.1%	0.1%	0.1%	0.1%	0.1%	0.1%	0.1%	0.1%
2016	0.1%	0.1%	0.1%	0.1%	0.1%	0.1%	0.1%	0.1%	0.1%	0.1%	0.1%	0.1%	0.1%
2017	0.1%	0.1%	0.1%	0.1%									
