= International Television Expert Group =

International Television Expert Group (ITVE)
- Formation: 2007
- Type: Broadcasting Association
- Headquarters: Berlin, Germany
- Members: 1,200
- Official language: English
- Managing Director: Frank Giersberg
- Website: http://www.itve.org

The International Television Expert Group (ITVE) is a global television business information and networking platform. It was founded on October 12, 2007 in Berlin, Germany.

== Mission ==
The International Television Expert Group's mission is to connect television executives from around the world. The group wants to enhance dialogue and improve networking activities for its members and to support global knowledge exchange and international collaboration. In addition, it provides global television market information to the public.

== Organisation ==
The International Television Expert Group is a non-profit and supra-organizational platform, supported by national industry bodies and their members. The group is led by its meeting of members and is managed day-to-day by its managing director.

== Members ==
Members of the group have to be actively involved in broadcasting industries at a proven executive level, and they are typically a member of their national TV industry association. In the beginning of 2010, there were approximately 1,200 members based in more than 100 countries, taking on executive roles at some of the world's leading television broadcasters, such as ABC, AETN, Al Jazeera, ARD, BBC, BSkyB, Canal+, CBS, CCT, CCTV, CNN, Comcast, Constantin Film, Discovery Communications, Disney Channel, Endemol, ESPN, Eurosport, Fox, Globo TV, HBO, IP Network, ITV, Mediaset, MTV Networks, NBC Universal, Nova TV, NTV, ORF, Paramount Pictures, ProSiebenSat.1, QVC, RAI, RTL Group, RTVE, Showtime, Sky Italia, Sony Pictures Television International, STAR TV, Tata, TF1, Turner Broadcasting, TV Azteca, TV2, TV3, TVN, Viasat, Warner Bros., Weather Channel, ZDF, and Zee Network.

== Activities ==
The group is operating an information platform open to the public, but also an internal platform exclusively for its members to organize their information and knowledge exchange. It is moderating industry discussions and various professional communities.

In the fields of online media the group manages collaborative projects for its members, such as the "International TV Explorer", a project to identify the world's leading online TV and video portals and to connect the responsible online TV project managers.

The International Television Expert Group is also supporting international TV industry and media policy related conferences around the world, such as the Asian Future TV Conference in Shanghai, and it is providing data on global TV markets, used by many experts and frequently quoted in newspapers, magazines and in science.

== Partners ==
The International Television Expert Group is supported by various television industry bodies, such as the Association of Commercial Television in Europe, the Cable & Satellite Broadcasting Association of Asia, the German Broadcasting Association, or the Ukrainian Television Industry Committee. But it is also partnering with other industry related associations, like the Broadcast Mobile Convergence Forum, the Format Recognition and Protection Association, the International Advertising Association and even with television regulation authorities such as the Cyprus Radio and Television Authority.
