= Sky Comedy (Germany) =

Defunct German version of Sky Comedy

- Country: Germany
- Broadcast area: Germany, Austria, Switzerland

Programming
- Languages: German, English
- Picture format: 1080i (HDTV)

Ownership
- Owner: Sky Deutschland
- Sister channels: List of Sky Deutschland channels

History
- Launched: 1 April 2021; 5 years ago
- Closed: 27 September 2023; 3 years ago

Sky Comedy was a German television channel which was operated and owned by Sky Deutschland. The channel was launched on April 1, 2021.

== History ==
=== Launch ===
The channel was launched on April 1, 2021 along with Sky Crime. The channel broadcast a variety of local and international Sky Originals as well as HBO and Showtime shows.

Among the shows broadcast on the channel were the Sky Original production A Short History of Humor. Quatsch Comedy Club with Thomas Hermanns found a new broadcasting home and was seen alongside new episodes of Comedy@Sky with Tutty Tran, Erika Ratcliffe, Ingmar Stadelmann and Mr. Schröder.

=== Closure ===
On May 30, 2023, it was announced that Sky Comedy would be removed from the platform in German-speaking countries by mid-September. The channel closed on September 27, 2023 after two years on air.

== Programming ==
=== Final Programming ===
- Brooklyn Nine-Nine
- Comedy@Sky
- Crime Scene Cleaner
- Pastewka
- Quatsch Comedy Club

=== Former Programming ===
- And Just Like That...
- Avenue 5
- Ballers
- Barry
- Betty
- Black Monday
- Bored to Death
- Breeders
- Californication
- Call Your Mother
- Camping
- Code 404
- Crashing
- Curb Your Enthusiasm
- Entourage
- Fat Actress
- Flatbush Misdemeanors
- Flight of the Conchords
- Free for All
- Girls
- The Goldbergs
- High Maintenance
- Hot in Cleveland
- How I Met Your Mother
- Insecure
- Intelligence
- It's Always Sunny in Philadelphia
- Ladykracher
- Little Britain USA
- The Mindy Project
- Moonbase 8
- My Name Is Earl
- Nurse Jackie
- Parks and Recreation
- Raising Hope
- The Righteous Gemstones
- Run
- Sally4Ever
- Schitt’s Creek
- Schooled
- Silicon Valley
- Single Parents
- Spitting Image
- Stromberg
- Superstore
- Two Weeks to Live
- The Unicorn
- Veep
- Vice Principals
- Wellington Paranormal
- Who Is America?
- Work in Progress
- Young Rock
