= Sky Atlantic (Germany) =

- Logo used since 2026
- Country: Germany
- Broadcast area: Germany, Austria, Switzerland

Programming
- Languages: German, English
- Picture format: 1080i (HDTV)
- Timeshift service: Sky Atlantic+1 (2015-2017)

Ownership
- Owner: Sky Deutschland GmbH
- Sister channels: List of Sky Deutschland channels

History
- Launched: 23 May 2012; 14 years ago

Links
- Website: www.sky.de

Sky Atlantic is a German pay-TV station specializing in the broadcasting of HBO productions and originally had the slogan The Home of HBO.

== History ==
The pay-TV station started its broadcast in HD on 23 May 2012 at 9 pm and was free of charge for three weeks for all Sky subscribers. For the regular reception, the "Sky Entertainment" package and optionally the HD channels must be subscribed. A SD version was started on December 3, 2013. Since 5 November 2015, a one-hour timeshift of Sky Atlantic is also available in HD.

The best audience, with 0.48 million viewers, scored the channel with the premiere of the seventh season of the series Game of Thrones on 17 July 2017.

The timeshift channel Sky Atlantic+1 was switched off on 11 September 2017. The service was replaced by the timeshift service Sky1+1 on 22 September 2017.

== Programming ==
=== Current programming ===
- A Discovery of Witches (2023–present)
- A Town Called Malice (2023–present)
- And Just Like That... (2023–present)
- Art in the City (2019–present)
- Babylon Berlin (2018–present)
- Bad Behaviour (2023–present)
- Banshee (2013–present)
- Barry (2018–present)
- The Brink (The Brink – Die Welt am Abgrund) (2015–2020; 2023–present)
- Code 404 (2024–present)
- Devils (2020–present)
- Domina (2021–present)
- Fallen (2024–present)
- The Fear Index (2022–present)
- For Life (2020–present)
- Game of Thrones (Game of Thrones - Das Lied von Eis und Feuer) (2012–present)
- House of the Dragon (2022–present)
- Il Re (2022–present)
- Industry (2020–present)
- It's Always Sunny in Philadelphia (2024–present)
- Kapitelweise (2019–present)
- Kunst.Stoff (2019–present)
- The Lazarus Project (2022–present)
- Lovecraft Country (2020–present)
- Mary & George (2024–present)
- Mayans M.C. (2020–present)
- The Midwich Cuckoos (2022–present)
- The Night Of (2015–2021; 2023–present)
- The Outsider (2020–present)
- The Regime (2024–present)
- The Righteous Gemstones (2020–2021; 2023–present)
- Sex and the City (2020–2021; 2023–present)
- Sharp Objects (2018–present)
- Silicon Valley (2015–present)
- The Sopranos (Die Sopranos) (2012–present)
- Strike (C.B. Strike) (2018–present)
- Strike Back (2014–present)
- Temple (2020–present)
- Thronecast (2015; 2019–present)
- Unwanted (2023–present)
- Warrior (2019–present)
- We Own This City (2022–present)

=== Former programming ===
- 100 Code (2015–2016)
- American Crime Story (2017–2023)
- Angry Boys (2013–2019)
- Animals (Animals.) (2016–2020)
- Ballers (2015–2016)
- Band of Brothers (2012–2021; 2024)
- Big Little Lies (2017–2024)
- Big Love (2012–2024)
- Boardwalk Empire (2013–2022; 2024)
- Borderliner (Der Grenzgänger) (2018–2019; 2021–2022; 2024)
- Bored to Death (2013–2020)
- Britannia (2018–2024)
- Californication (2018–2021)
- Camelot (2012; 2015–2016)
- The Casual Vacancy (The Casual Vacancy - Ein plötzlicher Todesfall) (2015–2024)
- Curb Your Enthusiasm (Lass es, Larry!) (2012–2016; 2018–2020; 2023–2024)
- The Deuce (2017–2024)
- Dexter (2012–2015; 2018–2021)
- Dirty Sexy Money (2012–2014)
- Eli Stone (2012–2014)
- Empire Falls (2015–2018; 2020–2024)
- Entourage (2012–2020; 2024)
- Fortitude (Fortitude - Ein Ort wie kein anderer) (2015–present)
- Grey's Anatomy (Grey's Anatomy - Die jungen Ärzte) (2017–2018; 2020–2021)
- Happyish (2016–2019)
- Here and Now (2018–2021; 2023–2024)
- House of Cards (2013–2020)
- I'm Dying Up Here (2017–2019; 2021)
- Insecure (2017–2020; 2024)
- Jett (2019–2024)
- Landscapers (2022–2024)
- La peste (Die Pest) (2018–2023)
- Little Britain USA (Little Britain in the USA) (2012–2020)
- Madam Secretary (2018–2021)
- Mosaic (2018–2024)
- Olive Kitteridge (2015–2024)
- Patrick Melrose (2018–2022)
- Peaky Blinders (Peaky Blinders - Gangs of Birmingham) (2014–2017)
- Polyamory: Married & Dating (Polyamorie - Liebe zu dritt) (2018–2020)
- Prófugos (Prófugos - Auf der Flucht) (2015–2018)
- The Putin Interviews (2017–2020)
- Ray Donovan (2017–2021)
- Rectify (2013–2019; 2021)
- Riviera (2017–2024)
- Room 104 (2017–2024)
- Save Me (2018–2024)
- Saving My Tomorrow (2015–2021)
- Shooter (2017–2018; 2020)
- Six Feet Under (2012–2024)
- SMILF (2017–2021)
- Supernatural (2012–2016; 2018–2019)
- The Time Traveler’s Wife (2022–2024)
- Tin Star (2017–2024)
- True Blood (2012-2024)
- Veep (2012–2020; 2023)
- Versailles (2016–2020)
- Wentworth (2017–2023)
- Westworld (2016–2024)
- White Famous (2017–2020)
- Who Is America? (2018–2020)
- The Wire (2012–2024)

== Logo history ==
Sky Atlantic logo used from 2012 to 2015

Sky Atlantic logo used from 2020 to 2026
