= Focus Gesundheit =

- Country: Germany
- Broadcast area: Germany, Austria
- Headquarters: Munich, Germany

Programming
- Picture format: 576i (4:3 SDTV)

History
- Launched: 1 June 2005; 19 years ago
- Closed: 15 September 2010; 14 years ago

Links
- Website: focusgesundheit.tv

Focus Gesundheit was a German television channel about health, nutrition, medicine and workout. It is connected to Focus TV Produktions GmbH, which is also behind the current affairs programme Focus TV which airs on ProSieben. January 2010 exclusively via Premiere, and later Sky, after which this distribution channel was discontinued. From February 2010, the program was to be marketed via cable kiosk and IPTV. The station received its broadcasting license from the Bavarian Regulatory Authority for Commercial Broadcasting (BLM) in Munich. The approval period initially ran until May 31, 2013.

Within Germany, the channel is only available through Sky.
