= Center.tv =

center.tv
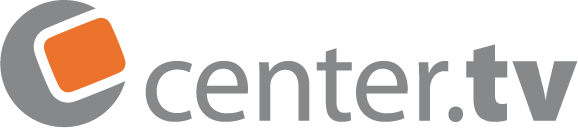
- Country: Germany

Programming
- Language: German

Ownership
- Owner: center.tv Holding AG

History
- Launched: October 2005

Links
- Website: www.center.tv

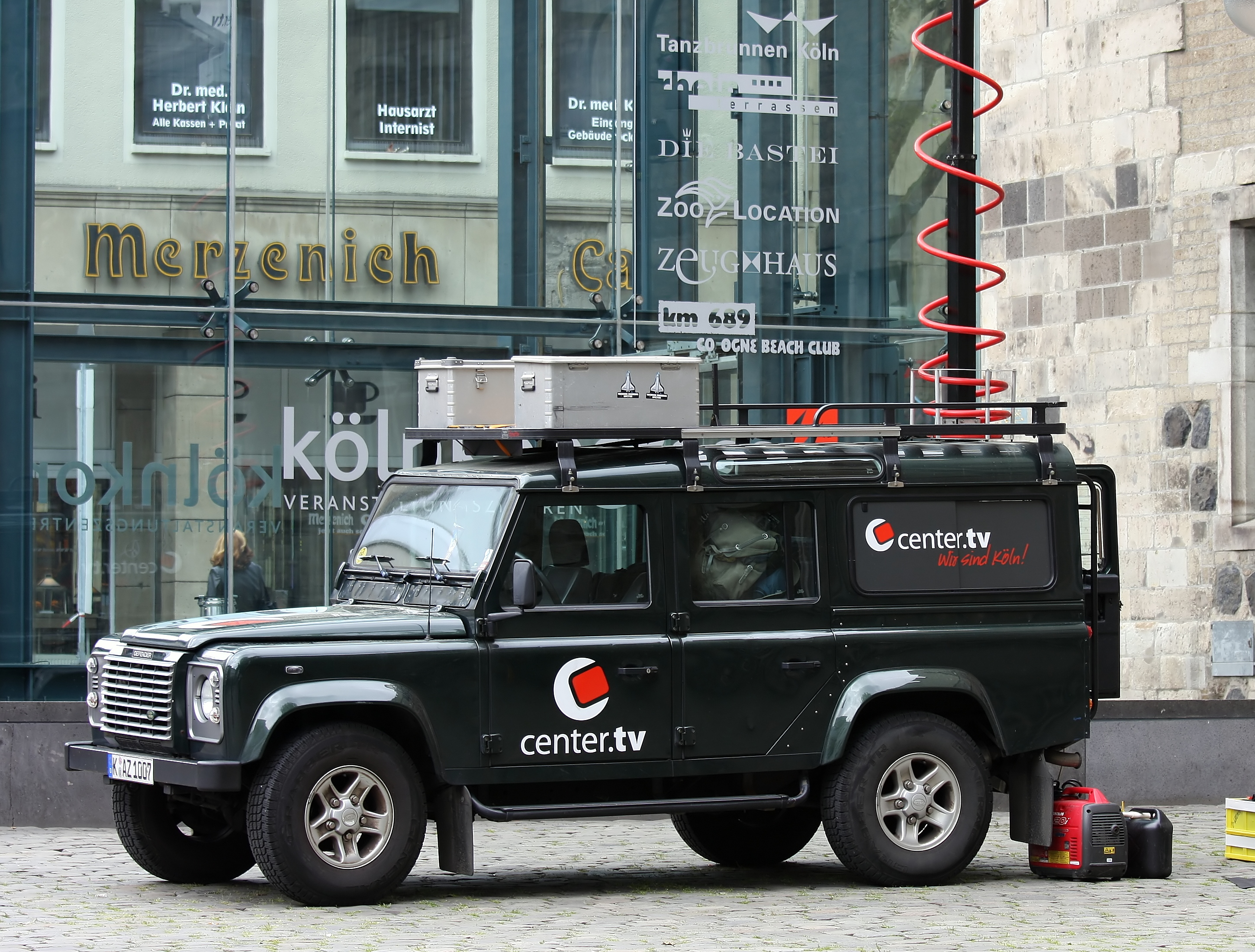
center.tv OB Van in front of the Gürzenich

center.tv was a German regional TV channel, with customised programmes for Aachen. It broadcasts 24/7, providing with information, service, entertainment, culture and sport-oriented formats, including short advertisement breaks to lend an opportunity for smaller local companies to promote themselves. center.tv can be received via a digital or analogue cable connection, and via internet livestream.

Journalistic activity on the part of center.tv is limited to being carried out mainly by video and hobby journalists.
