= Vodafone Deutschland =

Cable television operator in Germany

Vodafone Deutschland GmbH
- Company type: Subsidiary
- Industry: Telecommunications
- Founded: Early-1980s (as Deutsche Bundespost Kabelfernsehen); 1999 (DeTeKS); 2003 (Kabel Deutschland)
- Headquarters: Unterföhring, Germany
- Key people: Manuel Cubero (CEO)
- Products: Cable television Broadband internet Fixed telephony Mobile telephony
- Revenue: ▲€1.830 billion (2012/13)
- Net income: ▲€0.247 billion (2012/13)
- Total assets: ▲€2.858 billion (2012/13)
- Total equity: ▲ (€1.470 billion) (2012/13)
- Number of employees: 3,157 (average, 2012/13)
- Parent: Vodafone
- Website: www.vodafone.de

Vodafone Deutschland GmbH is the largest cable television operator in Germany. Kabel Deutschland was subject to a hostile takeover bid by the British Vodafone Group in September 2013; the deal was approved in December 2013 and finalised on 29 January 2014. Until the takeover the company name was Kabel Deutschland.

== Company ==
Old company logo (2003–2014)

Vodafone Deutschland GmbH operates in 13 of the 16 states of Germany except Baden-Württemberg, North Rhine-Westphalia and Hesse. In 2006, of the 15.4 million households passed by their cable the company served 9.6 million, however only one third of these are direct customers of Kabel Deutschland, since especially in large apartment complexes the in-house cable networks are owned by cable service companies or housing associations.

Kabel Deutschland was founded in January 1999 by the former German telecom monopoly Deutsche Telekom operating as Deutsche Telekom Kabel Services GmbH (DeTeKS) in order to spin off its entire cable television business as required by regulatory terms. The cable TV network was established from the early-1980s on by the German federal post office, and predecessor of Deutsche Telekom, Deutsche Bundespost. Kabel Deutschland was split into nine regional companies, of which three were sold to other investors until 2002. The remaining six were sold in 2003 to the US investment firms Providence Equity Partners, Apax Partners and Goldman Sachs Alternatives. From February 2006 to September 2010, Kabel Deutschland was majority-owned by Providence Equity Partners.

On 24 June 2013, Vodafone announced a takeover bid for Kabel Deutschland valued at €7.7 billion. The board recommended the bid above that of rival Liberty Global. On 23 September the deal was approved by the European Commission, and shortly after Vodafone completed its acquisition of 76.57% of shares in the company.

== Products and services ==
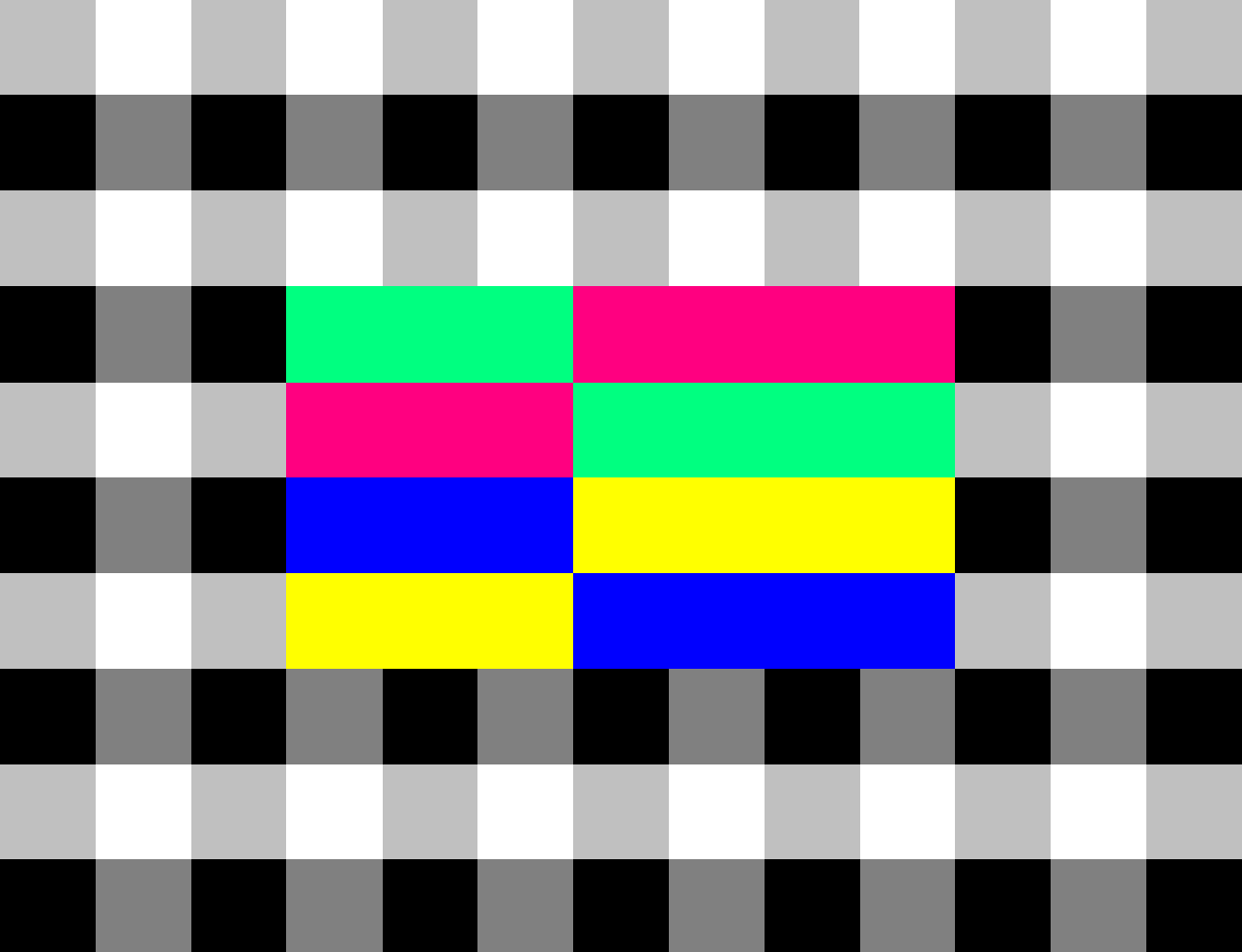
Test card used on many cable TV headends of Deutsche Bundespost Kabelfernsehen (predecessor of Kabel Deutschland) from the 1980s–c. 1999. May also have been used in the Netherlands.

With a basic plan, Kabel Deutschland offers about 30 free-to-air analogue TV and an equal number of FM and digital radio channels. All analogue TV channels are available in the digital DVB-C encoding format, Plus an additional 70 television channels are not available in analogue.

On top of that, about 100 digital pay TV channels can be ordered as a subscription-based service. This includes Germany's pay TV broadcasters Sky Deutschland as well as Kabel Deutschland's own offerings.

On 1 February 2012, Kabel Deutschland ceased to use the Astra 23.5°E position for distribution, switching to its terrestrial fibre network.

Furthermore, Kabel Deutschland offers Internet (Kabel Internet, up to 1000 MBit/s downstream and 75 MBit/s upstream from November 2014) and telephone services (Kabel Phone).

For historical reasons, Kabel Deutschland cannot offer its products directly to all who are connected via Kabel Deutschland's network, since only one third of all viewers are direct customers. In the early-1980s, when the cable network was established, Kabel Deutschland's predecessor, Deutsche Bundespost had to leave in-house cables to other companies or the house owners. This turned out to be a significant obstacle since Kabel Deutschland now has to make single contracts with hundreds of small cable operators.
