= Sky Crime (German TV channel) =

- Logo used from 2021 to 2026
- Country: Germany
- Headquarters: Unterföhring, Germany

Programming
- Picture format: 1080i (16:9 HDTV)

Ownership
- Owner: Sky Deutschland
- Sister channels: List of Sky Deutschland channels

History
- Launched: 1 April 2021; 5 years ago

Sky Crime is a German-language TV channel, operated by Sky Deutschland. It launched on 1 April 2021 and broadcasts a mix of true crime documentaries and drama series.
