= Sky Sci-Fi (Germany) =

- Logo used since May 2026
- Country: Germany
- Broadcast area: Germany and Switzerland
- Headquarters: Munich, Germany

Programming
- Language: German
- Picture format: 576i (16:9 SDTV); 1080i (HDTV)

Ownership
- Owner: Sky Deutschland
- Sister channels: List of Sky Deutschland channels

History
- Launched: 1 September 2003; 23 years ago (SD); 9 November 2010; 15 years ago (HD)
- Former names: Sci Fi Channel (2003–2010); Syfy (2010–2026)

Links
- Website: www.sky.de/sender/skyscifi

Logo used from January to May 2026

Sky Sci-Fi is a German pay television operated by Sky Deutschland, a division of RTL Group launched on 1 September 2003. It was the third Sci Fi Channel to be launched, following the US and U.K. versions. From 2003 until 2010, it was known as the Sci-Fi channel. and Syfy until 2026.

It was folded into Sky Deutschland operations in December 2023.

On 27 January 2026, the channel was renamed Sky Sci-Fi.

== Programming ==
- Aftermath (2017–present)
- Agents of S.H.I.E.L.D. (Marvel's Agents of S.H.I.E.L.D.) (2017–present)
- Alphas (2013–2016)
- Battlestar Galactica (1978) (2003–2007, 2010–2012)
- Battlestar Galactica (2004) (2004, 2007–2009, 2011–2013)
- Battlestar Galactica: Blood & Chrome (2016–present)
- Bionic Woman (2010–2012)
- Blood Drive (2018–present)
- Dark Matter (2015–present)
- Defiance (2013–2016)
- Doctor Who (2008–2011)
- Dominion (2016–present)
- Earth 2 (2005–2007)
- Eureka (EUReKA – Die geheime Stadt) (2009–2014)
- Fantasy Island (2007–2009)
- Farscape (Farscape – Verschollen im All)
- From the Earth to the Moon (2006–2007)
- Godzilla: The Series (Godzilla – Die Serie)
- Haven (2010–present)
- Helix (2014–2016)
- Heroes Reborn (2015–2016)
- Incorporated (2017–present)
- Killjoys (2016–present)
- Krypton (2018–present)
- Lavalantula (2016–present)
- Legend Quest (2012–present)
- Lexx: The Dark Zone Stories
- Lost Girl (2016–present)
- Agent Carter (2015–present)
- Marvel's Runaways (2018–present)
- Psi Factor: Chronicles of the Paranormal (Psi-Faktor – Es geschieht jeden Tag)
- Quantum Leap (Zurück in die Vergangenheit)
- The Invisible Man (Invisible Man – Der Unsichtbare)
- The Powers of Matthew Star (Der Junge vom anderen Stern)
- Saber Rider and the Star Sheriffs
- The Six Million Dollar Man (Der Sechs-Millionen-Dollar-Mann)
- Spider-Man (Spiderman)
- Stargate Atlantis (2008–present)
- Stargate SG-1 (Stargate Kommando SG-1)
- Star Trek: Deep Space Nine
- Star Trek: The Next Generation (Raumschiff Enterprise – Das nächste Jahrhundert)
- Star Trek (Raumschiff Enterprise)
- Star Trek: Voyager (Star Trek: Raumschiff Voyager)
- Star Wars: The Clone Wars (2016–present)
- TekWar (TekWar – Krieger der Zukunft)
- The Bionic Woman (Die Sieben-Millionen-Dollar-Frau) (2007–2009)
- The Outer Limits (Outer Limits – Die unbekannte Dimension)
- The Shannara Chronicles (2017–present)
- The Six Million Dollar Man (Der 6-Millionen-Dollar-Mann) (2004–2007)
- Torchwood (2015–2016)
- Warehouse 13 (2010–2015)
- Z Nation (2015–present)

== Audience share ==
=== Germany ===
	January	February	March	April	May	June	July	August	September	October	November	December	Annual average
2012	-	-	-	-	0.2%	0.1%	0.2%	0.2%	0.2%	0.2%	0.2%	0.2%	0.1%
2013	0.2%	0.2%	0.2%	0.2%	0.2%	0.2%	0.2%	0.2%	0.2%	0.1%	0.1%	0.1%	▲0.2%
2014	0.2%	0.2%	0.2%	0.2%	0.1%	0.2%	0.2%	0.2%	0.1%	0.1%	0.2%	0.1%	0.2%
2015	0.1%	0.2%	0.2%	0.2%	0.2%	0.2%	0.3%	0.2%	0.2%	0.2%	0.2%	0.3%	0.2%
2016	0.2%	0.2%	0.2%	0.2%	0.2%	0.2%	0.2%	0.1%	0.2%	0.1%	0.1%	0.1%	0.2%
2017	0.1%	0.1%	0.1%	0.1%	0.2%	0.2%	0.2%	0.2%	0.1%				
