= Television in Germany =

Television in Germany began in Berlin on 22 March 1935, broadcasting for 90 minutes three times a week. It was home to the first regular television service in the world, named Fernsehsender Paul Nipkow.

In 2000, the German television market had approximately 36.5 million television households, making it the largest television market in Europe. Nowadays, 95% of German households have at least one television receiver. All the public-service German television channels are free-to-air.

== History ==
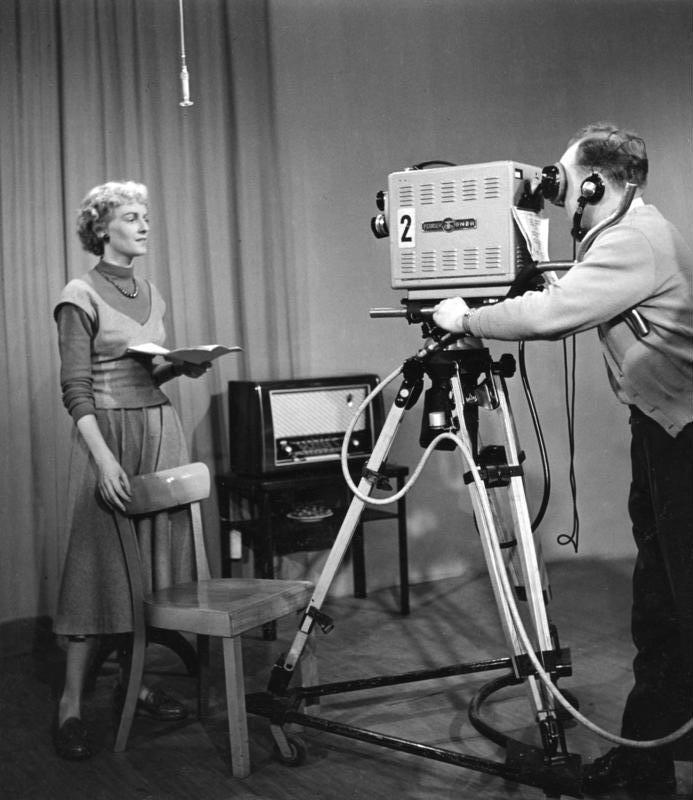
Continuity announcer Gabriela Hellweg at the WDR studios in Cologne (November 1953)

In 1948 the British occupation forces allowed NWDR to broadcast television programmes for the British zone. Other regional networks also started to launch television in their own areas. Meanwhile, the GDR was launching its own television service, Deutscher Fernsehfunk (DFF), based on the Soviet model.

A regular schedule began through the cooperation of all ARD members in 1954. Basic principles in the central areas of entertainment, information and enlightenment were established and television plays developed as the medium's own specific art form. Improvements in technology and programming, as well as reduced prices, led to a steady increase in licence holders, and the number of licenses passed the 1-million mark in October 1957.

On 1 April 1963, the long-promised second television network, the Zweites Deutsches Fernsehen (Second German Television) started. Unlike ARD, which was regionalized and had its roots in radio, ZDF was a centrally organized channel devoted solely to television. On 25 August 1967, at 9:30 a.m. on both ARD and ZDF, vice chancellor Willy Brandt started the era of colour television in West Germany by pressing a symbolic launch button at the International Radio and Television Fair in West Berlin.

East Germany started DFF2 in 1969, and introduced colour programming on both channels. In 1972, the DFF was renamed, dropping the pretense of being an all-Germany service and becoming Fernsehen der DDR (GDR Television) or DDR-FS. Its two channels became known as DDR1 and DDR2.

The first two privately financed television networks, RTL plus (short for Radio Television Luxemburg) and SAT 1, started their programming in West Germany in 1984. (Previously RTL broadcast from Luxembourg but was only received in parts of Southwestern Germany).

After reunification, the television stations of the German Democratic Republic were dissolved and the remnants were used to found new regional networks, e.g. the Mitteldeutscher Rundfunk (Central German Broadcasting), as part of the ARD. In addition, more private television stations opened, becoming available through cable, satellite and in some cases, over the airwaves.

== Market ==
Today, with almost 40 million television households, 365 television channels licensed in Germany and a total market volume of €9,615 million in 2008, Germany represents one of the biggest and most diversified television markets in the world. The strongest revenue segment in Germany is public funding (€4,430 million in 2008), followed by advertising (€4,035 million) and subscription (1,150 € million). This dominant market position of public and advertisement funded free television channels in Germany explains why the German pay television segment is significantly underperforming in an international comparison.

In terms of total television viewing market share, Germany's market leaders in 2024 were again the two biggest public-service channels (ZDF with 15.3% and Das Erste with 13.0%) and the two leading commercial channels (RTL with 8.1% and Sat.1 with 4.5%). The leading pay TV provider was Sky Deutschland (see below). The biggest teleshopping providers in Germany are QVC and HSE24.

With 18.1 million television households satellite is the dominant television infrastructure in Germany, followed by cable (17.9 million television households) and terrestrial (3.8 million television households). In a 2010 survey half of German television viewers said they often found nothing to watch on television.

The Germanophone sphere is the largest market for dubbing in Europe. Foreign television shows and other formats are often dubbed into German, while subtitled formats with the original language are also becoming more popular.

== Channels ==
The channels with the largest viewing share in 2024 are:

Position	Channel	Owner	Share of total viewing (%) in 2024	Share of total viewing (%) in 2011	Comparison 2024/2011
1	ZDF	ZDF	15.3	12.1	▲ (3.2)
2	Das Erste	ARD	13.0	12.4	▲ (0.6)
3	RTL	RTL Group	8.1	14.1	▼ (6.0)
4	Sat.1	ProSiebenSat.1 Media	4.5	10.1	▼ (5.6)
5	Vox	RTL Group	4.3	5.6	▼ (1.3)
6	Kabel Eins	ProSiebenSat.1 Media	2.8	4.1	▼ (1.3)
6	ProSieben	ProSiebenSat.1 Media	2.8	6.2	▼ (3.4)
6	ZDFneo	ZDF	2.8	0.4	▲ (2.4)
7	NDR Fernsehen	NDR/RB	2.6	2.5	▲ (0.1)

The combined share of ARD's so called Third Programmes (regional broadcasters WDR, NDR, SWR, etc.) was 13.6% in 2024

=== Subscription channels ===
Germany's sole subscription channel Premiere had its heyday around the millennium. Premiere offered telecasts of the German football league – the Bundesliga, but they lost the broadcasting rights in 2006 to a newly formed competitor – Arena. Premiere was the brainchild of the former television czar, Leo Kirch. He went into insolvency after a decade of losing viewers from his subscription channel, DF1 (Digital television 1). The company regained some ground with its new manager Georg Kofler.

In 2005, several German cable companies created a new challenger to Premiere - ARENA. The participating companies are iesy (Hesse) and ish (TV) (North Rhine-Westphalia) through their combined partnership called "Unity Media". Arena, a rather small company, wanted to buy the pay-television rights to the German Bundesliga and won by a decision of the marketing directorate of the DFL. The rights to broadcast the Bundesliga is regarded as lucrative in the German television market, so previous rights holders Premiere suffered a wounding blow to their business model. Arena held the rights from 2006 to 2008. Further negotiations were due in 2008 for the broadcasting of the Bundesliga.

== Public broadcasters ==
ARD member broadcaster map

As stated above, the ARD was the first German broadcasting station. It has a federally orientated structure. At present, nine regional public broadcasters cooperate to produce programs for the television network known as Das Erste (The First):

- Norddeutscher Rundfunk – North German Broadcasting – Hamburg, Lower Saxony, Schleswig-Holstein and Mecklenburg-Vorpommern
- Radio Bremen – also a television broadcaster – Bremen
- Rundfunk Berlin-Brandenburg – Berlin-Brandenburg Broadcasting – Berlin and Brandenburg
- Mitteldeutscher Rundfunk – Central German Broadcasting – Saxony, Saxony-Anhalt and Thuringia
- Westdeutscher Rundfunk – West German Broadcasting – North Rhine-Westphalia
- Hessischer Rundfunk – Hessian Broadcasting – Hesse
- Südwestrundfunk – South Western Broadcasting – Baden-Württemberg and Rhineland-Palatinate
- Saarländischer Rundfunk – Saarland Broadcasting – Saarland
- Bayerischer Rundfunk – Bavarian Broadcasting – Bavaria

Seven of these broadcasters run their own regional television programs (The Third), most of them use several frequencies and show local opt-outs.

While multi-state-broadcasters NDR, RBB, MDR and SWR have state versions (e.g. RBB Berlin, MDR Sachsen, NDR Hamburg and SWR Baden-Württemberg), BR and WDR have regional opt-outs below state level (BR: North and South, WDR: 11 versions). Two small regions, Bremen (RB) and the Saarland (SR), have their own broadcasting stations, mainly for historical reasons. They only contribute to the national television channel Das Erste and produce a state opt-out for their neighbour broadcaster (SR Fernsehen on SWR, Radio Bremen TV on NDR).

== Teletext ==
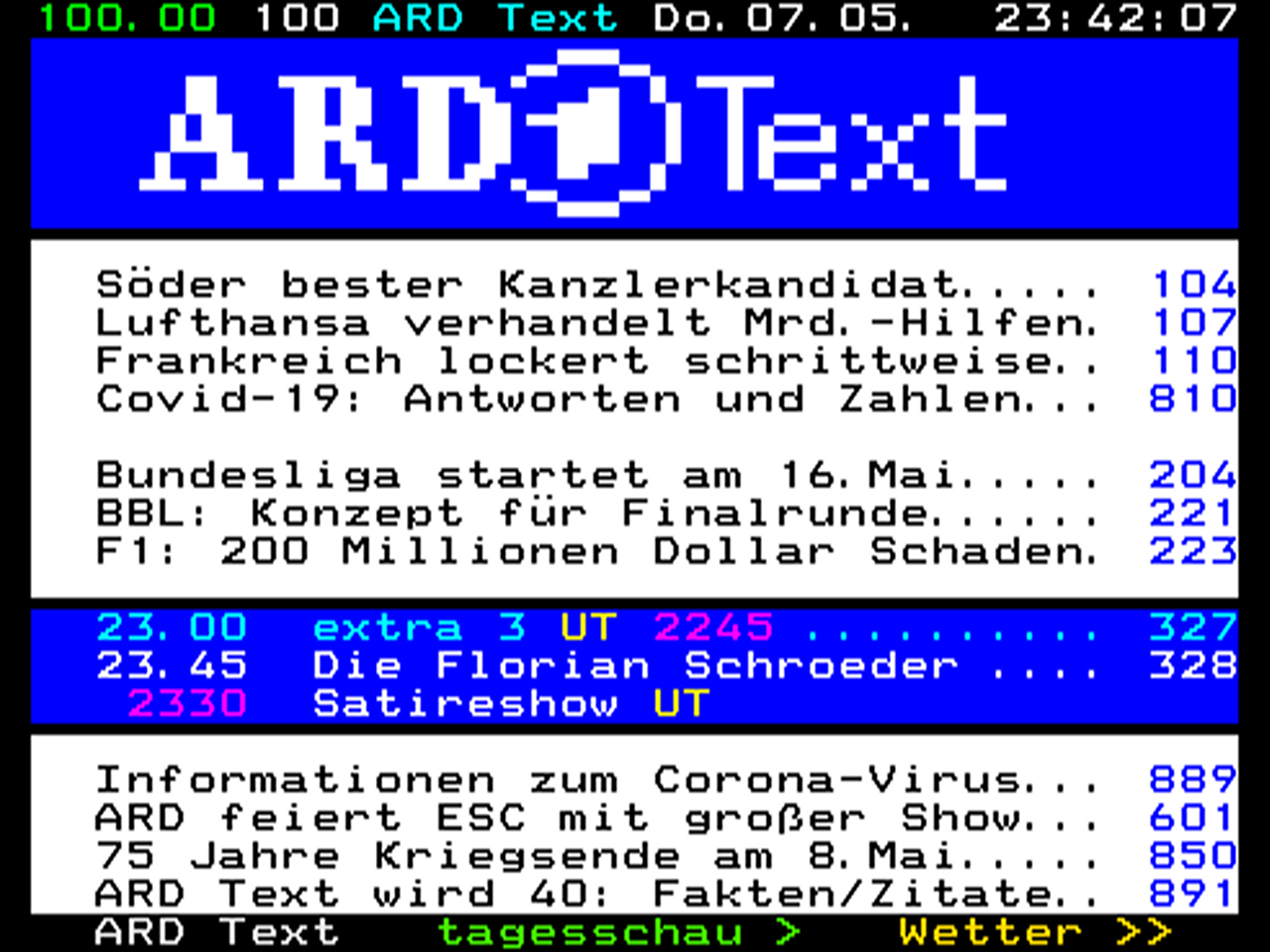
May 2020 teletext page 100 of German public broadcaster ARD

Germany has run a regular Teletext service (often called Videotext) since 1 June 1980 on the public broadcasting channels. Almost all German television stations have teletext. Even with the advent of digital television, teletext is still widely used.

Teletext pages are selected via a three-digit number, ranging from 100 to 899. While every station is free to organize their teletext pages in any way, most adhere to the following de facto standard:

- 100 Main page
- 110 News
- 120 News / Weather
- 200 Sports / Soccer
- 300 Television schedule
- 333 On air now
- 600 Advertising, chats, phone sex (commercial channels only)

The teletext system is also used to transmit subtitles on a special, transparent page (usually 149, 150 or 777), so that both text and the normal picture are visible. With the advent of digital television however, a few stations discarded teletext subtitles and are now using the subtitles feature of the Digital Video Broadcasting (DVB) system.

== Reception ==
Technology	Total households	Relative households
Satellite	17,779,000	46.1%
Cable (digital)	11,229,000	29.1%
Cable (analogue)	6,630,000	9.9%
DVB-T	3,865,000	10.0%
DSL-TV	1,899,000	4.9%
All	38,557,000	100%

=== Satellite ===
Digital satellite television has been officially available in Germany since 1996. Prior to May 2012, most of the 30+ television stations broadcast their satellite signal using both analogue and digital (DVB-S); however, all analogue satellite broadcasts ceased on 30 April 2012.

There is currently a single pay television satellite operator in Germany - Sky Deutschland. Prior to being known as Sky, the service was named Premiere; it (along with its former owner Leo Kirch) got into serious financial trouble due to its early and proprietary usage of encryption (Betacrypt, D-box). Subsequently, Premiere was bought by News Corporation and renamed Sky, in keeping with their satellite services elsewhere in Europe (Sky (UK and Ireland) and Sky Italia).

HDTV via satellite

In late 2004 German channel group ProSieben showed a BBC documentary and a self-produced television movie in 1080i via MPEG-2 DVB-S, followed by the Hollywood films Spider-Man and Men in Black II in March 2005. These were intended to be a test for future commercial HD services.

Regular free to air broadcast of the HD versions of ProSieben and Sat.1 began on 26 October 2005. Unlike the test broadcasts, DVB-S2 and MPEG-4 AVC were used. Both ProSieben HD and Sat.1 HD ceased their unencrypted broadcasts in 2008; encrypted HD broadcasting of both channels resumed under the HD+ brand (which also included other commercial channels; see below) in January 2010.

Premiere, after several delays, started broadcasting three HD channels — one each dedicated to films, sports and documentaries — in November 2005, although there were virtually no suitable, certified receivers available on the market. The content was also sparse and thus often repeated. Sky (formerly Premiere) reuses its proprietary digital rights management system embedded into its content scrambling system (Nagravision) from SD broadcasts to block analogue output of the movie channel from the receiving set-top box altogether, only allowing HDCP-secured transmissions; the other channels are less restricted.

On 1 November 2009, the premium HD+ service launched with two channels, RTL HD and Vox HD, with Sat.1 HD, ProSieben HD and Kabel eins HD joining the service in January 2010. DSF HD (now called Sport1 HD) began test broadcasts in August 2010 and launched fully on HD+ on 1 November 2010, followed by Sixx HD and RTL2 HD on 1 December 2010. In June 2011, Comedy Central HD, Nickelodeon HD and N24 HD joined service, bringing the number of channels offered to 11. In April 2011, HD+ became available to Sky Deutschland subscribers without the need for an HD+ CAM and viewing card (although an additional subscription is still required).

Currently (as of May 2012) all satellite HDTV channels are broadcast using the h.264 codec. As of July 2014, most material is upscaled SD content.

Free-to-air HDTV via satellite

Prior to 30 April 2012 there were eight free-to-air HDTV channels originating in Germany broadcast via satellite: Das Erste HD, ZDF HD, Arte HD, Anixe HD, EinsFestival HD, sonnenklar.TV HD, QVC HD and HSE24 HD. After 30 April 2012, when all analogue satellite broadcasts ceased, ten additional FTA HD channels became available (all of which are public service channels): Phoenix HD, NDR HD, WDR HD, BR HD, SWR HD, ZDFneo HD, ZDFinfo HD, ZDFkultur HD, 3sat HD and KiKa HD. From December 2013 on all PSB channels except ARD-alpha, SR Fernsehen and Radio Bremen TV are available in HD.

=== Cable ===
DVB-C transmission started in 2004 with pay television Premiere and digital versions of the analogue channels.

The rather late changeover to DVB was caused both by the long process of selling the infrastructure of former monopolist Deutsche Telekom to others and the fact that the cable network ends at the curb or property, with the in-house cable in large apartment buildings being operated by a different company. Due to this, the new owners of Deutsche Telekom's cable network were in many cases not able to offer new products directly to the viewer.

By 2006, there were three major cable operators, Unity Media in Hesse, North Rhine-Westphalia and Baden-Württemberg and by far the largest, Kabel Deutschland in the other 13 states. Today, all companies offer about 200 television channels by DVB-C, which includes some 70 channels at no extra charge as well as a number of pay-per-view offers and subscription-based packages (like the HD-broadcasts of privately owned channels, comparable to HD+ on satellite). In addition to that pay television broadcaster Sky Deutschland is also available.

In some very large apartment complexes a number of local and national companies operate an in-house cable network which is fed solely by its own satellite antenna on the building, not the local cable operator. The satellite channels are either transcoded into analogue transmission, receivable by any television set without extra equipment, or into DVB-C.

As of 2014, still 17.2% of Germany transmits television with analogue cable signals, compared to 29.1% of digital cable; this similar to the situation in the Netherlands, Sweden and Belgium, where analogue cable is also still widely used.

=== Terrestrial ===
Terrestrial reception had lost most of its users by the 1990s due to extensive cable and satellite coverage. In a two step process analogue terrestrial television broadcasting in the states of Berlin and Brandenburg was switched off in 2003 and replaced by DVB-T, in 2005, about two-thirds of Germany's states began to replace analogue transmission. By 2006, all metropolitan and most rural areas had moved to digital transmission. Today, only foreign army bases and some local television stations still broadcast on analogue.

While the public broadcasters ARD and ZDF transmit throughout Germany, commercial stations often are only available within metropolitan areas, so the number of available channels varies between about 10 and 30. All DVB-T1 channels were free-to-air and the broadcasters rented transmission services directly from a transmitter operator, usually Media Broadcast. ARD stations also use their own transmitters.

In June 2016, a gradual switch-over from DVB-T with MPEG-2 encoding to DVB-T2 with HEVC encoding has commenced. The first phase included one new multiplex broadcasting six channels in selected urban areas, in addition to the old DVB-T standard. The DVB-T2 channels are broadcasting in 1080p50. The commercial channels are encrypted and part of the "Freenet TV"-Package. The final switch-over to DVB-T2 occurred in steps, starting with major metropolitan areas who switched on 29 March 2017. The last transmitter is planned to switch in 2019.

== Series ==
Almost all fictional programs on German television are regular television series. While the public broadcaster(s) predominantly own(s) the productions that are broadcast, the private stations/networks often put on series licensed from abroad, mainly the United States. Peaking in the 1990s, the private channels had aired self-produced series such as Der Clown (1996–2000), Alarm für Cobra 11 – Die Autobahnpolizei (Alarm for Cobra 11 - The Motorway Police) (since 1996), The Sentinel (1994–1996), Alpha Team - The Lifesaver in OP (1996–2005) or Wolff's Turf (mainly from 1992 to 2006) with great success. Since the late 2000s, the amount of original series on the private broadcasters has markedly declined.

The highest-rated series is the crime drama Tatort, which airs almost every Sunday on public broadcaster ARD. It has run since 1970 and has featured several casts, that are not related to each other.

== See also ==
- Telecommunications in Germany
- List of television stations in Germany
- List of German language television channels
- List of German television series
- German television comedy
- International Television Expert Group
- Media of Germany
- Dubbing (filmmaking) § Germany, Austria and Switzerland
