= Düzgün TV =

German Turkish-language television channel

Düzgün TV was a private TV channel, based in Lünen, Germany, that aired programming targeted at Turkish Germans. The channel was granted its licence from the local state broadcasting authority in Düsseldorf in March 2006. It filed for bankruptcy in 2007 and is no longer on air.

== Format ==
Programming focused on assisting German Turks with integration into German society, as well as bringing them closer with Turkey. More broadly, it also promoted the democratization of Turkey and its admission into the European Union. A further stated goal was to provide coverage of Alevi lifestyle and culture, a religious group with many followers in both Germany and Turkey.

Programs were in Turkish, with German subtitles.
