= 100 Code =

Swedish crime drama TV series

- Genre: Crime drama
- Based on: Merrick by Ken Bruen
- Developed by: Bobby Moresco
- Directed by: Lisa James Larsson; Bobby Moresco; Jonathan Sjöberg; Andreas Öhman
- Starring: Dominic Monaghan; Michael Nyqvist; Felice Jankell; Charlotta Jonsson; Danilo Bejarano
- Opening theme: "Hard Time" by Seinabo Sey
- Composer: Adam Nordén
- Countries of origin: Sweden; Germany
- Original languages: English; Swedish
- No. of seasons: 1
- No. of episodes: 12

Production
- Executive producers: Jan David Frouman; Irina Ignatiew; Jon Petersson; Henrik Bastin
- Producers: David Guillod; Joakim Hansson
- Cinematography: Ulf Brantås
- Editors: Max Arehn; Roberth Nordh; Sebastian Marka
- Running time: 45 minutes
- Production companies: Fabrik Entertainment; Strix; Red Arrow; Kanal 5; Sky Deutschland

Original release
- Network: Sky Krimi
- Release: 14 May – 30 July 2015

100 Code (also known as The Hundred Code) is an internationally co-produced Swedish crime drama series, developed by Bobby Moresco, that first aired on German premium channel Sky Krimi on May 14, 2015. The series, which stars German-born British actor Dominic Monaghan and the late Swedish actor Michael Nyqvist, is based upon Ken Bruen's 2014 novel Merrick, and follows Tommy Conley (Monaghan), an NYPD detective who travels to Stockholm to advise and investigate a particularly gruesome series of murders.

The series was broadcast on Sky Atlantic in the United Kingdom, airing weekly from January 6, 2016. A DVD release of the complete series was released on October 30, 2015 in Germany, and on March 28, 2016 in the UK. The series premiered in the United States on WGN America on May 29, 2018.

== Premise ==
Detective Tommy Conley travels to Stockholm to advise and investigate a particularly gruesome series of murders. Young, blonde, blue-eyed women are found murdered at regular intervals near water bodies and flower fields. Conley has to work with the Swedish investigator Mikael Eklund. The two hate each other, both fight with their own demons. After initial problems, the investigators investigate a series of murders, which, as initially thought, is not limited to New York and Stockholm, but has much larger dimensions.

== Cast ==
=== Main ===
- Dominic Monaghan as Tommy Conley
- Michael Nyqvist as Mikael Eklund
- Felice Jankell as Hanna Eklund
- Charlotta Jonsson as Karin Hammar
- Danilo Bejarano as Björn Johnsson

=== Recurring ===
- Kristoffer Berglund as Phille
- Peter Eggers as Göran
- Hedda Stiernstedt as Josephine
- Roisin Murphy as Maggie
- Martin Wallström as Tomas
- Christian Svensson as Andrej
- Patrick Brennan as The Dentist
- Magnus Krepper as Henrik Renberg
- Johanna Hedberg as Sandra Olsson
- Aliette Opheim as Asha
- Anna Åström as Frida
- Joe Pacheco as Frank Scarpetta

== Episodes ==
No.	Title	Directed by	Written by	Original release date	UK viewers (millions)
1	"Pilot"	Bobby Moresco	Bobby Moresco & Henrik Sylvén	May 14, 2015	0.31
Tommy Conley, an NYPD detective, arrives in Stockholm to continue tracking a serial killer with a very specific M.O.
2	"Flowers in Hell"	Bobby Moresco	Bobby Moresco	May 21, 2015	0.18
Spending every hour attempting to prevent any further killings, Conley narrows his search down to two suspects.
3	"Down the Rabbit Hole"	Bobby Moresco	Henrik Sylvén	May 28, 2015	0.19
Eklund and Conley are on the hunt for a missing suspect who leaves them with a chilling warning.
4	"My Only Friend"	Andreas Öhman	Bobby Moresco	June 4, 2015	0.16
Conley and Ecklund find a lead to a suspect on the Dark Web - someone using the initials "LH".
5	"The First Blush"	Andreas Öhman	Amanda Moresco & Bill Tangradi	June 11, 2015	0.14
Conley and Eklund continue their investigation into the "Temptations" chat room, while L.H. attempts to recruit Andrej.
6	"There Are No Heroes"	Andreas Öhman	Henrik Sylvén	June 18, 2015	0.17
Both Conley and Eklund struggle with ghosts from the past. Frida continues her deadly hunt.
7	"The Cop That Hugs"	Lisa James Larsson	Bobby Moresco & Michael Yebba	June 25, 2015	0.19
A disgruntled ex-cop goes on a kill frenzy, taking out a member of Eklund's team. Meanwhile, Andrej hunts for his next victim.
8	"Nobody Sleeps"	Lisa James Larsson	Bobby Moresco & Allan Steele	July 2, 2015	0.19
The team create an online persona to infiltrate the "Temptations" chatroom and draw information out from L.H.
9	"The Deep Heart's Core"	Lisa James Larsson	P.J. Hennigan	July 9, 2015	0.17
The police investigate a sex party organiser when a young woman's body is found. Meanwhile, Phille uses his fake avatar to trap L.H.
10	"Secrets"	Jonathan Sjöberg	Henrik Sylvén	July 16, 2015	0.16
The team find a key piece of evidence when investigating Sofia's murder.
11	"Still Living After All"	Jonathan Sjöberg	Henrik Sylvén	July 23, 2015	0.10
Conley has a breakthrough in the case when paintings found in Andrej's cabin seem familiar.
12	"Everytime You Think You're Winning"	Jonathan Sjöberg	P.J. Hennigan	July 30, 2015	0.15
Conley's interrogation tactics finally yield results.
