= Sky 3D (German TV channel) =

Sky 3D Deutschland
- Broadcast area: Germany, Austria
- Network: Sky Deutschland
- Headquarters: Unterföhring, Germany

Programming
- Language: German
- Picture format: 1080i (3DTV)

Ownership
- Owner: Sky Deutschland AG

History
- Launched: 13 October 2010; 15 years ago
- Closed: 1 July 2017; 9 years ago

Links
- Website: www.sky.de/3d

Sky 3D was a German television channel of Sky Deutschland that lasted from 2010 to 2017. It only broadcast 3D content.

== History ==
Sky 3D launched on 13 October 2010 via Astra 19.2°E and cable operator Kabel BW in regular operation, prior to a test broadcast. The transmitter was free for all customers for 3 months. Since then, the was made available free of charge. The broadcasting time was usually between 11 and midnight, while in the broadcast-free time, trailers were shown. From summer 2013, a one-time activation fee of €29.90 was required to access the channel. Sky 3D was discontinued on 1 July 2017 due to its low ratings.
