= Sky Cinema (German TV channel) =

Set of movie TV channels owned by Sky Deutschland

- Logo used from 2020 to 2026
- Country: Germany
- Broadcast area: Germany; Austria; Switzerland

Programming
- Picture format: 576i (16:9 SDTV); 1080i (HDTV)

Ownership
- Owner: Sky Deutschland
- Sister channels: List of Sky Deutschland channels

History
- Launched: February 1991

Sky Cinema is a German set of movie channels owned by Sky Deutschland.

== History ==
=== Origins ===
The different channels in the package mostly have their origins in the analogue Premiere channel which started broadcasting in 1991 and the movie channels of the DF1 platform started in 1996. The movie package on the DF1 platform consisted of Cine Action, Cine Comedy, Romantic Movies, Star*Kino and Western Movies.

When DF1 and Premiere merged to form the platform "Premiere World" in October 1999, it movie package, which was called "Movie World", consisted of the Premiere channel and 13th Street as well as the former DF1 channels Star*Kino, Cine Action, Cine Comedy, Sci Fantasy and Romantic Movies while Western Movies closed.

This structure remained until July 2001 when Premiere World relaunched their packages and brought all the channels they owned under the Premiere umbrella brand.

- The digital version of Premiere was extended to three channels: Premiere Movie 1, Premiere Movie 2 and Premiere Movie 3
- Star*Kino was renamed Premiere Star
- Cine Comedy was renamed Premiere Comedy
- Sci Fantasy was renamed Premiere Sci-fi
- Cine Action was renamed Premiere Action
- Romantic Movies was closed down and replaced with Premiere X-Action, a sister channel of Premiere Action. This new channel also featured professional wrestling programming.

In May 2002, "Premiere World" became simply "Premiere". At the same time, all movie channels were numbered ranging from Premiere 1 to Premiere 7.

On 1 August 2006, the channels were overhauled again. Premiere 1 to Premiere 4 became part of a package called "Premiere Blockbuster", which also included Disney Channel. Premiere 5, Premiere 6 and Premiere 7 were closed down and replaced by Premiere Filmclassics and Premiere Filmfest. They became part of a package called "Premiere Entertainment", which also included Premiere Serie, Premiere Krimi and Premiere Nostalgie.

"Premiere Blockbuster" and "Premiere Entertainment" merged and became "Premiere Film" in on 1 July 2008.

=== 2009 relaunch ===
On 4 July 2009, Premiere was relaunched and became Sky Deutschland. All Premiere channels were renamed. The movie channels got the following names:

- Premiere 1 split into two channels: Sky Cinema and Sky Action
- Premiere 2 became Sky Cinema +1
- Premiere 3 became Sky Cinema +24
- Premiere 4 became Sky Comedy
- Premiere Filmclassics became Sky Cinema Hits, now "Sky Hits"
- Premiere Filmfest became Sky Emotion
- Premiere Nostalgie became Sky Nostalgie

The Premiere Film channels were sold with Disney Channel and Fox Channel. When Sky was relaunched, those two channels were moved to the Sky Welt package, while the MGM Channel and Disney Cinemagic took their place. Premiere Krimi was moved to the Sky Welt package and became Sky Krimi.

With the relaunch, the channels adopted the searchlights-themed graphics, used by the British Sky Movies channels since 2007, with the logos replaced by those of German counterparts. Sky Cinema uses Sky Movies Premiere's ident, while Sky Action uses Sky Movies Action & Thriller's, Sky Emotion uses Sky Movies Drama's, Sky Nostalgie uses Sky Movies Classics', Sky Comedy uses Sky Movies Indie's (not Sky Movies Comedy's), and Sky Cinema Hits uses the original idents of Sky Movies HD 1 and 2.

When the channels where rebranded, there was only one high-definition simulcast channel, Sky Cinema HD. It was joined by two more HD simulcasts on 13 August 2010, Sky Cinema Hits HD and Sky Action HD.

=== 2020 relaunch ===
On 11 March 2020, Sky Cinema was revamped with new and renamed channels:

- Sky Cinema and Sky Cinema +24 became Sky Cinema Premieren and Sky Cinema Premieren +24. Sky Cinema +1 will close.
- Sky Cinema Comedy, Nostalgie, Emotion and Hits were replaced by Sky Cinema Family (SD/HD), Sky Cinema Best Of (SD/HD), Sky Cinema Special (HD), Sky Cinema Thriller (HD), Sky Cinema Fun (SD), and Sky Cinema Classics (SD).
- Sky Cinema Action continued to broadcast, in HD and SD as before.

=== 2024 relaunch ===
On 11 April 2024, Sky Cinema saw its linear lineup of channels reduced in order to put more efficience on its video on demand service:

- Sky Cinema Premieren +24, Sky Cinema Thriller and Sky Cinema Fun were closed.
- Sky Cinema Premieren was renamed to Sky Cinema Premiere and Sky Cinema Best Of was renamed to Sky Cinema Highlights.
- Warner TV Film and Paramount+ are now offered free of charge.

== Channels ==
=== Current ===
The Sky Cinema package includes six Sky-branded channels:

Channel number	Channel name	Description
300	Sky Cinema Premiere	The premium channel with 20 television premieres per month.
301	Sky Cinema Blockbuster	With popular movies from the course of cinema history.
302	Sky Cinema Action	With action, horror and sci-fi movies.
303	Sky Cinema Feelgood	With various kinds of comedy and family movies.
304	Sky Cinema Classics	With classic movies until present days.
305	Sky Cinema Special	Used for a pop up channel for an event

- HD versions of all channels are available except for Sky Cinema Classics.
- Warner TV Film and Paramount+ are also offered free of charge.

Movies are broadcast in the 16:9 widescreen format with both German and original audio, when available. In order to watch movies in high-definition, payment is required for Sky HD, another set of programs. By booking this set, the channels fitting into the other booked sets, such as Sky Sport are decrypted as well.
