= Sky One (Germany) =

- Logo used since 2026

- Alternate Logo
- Country: Germany
- Broadcast area: Germany, Austria, Switzerland

Programming
- Picture format: 1080i (HDTV)

Ownership
- Owner: Sky Deutschland
- Sister channels: List of Sky Deutschland channels

History
- Launched: 3 November 2016; 9 years ago

Links
- Website: sky.de/sky1

Sky One (written as Sky 1 until 31 March 2020) is an entertainment channel operated and owned by Sky Deutschland. The channel launched on 3 November 2016.

== History ==
A sister channel to UK-based Sky One, the channel broadcasts originally produced shows and series and international series. It is available via cable, satellite and IPTV in HD to all Sky Deutschland subscribers as part of the Sky Starter basic package.

The timeshift service Sky 1 +1 started on 22 September 2017 and replaced the timeshift channel Sky Atlantic +1.

In November 2018, Sky 1 +1 was closed.

== Programming ==
Most of the channel's programming is available on Sky On Demand, Sky Go and the Sky Ticket OTT service.

=== Original programming ===
- Babylon Berlin (2017–present)
- Das Boot (2018–present)

=== Entertainment ===
- Dogs Might Fly (2016–present)
- Eine Liga für sich - Buschis Sechserkette, German version of A League of Their Own (2017–present)
- MasterChef USA (2016–present)
- MasterChef (German version of the format) (2016–present)
- Mitfahr-Randale - Wer aussteigt, verliert (2016–present)
- Xaviers Wunschkonzert Live (2017–present)

=== Series ===
- 100 Code (2017)
- 9-1-1 (2018–present)
- 9-1-1: Lone Star
- Ballers (2016–present)
- Bordertown (2017)
- Boston Blue (May 2026)
- Desperate Housewives (2016–present)
- Doc Martin (2016–present)
- Doctor Doctor (The Heart Guy) (2017–present)
- Edel & Starck (2017–present)
- Elementary (2016–present)
- Elsbeth (August 2024)
- Grey's Anatomy (Grey's Anatomy - Die jungen Ärzte) (2017–present)
- Hooten & the Lady (2016–present)
- La Brea
- Madam Secretary (2016–present)
- Magnum PI
- Madoff (Madoff - Der 50-Milliarden Dollar Betrug) (2016–present)
- Medici: Masters of Florence (2016–present)
- Morgen hör ich auf (2017–present)
- Patrick Melrose (2018–present)
- Riviera (2017–present)
- Poker Face
- The Equalizer
- The Endgame
- The Rookie
- Shades of Blue
- S.W.A.T. (2018–present)
- Supernatural (2016–present)
- The Paper
- Transplant
- The Good Doctor (2018–present)
- Watson
- Victoria (2016–present)
- Wentworth (2016–present)
- You, Me and the Apocalypse (2017–present)

== Logos ==
(2016–2020)

(April-June 2020)

(2020–2026)

(2026–present)
