= 13th Street (German TV channel) =

German television channel

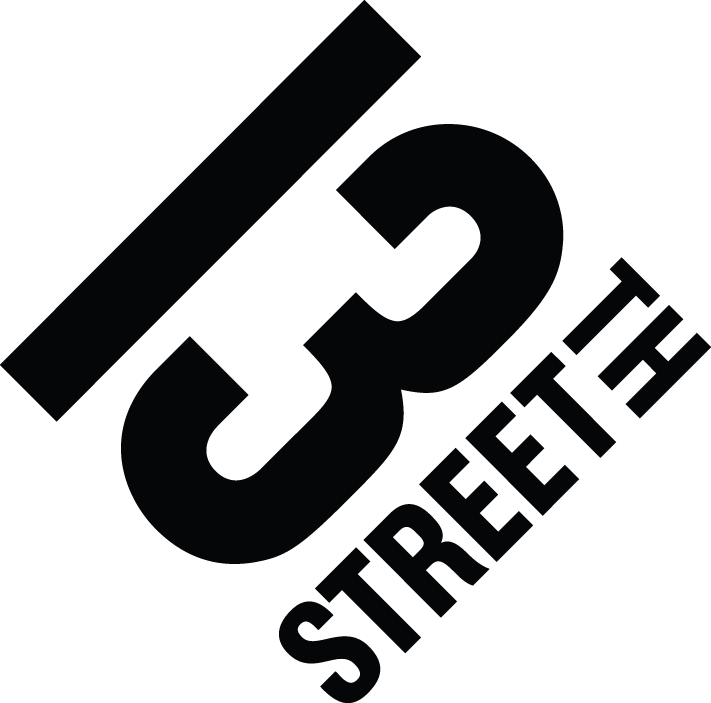
- Country: Germany
- Broadcast area: Germany, Austria, Switzerland
- Headquarters: Munich, Germany

Programming
- Language: German English
- Picture format: 1080i HDTV (downscaled to 16:9 576i for the SDTV feed)

Ownership
- Owner: Sky Deutschland
- Sister channels: Universal TV

History
- Launched: 1 May 1998; 28 years ago

Links
- Website: www.sky.de/sender/13thstreet

13th Street is a German pay television channel owned operated by Sky Deutschland. The channel is devoted to the genres thriller & crime and shows series, feature films as well as short films.

13th Street is also promotes young directors. The station awards the short film prize Shocking Shorts Award every year as part of the Munich Film Festival (Filmfest München) and has co-financed nearly 40 short films.

It was folded into Sky Deutschland operations in December 2023.

== History ==
As part of repositioning of NBC/Universal channels, 13th Street was renamed 13th Street Universal on 14 March 2011.

== Programming ==
=== Current ===
- Bull (2017–present)
- Criminal Minds (2010–present)
- FBI: Most Wanted (2021–present)
- FBI (FBI: Special Crime Unit) (2019–present)
- FBI International
- Law & Order (2004–present)
- Law & Order: Criminal Intent (Criminal Intent – Verbrechen im Visier) (2005–2012, 2023–present)
- Law & Order: Special Victims Unit (2009–2011, 2018–present)
- Law & Order Toronto: Criminal Intent (17th September)
- Law & Order: Organized Crime (2021–present)
- NCIS (Navy CIS) (2009–present)
- NCIS: Los Angeles (Navy CIS: L.A.) (2011–present)

=== Former ===
- Airwolf (2001–2002, 2004–2005)
- American Crime (2015–2017)
- Body of Proof (2017–2019)
- Broadchurch (2015, 2017)
- Cape Town (2016–2018)
- Chance (2017–2019)
- Chosen (2015–2016, 2018)
- Criminal Minds: Suspect Behavior (Criminal Minds: Team Red) (2013–2018)
- Culpa – Niemand ist ohne Schuld (2017–2023)
- Dead Again (Dead Again – Auf Mörderjagd) (2016–2017)
- Dragnet (Polizeibericht) (2006–2009)
- Gourmet Detective (Mord à la carte) (2016–2019)
- Human Trafficking (Frauenhandel – Kampf gegen das Kartell) (2014–2018)
- Intelligence (2014–2016)
- Jane Doe (Deckname Jane Doe) (2014–2018)
- Kojak (1999–2004, 2006–2009)
- Law & Order True Crime (2018–2022)
- Law & Order: Trial by Jury (2017–2021)
- McBride (Ein Fall für McBride) (2014–2018)
- Numbers (Numb3rs – Die Logik des Verbrechens) (2011–2020)
- Perry Mason (2016–2018)
- Prime Suspect (Heißer Verdacht) (2007–2010)
- Republic of Doyle (Republic of Doyle – Einsatz für zwei) (2013–2015)
- Slasher (2016–2020)
- Stonemouth (Stonemouth – Stadt ohne Gewissen) (2016–2018)
- So Help Me Todd (2023–2024)
- T. J. Hooker (2007–2008)
- Tatort (2007–2009)
- The Art of More (The Art of More – Tödliche Gier) (2016–2017)
- The Loch (Loch Ness) (2017–2020)
- Thorne (Tom Thorne) (2015–2017)

== Distribution ==
13th Street is available in Germany, Austria and Switzerland via the pay-TV package Sky as well as in Germany via the digital program offerings of cable operators Kabel Deutschland, Unitymedia, Tele Columbus and Primacom as well as the digital package of the Kabelkiosk. In addition, 13th Street can be received via the IPTV offer Telekom Entertain and Vodafone. In Switzerland, the channel can be received via the cable network operator UPC Switzerland, with numerous smaller cable network operators as well as via the program platform Teleclub, in Austria via UPC Austria and A1 TV.

Since 19 July 2011, the station broadcasts in HD standard at Kabel Deutschland, Unitymedia was unveiled on 15 March 2012. Since 17 January 2013, the HD version can be received via the Sky Deutschland platform.

== Audience share ==
=== Germany ===
	January	February	March	April	May	June	July	August	September	October	November	December	Annual average
2012	-	-	-	-	0.2%	0.2%	0.3%	0.2%	0.2%	0.3%	0.3%	0.2%	
2013	0.4%	0.4%	0.3%	0.3%	0.3%	0.4%	0.4%	0.3%	0.3%	0.3%	0.3%	0.2%	
2014	0.3%	0.3%	0.3%	0.3%	0.3%	0.2%	0.3%	0.3%	0.3%	0.3%	0.3%	0.2%	0.3%
2015	0.3%	0.3%	0.3%	0.3%	0.3%	0.3%	0.3%	0.3%	0.3%	0.3%	0.3%	0.2%	0.3%
2016	0.2%	0.2%	0.2%	0.2%	0.2%	0.2%	0.2%	0.2%	0.2%	0.2%	0.2%	0.2%	▼0.2%
2017	0.3%	0.2%	0.2%	0.3%	0.3%	0.3%	0.3%	0.3%	0.3%	0.2%	0.2%	0.3%	▲0.3%
2018	0,2%	0,2%	0,2%	0,2%	0,2%	0,2%	-	-	-	-	-	-	-
2019	0,2%	0,2%	0,2%	0,1%	0,2%	0,2%	0,2%	0,2%	0,2%	0,2%	0,2%	0,2%	0,2%
2020	0.2%	0.2%	0.2%	0.2%	0.2%	0.2%	0.2%	0.2%	0.2%	0.2%	0.2%	0.2%	0.2%
2021	0.2%	0.2%	0.2%	0.2%	0.3%	0.3%	0.2%	0.2%	0.2%	0.2%	0.2%	0.2%	0.2%
2022	0,3%	0,2%	0,2%	0,2%	0,3%	0,3%	0,3%	0,3%	0,3%	0,3%	0,4%	0,4%	▲0,3%
