= Sky Krimi =

German television channel

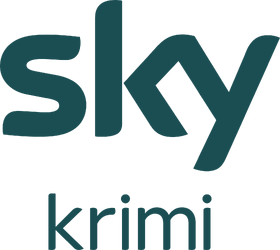
- Logo used since 2026
- Country: Germany
- Headquarters: Unterföhring, Germany

Programming
- Picture format: 1080i (16:9 HDTV)

Ownership
- Owner: Sky Deutschland
- Sister channels: List of Sky Deutschland channels

History
- Launched: 28 July 1996; 30 years ago
- Former names: Krimi & Co (1996–2002); Premiere Krimi (2002–2009)

Sky Krimi is a German television channel dedicated to crime series. It mostly features original German language productions.

It started out as Krimi & Co on the DF1 satellite platform. DF1 had several channels dedicated to specific TV-show genres, including soap channel Herz & Co and comedy channel Comedy & Co. When DF1 became Premiere World in October 1999, the sister channels were rebranded.

In May 2002, Krimi & Co became Premiere Krimi. On 4 July 2009, the channel became "Sky Krimi" and was moved back to the entertainment package from the film package.

On 1 April 2021, Sky Deutschland launched Sky Crime; which focuses mainly on true crime series.

== Programming ==
- 100 Code (2015)
- Bella Block (2004–present)
- Blochin (2016–present)
- Bordertown (2017)
- Cologne P.D. (2004–present)
- Dengler (2017–present)
- Der Bulle von Tölz (1999–2006, 2015–present)
- Der Kapitän (2004–2006, 2008–present)
- Der letzte Bulle (2017–present)
- Der letzte Zeuge (2001–present)
- Dicte (2016–present)
- Die Brücke
- Die Kumpel (2016–present)
- Die Rosenheim-Cops
- Dresden Mord (2017–present)
- Edel & Starck (2016–2017)
- Ein Fall für Zwei
- Ein Mord für Quandt (1998, 2001–2004, 2016–present)
- Ein starkes Team
- Flemming (2011–present)
- Friesland (2016–present)
- Helen Dorn (2017–present)
- HeliCops – Einsatz über Berlin (2001–2004, 2016–present)
- Ihr Auftrag, Pater Castell (2011–present)
- Inspektor Rolle (2017–present)
- Jake und McCabe
- KDD – Kriminaldauerdienst
- Kommissar Marthaler (2017–present)
- Küstenwache (2001–present)
- Leipzig Homicide (2002–present)
- Letzte Spur Berlin (2013–present)
- Kommissar Beck
- Matlock (2009–2010)
- Notruf Hafenkante (2012–present)
- The Old Fox
- R. I. S. – Die Sprache der Toten (2016–present)
- Siska (2001–present)
- SK Kölsch (2001–2006, 2015–present)
- SOKO 5113
- SOKO Rhein-Main (2008–present)
- SOKO Wismar (2005–present)
- The Fall (The Fall – Tod in Belfast) (2016–present)
- Tod eines Mädchens (2016–present)
- Wolffs Revier (1997–2006, 2016–present)

== Logo history ==
Sky Krimi logo used from 2009 to 2011.

Sky Krimi logo used from 2011 to 2016.

Sky Krimi logo used from 2016 to 2020.

Sky Krimi logo used from 2020 to 2026.

== See also ==
- Sky Crime, a crime-themed British television channel, also operated by Sky plc as a part of Sky UK's portfolio, launched in 2019.
- Sky Witness, a crime-themed British television channel operated by Sky plc as a part of its UK and Ireland portfolio, relaunched from Sky Living on 6 August 2018.
