= Bahn TV =

Television channel owned by Deutsche Bahn

- Country: Germany
- Broadcast area: Germany
- Headquarters: Berlin, Germany

Programming
- Language: German
- Picture format: 576i (4:3/16:9 SDTV)

Ownership
- Owner: Deutsche Bahn
- Key people: Volker Knauer

History
- Launched: January 2001; 24 years ago
- Closed: 31 December 2010; 14 years ago

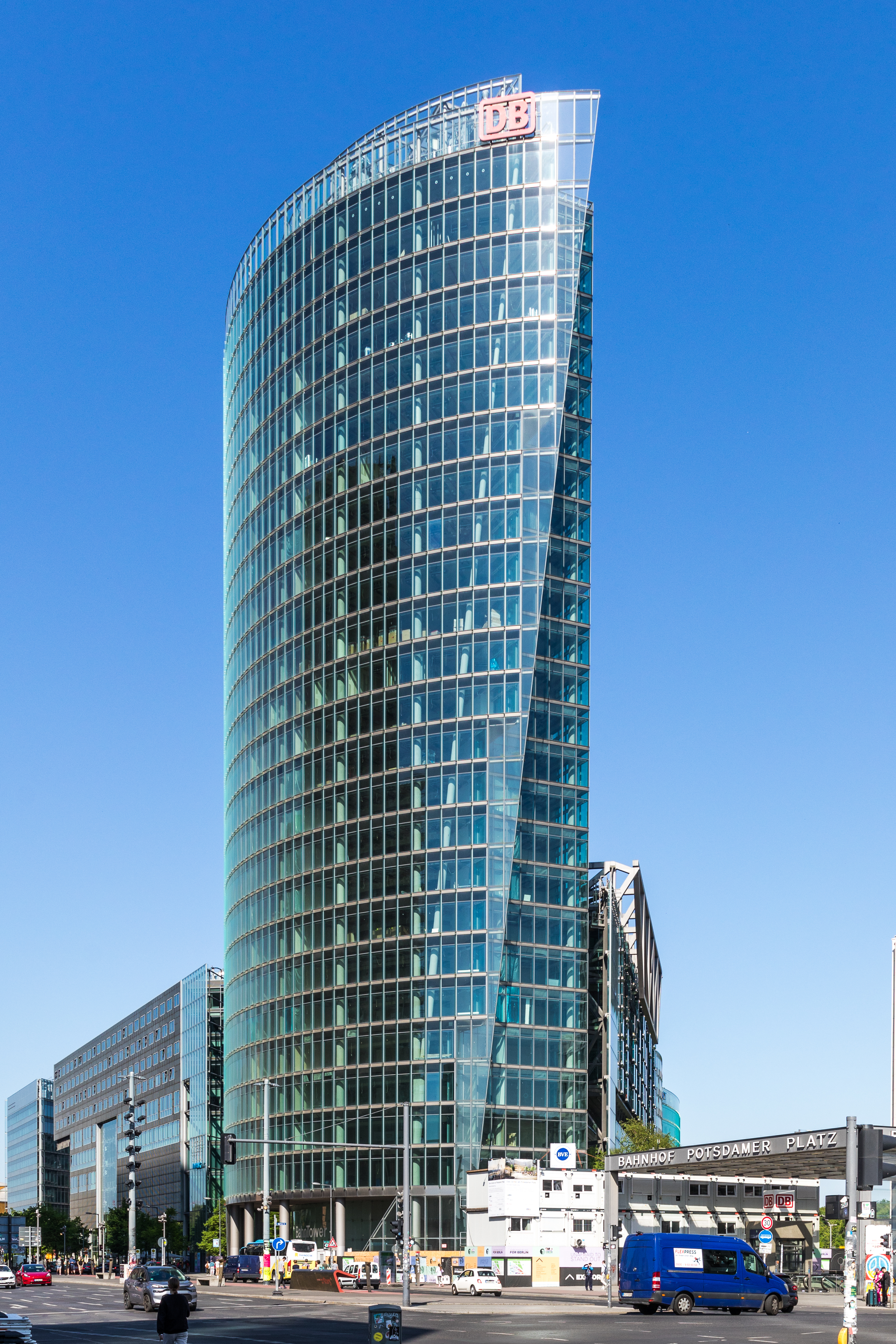
Bahn TV's studios were in "BahnTower" in Potsdamer Platz, Berlin, where DB headquarters were at the time.

Bahn TV (Rail TV) was a television channel owned by Deutsche Bahn, the German state-owned railway company. It started broadcasting in 2001 and closed on 31 December 2010. From February to 31 December 2010 the channel was called DB Bewegtbild (DB Moving Image).

== History ==
The channel launched in January 2001 as a channel for DB Group employees. Initially the channel could only be received in some Deutsche Bahn offices, break rooms and cafeterias. To broadcast content to all DB employees, the channel started broadcasting using the Astra satellite at 19.2 degrees East in early 2003.

In May 2005, the channel became a specialty channel and starting in September 2006 was promoted as a channel for DB customers, as well as a niche channel covering mobility, logistics and travel. The channel was available on cable networks from Primacom, Net Cologne, Kabel BW, Tele-Columbus AG, Unity Media, wilhelm.tel and other digital city networks.

Bahn TV was produced by Atkon AG, a television production company in Berlin. Its editorial offices were in Leipziger Platz and studios were in Potsdamer Platz. Presenters included Bettina Melzer, Jan Möller, Christine Mühlenhof, Roger pulse, Fabian Dittmann, Monika Jones, Anja Heyde and Manuela Carpenter. The executive manager, from 2009, was Volker Knauer.

Satellite broadcasts ended on 1 July 2008 and the channel was only available on the internet from then on. It was known as Bahn TV Online and had five different sections: "Aktuell" (news), "Mobilität und Logistik" (mobility and logistics), "Fernweh" (wanderlust), "Nostalgie" (nostalgia) and "In Fahrt" (~on the move). The channel was renamed "DB Bewegtbild" in February 2010 and closed at the end of 2010.

== Programs ==
- "Bahn TV-Nachrichten" - news about DB Group and mobility and industrial topics in Germany, Europe and worldwide
- "Talk Show" - talk show about business, science and culture, with DB employees and other guests
- "Bahn TV Reise" - a travel magazine about rail travel to Germany, Europe and worldwide
- "fit4life" - magazine program featuring health, fitness, nutrition and wellness. New products and services were also covered.
- "Bahn TV In Fahrt" ('Bahn TV on the move') - train rides as seen from locomotive cabs. Covered routes in Germany, and sometimes Austria and France. Additional information such as station names, geographic features near the track, tunnels and the like was also provided. The show was broadcast around midnight and was offered as a download
- "Reportage" - documentaries about the world of Deutsche Bahn
- "DB mobil TV" - a weekly magazine, DB mobil is also the name of DB's customer magazine
- "Lexikon der Mobilität" ('Mobility Encyclopedia') - topics from the world of DB
- "Bahnen der Welt" (Railways of the World) - a program about the railways in Germany and abroad. It covered trains and equipment, routes, employees and travelers, sights, landscape and history. Every last Saturday of the month, the program dealt mainly with Austria and the Austrian Federal Railways (ÖBB).
- "Zeitgeschichte" - History programming
- "Spielzug" - a magazine show about Hertha BSC, Berlin's main football club. DB has sponsored the team since 2006
