= Sky Sport (Germany) =

- Logo used since 2020
- Country: Germany
- Broadcast area: Germany; Austria; Switzerland; Liechtenstein; Luxembourg

Programming
- Picture format: 576i (16:9 SDTV); 1080i (HDTV); 2160p (UHDTV)

Ownership
- Owner: Sky Deutschland
- Sister channels: List of Sky Deutschland channels

History
- Launched: 1993
- Former names: Premiere Sport

Links
- Website: skysport.sky.de

Sky Sport is a group of sports satellite TV channels in the German language produced and broadcast by Sky Deutschland.

== History ==
=== Digitales Sport Fernsehen (Digital Sport Television) ===
Sky Sport can trace its roots back to the sports channels on the DF1 platform launched in 1996: DSF Plus, DSF Action and DSF Golf. It also has origins in the analogue Premiere channel, launched in 1993, which was also sports-focused.

=== Premiere Sport ===
On 1 October 1999, DF1 was turned into Premiere World and sport channels were rebrand on the platforms, to Premiere Sport 1 and 2. When more than two simultaneous events were available, the service could be increased to up to thirteen parallel channels.

On 26 October 2002, a service for Austria, called Premiere Austria, was launched.

=== Sky Sport ===
When Premiere became Sky Deutschland on 4 July 2009, the channels were then further rebranded to Premiere Sport 1 and 2 became Sky Sport 1 and 2, while Premiere Austria became Sky Sport Austria and Premiere HD was divided into Sky Sports HD and Sky Cinema HD. Sky Sport News HD, a sports news channel, launched on 1 December 2011 in a basic package (Sky Welt).

First Sky Sport logo

Previous Sky Sport logo

Logo since 2016 until 2020

== Channels ==
The channels that make up the Sky package broadcast from the Astra 19.2°E satellite position, using the Astra 1H, Astra 1L, and Astra 1M satellites. Channels are uplinked by Sky Italia. Between 2004 and 2016, they were uplinked by SES Platform Services (later MX1, now part of SES Video).

Channel number	Channel name	Content
200	Sky Sport News HD	Germany's only 24-hour LIVE sports news channel. Alongside news bulletins every 15 minutes, it broadcasts highlights, magazines, press conferences and trainings from Bundesliga's teams.
201	Sky Sport Top Event	
202	Sky Sport Bundesliga (1-5 bundesliga channel)	Dedicated channel for live coverage of German Bundesliga and 2. Bundesliga
203	Sky Sport F1	Dedicated channel for live coverage of F1.
204	Sky Sport Premier League	All the best of English Premier League games.
205	Sky Sport Mix	
206	Sky Sport NFL	Dedicated channel for live coverage of NFL.
207	Sky Sport Tennis	Dedicated channel for live coverage of ATP Tour, WTA Tour and grand slam tennis event.
208	Sky Sport Golf	Live coverage of the Golf events.
209	Sky Sport UHD	Selected coverage in ultra-high-definition.
210	Sky Sport Bundesliga UHD	Selected coverage in ultra-high-definition.
211	Sky Sport Bundesliga 1	Dedicated channel for live coverage of German Bundesliga and 2. Bundesliga
212	Sky Sport Bundesliga 2	Dedicated channel for live coverage of German Bundesliga and 2. Bundesliga
221	Sky Sport 1	Live coverage of the DFB-Pokal, UEFA Champions League, Tennis.
222	Sky Sport 2	Live coverage of DFB-Pokal, UEFA Champions League, Tennis, Golf and Boxing.
223	Sky Sport 3 (3-11)	Feed channel, only broadcast special sports events if necessary, or parallel sports events are happening at the same time.
231	Sky Sport Austria	Dedicated channel for live coverage of the Austrian Bundesliga.

== Programming ==
Events broadcast on the channels include German Bundesliga and 2. Bundesliga, DFB-Pokal, Austrian Bundesliga, UEFA Champions League, UEFA Europa League, UEFA Europa Conference League (until 2021 (for GER) and 2024 (for AUT)), English Premier League, golf and professional wrestling like AEW.
