= Premiere Serie =

- Country: Germany
- Broadcast area: Germany, Austria
- Headquarters: Unterföhring, Germany

Programming
- Language(s): German
- Picture format: 576i (4:3 SDTV)

Ownership
- Owner: Premiere AG

History
- Launched: 28 July 1996; 28 years ago
- Closed: 4 October 2008; 16 years ago
- Replaced by: Fox Channel
- Former names: Herz&Co (1996-1999); Sunset (1999-2002)

Premiere Serie was a German television channel which broadcast television drama series.

== History ==
It had its origins in "Herz & Co", a channel dedicated to soap operas launched in 1996 with the DF1 satellite package. When DF1 became Premiere World in 1999, the channel was rebranded and became "Sunset", a broader channel dedicated to television series.

The channel became "Premiere Serie" in its final form in 2002 when Premiere reorganized their channels. The new channel took content from both the old Sunset channel as well as Premiere Comedy and Premiere Scifi.

Many popular American drama series had their German television premiere on the channel, including Lost, Desperate Housewives and Medium.

On 4 October 2008, Premiere Serie was discontinued at 6:13 am in favor of the German version of Fox Channel. The last broadcast was Der Landarzt.

== Programming ==
Series broadcast on the channel included:

- Babylon 5 (2002–2004)
- Battlestar Galactica (2006–2008)
- Baywatch (1996–1997; 1999–2008)
- Beverly Hills, 90210 (2008)
- Brothers & Sisters (2007–2008)
- Cannon (2001–2002; 2004–2005; 2007–2008)
- Charlie’s Angels (2001–2002; 2004; 2006)
- Cheers (2002–2005; 2007–2008)
- Chicago Hope (2002)
- Criminal Minds (2006–2008)
- Dallas (2002–2005; 2007–2008)
- Deadwood (2006–2008)
- Der Landarzt (2006–2008)
- Desperate Housewives (2006)
- Dexter (2008)
- E.R. (1996–1998; 2000–2004)
- Family Law (2002)
- Fantasy Island (1997; 1999–2000; 2003–2005)
- Friends (2002–2003)
- General Hospital (1996–1999; 2001–2004)
- High Tide (2002; 2004; 2006)
- Lost (2006–2008)
- Medium (2006–2008)
- Nero Wolfe (2004–2005; 2007–2008)
- Nip/Tuck (2006–2008)
- Orleans (1998–1999; 2002)
- Rome (2006–2008)
- Seinfeld (2002–2006)
- Starsky & Hutch (2002–2006)
- Star Trek: Voyager (2002)
- Supernatural (2006–2008)
- The 4400 (2006–2008)
- The Bill Cosby Show (2006)
- The Return of Sandokan (2002; 2004–2008)
- The Sentinel (2002)
- The Sopranos (2004; 2006–2008)
- The X-Files (2002; 2006–2007)
- Twin Peaks (2002–2008)
