= Sky Deutschland =

German media company

Sky Deutschland GmbH
- Formerly: Premiere AG (1991–2009)
- Type: Subsidiary
- Industry: Mass media
- Founded: 28 February 1991; 35 years ago
- Headquarters: Unterföhring/Greater Munich, Germany
- Area served: Germany; Austria; Switzerland; Liechtenstein; Luxembourg (via cable subscription only)
- Key people: Carsten Schmidt (CEO)
- Services: Pay TV; Broadcasting; Television production Mobile app
- Revenue: €977.8 million (2010)
- Operating income: €367.6 million (2010)
- Net income: €407.5 million (2010)
- Total assets: €1.036 billion (2010)
- Total equity: €333.8 million (2010)
- Number of employees: 1,420 (FTE, 2010)
- Parent: RTL Group
- Subsidiaries: Sky Switzerland
- Website: www.sky.de

Sky Deutschland GmbH, branded as Sky, is a German media company that operates a direct broadcast satellite Pay TV platform in Germany, Austria and Switzerland (through Sky Switzerland). It provides a collection of basic and premium digital subscription television channels of different categories via satellite and cable television.

It was launched in 1991 as Premiere. The channel originally started as a single analogue channel on the Astra 1A satellite, entirely without any commercials, showing films dubbed into German, as well as in original audio, live football matches from the German Bundesliga and Austrian Bundesliga (and at one time the UEFA Cup), documentaries, concerts and TV series.

After the coming of the digital age, the service has since consisted of many channels with many new ones added over the years. On 4 July 2009, the service and its channels were rebranded as "Sky". Since 1 June 2026, Sky Deutschland is a wholly owned subsidiary of RTL Group but continues to use the Sky branding under a licensing agreement with Sky Group.

The programming service itself is provided by its subsidiary Sky Deutschland Fernsehen GmbH & Co. KG (formerly Premiere Fernsehen GmbH & Co. KG). It topped 3,000,000 subscribers by the end of 2011. As of Q2 2014, Sky Deutschland has more than 4 million subscribers.

== History ==
Premiere logo in 2006

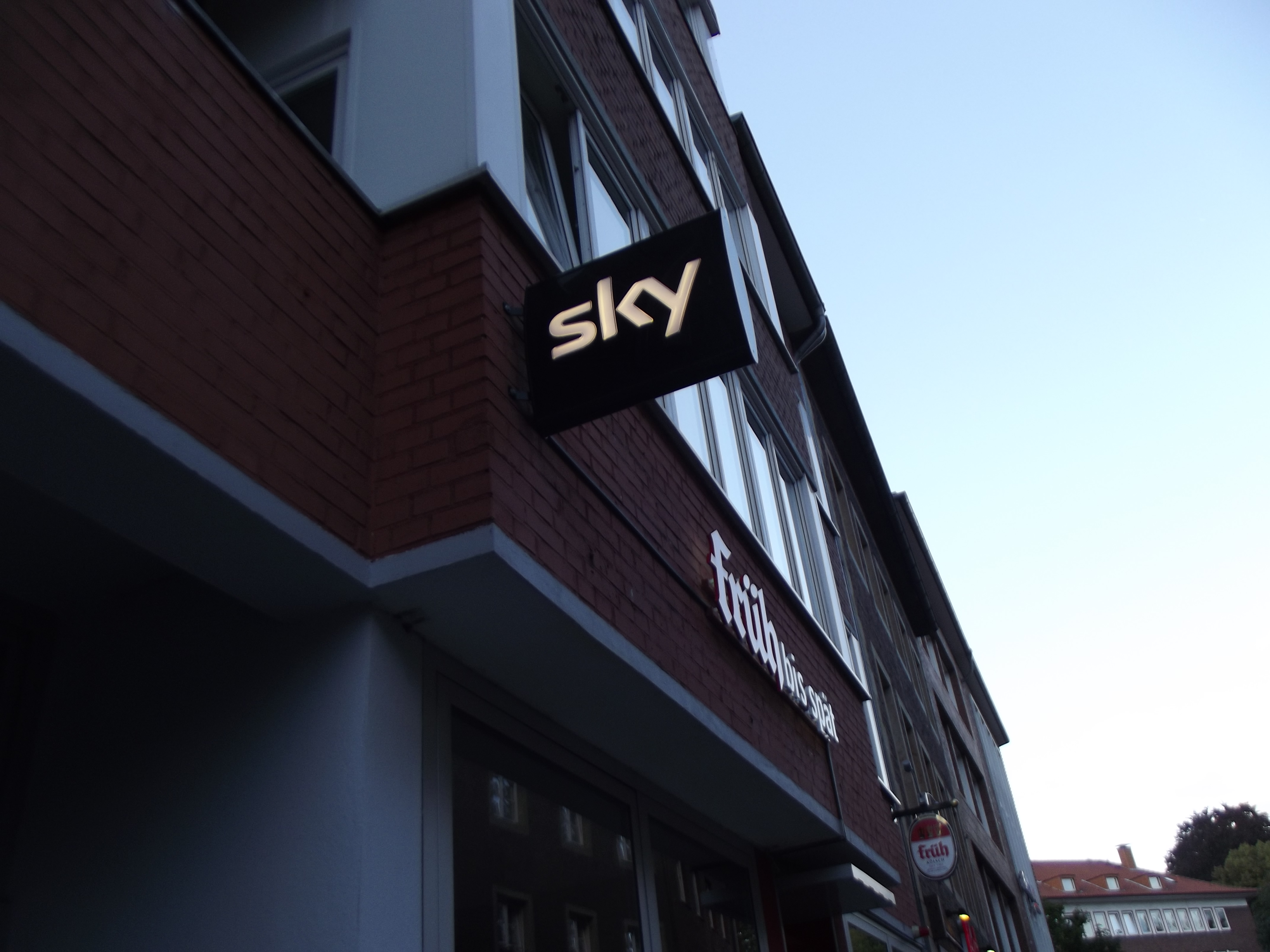
Typical illuminated Sky sign showing that a pub offers SKY TV

The German Sky has its origin in the analogue premium channel Premiere. It was owned by Kirch Group, Bertelsmann, and Canal+, and started broadcasting in 1991, having an encryption method similar to that used by Canal+ in France, Spain and Poland and needing a similar decoder.

In 1996, Kirch Media launched a digital satellite platform called DF1, which offered several different channels, including premium movie and sports channels and basically, thematic channels.

Premiere started broadcasting three digital channels in 1997, one channel mirroring the analogue channel and two showing the same content at different times. In the following years Bertelsmann and Canal+ sold their ownership of Premiere to Kirch Group leaving it as the sole owner of the service.

Premiere and DF1 merged to form Premiere World on 1 October 1999. Many of the channels offered on DF1 were carried over to Premiere World, others were rebranded or closed.

In 2002, the service became known as simply Premiere. Many of the channels were rebranded and the package structure was overhauled at the same time. At the same time, Kirch Group filed for bankruptcy, due to pay TV services in Germany failing to gain much traction, and terrestrial television in Germany having already become very robust in a shorter period of time when compared with other European regions, leaving Premiere as a pretty notorious flop.

In 2003, investment group Permira stepped in and took control of Premiere and managed to turn the service profitable in the following years. In 2005 it launched an initial public offering for €1.2 billion.

Exclusivity was for a long time a major selling point for Premiere, and most of its channels were only available through the Premiere platform. This changed in September 2007, when Premiere launched Premiere Star, a new satellite package made up of channels that were not exclusive to Premiere. The new package was called Sky Welt/Extra. The package included TNT Serie, TNT Film, Sat.1 emotions, Kabel eins Classics, AXN, Kinowelt.TV, RTL Living, RTL Crime, FOX, Syfy Universal, Animax, Disney Junior, Disney XD, Boomerang, Cartoon Network, ESPN America, Eurosport HD, Eurosport 2, National Geographic Channel, Discovery Channel, MTV Germany, MTV Live HD and Nicktoons.

Beginning in 2007 the channel broadcast TNA Wrestling on their premiere sports channels for a period of time. They broadcast regular episodes and live pay-per-views. At that time it was the only European cable television company to broadcast live TNA pay per views. It was also the only cable television company to broadcast both WWE and TNA entire programming in the same years, on the same channels.

In January 2008, News Corporation bought a 14.6% share of Premiere. News Corporation increased its shares of Premiere in the following months. On 4 July 2009, Premiere was rebranded, becoming Sky Deutschland. In conjunction with the relaunch, many channels disappeared from the platform, switched packages or were renamed. Several new channels were also added. The rebrand marked the return of News Corporation's Sky brand to Germany since the encryption of the Sky Channel (now Sky One) in 1993, apart from the availability of Sky News.

Sky also sells its services to pubs, restaurants, hotels and other establishments. The services are marketed by Sky Business.

Following News Corporation's split on 28 June 2013 to create two separate companies, 21st Century Fox (the rebranded News Corporation), and the spin-off company New News Corp, the 54.5% stake held by News Corporation in Sky Deutschland was retained by the rebranded 21st Century Fox.

Following media speculation, on 12 May 2014 Sky Deutschland's sister company, BSkyB, confirmed that it was in talks with its largest shareholder, 21st Century Fox, about acquiring Fox's 57.4% stake in Sky Deutschland and its 100% stake in Sky Italia. The enlarged company would be likely be called Sky Europe, consolidating 21st Century Fox's European digital TV assets into one company. The acquisition of the 57.4% stake was formally announced on 25 July 2014. BSkyB also made a required takeover offer to Sky Deutschland's minority shareholders. This resulted in BSkyB acquiring 89.71% of Sky Deutschland's share capital in total. The acquisitions were completed on 13 November. British Sky Broadcasting Group plc changed its name to Sky plc on 21 November 2014. On 27 November 2014 Sky plc increased its shareholding in Sky Deutschland to 90.04%, and by 2015 had bought out the remaining shareholders, de-listing the company from the Frankfurt stock exchange.

On 17 November 2016, Sky Deutschland and WWE signed a multiyear agreement to distribute WWE's premier pay-per-view events and broadcast Raw and SmackDown live on Sky Sports starting in April 2017.

In May 2017, Sky Deutschland acquired Homedia, operator of the Swiss over-the-top streaming company Hollystar. Sky subsequently launched Sky Sport as an OTT service in Switzerland, followed by an OTT entertainment service known as Sky Show in 2018. Services in Switzerland are handled by Sky Switzerland, a wholly owned subsidiary of Sky Deutschland.

In September 2017, Sky Deutschland extended its multi-year satellite capacity deal with satellite operator SES for seven transponders at the 19.2°E orbital position, confirming its long-term commitment to satellite delivery of services.

In June 2022, Sky Ticket's name was changed to "WOW".

In June 2025, RTL Group announced that it would acquire Sky Deutschland from Sky for €150 million. Following the closing of the transaction, Sky Deutschland was to become part of RTL Deutschland. In April 2026, the European Commission cleared the sale without imposing any conditions. The transaction was completed on 1 June 2026.

== Channels ==
Former Sky+ logo

The channels that make up the Sky package broadcast from the Astra 19.2°E satellite position, using the Astra 1H, Astra 1L, and Astra 1M satellites. All channels are available in SD and separate HD channels.

Sky's channels are uplinked by Sky Italia. Between 2004 and 2016, they were uplinked by SES Platform Services (later MX1, now part of SES Video); SES Video (formerly MX1) provide backup transmission services.

=== Current ===
- Sky One
- Sky Atlantic
- Sky Cinema
  - Sky Cinema Premiere
  - Sky Cinema Blockbuster
  - Sky Cinema Action
  - Sky Cinema Feelgood
  - Sky Cinema Classics
  - Sky Cinema Special
- Sky Krimi
- Sky News UK
- Sky Sport 1-14 (1 UHD channel)
  - Sky Sport Bundesliga (1–5 bundesliga channel)
  - Sky Sport F1
  - Sky Sport Golf
  - Sky Sport Mix
  - Sky Sport News
  - Sky Sport NFL
  - Sky Sport Premier League
  - Sky Sport Tennis
  - Sky Sport Top Event
- Sky Crime
- Sky Documentaries
- Sky Nature
- Sky Showcase
- Sky Sci-Fi
- Universal TV
- 13th Street

=== Defunct ===
- Sky 3D (defunct, 1 July 2017)
- Sky Info (defunct)
- Sky Sport Fanzone (defunct, 25 June 2017)
- Sky Arts (on-demand only, linear channel defunct 3 April 2019)
- Sky Select 1-10 (ad-hoc NVOD / pay-per-view channels)
- Sky Comedy (defunct, 27 September 2023)
- Sky Cinema Premieren +24, Sky Cinema Thriller and Sky Cinema Fun were closed. (defunct 11 April 2024)
- Sky Cinema Premieren was renamed Sky Cinema Premiere and Sky Cinema Best Of was renamed Sky Cinema Highlights. (defunct 11 April 2024)
- Sky Replay (defunct, 16 March 2026)

On 29 November 2018, 14 SD feeds were closed on Astra 19.2 satellite: Disney Junior, Beate-Uhse.TV, National Geographic, Discovery Channel, 13th Street, Fox, TNT Series, Syfy, NatGeo Wild, Spiegel Geschichte, Sky 1, TNT Film, Disney Cinemagic and Sky Atlantic. The SD switch-off is part of a major transponder reorganisation by Sky Deutschland on 29 November on the Astra satellite.

=== Encryption ===
VideoGuard is used as conditional access system.

== Bone conduction advertising abuse ==
In mid 2013, the company considered using bone conduction via train windows to broadcast ads to train riders.
