= List of DC Animated Universe characters =

A Justice League Unlimited promotional image showing several of the most prominent members of the DC Animated Universe.

The DC Animated Universe was a series of shows and feature-length films that aired or were released during the period from 1992 through 2006 and featured many characters from the DC Comics roster. While many characters played important or ongoing roles in the series, many more appeared only in the background. This is a list of characters appearing in the related shows and films. The information is broken down by production and sorted by original air date or release date.

== Batman: The Animated Series ==
The series debuted in 1992 and ran through 1993, and 65 original episodes, under the title Batman. The characters it used consisted of primarily of those drawn from Batman related comic books, though a few were adapted from other DC Comics series or created specifically for the show. Notably, the show created the character of Harley Quinn / Harleen Quinzel.

=== Protagonists ===
- Batman / Bruce Wayne
- Robin / Dick Grayson
- Batgirl / Barbara Gordon
- Alfred Pennyworth
- Leslie Thompkins
- James Gordon
- Harvey Bullock
- Renee Montoya

=== Additional protagonists ===
- Zatara
- Zatanna
- Jonah Hex

=== Antagonists ===
- Achilles Milo
- Arnold Stromwell
- Bane
- Catwoman
- Clayface
- Clock King
- Count Vertigo
- Crime Doctor
- Emile Dorian
- HARDAC
- Harley Quinn
- Hugo Strange
- Joker
- Josiah Wormwood
- Killer Croc
- Kyodai Ken
- Mad Hatter
- Man-Bat
- Maxie Zeus
- Mr. Freeze
- Penguin
- Poison Ivy
- Ra's al Ghul
- Red Claw
- Riddler
- Roland Daggett
- Rupert Thorne
- Scarecrow
- Sewer King
- Talia al Ghul
- Tony Zucco
- Two-Face
- Ubu
- Ventriloquist

=== Supporting and additional characters ===
- Lucius Fox
- Hamilton Hill
- Anthony Romulus
- Francine Langstrom
- Karl Rossum
- Summer Gleeson
- Gray Ghost / Simon Trent
- Tygrus
- Veronica Vreeland
- Stella Bates
- Thomas Wayne
- Martha Wayne

== Batman: Mask of the Phantasm ==
Released theatrically in 1993, Batman: Mask of the Phantasm continued the style and primary character use from Batman: The Animated Series. It also introduced a character created specifically for the film.

- Batman / Bruce Wayne
- Andrea Beaumont / The Phantasm
- Alfred Pennyworth
- James Gordon
- Harvey Bullock
- The Joker
- Veronica Vreeland

== The Adventures of Batman & Robin ==
When Batman: The Animated Series was renewed for an additional 20 episodes, it was also renamed The Adventures of Batman & Robin and featured Robin more prominently. These episodes ran from 1994 through 1995 along with reruns of the previous season. Most of the characters used had appeared in the previous season. Most of those that had not were either created specifically for the show or drawn from Batman-related comic books.

=== Protagonists ===
- Batman / Bruce Wayne
- Robin / Dick Grayson
- Batgirl / Barbara Gordon
- Alfred Pennyworth
- James Gordon
- Harvey Bullock
- Renee Montoya

=== Antagonists ===
- Baby-Doll
- Bane
- Catwoman
- Clock King
- Condiment King
- Harley Quinn
- Joker
- Killer Croc
- Lock-Up
- Mad Hatter
- Mr. Freeze
- Penguin
- Poison Ivy
- Ra's al Ghul
- Red Claw
- Riddler
- Roland Daggett
- Rupert Thorne
- Scarecrow
- Talia al Ghul
- Terrible Trio
  - Fox
  - Shark
  - Vulture
- Two-Face
- Ubu
- Ventriloquist

=== Supporting and additional characters ===
- Bat-Mite
- Lucius Fox
- Jonah Hex
- Hamilton Hill
- Karl Rossum
- Summer Gleeson
- Veronica Vreeland

== Batman & Mr. Freeze: SubZero ==
A feature-length production released directly to video in 1998, Batman & Mr. Freeze: SubZero was based on the style of Batman: The Animated Series and The Adventures of Batman & Robin. The characters used had previously appeared in those two shows.

- Batman / Bruce Wayne
- Robin / Dick Grayson
- Batgirl / Barbara Gordon
- Alfred Pennyworth
- James Gordon
- Harvey Bullock
- Renee Montoya
- Mister Freeze / Victor Fries
- Summer Gleeson
- Veronica Vreeland
- Notchka & Shaka

== Superman: The Animated Series ==
The series debuted in 1996 and ran for 54 original episodes through 2000 as an extension of the DC Animated Universe focusing on Superman. The characters it used consisted primarily of those drawn from Superman-related comic books, though characters from a number of other DC Comics series, notably The New Gods, were adapted for the show and a few were created specifically for it.

=== Protagonists ===
- Superman / Clark Kent
- Lois Lane
- Supergirl / Kara Kent
- Jimmy Olsen
- Dan Turpin
- Maggie Sawyer
- Perry White

=== Additional protagonists ===
- Abin Sur
- Alfred Pennyworth
- Aquaman
- Batman / Bruce Wayne
- Doctor Fate / Kent Nelson
- The Flash / Wally West
- Green Lantern / Kyle Rayner
- Guardians of the Universe
- Harvey Bullock
- Legion of Super-Heroes
  - Chameleon Boy
  - Cosmic Boy
  - Saturn Girl
- James Gordon
- New Gods
  - Orion
- Robin / Tim Drake
- Steel / John Henry Irons

=== Antagonists ===
- Bizarro
- Brainiac
- Bruno Mannheim
- Darkseid
- Intergang
- Jax-Ur
- Lex Luthor
- Livewire
- Luminus
- Mala
- Mercy Graves
- Metallo
- Mister Mxyzptlk
- Parasite
- Titano
- Toyman
- Volcana / Claire Selton

=== Additional antagonists ===
- Bane
- Female Furies
  - Lashina
  - Mad Harriet
  - Stompa
- Harley Quinn
- Joker
- Karkull
- Lobo
- Mad Hatter
- Maxima
- New Gods
  - DeSaad
  - Granny Goodness
  - Kalibak
  - Kanto
  - Steppenwolf
- Ra's al Ghul
- Riddler
- Sinestro
- Talia al Ghul
- Ubu
- Weather Wizard

=== Supporting and additional characters ===
- Alura
- Angela Chen
- Bibbo Bibbowski
- Ms. Gsptlsnz
- Emil Hamilton
- Inza Nelson
- Jonathan Kent
- Jor-El
- Krypto
- Lana Lang
- Lara
- Lucy Lane
- Martha Kent
- Sam Lane
- Ron Troupe

=== Unvoiced cameos ===
- Beppo
- Green Lantern Corps
  - Arkkis Chummuck
  - Arisia Rrab
  - Katma Tui
  - Kilowog
  - Larvox
  - Salaak
  - Tomar-Re
  - Xax
- Inspector Henderson
- Legion of Super-Heroes
  - Andromeda
  - Bouncing Boy
  - Brainiac 5
  - Dream Girl
  - Kid Quantum
  - Light Lass
  - Lightning Lad
  - Phantom Girl
  - Triplicate Girl
  - Ultra Boy
- New Gods
  - Big Barda
  - Black Racer
  - Forager
  - Highfather
  - Lightray
  - Mister Miracle
- Pete Ross
- Starro

== The New Batman Adventures ==
The New Batman Adventures debuted in 1997 as a continuation of Batman: The Animated Series and The Adventures of Batman & Robin. It ran through 1999 with 24 original episodes. Most of the characters who appeared were carried over from the previous series. Additional characters were added, with most of them being drawn from a wider range of DC Comics comic books. The odd character was created specifically for the show or borrowed from its sister show Superman: The Animated Series.

=== Protagonists ===
- Batman / Bruce Wayne
- Robin / Tim Drake
- Nightwing / Dick Grayson
- Batgirl / Barbara Gordon
- Alfred Pennyworth
- James Gordon
- Creeper / Jack Ryder
- Harvey Bullock
- Renee Montoya

=== Antagonists ===
- Baby-Doll
- Bane
- Calendar Girl
- Catwoman
- Clayface
- Firefly
- Harley Quinn
- Joker
- Killer Croc
- Mad Hatter
- Mister Freeze
- Penguin
- Poison Ivy
- Riddler
- Roxy Rocket
- Scarecrow
- Thomas Blake
- Two-Face
- Ventriloquist

=== Additional protagonists and antagonists ===
- Carrie Kelley
- Etrigan / Jason Blood
- Supergirl / Kara In-Ze
- Klarion the Witch Boy
- Livewire / Leslie Willis

=== Supporting characters ===
- Lucius Fox
- Hamilton Hill
- Summer Gleeson
- Veronica Vreeland

=== Unvoiced cameos ===
- Francine Langstrom
- Kirk Langstrom
- Leslie Tompkins

== Batman Beyond ==
Running from 1999 through 2001, Batman Beyond was a spin-off of the other DC Animated Universe Batman shows set 20 years in the future. Over its run, 52 original episodes aired featuring a handful of characters carried forward from the previous shows. Most of the characters that rounded out the shows were created specifically for the show either wholly or as "20 year later" reinterpretations of then current DC Comics characters.

=== Protagonists ===
- Batman / Terry McGinnis
- Bruce Wayne
- Ace the Bat-Hound
- Barbara Gordon
- Max Gibson

=== Antagonists ===
- Big Time / Charles Bigelow
- Derek Powers / Blight
- Curaré
- False-Face
- Inque
- Jokerz
- Kobra
- Mister Freeze / Victor Fries
- Bane
- Ma Mayhem
- Mad Stan
- Royal Flush Gang
  - Ace
  - Jack
  - King
  - Queen
  - Ten
- Ra's al Ghul
- Shriek
- Spellbinder / Ira Billings
- Stalker
- Starro
- Talia al Ghul
- Willie Watt

=== Supporting and additional characters ===
- Aquagirl / Mareena
- Bane
- Big Barda
- Bobbi "Blade" Sommer
- Bunny Vreeland
- Chelsea Cunningham
- Dana Tan
- Kai-ro
- Nicole
- Mary McGinnis
- Matt McGinnis
- Nelson Nash
- Warren McGinnis
- Micron
- Summer Gleeson
- Superman
- Warhawk

==== The Zeta Project pilot episode characters ====
- Zeta
- Ro Rowan
- James Bennet
- Agent Lee
- Agent West

== Gotham Girls ==
In 2000 Gotham Girls was launched as a web-toon featuring some of the characters used in The New Batman Adventures but from the perspective of three female villains. The episodes were posted through 2003.

=== Protagonists ===
- Catwoman
- Harley Quinn
- Poison Ivy

=== Antagonists ===
- Batgirl
- James Gordon
- Renee Montoya
- Dora Smithy

== Lobo ==
In 2000, Lobo was launched as a web-toon featuring Lobo who appeared in Superman: The Animated Series. The episodes were posted throughout the same year. Unlike the other entries, it is completely adult-oriented with prominent graphic violence, profanity and sexual content.

=== Protagonists ===
- Lobo
- Darlene Spritzer

=== Antagonists ===
- Sunny Jim
- Tubo
- Fat Whutzat
- Mudboy
- Snake

== Static Shock ==
Debuting in 2000 and running through 2004 with 52 original episodes, Static Shock featured the character Static. Prominent characters in the series were derived from, or very loosely based on, characters created by Milestone Media for comics published through DC Comics. Later episodes bring the series into the DC Animated Universe with the appearance of characters from the other shows.

=== Protagonists ===
- Static / Virgil Hawkins
- Gear / Richie Foley

=== Antagonists ===
- Aqua-Maria
- Boom
- Carmen Dillo
- D-Struct / Derek Barnett
- Ebon / Ivan Evans
- Edwin Alva
- Ferret
- Hot-Streak / Francis Stone
- Kangor
- Madelyn Spaulding
- Shiv
- Specs
- Talon
- Tamara Lawrence
- Trapper

=== Supporting and additional characters ===
- Anansi
- Batman / Bruce Wayne
- Batman / Terry McGinnis
- Brainiac
- The Flash
- Green Lantern / John Stewart
- Harley Quinn
- Harvey Bullock
- Hawkgirl / Shayera Hol
- James Gordon
- The Joker
- Jokerz
- Kobra
- Martian Manhunter
- Poison Ivy
- Robin / Tim Drake
- Rubberband Man
- Sharon Hawkins
- She-Bang
- Sinestro
- Soul Power
- Sparky
- Superman
- Toyman

== Batman Beyond: Return of the Joker ==
A feature-length production released directly to video in 2000, Batman Beyond: Return of the Joker was based on the style of Batman Beyond. The characters used had previously appeared in the various shows.

- Batman / Bruce Wayne
- Batman / Terry McGinnis
- Ace the Bat-Hound
- Batgirl / Barbara Gordon
- Robin / Tim Drake / Joker Jr.
- Chelsea Cunningham
- Dana Tan
- Mary McGinnis
- Matt McGinnis
- The Joker
- Harley Quinn / Harleen Quinzel
- Jokerz
  - Bonk
  - Chucko
  - Dee Dee
  - Ghoul
  - Woof
- Jordan Pryce
- Amy

== The Zeta Project ==
Debuting in 2001 and running through 2002 with 26 original episodes, The Zeta Project was a spin-off show from Batman Beyond and featured mostly original characters.

=== Protagonists ===
- Zeta
- Ro Rowan
- Agent Lee
- Bucky Buenaventura

=== Antagonists ===
- James Bennet
- IU7 (Infiltration Unit Seven)
- Agent West

=== Additional characters ===
- Batman / Terry McGinnis
- Bruce Wayne

== Justice League ==
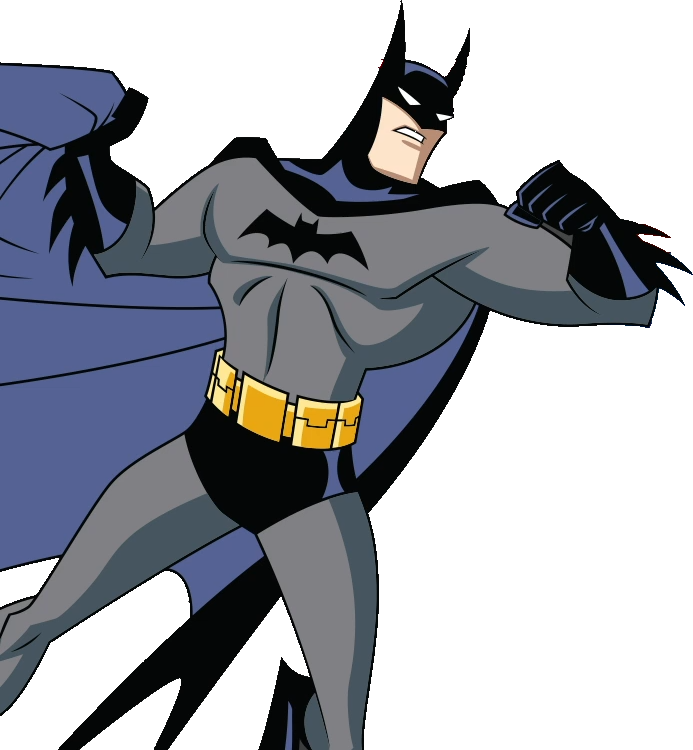
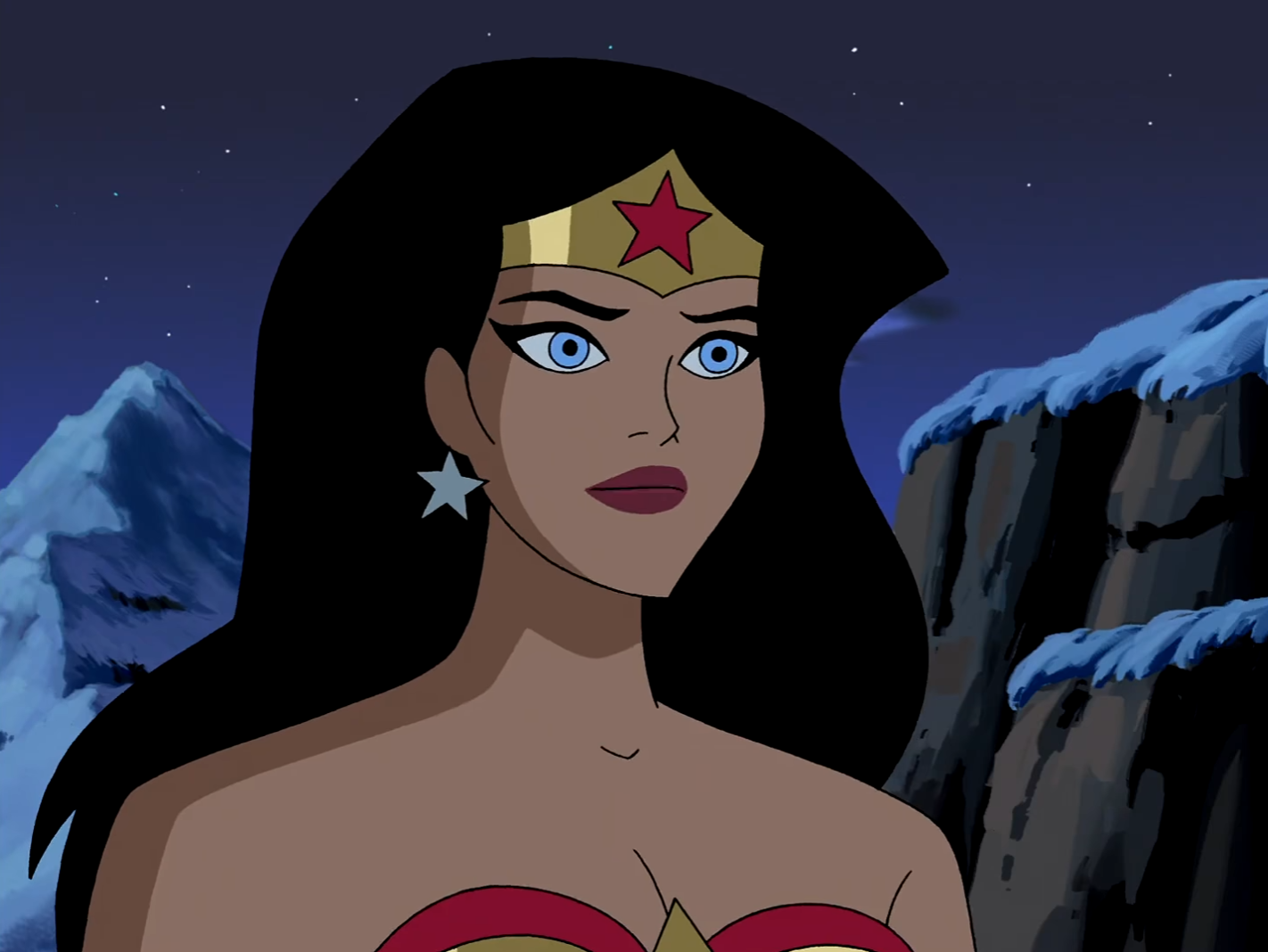
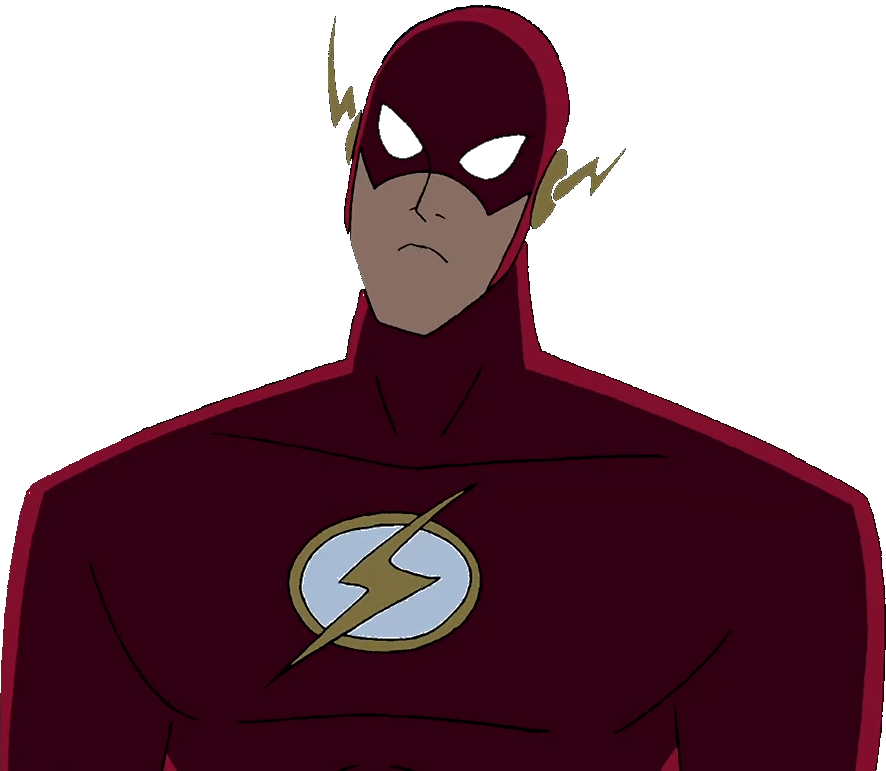
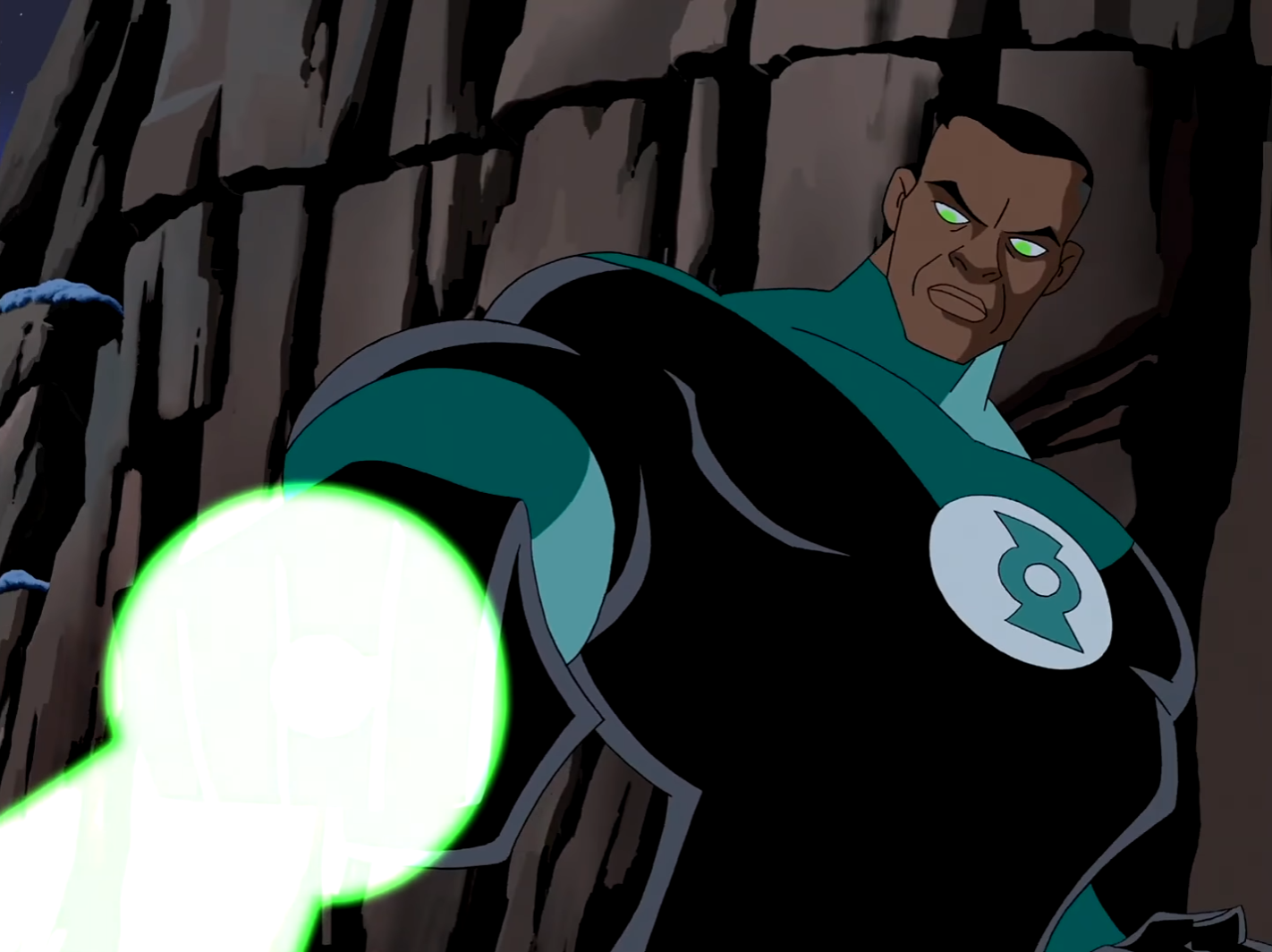
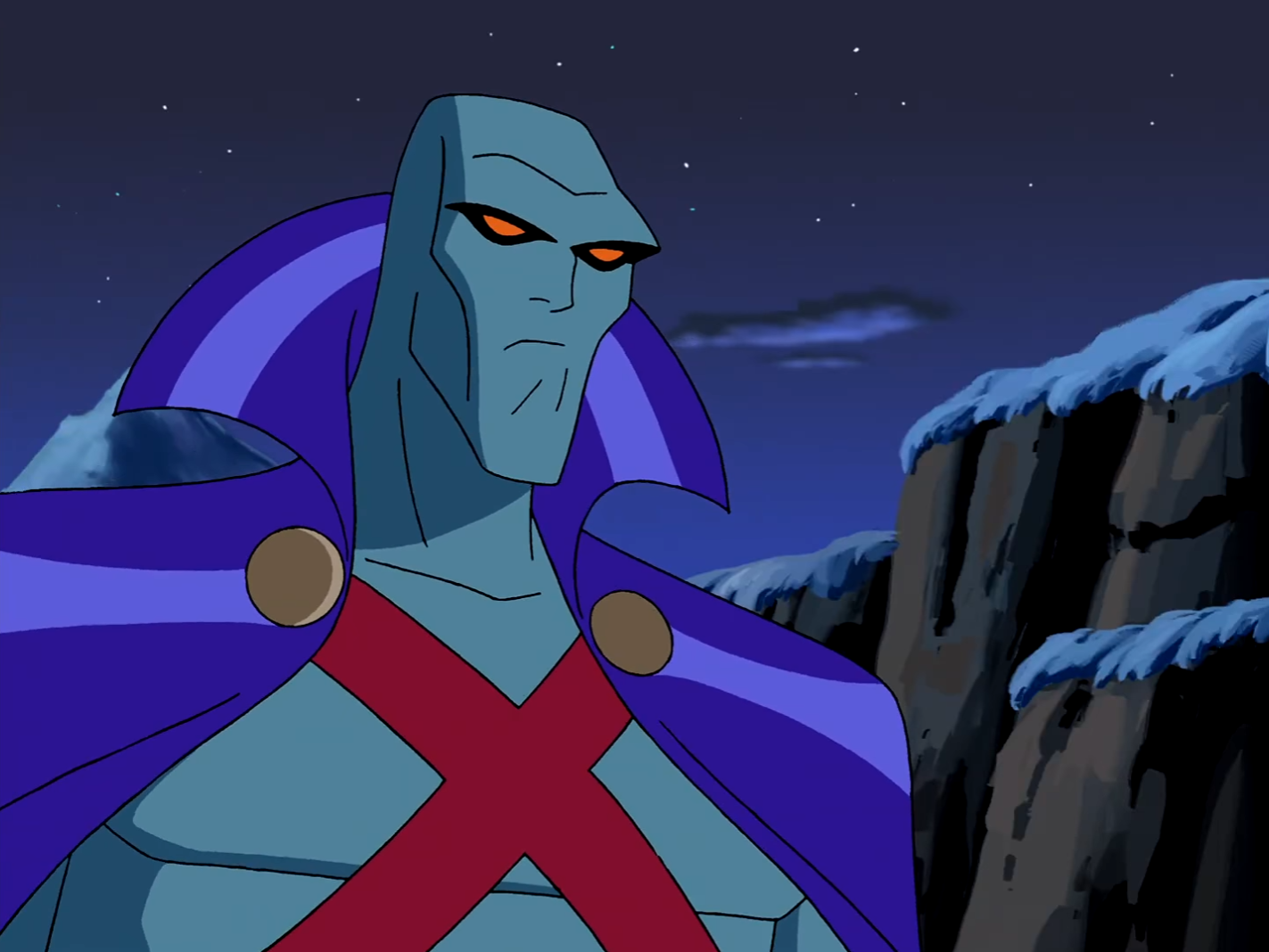
From top to bottom: Batman, Wonder Woman, The Flash, Green Lantern and Martian Manhunter as depicted in the series

Debuting in 2001, Justice League was a continuation of the continuity established in the various Batman and Superman related shows that had aired since 1992. The show ran through 2004, airing 52 original episodes. The characters were drawn from those that had appeared in previous series with additional characters being based on those from DC Comics comic books.

=== Protagonists ===
- Superman / Kal-El / Clark Kent
- Batman / Bruce Wayne
- Wonder Woman / Princess Diana
- The Flash / Wally West
- Green Lantern / John Stewart
- Martian Manhunter / J'onn J'onnz
- Hawkgirl / Shayera Hol

=== Additional protagonists ===
- Alfred Pennyworth
- Aquaman
- Blackhawks
  - Blackhawk
  - Andre Black-Dumont
  - Hans Hendrickson
  - Olaf Friedriksen
- Doctor Fate / Kent Nelson
- Easy Company
  - Sgt. Rock
  - Bulldozer
  - Ice Cream Soldier
  - Wildman
- Etrigan / Jason Blood
- Green Lantern Corps
  - Arkkis Chummuck
  - Galius Zed
  - Katma Tui
  - Kilowog
- Guardians of the Universe
- Jimmy Olsen
- Lobo
- Lois Lane
- Mera
- Metamorpho
- Merlin
- New Gods
  - Forager
  - Highfather
  - Orion
  - Lightray
- Steve Trevor

=== Antagonists ===
- Amazo
- Aresia
- Brainiac
- Cheetah
- Clayface
- Copperhead
- Deadshot
- Despero
- Doctor Destiny
- Doomsday
- Draaga
- Eclipso
- Felix Faust
- Firefly
- Giganta
- Gorilla Grodd
- Hades
- Harley Quinn
- Hro Talak
- Java
- Joker
- Kanjar Ro
- Killer Frost
- Lex Luthor
- Livewire
- Luminus
- Mongul
- Manhunters
- Mercy Graves
- Metallo
- Mordred
- Morgan Edge
- Morgaine le Fey
- New Gods
  - DeSaad
  - Darkseid
  - Glorious Godfrey
  - Kalibak
  - Steppenwolf
- Orm
- Parasite
- Poison Ivy
- The Royal Flush Gang
  - Ace
  - Jack
  - King
  - Queen
  - Ten
- Shade
- Simon Stagg
- Sinestro
- Solomon Grundy
- Star Sapphire
- Toyman
- Tsukuri
- Ultra-Humanite
- Vandal Savage
- Volcana
- Weather Wizard

==== Teams ====
During the series various characters operated as teams in some episodes. In some cases the characters making up the team only appeared as part of that team, so the grouping is noted in the above list. In other cases the characters were not exclusive to the team. The teams that fall into this category are:

- Injustice Gang
  - A version appeared in the episode "Injustice For All" consisting of : Cheetah, Copperhead, Joker, Lex Luthor, Shade, Solomon Grundy, Star Sapphire, and Ultra-Humanite.
  - A second version appeared in the episode "Fury" consisting of: Aresia, Copperhead, Shade, Solomon Grundy, Star Sapphire, and Tsukuri.
- Superman Revenge Squad
  - Appeared in the episode "Hereafter, Part I" consisting of: Kalibak, Livewire, Metallo, Toyman, and Weather Wizard.
- The Secret Society
  - Appeared in the episode "Secret Society" and consisted of: Clayface, Giganta, Gorilla Grodd, Killer Frost, Parasite, Shade, and Sinestro.

=== Supporting and additional characters ===
- Hippolyta
- Inza Nelson
- Jonathan Kent
- Martha Kent
- Philippus
- Sapphire Stagg
- Snapper Carr
- Solovar

=== Unvoiced cameos ===
- Arnold Wesker / The Ventriloquist
- Arthur Ivo
- Bibbo
- Barbara Gordon
- Cassandra Cain
- Dick Grayson
- Green Lantern Corps
  - Larvox
  - Tomar-Re
- Lana Lang
- Lara
- Harvey Dent / Two-Face
- New Gods
  - Forever People
    - Beautiful Dreamer
    - Big Bear
    - Mark Moonrider
    - Serifan
    - Vykin
  - Mister Miracle / Scott Free
- Natasha Irons
- Perry White
- Ron Troupe
- Summer Gleeson
- Kara In-Ze
- Tim Drake

=== Pastiches ===
The two-part episode "Legends" featured pastiches of the Justice Society of America, the Justice Guild of America, and a selection of their villains. The pastiche was used in lieu of the actual characters at the insistence of DC Comics.

- Black Siren (Black Canary)
- Cat Man (Wildcat)
- Green Guardsman (Green Lantern / Alan Scott)
- The Streak (The Flash / Jay Garrick)
- Tom Turbine (The Atom / Al Pratt)
- Doctor Blizzard (Icicle)
- Music Master (Fiddler)
- Ray Thompson (The Brainwave)
- Sir Swami (The Wizard)
- Sportsman (Sportsmaster)

The two-part episode "A Better World" featured a variation of the Crime Syndicate of America called the Justice Lords. The pastiche was used as the writers worked on the episode, replacing the standard Crime Syndicate with a Justice League went fascist.

- Lord Batman (Owlman)
- Lord Green Lantern (Power Ring)
- Lord Hawkgirl
- Lord Martian Manhunter
- Lord Wonder Woman (Superwoman)
- Lord Superman (Ultraman)

== Batman: Mystery of the Batwoman ==
A feature-length production released directly to video in 2003, Batman: Mystery of the Batwoman was based on the style of The New Batman Adventures. With the exception of the titular "Batwoman", the characters used had previously appeared in the various shows.

- Batman / Bruce Wayne
- Robin / Tim Drake
- Barbara Gordon
- Alfred Pennyworth
- James Gordon
- Harvey Bullock
- Batwoman / Sonia Alcana / Kathy Duquesne / Rocky Ballantine
- Bane
- The Penguin / Oswald Cobblepot
- Rupert Thorne

== Justice League Unlimited ==
When it was renewed for a third season in 2004, Justice League was retitled Justice League Unlimited. The show ran through 2006, airing an additional 39 original episodes. Most of the characters were carried over with additional ones being based on those from DC Comics comic books.

=== Protagonists ===
- Superman / Clark Kent
- Batman / Bruce Wayne
- Wonder Woman / Princess Diana
- The Flash / Wally West
- Green Lantern / John Stewart
- Martian Manhunter / John Jones
- Hawkgirl / Shayera Hol

==== Additional League members ====
- Aquaman
- Atom
- Atom Smasher
- Aztek
- B'wana Beast
- Black Canary
- Blue Devil
- Booster Gold
- Captain Atom
- Captain Marvel
- Commander Steel
- Crimson Avenger
- Doctor Fate / Kent Nelson
- Doctor Light (Kimiyo Hoshi)
- Dove
- Elongated Man
- Etrigan / Jason Blood
- Fire
- Huntress (Helena Bertinelli)
- Green Arrow
- Hawk
- Mister Terrific
- Orion
- Question
- Red Tornado
- Shining Knight (Sir Justin)
- Speedy
- Stargirl
- Steel
- S.T.R.I.P.E.
- Supergirl
- Vigilante
- Vixen
- Wildcat (Ted Grant)
- Zatanna

Unvoiced League members

- Creeper
- Crimson Fox
- Doctor Mid-Nite
- Gypsy
- Hourman
- Ice
- Johnny Thunder
- Metamorpho
- Nemesis
- Obsidian
- Ray
- Rocket Red
- Sand
- Starman
- Vibe
- Waverider

=== Additional protagonists ===
- Andrea Beaumont / The Phantasm
- Aquagirl / Marina
- Bat Lash
- Batman / Terry McGinnis
- Chuck Sirianni
- Deadman
- El Diablo
- Green Lantern (Hal Jordan)
- Green Lantern (Kai-Ro)
- Guardians of the Universe
- Hawkman / Carter Hall
- Jennifer Morgan
- Jonah Hex
- King Faraday
- Legion of Super-Heroes
  - Bouncing Boy
  - Brainiac 5
  - Phantom Girl
- Machiste
- Micron
- New Gods
  - Big Barda
  - Metron
  - Mister Miracle
  - Oberon
- Pow Wow Smith
- Shakira
- Spy Smasher
- Static / Virgil Hawkins
- Warlord
- Warhawk / Rex Stewart

=== Antagonists ===
The antagonists for this series break down into three types based on season and story arc. The first season had a set of episodes linked by an arc focusing on a secret government agency trying to control the Justice League. The second season had a set linked by an arc focusing on an expanded Secret Society. Both seasons also had episodes that did not tie to the arcs. The general antagonists are listed first.

- Ares
- Atomic Skull
- Bizarro
- Blockbuster
- Captain Boomerang
- Captain Cold
- Cheetah
- Chronos
- Circe
- Copperhead
- Deimos
- Demons Three
- Dreamslayer
- Fatal Five
  - Emerald Empress
  - Mano
  - Persuader
  - Tharok
  - Validus
- Felix Faust
- Gentleman Ghost
- Giganta
- Gorgon
- Hades
- Hath-Set
- Jokerz
  - Bonk
  - Chucko
  - Dee Dee
  - Ghoul
  - Woof
- Lex Luthor
- Lord Havok
- Mercy Graves
- Mirror Master
- Mongul
- Mordred
- Morgaine le Fey
- New Gods
  - Darkseid
  - Female Furies
    - Bernadeth
    - Lashina (unvoiced)
    - Mad Harriet (unvoiced)
    - Stompa (unvoiced)
  - Granny Goodness
  - Kalibak
  - Kanto
  - Mantis
  - Virman Vundabar
- The Royal Flush Gang
  - Ace
  - Jack (unvoiced)
  - King (unvoiced)
  - Queen (unvoiced)
  - Ten (unvoiced)
- Roulette
- Shadow Thief
- Tobias Manning
- Trickster

==== Unvoiced antagonist cameos ====
- Abra Kadabra
- Black Mass
- Bloodsport
- Brimstone
- Captain Nazi
- Crowbar
- Doctor Alchemy
- Electrocutioner
- Evil Star
- Fiddler
- Fastball
- Inque
- KGBeast
- Hellgrammite
- Hellhound
- Mister Element
- The Parasite / Rudy Jones
- The Pied Piper
- Sportsmaster
- Shatterfist
- Shriek / Walter Shreeve
- Stalker
- Top
- Tracer
- Turtle

==== "Cadmus" arc ====
- Achilles Milo
- Amanda Waller
- Brainiac
- Doctor Moon
- Doomsday
- Emil Hamilton
- Hugo Strange (unvoiced cameo)
- Galatea
- Lex Luthor
- Maxwell Lord
- Tala
- General Wade Eiling
- Task Force X
  - Captain Boomerang
  - Clock King
  - Deadshot
  - Plastique
  - Rick Flag

==== "Secret Society" arc ====
- Angle Man
- Atomic Skull
- Bizarro
- Devil Ray
- Doctor Polaris
- Evil Star
- Gentleman Ghost
- Giganta
- Goldface
- Gorilla Grodd
- Heat Wave
- Key
- Killer Frost
- Lex Luthor
- Metallo
- Mirror Master
- Rampage
- Silver Banshee
- Sonar
- Sinestro
- Star Sapphire
- Tala
- Toyman
- Weather Wizard

===== Unvoiced arc cameos =====
- Black Mass
- Blockbuster
- Cheetah
- Copperhead
- Doctor Cyber
- Doctor Destiny
- Doctor Spectro
- Dummy
- Javelin
- KGBeast
- Lady Lunar
- Livewire
- Major Disaster
- Merlyn
- The Monocle
- Neutron
- Parasite
- Psycho-Pirate
- Puppeteer
- Puzzler
- Queen Bee
- Shade
- Shark
- Tattooed Man
- Thinker
- Top
- Tsukuri
- Volcana

=== Supporting and additional characters ===
- Dana Tan
- Hermes
- Hephaestus
- Inza Nelson
- Jonathan Kent
- Jor-El
- Lois Lane
- Queen Hippolyta
- Rama Kushna

=== Unvoiced cameos ===
- Ace the Bat-Hound
- Green Lantern Corps
  - Chaselon
  - K'ryssma
  - Katma Tui
  - Kilowog
  - Palaqua
  - Spol
  - Stel
- Jimmy Olsen
- Krypto
- Legion of Super-Heroes
  - Blok
  - Chameleon Boy
  - Colossal Boy
  - Cosmic Boy
  - Lightning Lad
  - Saturn Girl
  - Shadow Lass
  - Timber Wolf
  - Ultra Boy
  - Wildfire
- Lightray
- Maggie Sawyer
- Martha Wayne
- Mary McGinnis
- Matt McGinnis
- Mordru
- Nightwing / Dick Grayson
- Perry White
- Ron Troupe
- Snapper Carr
- Summer Gleeson
- Warren McGinnis

=== Pastiches ===
The episode "Double Date" featured a crime lord as the primary antagonist that was a mix of two DC Comics characters. The character was called Steven Mandragora, but did not visually resemble that character. The appearance was based on Tobias Whale.

The episode "Ultimatum" featured the Ultimen, pastiches of characters created specifically for Hana-Barbara's Super Friends series.

- Downpour (Zan)
- Juice (Black Vulcan)
- Shifter (Jayna)
- Wind Dragon (Samurai)
- Longshadow (Apache Chief)

== Restricted characters ==
A few characters have been cited by writers and producers as "off-limits" at various times during the production of the various shows, though they are allowed to appear in the comics based on the show.

=== Adam Strange ===
Adam Strange was originally supposed to appear in "Hunter's Moon", but legal rights prevented that from happening. The episode's original title was "Mystery In Space", the name of the comic that Strange starred in.

=== Aquaman and Black Manta ===
Characters from Aquaman comics could not appear due to character rights being reserved for a potential live-action series. This resulted in Black Manta being renamed Devil Ray for the series, with the character first appearing in an episode that was intended to feature Aquaman.

=== Batman-related characters ===
Most characters from the Batman comics also could not appear due to the "Bat-Embargo" that reserved those characters for use in other media. This left only Batman available to be prominently used in Justice League and Justice League Unlimited.

This resulted in a partial rewrite of the episode "Double Date". Originally, Barbara Gordon was to appear in the episode. The episode would have her getting injured during a case as Batgirl. Since Bruce forbids her from participating she would recreate herself as Oracle, and get in touch with Black Canary and Huntress to finish her case. Neither of them would meet her in person. Due to the Bat-Embargo, the story replaced Batgirl with Green Arrow and the Question.

Some non-speaking and quick cameos did make it in to a few episodes though:

- Alternate versions of Dick Grayson, Barbara Gordon, Tim Drake, and Cassandra Cain make brief appearances in the three part "The Savage Time". Drake also makes a brief cameo in "Hereafter" attending Superman's funeral.
- Several characters from Batman's supporting cast and rogues' gallery appear in the former series; Alfred Pennyworth, Firefly, Clayface, Harley Quinn and the Joker all appear at least once. In addition, alternate versions of Joker, Two-Face, Poison Ivy, Ventriloquist, and Scarface are seen in the episode "A Better World".
- Temple Fugate, otherwise known as the Clock King, appears as a member of Task Force X.
- Hugo Strange briefly appears as a member of Project Cadmus.
- Nightwing makes a fleeting appearance as a silhouette atop a building in Blüdhaven in the episode "Grudge Match".

=== Batwoman (Kathy Kane) ===
Kathy Kane, the original Silver Age Batwoman, could not appear as one of the three women to don the costume of Batwoman in Batman: Mystery of the Batwoman. According to the featurette included in the DVD release, Alan Burnett explains they had intended to use the name "Kathy Kane" but were asked to change it by DC Comics, thanks to some morally gray actions on the part of the movie Batwoman. This resulted in the character of Kathy Duquesne being created for the show. However, not much later, a new Batwoman debuted in the new DC continuity, being portrayed as a lesbian. The film features a near-identical character named Sonia Alcana.

=== Black Lightning ===
Black Lightning could not appear within the shows due to DC Comics' refusal to pay royalties to his creator, Jenny Blake Isabella. This resulted in the character Black Vulcan being created for the show Super Friends. The character Juice is a pastiche of Black Vulcan, as is Soul Power in Static Shock.

This also affected the characters connected to Black Lightning and also created by Isabella. The original idea for "Double Date" was for Tobias Whale to be the man who murdered Huntress's parents. He was replaced with a villain called Steven Mandragora, whose last name was later used for the man who arranged their deaths in the comic book Huntress: Year One.

=== Blue Beetle ===
Blue Beetle could not appear as a member of the Justice League due to rights being tied up until 2007 because of his 1940s radio show and 1980s cartoon proposals.

=== Captain Marvel ===
When the Justice League episode, "Hereafter" was being produced, Captain Marvel was set to appear as the temporary 7th member. As the rights to the character and the Marvel Family were unavailable to the show, Lobo took the position instead. Later in the episode, it was shown that Aquaman had become the 7th member. However, Captain Marvel would later appear in "Clash."

=== Firestorm ===
Firestorm was intended to appear, but the writers were unable to create a plot featuring him.

=== Legion of Doom ===
While the production team regularly referred to the collection of villains joining forces in the final major arc of Justice League Unlimited as the "Legion of Doom", DC resisted the use of the term within the show itself.

=== Plastic Man ===
Plastic Man was stated by Dwayne McDuffie to be unusable in the show despite being mentioned as a League member by John Stewart in one episode, but he did not explain why.

=== Phantom Stranger ===
Bruce Timm had intended to utilize the Phantom Stranger in the DC Animated Universe, but was not allowed to do so for unknown reasons.

=== Teen Titans ===
The Teen Titans and related characters were off-limits due to the eponymous series. Green Arrow's sidekick Speedy appears in the episode "Patriot Act", which aired following the finale of Teen Titans.

=== Vertigo characters ===
Sandman and other Vertigo characters were said by Bruce Timm in a Wizard interview to be considered, featuring an appearance of Neil Gaiman's Sandman character, but they weren't sure how to incorporate it into the tone of the franchise. He went on to say "But now, it's not even an issue. The whole Vertigo universe is closed off for us." In the same interview, Bruce Timm also states that they did attempt to use the Phantom Stranger and the Spectre but were told they could not use those characters.

Neil Gaiman once said: "I always loved the idea of doing a Sandman/Batman Animated cartoon episode, and we were definitely talking about it in '93, after Vertigo came into existence...I'd assumed that they lost interest. But there was definitely some kind of Vertigo/DC divide that came into existence in there somewhere, imposed from DC/Vertigo editorial and above, worried, I was told, that a kid would feel pressured by continuity to pick up a 'For Mature Readers' title and the world would end."

== Canceled characters ==
A few characters were developed by writers and producers during the production of the various shows; however, they ultimately did not appear in any episodes or films.

=== Cyborgirl and Impulse ===
When Justice League was pitched to the Kids' WB network, the lineup originally included three young members as proteges for the League. The members would have been Robin, Impulse, and an original character described as a "teenage female version of Cyborg" (Cyborgirl). The promo, which is viewable on the fourth disc of the Justice League Season 1 boxset, is the only appearance of Cyborgirl and Impulse in the DC Animated Universe.

=== Nightshade ===
When plans for a Justice League series were originally in development in the late 1990s, Nightshade was included in a roster of prospective Justice League members by producer Bruce Timm. Plans for the original series were canceled and production moved onto Superman: The Animated Series. She did not make into the Justice League series once it entered production.

=== Nocturna ===
Nocturna was scheduled to appear in an episode of Batman: The Animated Series as a vampire, but the episode was canceled after Fox censors objected to the storyline, which would have involved Batman being turned into a vampire and craving human blood.
