= Convergence (comics) =

2015 DC Comics story arc

- Cover of Convergence hardcover, art by Ethan Van Sciver
- Publisher: DC Comics
- Publication date: April – May 2015
- Genre: Superhero
Title(s)
Convergence #0 and #1–8
- Main character(s): Batman; Superman; Wonder Woman; Brainiac; Telos

Creative team
- Writer(s): Jeff King; Scott Lobdell; Dan Jurgens
- Artist(s): Ethan Van Sciver; Jason Paz; Carlo Pagulayan; Stephen Segovia; Andy Kubert; Ed Benes; Eduardo Pansica; Aaron Lopresti

"Convergence" is a comic book storyline published by DC Comics that ran from April to May 2015. The series consists of an eponymous #0 issue, an eight-issue core miniseries, and 40 two-issue tie-in miniseries. "Convergence" continues from the weekly series Earth 2: World's End and The New 52: Futures End. In the story, Brainiac collects cities and inhabitants from various timelines that have ended and traps them in domes on a planet outside of time and space. He then exposes the domes to one another to see how the characters interact. This event marks the return of DC characters and timelines from before the 2011 "Flashpoint" storyline that led to the creation of The New 52 Universe.

== Publication history ==
In 2014, DC Comics announced the Convergence miniseries as a conclusion to The New 52: Futures End and Earth 2: World's End.

Promotional art for the series

The miniseries was stated to involve characters from the pre-"Flashpoint" universe, including Brainiac, who had gained access to all of DC Comics' current and previous timelines and universes. Brainiac obtained the location of Vanishing Point after torturing Booster Gold in Booster Gold: Future's End #1. Conceived as a weekly series in April and May 2015, Convergence began with a #0 issue and ran for an additional eight issues. DC Comics said that during Convergence all regular comics would be put on hiatus and replaced with 40 two-part tie-in miniseries. These miniseries featured a variety of characters from throughout DC's publishing history.

Throughout November 2014, DC Comics announced these tie-ins in blocks of 10 on various websites. The titles were written by creators with stories for each character that predated the New 52 versions of characters. Each comic involved different DC characters under Brainiac's domes being forced to contend with the invasion of multiverse characters from pre-Flashpoint, Zero Hour, DC's Tangent Comics, and pre-Crisis on Infinite Earths timelines.

== Plot ==
In Convergence #8, the time traveler Waverider, a pre-Flashpoint future version of Booster Gold, summons Brainiac, who reveals that he was the pre-Flashpoint Brainiac who, after surviving that event, sought to explore the history of the Multiverse, but became mutated by the effects of the previous crises. He realizes what a monster he has become and seeks redemption. He prepares to send everyone back to their universes but is prevented by the damaging effects of the original crisis in Crisis on Infinite Earths. The heroes resolve to change the outcome of that crisis. As Brainiac sends the pre-Crisis Supergirl and Barry Allen back to meet their fates in the original Crisis story, pre-Flashpoint Superman and Zero Hour Parallax volunteer to go with them, changing the outcome of the crisis. Brainiac explains that this has brought changes to the Multiverse and has caused everything to return to how it was before he brought them there. The old worlds of the classic Multiverse live on in both their original versions and the modernized forms depicted in The Multiversity.

=== Subplots ===
==== Convergence: Action Comics ====
Though the dome came down some time ago, Metropolis of Earth-Two is in a state of relative peace and the married Lois Lane and the Superman of Earth-Two are looked up to by many. Even without his powers, Superman is still the hero of Metropolis, and Lois is sure not even the dome can take that away from him. Superman, however, feels guilty that he cannot escape the dome and free the city. By losing their powers, he and his cousin Kara have been robbed of their identities.

Meanwhile, in Moscow of Earth-30, Joseph Stalin is concerned that his people are losing faith in the indestructibility of his regime after the dome has robbed his Superman of his powers. Lex Luthor of Earth-30 takes advantage of this and claims that the dome is the alien's version of a zoo. Wonder Woman of Earth-30 states that the alien's intention is preservation and that there's a chance that every other city on their world was destroyed. Despite this, Lex Luthor does not know how to bring down the dome. He has determined that it's not a dome but a sphere. As a secret CIA agent, he has not given up on his allegiance to the United States and wonders if Russia is hiding secrets in the other half of that sphere. Despite his allegiances, Lex Luthor of Earth-30 has helped the Russians perfect an invisible jet. Superman of Earth-30 grimly interrupts a conversation between Lex Luthor and Lois Lane of Earth-30 to remind Luthor that he is sure that Luthor intended to steal the technology. He warns Luthor to stop antagonizing Joseph Stalin. Lex Luthor of Earth-30 warns that Stalin should be more concerned about the machinations of his own son Pyotr. Even so, Superman informs him that Stalin will not tolerate any further disrespect, and he will not be able to intervene on his behalf.

Back in Metropolis of Earth-Two, Lois gets frustrated that Superman of Earth-Two and Power Girl (Supergirl of Earth-Two) are still focusing on the dome surrounding their Metropolis. Superman of Earth-Two agrees to take her home, but Andrew Vinson, Power Girl's boyfriend, is concerned. Moments after Superman of Earth-Two and Lois of Earth-Two are gone, Power Girl and Andrew are startled by a voice coming from beyond the dome. It warns that the dome will soon fall and champions will be chosen from each of the cities on the planet Telos to fight for their city's survival. In Moscow, Wonder Woman of Earth-30 heard the same message.

==== Convergence: Adventures of Superman ====
While spending time in WayneTech Labs in pre-Crisis Gotham City, Supergirl of Earth-One notices a device which Lucius Fox of Earth-One explains is designed to read her subconscious physical reactions. With it, he hopes that she can help Superman of Earth-One rebuild the Phantom Zone Projector by sensing the correct placement of the parts that she subconsciously remembers from when her father Zor-El and uncle Jor-El built it when she was a girl. Superman of Earth-One hopes that by opening a way to the Phantom Zone, they'll be opening a way out of the dome that fell over Gotham of Earth-One a year ago. However, the Phantom Zone is filled with Krypton's worst criminals. After the Phantom Zone Projector is recreated, Superman and Supergirl of Earth-One enter, only to be sealed there when the device explodes. Suddenly from beyond the dome, Lucius Fox of Earth-One hears a voice warning that the dome will soon fall and champions will be forced to rise from each of the cities on the planet Telos to fight for the survival of their people. Superman and Supergirl of Earth-One wonder what the purpose of the dome was when they are suddenly overcome by nearby shockwaves and decide to investigate the source. Without warning, the pair is attacked by Phantom Zone prisoners who are eager for revenge. Superman is overpowered and urges Kara to go on without him. Supergirl of Earth-One spots geysers of gas coming from the ground. In the gas, she sees visions of her own past, future, and inevitable death at the hands of the Anti-Monitor. She then realizes if she does not go back to Earth, her loved ones will die, but if she goes back, she will die; she ultimately decides to save others. Supergirl gets lost in the gas, losing track of time. Eventually, she realizes that Superman of Earth-One should have been back by now and searches for him. Supergirl discovers that Superman is surrounded by Phantom Zone prisoners. After taking out several of the guards, Supergirl of Earth-One grabs Superman of Earth-One and they escape. While looking for a way out of the Phantom Zone and evading the gases, Superman and Supergirl of Earth-One are again attacked by the Phantom Zone prisoners. Back at Gotham of Earth-One, Lucius Fox is horrified when the dome goes down and the human-hating apes from Earth-AD march into Gotham.

==== Convergence: Aquaman ====
Aquaman of New Earth has been trapped under the dome with the citizens of Metropolis of New Earth and protects the people from criminals. His fish-out-of-water status has earned him unwanted media attention, and people are aware that he has become mentally unstable after being separated from his home and losing his hand. After arriving, Aquaman fashioned a spike to replace that hand and used it to defeat Chemo. However, this polluted the harbor, isolating him from the only natural water source left. This forced him to reside in the Metropolis Aquarium and replace the spike attached to his wrist with a hook.

At S.T.A.R. Labs, Dane Dorrance attempts to console Aquaman, noting that many other metahumans lost their abilities under the dome while he was able to retain his Atlantean biology. He has, however, lost his telepathic connection with the fish. While Aquaman admits that this has impacted him, he refuses to talk about it, as talking will not help him get back to Mera. Aquaman then recognizes Dorrance as a member of the Sea Devils. Dorrance convinces Aquaman to leave the aquarium and live at S.T.A.R. Labs where he would still be allowed to patrol. While Aquaman showers for hydration, the water suddenly turns off. A voice then announces that the dome will go down and champions must fight for the fate of their cities.

Other metahumans begin to regain their powers including Parallax of New-Earth. The D.E.O. begins tracking Parallax only to be attacked by Deathblow of the WildStorm Universe. Deathblow then searches for and finds Aquaman.

The scientists at S.T.A.R. Labs are attacked by a fighter from another city. The scientists turn to Aquaman for insight, and he surmises that the attacker would use the sewers to get in. At that moment, the soldiers in the sewers are slain by Deathblow. Aquaman then engages Deathblow in combat. After injuring Deathblow, Aquaman leads him to the power plant. Deathblow then uses S.T.A.R. Labs' "Drydock" contingency plan and activates it to dry Aquaman out. When Aquaman tries to turn on the sprinklers, no water comes out. Deathblow then prepares to kill a weakened Aquaman and taunts him that the nearest ocean is a universe away. Dorrance recalls that every cell in the human body evolved from cells that had once subsisted in the sea and that the human body is primarily composed of water. Hearing this, Aquaman thrusts his hook into Deathblow's throat and draws strength from the water in the blood pouring from Deathblow's veins. Aquaman's victory causes WildStorm Universe's San Francisco and Deathblow to vanish. Aquaman of New Earth then goes on patrol to see if any other characters from the other cities will be attacking.

==== Convergence: Batgirl ====
One year after the dome has surrounded Gotham City of New Earth, Stephanie Brown (Batgirl), Tim Drake, and Cassandra Cain of New-Earth are waiting in the El Inferno desert when they are attacked by Catman of Flashpoint who states that he was transported here while fighting Gorilla Grodd. It is discovered that Batgirl was chosen to fight Catman. In a flashback sequence from when the dome first appeared, it is revealed that Stephanie had quit being Batgirl. Cassandra and Stephanie are living together when the news announces that several of Gotham's champions have been selected to fight the champions of other cities and that the winner of this fight ensures the survival of their city. Batgirl is on the list while Black Bat and Red Robin are not. Stephanie, a year out of shape, begins training with Cassandra. They are interrupted by stampeding Gotham City citizens eager to leave after dome dissolves. Batgirl is then surrounded by a force meant to take her to the contest when Tim and Cass grab on. This transports all three of them to the El Inferno desert.

When Gotham City of Flashpoint was placed under a dome, Gorilla Grodd was locked up in a zoo after losing his powers. When the dome dissolved, Grodd began fighting Catman until they were both transported to the El Inferno desert: New Earth Gotham City vs. Flashpoint Gotham City. Black Bat fights Grodd and begins losing as Batgirl begs for Grodd to fight her instead. Grodd states that he does not need to choose; he just needs to kill them all. Batgirl breaks free from Grodd's grasp by ripping some hair from his head. Red Robin is under Grodd's control, so Batgirl knocks him out. Batgirl proposes to Catman that they throw the fight so at least one of their cities will be saved. Catman informs Batgirl that Grodd has killed everyone he loves back in his world so he should at least help her save Gotham. Catman allows Batgirl to hit him, losing the fight and allowing Gotham's heroes to return to Gotham of New Earth.

==== Convergence: Batman: Shadow of the Bat ====
Trapped underneath a dome in Metropolis, pre-Zero Hour Batman attempts to get through the criminal underworld and even offers his fortune to Tobias Whale of New Earth. To prove Bruce Wayne worthy, Tobias Whale sends one of his underlings, Jean-Paul Valley, who warns Bruce that, with his broken back, he will not be able to defend himself. Bruce explains that he was drawn to Metropolis after the transformation of Green Lantern into Parallax and ended up trapped beneath the dome.

At this point, Tobias Whale was close to controlling food distribution. Bruce Wayne was opposed to this, and Jean-Paul was plotting an inside job to stop Tobias. Although Jean-Paul is reluctant, the two become uneasy allies. To convince Tobias that he did his job, however, Jean-Paul has to beat Bruce quite brutally and bring Bruce to Tobias Whale who remains unconvinced. Tobias Whale suggests that Bruce can prove himself if he uses his political pull to learn the route used to transport food to distribution services which changes with every transport.

At Metropolis City Hall, Bruce and Jean-Paul pay a visit to councilman Erasmus Hall in an attempt to learn the route. Jean-Paul's methods are cruel, but the two learn the route and deliver it to Whale. Whale then has his people kill Hall and make it look like a suicide. Bruce has to keep his cool as news coverage shows Hall's wife and children grieving him. Two days later, Bruce Wayne and Jean-Paul Valley await the food distribution in their batsuits. When they both leap onto the truck, Tobias Whale's SUV pulls up in front of it. As Bruce prevents Jean-Paul from killing Tobias Whale's henchman Nikka, a voice is heard stating that the dome will fall as the champions from the other areas will need to fight for their survival. Jean-Paul knocks out Tobias Whale and beings from another world are shown watching the action.

==== Convergence: Batman and Robin ====
Pre-Flashpoint Poison Ivy is defending Gotham City's Robinson Park from Penguin, Man-Bat, Mr. Freeze, Black Mask, and Killer Croc who want control over it because the park is cultivated to feed the domed Gotham City. When Penguin tries to have Man-Bat physically remove Poison Ivy from the park, Batman and Damian Wayne as Robin show up. The heroes, assisted by Red Hood and Scarlet, succeed in driving the villains from the park, and Poison Ivy thanks Batman and the others for their help.

Back at the Batcave, Damian is displeased with his father's welcoming attitude toward Jason Todd returning as vigilante Red Hood in Gotham. Batman assures him that Jason is no replacement for Robin and certainly no replacement for his son. Angrily, Damian reminds Batman that the two of them have been protecting Gotham alone for more than a year and is angry that, as soon as Jason showed up, Bruce acted like Jason was part of the family. Damian removes his costume and storms off.

While in his study, Bruce sees the bat-signal and tells Alfred to find Damian. Alfred responds that Damian has left with one of the Batmobiles. Suddenly, a voice from beyond the dome announces that the barrier around the city will soon fall and that champions from within the city must fight for its survival against the champions of another city. Batman informs the others that he will not be forced into combat like this. They will find another way, but they do not have a choice as the Extremists have already arrived to challenge them.

==== Convergence: Blue Beetle ====
Since the dome came down around the Hub City of Earth-Four, the authorities have been taking weapons away from its citizens. Vic Sage (Question) of Earth-Four reports on this as a group of protesters called the Madmen face the National Guardsmen led by Captain Allen Adam. Question insists Adam justify his actions. Adam explains that, by fooling people into thinking they have a choice, Question is actually the one responsible for what happened today. Question responds with a message for Allen—Ted Kord needs Captain Atom's help.

Ted has been working on a device that could possibly shatter the dome. When Allen Adam arrives, Ted's device is activated, shooting a hole in the dome but does not bring it down. Ted considers putting on his Blue Beetle outfit, but Allen Adam warns that costumed superhero work is still illegal. Strange lights appear in the sky, and when Allan Adam recognizes the energy signature, he flies up to investigate. Allan Adam finds Doctor Spectro investigating the incident that returned his powers as well. They are interrupted by Booster Gold of New Earth who Allan Adam attacks after assuming he is with Doctor Spectro. Ted in his Blue Beetle uniform arrives just in time to see Booster Gold of New-Earth disappear along with everyone's powers. However, Blue Beetle's choice to save Allan Adam results in Spectro falling with no one to catch him. The Question suggests that their powers returned as a result of someone from outside the dome coming in and that they should pursue that theory instead of finding a way out. Suddenly, the building beneath them shudders and transforms into the form of a humanoid which speaks and warns that the dome will soon fall. When it does, champions from each of the many domed cities on the planet's surface will have to rise and fight for their home's survival. Within moments, the dome falls and the heroes of Hub City must wait to discover what that means for them.

==== Convergence: Booster Gold ====
In a memory of District Gotham (AD 2462), Booster Gold invades a lab to steal a machine called the SKS. Guards shoot the machine, triggering it. In the present he is confronted by Skeets and Rip Hunter, who are looking for the other Booster Gold (A.R.G.U.S.). They free him and he finds out that he was imprisoned in the underground city of Skartaris' Castle Deimos, along with all the other time travelers, by Deimos. Rip reveals that someone is looking for Vanishing Point. Booster reveals that he told them about it, to protect Michelle, Rip's aunt. They descend to the basement, where the other time travelers are kept. They free Michelle and Gold (leaving Per Degaton imprisoned), and Rip reveals that he is Gold's son. Gold is dying from chronal energy accumulated while traveling from city to city. Just then Gold vanishes, having become unstuck in time.

Deimos and his lizard men appear, being fought by Machiste. They fight and escape through a tunnel and Booster flies them up above the surface. Skeets explains that Gold's chronal signature is being overwhelmed by the chronal energy in his body, resulting in his bouncing from city to city. They locate him in a city from the 31st century and fight the Legion of Super-Heroes. Gold vanishes and reappears in a city with Metropolis and Blue Beetle of DC Rebirth and warns him not to trust Maxwell Lord. Then he collapses. Beetle takes him aloft in his Scarab.

Meanwhile, Rip, Booster, and Michelle are confronted by the Legion, who have regained their powers. Rip warps them 45 minutes into the cities' future and they leave. With Kord, Gold has begun to visibly age. Rip, Booster, and Michelle break into Kord's building to find Gold on the point of collapse. They take him to Vanishing Point, which has been trashed by Brainiac. They take him to the Vault, where he is revitalized as Waverider. Waverider sends Kord back to his city and returns Booster and Skeets to their time. He puts Rip and Michelle in an unspecified place and departs.

==== Convergence: Catwoman ====
Pre-Zero Hour Catwoman has arrived in Pre-Zero Hour Metropolis to find that the owner of a diamond necklace she had intended on stealing has been targeted for kidnap. She thwarts the kidnapping but fails to get the necklace before security arrives. Moments after making her escape, a dome appears around the city, effectively cutting it off from the rest of the world.

One year later, Catwoman is now the protector of Suicide Slum and defeats a gang of murderous mercenaries. Bruno Mannheim has now taken over of much of the city by gaining control of the distribution of medical supplies and food. To maintain his monopoly on medicine, Mannheim kidnaps various scientists and chemists including a friend of Selina's named Sally. Using an EMP grenade, Catwoman breaks in, locates Sally, and they escape. While on a nearby roof, they hear a voice from beyond the dome claiming that the dome will soon fall and that challengers from the different domed cities will have to fight each other for the survival of their home and people.

Not long after the announcement, Kingdom Come Batman appears to challenge her, but Catwoman does not recognize him as this Batman wears a suit of armor and is older.

Catwoman's main objective is getting Sally to safety, but Intergang catches up, finds Batman on the roof with her, and assumes correctly that he's been sent to fight for the survival of Kingdom Come Gotham City over Pre-Zero Hour Metropolis. Selina grabs Sally and leaps off the roof, leaving Batman to fight Intergang. Once Sally is safe, Catwoman returns to face Batman, who now realizes that he is not on Kingdom Come Earth.

Catwoman hurls an EMP device at Batman, causing the electronics in his suit to shut down and sends him crashing to the ground. Dodging out of his way, she lets him skid across the roof and over the edge onto the street pavement. She leaps down onto his chest and pins him while he waits for his suit to boot up. He explains that they are from different worlds and demands to know what kind of person she is. Coyly, she chooses not to take the question seriously, so he accuses her of being a thief like his Catwoman. Selina responds that, while she does enjoy cat burglary, she has been acting as protector of Suicide Slum. Catwoman assumes from what she knows of her own Batman that this one will not simply trust the words of their captor Telos, and he admits that he does not take orders from anyone. Despite that, it may be optimistic to believe that they were paired together for a reason and that they can unite in taking down their captor. He and Intergang have come to ensure that Catwoman wins. Batman shields her from their bullets and warns her to wait for his signal to bring the fight to them.

With a blinding flash of light, Batman disorients Intergang, and he and Catwoman attack. When Catwoman corners Mannheim, she discovers that he is wearing an indestructible Apokoliptian jacket. He knocks her aside, declaring himself the protector of Metropolis. With his superior strength, Mannheim pins Batman to the ground and tears open his armor. This distraction allows Catwoman to kick the power-source for his jacket off his back, destroying it and rendering him powerless against Batman's retaliation. Despite Batman helping to take out Mannheim, the people of Metropolis are no less convinced that the invader from another city has to die. They heard the voice too, and it told them that one of them must fall for the city to survive.

A sudden earthquake startles one of the citizens, and he fires a shot at Batman's exposed chest. Rather than let Batman be killed, Catwoman jumps in front of him, taking the bullet. Knowing she will not survive, she begs Batman to try to save both cities and he promises that he will try.

==== Convergence: Crime Syndicate ====
The Crime Syndicate of Earth-Three, while criminals, do not intend to hurt anybody. However, the death of Bruno Mannheim of Earth-Three is on their hands, and Superwoman has been wrongly imprisoned for his death for one year. Despite the lack of their powers, Ultraman, Owlman, Power Ring, and Johnny Quick don their costumes and plan to free Superwoman who is now on death row.

Meanwhile, in the Metropolis of the 853rd century, the Luthorians have taken over the infrastructure of the entire city and the Justice Legion is running out of places to hide. Batman asks how many more must die before they take proactive measures, but while Superman is reminding Batman that they are not killers, his words are cut short by an explosion. Atom of the Justice Legion is killed in the blast, and the Luthorian Elite Guard are coming. Superman looks around and sees that Batman is missing.

The Crime Syndicate race to death row but are stopped mid-way by the Rogue Hunters. Rather than be taken alive, the men open gunfire and charge ahead. The distraction is just enough to rob them of their chance to save Superwoman and the switch on the electric chair is thrown.

Back in the 853rd-century Metropolis, Batman evades a group of Luthorians, knowing that Lincoln Luthor cannot be far behind which means Batman will finally have an opportunity to see him dead. As Ultraman, Owlman, Power Ring, and Johnny Quick are shackled and led away by the Rogue Hunters, they are startled by a voice from beyond the dome. It warns that the dome will soon fall and champions from all of the cities across the planet Telos will have to rise and fight for the survival of their people and their home. As the dome falls around Earth-Three's Metropolis, the Crime Syndicate's powers return; they turn on their captors to ensure they pay for killing Superwoman. Before they can have their revenge, they are mysteriously transported away.

Despite being given the power to fight the Luthorians again, Batman warns Superman that they might have to wait. The voice from beyond had spoken of a battle and they likely have little chance of avoiding that fight. Shortly after this exchange, the two are transported away. They all materialize in different parts of 853rd-century Metropolis. Superman then wonders how he's supposed to fight for the survival of his city if it means the death of another. He intends to find a way to avoid a battle altogether. Just then, the Superman of the Justice Legion finds himself taken by surprise when Ultraman attacks him.

==== Convergence: Harley Quinn ====
Harley Quinn is at the Gotham Museum of Art to steal a bejeweled hyena skull. Her henchmen are less interested than she is, and things start to go awry quickly. The police arrive and shoot one of her least helpful hirelings. As she tries to hurry the men in getting the skull for her, Bud and Lou begin signaling that a dome was forming over their city.

Sometime later, Harley visits her psychiatrist, Dr. Elstree, to discuss how she's been doing lately. He admits that he gave up his office to a Victims of the Dome support group, and they are now forced to meet in the atrium. She lies and says that she does not hallucinate the Joker's presence anymore and admits that, ever since the dome came down, she has been feeling somewhat optimistic, unlike most people. For her, the sudden rescue of Gotham City from some untold destruction proves that there is a higher power beyond the dome. Since the dome event, Harley has actually been reaching out to the community, specifically Officer Louie D'Anna, whom she had nearly killed during her botched robbery. Dr. Elstree arranged for her to meet him as a means of trying to make her develop some empathy for her victims so Harley could confront the damage that she did.

Harley returns to the home she shares with Louie while hallucinating the goldfish from Dr. Elstree's office was swimming between her fingers as she began cutting vegetables for dinner. Suddenly, the Joker's face appears behind her, and she is so shaken that she falls on the floor screaming for Louie. He rushes to her side and comforts her, explaining that there's nobody there but them. Happily, she kisses him and pins him to the couch.

Elsewhere in Gotham, a powerless Poison Ivy is having difficulty fighting off a gang of thieves from one of her vegetable gardens. Fortunately, Catwoman comes to her aid. After helping her take down the thugs, they are all startled by a rumbling voice from beyond the dome. The voice warns that the dome will soon fall and champions from this world and those in the other domes will have to fight to determine which city will survive.

Strangely, it appears he's selected Harley Quinn as this city's champion to fight a cartoon rabbit from one of the other domes. Neither Catwoman nor Ivy feels this bodes well for their continued existence. Hurriedly, the pair storm into her apartment, and despite Louie's protest, they both agree that there is only one way to make this work. They need to get the crazy Harley back. Ivy injects her with a toxin to counteract the mood stabilizers in her body, but Louie warns that Harley had been off her meds for months already. Nervously, they wait to see which Harley will wake up for them. When she does come to, Harley Quinn is crazier than ever.

Captain Carrot has been selected as the champion for his city of Follywood, Califurnia. He has been transported to his opponent's home city without any knowledge about whom he has to face. For that reason, Alley-Kat-Abra sends Pig-Iron after him to warn that the opponent he will face is a loon. Harley Quinn finds Pig-Iron first. Using the oil that had lubricated Pig-Iron's mechanical parts, she leaves a message for Captain Carrot: it's a rabbit season. When he discovers it, Captain Carrot promises that his old friend will be avenged.

An hour earlier, Captain Carrot had encountered Harley who had gotten to the amusement park early. When he expressed no desire to fight her, she claimed that she had a great many superpowers and swung her mallet at him, claiming it was magic. The force of her strike against the ground caused the explosives she had hidden earlier to go off, knocking Captain Carrot down. Sensing that he was in danger, Alley-Kat-Abra searched the minds of Gotham City for any clue that could help him.

She discovered a conversation between Catwoman, Poison Ivy, and Harley's boyfriend Louie who admitted that he'd been feeling sick with fear ever since he saw Harley in costume again. He explained that he had forgotten what it was like to be in the field as a cop with costumes involved and that Harley was one of the most dangerous and insane costumed criminals. Louie went on to explain that when he saw Harley out of costume for the first time and she came to visit him in the hospital, he'd stopped being afraid of her and became afraid for her. He believed in the power of rehabilitation and hoped she would be able to beat whomever she was set against. Worriedly, Alley-Kat-Abra relayed this information to Captain Carrot.

When Harley had encountered Pig-Iron, she had not actually killed him; it was Brainiac's drones who discovered him as an intruder and transported him away, leaving only a pool of oil behind. Since Captain Carrot is angry over what he believes to be the death of his friend, he is even more determined to defeat Harley, who is now on one of the park's roller-coasters. Angrily, he smashes her mallet, and when it gives her a splinter, she claims her blood contains acid and flicks it at him, causing him to recoil. He recovers in time to see that the ride is about to go off the rails. Worriedly, he begs her to use the teleportation abilities she claimed to have, but neither of them can fly or teleport, and they crash.

Both survive, and Harley admits that she had only been joking about killing Pig-Iron. She offers him a carrot as a snack, and he must admit they are very good. Harley explains that her friend the gardener had grown them and had given her an immunity to poisons. Hearing this, he spits out the carrot, as Harley continues rambling on, and he begins to feel more nauseated. Harley has beaten him using her wits.

Sometime later, Louie receives a visitor at his apartment where he now lives alone. Catwoman stands there, holding up the goldfish Harley had won at the amusement park before the battle and admits that Harley would not trust anyone else with it. He asks about Harley, and Selina softens, explaining that Harley is still a bit too manic to be around people. As she leaves, he calls after her that he is not people.

Selina reunites with Harley and Ivy, who are preparing to leave the city now that the dome is down and the heroes are back. As the van drives off, Louie remains behind in his apartment, staring at the goldfish, depressed; he knows that he's probably lost Harley forever.

==== Convergence: Plastic Man and the Freedom Fighters ====
Plastic Man and the Freedom Fighters (Uncle Sam, Doll Man, Human Bomb, The Ray, Black Condor, and Phantom Lady) of Earth-X are trapped in their dome with the Silver Ghost, whom they had lured to New York City. When the dome comes down after a year, they reluctantly combine forces to fight the killer robots of Futures End. Despite their differences, they work together to find and destroy the controlling intelligence and the robots shut down. Silver Ghost and Plastic Man squabble over the final robots' blueprints, ending with Silver Ghost getting them and being destroyed in the final explosion.

==== Convergence: Shazam! ====
Billy Batson is working as a radio announcer for WHIZ Radio in Fawcett City on Earth-S when a man in the crowd, distraught over the failure of Captain Marvel to appear and help the captive city, tries to blow himself up. They are saved by the Bullets (Bulletman and Bulletgirl), who pull him into the sky where he explodes harmlessly. Billy, Freddy Freeman, and Mary Batson later follow Sterling Morris and Uncle Dudley, who have been acting suspiciously. They go into the subway, but are surprised and caught by a reborn Mister Atom. Atom takes them into a tunnel where King Kull is working on a machine. Morris and Uncle Dudley appear. Uncle Dudley uses a holographic field to reveal their true identities, Doctor Sivana and Ibac. They were part of a plan (with Oggar) to infiltrate the Marvels but were trapped in those forms when the dome went up.

In the cells, they find the real Morris and Uncle Dudley in chains. Just then, Tawky Tawny appears. He dodges a ray from Sivana and Mary knocks the gun from Sivana's hands. Billy is about to use it when Kull and Atom appear with their own rayguns. Atom reveals that the dome is down and Billy transforms into Captain Marvel. Mary and Freddy also transform, as do Sivana and Ibac. They fight, but then the building collapses, crushing Atom, Kull, Sivana and Ibac. The collapse also reveals that Fawcett City is being attacked by zeppelins.

The Bullets are saved by Marvel, who goes off to investigate the other city. There, he is attacked by the Batman of Gotham by Gaslight (Earth-1889) with a flame weapon. Then he is electrocuted with a massive charge that triggers a confused state where Billy and Captain Marvel converse. Then Batman's aero-ship is pulled away by some force along with other metal objects. A force dome stops them from progressing further, so they go into the sewers where they meet a controlled Killer Croc. Inside the Gotham Exhibition Hall, they meet a rebodied Captain Atom who has used the project he was working on, the Machinovirus, to rebuild himself and the Monster Society Of Evil with Gotham by Gaslight's villains. As he emerges from the ruins of the exhibition hall, the Marvels, Tawny, and the Bullets attack.

Captain Marvel figures out that Mister Atom is just a suit of armor, protecting Mister Mind. Discovered, Mind self-destructs the Mister Atom suit. Gotham goes away and the Marvels and their allies fly off into the sky.

==== Convergence: Speed Force ====
Having started out as a sidekick to a Flash, Wally West now holds the role and has two sidekicks of his own, his children Jai and Iris. They inherited his connection to the Speed Force, which binds them together in a literal sense. Against his wife Linda's warnings, he has brought the kids along on a potential combat mission, knowing that their powers are still unstable. He rationalizes it by thinking that leaving the kids at home would make them easy prey for his enemies.

Wally and the kids arrive at their destination—what the JLA alert calls a "chronal disturbance". They speed all the way to Gotham City from Keystone City to investigate it. There is something familiar about this disturbance; Wally senses the energy signature of Barry Allen coming from it, which should not be possible. As soon as they get within a short distance of the disturbance, a dome forms around Pre-Flashpoint Gotham City, cutting it off from the rest of the planet.

After nearly a year, Wally is still trying to get free and has continuously regretted bringing Jai and Iris with him. Like every other super-human who was trapped under the dome, they lost their powers, and people are beginning to suspect that the former Flash is starting to lose his mind. Wally has not moved at a human pace since before he got powers, but he still jogs everywhere trying to stay in shape for Linda's sake. He knows she's surely been wondering if he and the kids are alive for the past year. He'd gone to both Batman and the Atom for help getting home, but they could not do any more than he could against the impenetrable dome. Eventually, they stopped trying, but Wally is fixated.

After spending all night attempting to escape the dome, Wally returns home to his kids, who are late for school. Jai senses why his father is so determined and assures him that he misses Linda too. Wally hugs him and mourns the fact that he did not listen to her when she'd warned him not to take them on the mission.

Suddenly, a voice from beyond the dome rings out over the city, warning that the dome would soon be removed and champions from this and other cities would be forced to fight for the right to exist. As the dome recedes, Wally and his children are immediately re-empowered. The children wonder if this means that they will be able to go home, but Wally does not know and is more concerned that he will be forced into battle against champions from other worlds. He determines first to go and provide aid to the people dressed like Old West heroes who are being ambushed by a Hawkman and Hawkwoman. In the meantime, he orders Jai and Iris to stay inside and remain there until he comes back. They make him promise to come back.

By the time he arrives in El Inferno, Wally is too late. The voice of the planet Telos warns that the Justice Riders have fallen to the Hawkmen, and the Justice Riders' city no longer has a place on Telos' surface. The voice warns that this should be a lesson to him. If he refuses to fight, he and Gotham will face the same fate as El Inferno. Before Wally's eyes, the city and its citizens begin to crumble to dust. Horrified, he wonders if this is the fate that awaits his children.

Having lost track of where their Gotham is, Wally asks them to keep an eye out as they run from city to city looking for home. Every city they pass through appears to be at war with another city. It makes him worry that they will not be the ones to survive even if they fight for it. As they speed along, they begin to sense an unfamiliar energy signature in the Speed Force, and its owner appears to be gaining on them. Hurriedly, Wally gets them to their Gotham but stops once within city limits, assuring the children that they will stand and fight whoever has been chasing them. When he turns around, he does not see anyone he might have expected.

Fastback, a speedster turtle from Follywood, Califurnia, catches up with them. He explains that he is not looking for a fight; he's looking for help. When he saw Wally speed through his city, he realized that there might be other speedsters out there and hoped that they could all team up to fight whoever forced them into this situation. Wally is interested, but they are prevented from talking further by the arrival of another time's Wonder Woman who has brought an army of Amazons to fight for her city's survival.

==== Convergence: Superboy ====
Pre-Zero Hour Metropolis has spent a year under an impenetrable dome, and Dubbilex has spent that time trying to restore Superboy's powers and break through the dome. He has had no success with either goal. Dubbilex realizes that the dome itself is inhibiting Superboy's power. Superboy is worried as he knows that the responsibility of protecting Metropolis will fall to him in Superman's absence. Metropolis had just begun to accept Superboy when the dome appeared. He had been arrogant at first, but just as he started to accept the responsibility of the power he held, those powers were taken away from him. That loss has made him feel lost himself.

Dejected after another failure to restore his powers in the lab, Superboy visits the Superman statue in Centennial Park where an elderly couple approaches him, explaining that they were saved from Parasite by Superman. While feeling like he is living in Superman's shadow, Superboy hears a voice ring out from beyond the dome warning that it will soon disappear and champions from other cities on the planet Telos will be made to fight for the survival of their homes. As the dome comes down, Superboy feels his powers returning. Filled with joy, he tears open his shirt to reveal his costume, unaware that he is being watched by the Red Robin of another world.

While flying over Metropolis, Superboy spots a streak that resembles the Flash, but upon closer inspection, he does not recognize this Flash's costume. He follows the streak to Hell's Gate Island, which was cut in half by the dome and left largely uninhabitable. While monitoring Superboy, Dubbilex realizes that Superboy would only be led there as a trap. Following the streak into an abandoned building, Superboy is caught in a blast of kryptonite gas and attacked by Red Robin. Eventually, the gas wears off and Superboy retaliates with his tactile telekinesis. When the Flash rescues Red Robin from his fall, Superboy is forced to ask who they are.

Dubbilex determines that Red Robin is Dick Grayson, but he appears to be fifteen years older, suggesting that both he and the Flash are not the versions of themselves that Superboy knows. They are the heroes of an alternate Earth. The Superman of another world then intervenes and warns Superboy that if he intends to save two versions of Metropolis, he'd best surrender.

==== Convergence: Supergirl: Matrix ====
Since the dome came down, Lex Luthor has been somewhat depressed that he no longer needs to plot Superman's demise. He has been carrying around a device for the whole year that he's been trapped and hoping it would signal a change in the integrity of the dome. Today, sitting in Centennial Park with his reluctant friend Matrix, it finally reactivates as a voice rings out above the dome warning of the dome's imminent disappearance and a need for the city's champions to fight for the city's survival.

Excited but nervous, Lex has Matrix fly him to his lab, where he searches for a way to ensure that they can leave the planet on which they've been imprisoned. He hopes to discover the technology that brought them to this planet. Handing Matrix a device, he orders her to use it to track the energy source of the teleportation technology that captured them and bring it to him before one of these other cities' challengers defeats her.

Meanwhile, in The Verge, Lady Quark and Lord Volt observe the citizens of their opponent city and feel unsympathetic toward them. Soon, they spot Supergirl and accost her. Their bickering proves a useful distraction, allowing her to return from her mission of finding the energy source, but the device Lex gave her does not seem to be working. By the time it does start making noises, Quark and Volt are back promising that they're ready for her, but she has to follow the signal. They warn that she'll have to go through them, and seeing no other way, she punches Lord Volt in the face. In response, Quark damages the device, further frustrating Supergirl who telekinetically knocks her across the city.

The device begins working again, and Supergirl follows it until Lex's voice comes through it, berating her. Angrily, she drops the device, letting it smash and realizing too late that she's just destroyed the only hope of getting off the planet. Determined to get Lex off of her back, she wonders if other cities will give her sanctuary. A nearby voice warns that she should not bet on it. Turning, Supergirl sees Ambush Bug, and admits that she's glad to see him.

==== Convergence: Superman ====
Following one year without having his powers, Superman is patrolling the streets of Gotham City in a black outfit with his face covered while his wife Lois Lane is on the cusp of giving birth to their child.

==== Convergence: The Flash ====
Every morning, Barry Allen wakes to find that his wife Iris is not with him and remembers, once again, that he has been trapped. All of Gotham City has been trapped within a dome for the better part of a year, Barry has been robbed of his super-speed by the dome.

He had come back to Pre-Crisis Gotham City from his home in the 31st Century to appear at a paralympics event when the dome appeared. He has been trying to find a way out every day, but with every metahuman's abilities gone, it seems impossible. It puzzles Barry how well the people of Gotham have adapted to their new state of affairs. He still runs, hoping that one day he'll run fast enough to access the Speed Force again. A beeping of his pager prompts him to stop running and call in from a pay phone. Some lab results are back at Gotham Central, and he has to be at work.

He managed to get a job with the Central City Police Department's crime lab and he's been paired with Josie Leighton as his chief lab assistant for the last six months. Barry is fond of her and Josie as well, but Barry still has some thoughts of Iris. In another life, maybe he would take her up on her offers to go out for coffee together. Still, he cannot help but worry that this is another life and he might as well start living it. Barry joins Bruce Wayne for coffee in her place, expressing his worries about just how doomed their efforts to escape the dome are. Bruce suggests that he think on this challenge less like a sprint and more like a marathon.

As Barry cabs back to work, he and his driver sense a tension in the air that is unexpected and unusual. Receiving another page, he exits the cab to make a call back to Josie, who warns of an urgent crime scene investigation where he's needed. Seeing traffic piling up, he pays off the driver and decides to walk the eight blocks to the scene, but is surprised when he sees that the dome has disappeared. A voice then rings out a warning that, with the dome gone, champions must rise up from all of the cities on the planet Telos' surface and fight for the survival of their homes. Barry runs to find Bruce and tell him what he heard, but as he runs, he feels himself getting faster and faster. His connection with the Speed Force is back. Gleefully, he opens his ring and dons his uniform as The Flash.

Climbing to a high vantage point on the edge of Gotham, Barry realizes with horror that this is not Earth at all and there are other cities out there. Worriedly, he calls out to the voice he heard earlier begging to know who it was and what he meant. Knowing that he is one of the champions, he calls out that he's ready. A challenger from another city answers him admitting that, while he is not eager to fight, they are supposed to. He too has only just got his powers back. Barry's prospective opponent believes that he is Superman.

== Aftermath ==
Convergence ended The New 52 branding. Beginning in June 2015, and lasting throughout July, the DC Comics line of comic books consisted of 24 new series that began at issue one. Alongside the new additions, the company continued publishing 25 of their existing ongoing titles, all of which maintained their current numbering and storylines. After the announcement of the overhaul of DC Comics' publishing line, Dan DiDio compared the company's plans for post-Convergence stories to the One Year Later storylines that followed Infinite Crisis in 2006. Didio stated that "in terms of expectations and challenges, the lessons learned in the 'One Year Later jump' were applied to insure [sic] our June series (hopefully) do not experience some of the same pitfalls".

== Titles ==
Title	Writer(s)	Artist(s)
Convergence #0–8	Jeff King, Dan Jurgens and Scott Lobdell	Ethan Van Sciver, Carlo Pagulayan, Stephen Segovia, Andy Kubert, Sandra Hope, Ed Benes
Week One (pre-Flashpoint characters)
Atom #1–2	Tom Peyer	Steve Yeowell
Batgirl #1–2	Alisa Kwitney	Rick Leonardi and Mark Pennington
Batman and Robin #1–2	Ron Marz	Denys Cowan and Klaus Janson
Harley Quinn #1–2	Steve Pugh	Phil Winslade and John Dell
Justice League #1–2	Frank Tieri	Vicente Cifuentes
Nightwing/Oracle #1–2	Gail Simone	Jan Duursema and Dan Parsons
The Question #1–2	Greg Rucka	Cully Hamner
Speed Force #1–2	Tony Bedard	Tom Grummett and Sean Parsons
Superman #1–2	Dan Jurgens	Lee Weeks and Dan Jurgens
Titans #1–2	Fabian Nicieza	Ron Wagner and Jose Marzan
Week Two (pre-Zero Hour characters)
Aquaman #1–2	Tony Bedard	Cliff Richards
Batman: Shadow of the Bat #1–2	Larry Hama	Philip Tan and Jason Paz
Catwoman #1–2	Justin Gray	Ron Randall
Green Arrow #1–2	Christy Marx	Rags Morales and Claude St-Aubin
Green Lantern/Parallax #1–2	Tony Bedard	Ron Wagner and Bill Reinhold
Justice League International #1–2	Ron Marz	Mike Manley
Suicide Squad #1–2	Frank Tieri	Tom Mandrake
Superboy #1–2	Fabian Nicieza	Karl Moline and Jose Marzan Jr
Supergirl: Matrix #1–2	Keith Giffen	Ramon Bachs
Superman: The Man of Steel #1–2	Louise Simonson	June Brigman and Roy Richardson
Week Three (characters from the time of Crisis on Infinite Earths)
Adventures of Superman #1–2	Marv Wolfman	Roberto Viacava and Andy Owens
Batman and the Outsiders #1–2	Marc Andreyko	Carlos D’anda
Flash #1–2	Dan Abnett	Federico Dallocchio
Green Lantern Corps #1–2	David Gallaher	Steve Ellis and Ande Parks
Hawkman #1–2	Jeff Parker	Tim Truman and Enrique Alcatena
Justice League of America #1–2	Fabian Nicieza	Chriscross
New Teen Titans #1–2	Marv Wolfman	Nicola Scott and Marc Deering
Superboy and the Legion of Super-Heroes #1–2	Stuart Moore	Gus Storms and Mark Farmer
Swamp Thing #1–2	Len Wein	Kelley Jones
Wonder Woman #1–2	Larry Hama	Josh Middleton
Week Four (pre-Crisis on Infinite Earths characters)
Action Comics #1–2	Justin Gray	Claude St-Aubin and Sean Parsons
Blue Beetle #1–2	Scott Lobdell	Yishan Li
Booster Gold #1–2	Dan Jurgens	Alvaro Martinez and Raul Fernandez
Crime Syndicate #1–2	Brian Buccellato	Phil Winslade
Detective Comics #1–2	Len Wein	Denys Cowan and Bill Sienkiewicz
Infinity Inc. #1–2	Jerry Ordway	Ben Caldwell
Justice Society of America #1–2	Dan Abnett	Tom Derenick and Trevor Scott
Plastic Man and the Freedom Fighters #1–2	Simon Oliver	John Mccrea
Shazam! #1–2	Jeff Parker	Evan "Doc" Shaner
World's Finest #1–2	Paul Levitz	Jim Fern and Joe Rubinstein (with cartoons by Shannon Wheeler)

== Collected editions ==
Convergence and its miniseries were collected and released in October 2015:

- Convergence (320 pages, hardcover, October 13, 2015, ISBN 1-4012-5686-4)
- Convergence: Zero Hour Book One (272 pages, softcover, October 13, 2015, ISBN 1-4012-5839-5)
- Convergence: Zero Hour Book Two (272 pages, softcover, October 13, 2015, ISBN 1-4012-5840-9)
- Convergence: Crisis Book One (272 pages, softcover, October 20, 2015, ISBN 1-4012-5808-5)
- Convergence: Crisis Book Two (272 pages, softcover, October 20, 2015, ISBN 1-4012-5834-4)
- Convergence: Flashpoint Book One (272 pages, softcover, October 27, 2015, ISBN 1-4012-5835-2)
- Convergence: Flashpoint Book Two (272 pages, softcover, October 27, 2015, ISBN 1-4012-5836-0)
- Convergence: Infinite Earths Book One (272 pages, softcover, November 3, 2015, ISBN 1-4012-5837-9)
- Convergence: Infinite Earths Book Two (272 pages, softcover, November 3, 2015, ISBN 1-4012-5838-7)

== In other media ==
"Covergence" is somewhat adapted in the Teen Titans Go! four-parter "Space House". The Teen Titans, consisting of Robin, Raven, Beast Boy, Starfire and Cyborg, and the DC Super Hero Girls, consisting of Wonder Woman, Zatanna, Bumblebee, Supergirl, Green Lantern and Batgirl, receive mysterious invitations for a free vacation in a high-tech Space House floating through the cosmos with no fixed destination. Both teams discover the entire vacation is a trap orchestrated by Brainiac, who lured them there to add them to his cross-multiverse collection of heroes and villains.

== See also ==
- Secret Wars (2015)
