= ZDFkultur =

German free-to-air television channel

- Logo used from 2011 to 2016
- Country: Germany
- Broadcast area: Germany
- Headquarters: Mainz-Lerchenberg, Germany

Programming
- Language: German
- Picture format: 720p HDTV (downscaled to 16:9 576i for the SDTV feed)

Ownership
- Owner: ZDF
- Sister channels: ZDF; ZDFneo; ZDFinfo

History
- Launched: 7 May 2011; 14 years ago
- Replaced: ZDFtheaterkanal
- Closed: 30 September 2016; 9 years ago

Links
- Website: kultur.zdf.de

Availability

Streaming media
- ZDF.de: Watch live

ZDFkultur (stylized as zdf.kultur) was a German free-to-air television channel owned by ZDF. It was launched on 7 May 2011, replacing ZDF theaterkanal. It mainly broadcast music shows, such as Later... with Jools Holland, pop concerts and series from the ZDF archive, but also movies and theatre plays. On 1 May 2012, a high-definition simulcast was launched on satellite. On 22 February 2013, ZDF director Thomas Bellut announced that ZDFkultur would close in the near future, due to cost-saving measures at ZDF. The channel council agreed Bellut's proposal on 8 March 2013. The programming after the closure announcement consisting mostly of old ZDF archive content from the 1970s and 80s, with an annual budget of around €2 million. The channel was finally closed down on 30 September 2016.

== Audience share ==
	January	February	March	April	May	June	July	August	September	October	November	December	Annual average
2011	-	-	-	-	-	-	-	-	-	-	-	-	0.0%
2012	0.1%	0.1%	0.1%	0.1%	0.1%	0.1%	0.1%	0.1%	0.2%	0.1%	0.1%	0.2%	▲0.1%
2013	0.1%	0.2%	0.2%	0.2%	0.2%	0.2%	0.2%	0.2%	0.2%	0.2%	0.2%	0.2%	▲0.2%
2014	0.3%	0.3%	0.3%	0.3%	0.3%	0.2%	0.2%	0.3%	0.3%	0.3%	0.3%	0.3%	▲0.3%
2015	0.3%	0.3%	0.4%	0.4%	0.4%	0.3%	0.4%	0.4%	0.4%	0.3%	0.4%	0.4%	▲0.4%
2016	0.3%	0.3%	0.3%	0.4%	0.4%	0.3%	0.3%	0.4%	0.3%	-	-	-	
