= ZDFtheaterkanal =

German TV channel

- Logo used from 2001 to 2011
- Country: Germany
- Broadcast area: Germany
- Network: ZDF
- Headquarters: Mainz-Lerchenberg, Germany

Programming
- Language: German
- Picture format: 576i (4:3 SDTV)

Ownership
- Owner: ZDF
- Sister channels: ZDF; ZDFdokukanal; ZDFinfokanal

History
- Launched: 9 December 1999; 26 years ago
- Closed: 7 May 2011; 14 years ago
- Replaced by: ZDFkultur

Links
- Website: ewww.zdftheaterkanal.de

ZDFtheaterkanal was a TV station and part of the digital TV package offered by ZDF. The channel was broadcast daily from 9 am until 2 am the following day, starting on 9 December 1999. The broadcasting was stopped on 7 May 2011 in favor of ZDFkultur.

The program was broadcast nationwide via the TV cable network (DVB-C) and the Astra 19.2°E (DVB-S). In addition, the channel was accessible via the IPTV offers Telekom Entertain and Alice as well as with via Zattoo.

In the summer of 2008, plans were presented to convert ZDFtheaterkanal into a cultural channel. On 7 May 2011, at 6:30 am, the new channel ZDFkultur started and replaced ZDFtheaterkanal to cover the topics of music, performing arts, film culture, network culture and gaming. The cut-over took place on 7 May 2011 at 1:20 AM.

ZDFtheaterkanal (as well as the following station ZDFkultur) was directed by Wolfgang Bergmann, previously by Walter Konrad.

== Programming ==
The channel broadcast a program that took into account all areas of the performing arts. These included the broadcasting of stagings, documentaries, portraits and interviews. Since the mid-2000s, the program has been supplemented by other art forms. Thus, music formats such as Later with Jools Holland or concert recordings were broadcast.

Also, ZDF-produced Arte and 3sat programs were rebroadcast, including Kulturzeit, Tracks, Durch die Nacht mit …, Bauerfeind and FOYER.

You could also see older shows like ZDF-Hitparade and Disco as well as occasionally older television series.

=== Programming ===
- Simpsons (Die Simpsons)
- Anne (Das Anna)
- DW Journal (Dw)
