= Disco (TV series) =

Pop music television show of the German network ZDF

- Presented by: Ilja Richter
- Country of origin: West Germany
- No. of episodes: 133

Production
- Running time: 45 minutes

Original release
- Network: ZDF
- Release: 13 February 1971 – 22 November 1982

Disco is a pop music program that aired in West Germany on the ZDF network from 1971 to 1982. It generally aired on the first Saturday of each month at 7:30PM, each show running 45 minutes. 133 shows were produced. The show was hosted by German actor and comedian Ilja Richter. Its lesser known predecessor on ZDF, 4-3-2-1 Hot & Sweet was aired between 1966 and 1970, presenters included Ilja Richter and Suzanne Doucet. Disco generally served a younger pop-oriented audience compared to ZDF's own Hitparade show, and until 1972, its main competitor was Beat-Club (originally patterned after the pure live-act show Ready Steady Go! in the UK, from the late-1960s turning more and more into psychedelic music videos made especially for the invited acts), followed by Musikladen, both on ARD.

Starting in 1984, reruns Disco were shown regularly on ZDF Musikkanal and, after the 1989 closedown of the latter, on 3sat, lasting for a full 25 years. The ZDF Theaterkanal (which is now zdf.kultur) aired repeats of the entire series between 2004 and 2012. In 2007, ZDF Dokukanal began to air reruns, starting with episodes from 1975. Multiple repeats of the series have also been shown on hit24.

The show focused on chart hits current at the time of airing, giving about equal airtime to international pop music and German Schlager. Despite its name, it did not particularly focus on disco music although it featured many disco hits as long as they were chart relevant. (The name of the show was devised before disco as a musical style existed).
