= Machist =

Machist may refer to:

- An exponent of machism
- An exponent of machismo

== See also ==
- Machiste, a DC Comics character
