= Justice League: Warworld =

2023 animated film

- Official release poster
- Directed by: Jeff Wamester
- Written by: Jeremy Adams; Ernie Altbacker; Josie Campbell
- Based on: Justice League by: Gardner Fox
- Produced by: James Krieg; Kimberly S. Moreau
- Starring: Jensen Ackles; Darren Criss; Stana Katic
- Music by: Michael Gatt
- Production companies: Warner Bros. Animation; DC Entertainment
- Distributed by: Warner Bros. Home Entertainment
- Release date: July 25, 2023
- Running time: 89 minutes
- Country: United States

Justice League: Warworld is a 2023 American adult animated superhero film based on the DC Comics superhero team of the same name created by Gardner Fox. Produced by DC Entertainment and Warner Bros. Animation and distributed by Warner Bros. Home Entertainment, it is the seventh film in the DC Animated Movie Universe's second phase, and the 53rd overall installment in the DC Universe Animated Original Movies line.

The film is written by Jeremy Adams, Ernie Altbacker, and Josie Campbell and directed by Jeff Wamester. It stars Jensen Ackles, Darren Criss and Stana Katic. In the film, the Justice League unites together to liberate the gladiatorial world of Warworld. The film was released on home media and digital on July 25, 2023. A sequel titled Justice League: Crisis on Infinite Earths, a three-part superhero film trilogy based on Crisis on Infinite Earths crossover event, was released simultaneously in 2024.

== Plot ==
In the Wild West town of Last Stand, a female gunslinger (Note: Although Wonder Woman was mentioned in Green Lantern: Beware My Power, this is Wonder Woman of Earth-Two from Justice Society: World War II.) enters a standoff between the townsfolk, led by Bat Lash, and bandits led by Jonah Hex. Hex explains the town is populated by gold miners, ranch and farm owners who were supposed to pay "protection interest" to Hex and his men, but they took back and barricaded the bank that had their money. He asks for her help to bring order, but she sides with the townsfolk and saves a little girl from Hex's men and Lash from a wagon loaded with dynamite. Hex calls her a "Wonder" and the townsfolk call her an "Angel". When Bat Lash asks for her name, she is disconcerted that she cannot remember. Later that night, while distracting Hex so the townsfolk can retrieve supplies, she learns that Hex's men have hijacked a train to transport explosives and destroy the townsfolk's fort. She derails the train as Lash evacuates the townsfolk, but Hex kills Lash. In a fit of rage, she beats Hex near death before silently leaving the town.

On Skartaris, the Warlord Travis Morgan takes a mercenary sent by his archenemy, the wizard Deimos, as a slave to work in the mines, but the mercenary offers to take Warlord and his army to Deimos's castle in exchange for freedom and gold. While traveling to the castle, the army is attacked by several monsters, and Warlord's best warriors Mariah Romanova is captured and Machiste is killed. The mercenary struggles with unfamiliar knowledge and memories and along the way sees a vision of an old man who recognizes him. In the castle, after evading several death traps, the mercenary finds a throne room full of treasure with Mariah and a slave woman shackled to the throne. The mercenary, the Warlord, Mariah and the slave woman – who finds a golden lasso – battle Deimos until he flees. The mercenary and slave woman realize they need to find their way home and leave via a portal.

In a 1950s film noir/sci-fi story, at the town of Grovers Mill, federal agents Clark Kent and King Faraday investigate reports of a crashed UFO. They go to a diner to meet with state trooper Bruce Wayne, Diana Prince, and other witnesses. Kent, Wayne, and Prince hear eerie music which no one else can hear. All the diner's patrons are revealed to be White Martians who pursue Kent, Wayne, and Prince to the crashed UFO. Inside, they find a Green Martian, who a hysterical Faraday insists they kill. After Kent subdues Faraday, the room transforms, and they realize that the world around them was an illusion except for them, Faraday, and the Martian, whom they deduce is a prisoner and free.

The Martian informs them that he is J'onn J'onzz, and he reveals to the three who they really are and that the four of them had been taken captive by a Zeta-beam teleporter, (Note: Superman and Batman's abduction was depicted in the post-credits of Legion of Super-Heroes. It would be assumed J'onn J'onzz was captured too and Wonder Woman was taken from her Earth.) with J'onzz's psychic abilities being harnessed to project illusions on the artificial planet Warworld, which is powered by the violence and fear of its prisoners. He had also been attempting to lead them back to reality via telepathic messages. He informs them to leave immediately but Lobo subdues Kent, Wayne, and Prince and brings J'onzz to Mongul, who was searching through the multiverse and taking captives and had hoped J'onzz would have the key to harness Warworld's planet-destroying power.

Seeking to take Warworld for himself, Lobo betrays Mongul as he is about to execute J'onzz. Superman, Batman, and Wonder Woman recover their costumes and fight their way to Mongul's throne room while J'onzz possesses and merges with a White Martian, revealing that the two halves of the key were hidden in the DNA of both Martian races. Possessing both halves, J'onzz uses the key to activate Warworld's self-destruct sequence. A mysterious woman rescues Superman, Batman, and Wonder Woman and teleports them back to safety at the Monitor's satellite just in time before Warworld explodes. She states that Warworld's destruction is nothing compared to the forthcoming Crisis. (Note: The story continues in Justice League: Crisis on Infinite Earths – Part One.)

== Voice cast ==
| Voice actor | Character |
|---|---|
| Jensen Ackles | Bruce Wayne / Batman, "Officer Wayne", "The Mercenary" |
| Stana Katic | Diana Prince / Wonder Woman, "Angel", Slave Woman |
| Darren Criss | Kal-El / Clark Kent / Superman, "Agent Kent" |
| Ike Amadi | J'onn J'onzz / Martian Manhunter (Credited), Long Haul Truck Driver (Uncredited) |
| Troy Baker | Jonah Hex |
| Matt Bomer | "Old Man" |
| Roger Cross | Machiste |
| Brett Dalton | Bat Lash (Credited), Mr. Lang (Uncredited) |
| Trevor Devall | Drifter |
| John DiMaggio | Lobo |
| Robin Atkin Downes | Mongul |
| Frank Grillo | Agent Faraday |
| Rachel Kimsey | Mariah Romanova |
| David Lodge | Sheriff |
| Damian O'Hare | Deimos |
| Teddy Sears | Travis Morgan / Warlord |
| Kari Wahlgren | Harbinger (Credited), Cinnamon (Uncredited), Mrs. Lang (Uncredited) |

== Production ==
=== Development ===
Justice League: Warworld was announced by Warner Bros. Home Entertainment at San Diego Comic-Con 2022, after the premiere of Green Lantern: Beware My Power.

In 2023, the voice cast for the film was revealed and the film was given an R-rating. The film takes inspiration from Action Comics titles Warworld Rising (2022), The Arena (2022), and Warworld Revolution (2022).

=== Writing ===
The film explores three different film genres, western, fantasy, and sci-fi from the 50s. This was done at the suggestion of executive producer Butch Lukic, who wanted to explore different genres after working for years on superhero animation, an idea director Jeff Wamester liked. The overall story model was inspired by King Kong and how it had characters on multiple storylines before converging on the climax. For the Western sequences, Lukic drew inspiration from 60s and 70s Spaghetti Western films, particularly High Plains Drifter, while the fantasy sequences were inspired by films such as Conan the Barbarian.

== Release ==
Justice League: Warworld was released by Warner Bros. Home Entertainment on July 25, 2023. The film was also screened at San Diego Comic-Con on July 21, four days ahead of its release despite also being leaked online. Warworld and other animated DC films were released and labeled as DC Elseworlds.

== Reception ==
On Rotten Tomatoes, the film has an approval rating of 43% based on 7 reviews, with an average rating of 5.00/10. Hayden Mears of IGN rated the film six out of 10, noting it feels like an event film, but lacks the emotional payoffs for a satisfying experience. Sam Stone of Comic Book Resources criticized the film's "anthology" type story, finding the main plotline following Batman and Warlord more interesting than Superman's and Wonder Woman's side stories.
