= ZDFneo =

German free-to-air TV channel

- Logo used since 2017
- Country: Germany
- Headquarters: Mainz, Germany

Programming
- Picture format: 720p (1080p (DVB-T2 only)) (HDTV)

Ownership
- Owner: ZDF
- Key people: Markus Schächter
- Sister channels: ZDF; ZDFinfo

History
- Launched: 1 November 2009; 16 years ago (SD); 30 April 2012; 14 years ago (HD)
- Replaced: ZDFdokukanal

Links
- Website: www.zdfneo.de

Availability

Terrestrial
- Digital terrestrial television: Region dependent

Streaming media
- ZDF.de: Watch live (Germany only)

ZDFneo is a German free-to-air television channel, programmed for an audience aged 25 to 49 to complement the primarily older-skewing main channels of public broadcasters ZDF and ARD. It replaced ZDF's documentary channel ZDFdokukanal on 1 November 2009.

== History ==
On 1 October 2017, the channel was to receive a new on-air design and a new broadcasting logo; this was brought forward to 26 September 2017. The logo and on-air design was created by Julia David.

In March 2026, it was announced that ZDFneo would merge its operations with ARD's similar channel One in 2027, with the channel rebranding as simply Neo and becoming a joint venture between the two public broadcasters.

== Distribution ==
ZDFneo is broadcast (along with the rest of ZDFvision) via DVB-T digital terrestrial television, receivable in most areas of Germany. It is also transmitted in DVB-C through German cable networks, and in DVB-S from the Astra 1H satellite.

Since 30 April 2012, ZDFneo has been broadcast in HD (720p). The channel was initially only scaled up by 576i, since ZDFneo had no HD-capable playout at this time. Since mid-May 2015, the channel is broadcast in native HD quality.

== Programmes ==
ZDFneo's broadcasts mostly consists of comedy and drama series produced in-house. Shows imported from America and the United Kingdom plus a few documentaries, music shows, and movies round out the schedule.

=== Repeats of ZDF programming ===
- Die Deutschen ("The Germans"; history)
- Alisa – Folge deinem Herzen ("Follow your heart"; soap opera)
- Bianca – Wege zum Glück ("The way to happiness"; soap opera)
- Der letzte Zeuge (2009–present)
- Lafer! Lichter! Lecker! ("Lafer, Lichter, delicious!"; talk, cooking)
- Terra X (history)
- Abenteuer Wissen ("Knowledge Adventure"; science, history)
- Neues aus der Anstalt ("News from the (mental) institution"; cabaret)
- Helen Dorn (2014–present)
- Heute Show (satire)
- Lena: Liebe meines Lebens ("Lena: Love of my Life"; soap opera)
- Neo Magazin Royale (late-night satire talk show; continuation of NeoMagazin mit Jan Böhmermann which was aired on ZDFneo)

=== Original programming ===
- Bambule (culture/current affairs)
- Comedy Lab (comedy)
- Crystal Wall (romance-crime drama)
- Hochzeitsfieber! ("Wedding Fever!"; living)
- Iss oder quizz (game show)
- neoLeben (living)
- Neo Magazin (Talk show)
- neoMusik (music)
- Schulz & Böhmermann (talk show)
- Der Straßenchor ("The Street Choir"; music)
- Süper Tiger Show (comedy)

=== Imported series ===
- 100 Code (2016-2017)
- 30 Rock (2009-2015)
- Agatha Raisin (2017–present)
- Being Erica (Being Erica - Alles auf Anfang) (2011)
- Candice Renoir (2016–present)
- Clan (2015)
- Code 37 (2014)
- Dawson's Creek (2011-2012)
- Death in Paradise (2012–present)
- Dicte (2014–present)
- Dirty Sexy Money (2011-2012)
- Endeavour (Der junge Inspektor Morse) (2017–present)
- Fargo (2016–present)
- Father Brown (2014–present)
- Free Agents (comedy; titled Free Agents – Zweisam einsam, engl. Free Agents – Twosome lonesome) (2010-2011)
- From Darkness (2017)
- George Gently (George Gently - Der Unbestechliche) (2011)
- Gidseltagningen (Countdown Copenhagen/Below the Surface) (2017–present)
- Hart to Hart (drama; titled Hart aber herzlich)
- Hooten & the Lady (2017–present)
- How Not to Live Your Life (comedy) (2010-2011)
- Huff (drama)
- Hustle (drama; titled Hustle – Unehrlich währt am längsten, engl. Hustle – Dishonest it works much longer )
- In Plain Sight (drama)
- In Treatment (drama)
- Jack Taylor (2015-2016, 2018–present)
- Line of Duty (2015–present)
- Luther (psychological crime drama)
- Mad Men (drama)
- Magic City (2013-2015)
- Magnum, P.I. (Magnum) (2011-2015)
- Miami Vice (drama)
- Midsomer Murders (detective drama; titled Inspector Barnaby)
- Mr Selfridge (2014-2016)
- New Tricks (New Tricks - Die Krimispezialisten) (2017–present)
- No Offence (2016–present)
- Orange Is the New Black (2017–present)
- Outcast (2017–present)
- Ray Donovan (2016–present)
- Safe House (2016–present)
- Scott & Bailey (2012–present)
- Seinfeld (2009-2012)
- Spooks (drama; titled Spooks – Im Visier des MI5, engl. Spooks – In sight of the MI5)
- Star Trek (Sci Fi; titled Raumschiff Enterprise, engl. Spaceship Enterprise)
- Taking the Flak (dramedy; titled Taking the Flak – Reporter auf Kriegsfuß, engl. Taking the Flak – Reporters at war)
- The Aliens (2016, 2018)
- The Big C (The Big C ... und jetzt ich!) (2011-2014)
- The Fades (2012-2014)
- The Fall (The Fall – Tod in Belfast) (2016-2017)
- The Fear (2012) (2014–present)
- The Inspector Lynley Mysteries (mystery)
- The Missing (2017–present)
- Wayward Pines (2017–present)
- Weeds (Weeds - Kleine Deals unter Nachbarn) (2010-2012)

== Logos ==
ZDFneo (2009–2017)

ZDFneo HD (2012–2017)

ZDFneo (since 26 September 2017)

== Audience share ==
=== Germany ===
	January	February	March	April	May	June	July	August	September	October	November	December	Annual average
2009	-	-	-	-	-	-	-	-	-	-	-	-	
2010	-	-	-	-	-	-	-	-	-	-	-	-	
2011	0.3%	0.3%	0.3%	0.3%	0.3%	0.3%	0.3%	0.4%	0.4%	0.4%	0.4%	0.5%	0.4%
2012	0.5%	0.5%	0.5%	0.6%	0.7%	0.7%	0.7%	0.6%	0.7%	0.7%	0.7%	0.8%	▲0.6%
2013	0.8%	0.8%	0.9%	1.0%	0.9%	1.0%	1.0%	0.9%	1.1%	1.1%	1.2%	1.2%	▲1.0%
2014	1.2%	1.2%	1.1%	1.2%	1.3%	1.2%	1.3%	1.4%	1.5%	1.4%	1.3%	1.4%	▲1.3%
2015	1.4%	1.5%	1.6%	1.6%	1.6%	1.7%	1.7%	1.7%	1.7%	1.5%	1.6%	1.8%	▲1.6%
2016	1.5%	1.6%	1.5%	1.7%	2.0%	2.0%	2.3%	2.5%	2.4%	2.4%	2.6%	2.4%	▲2.1%
2017	2.5%	2.7%	2.9%	2.5%	3.0%	3.0%	2.8%	3.2%	3.3%	2.9%			
