= Damian O'Hare =

Irish actor (born 1977)

- Born: 13 August 1977 (age 49); Belfast, Northern Ireland
- Occupation: Actor
- Years active: 2002–present
- Spouse: Georgie Hurford-Jones (m. 2014)

Damian O'Hare (born 13 August 1977) is an Irish actor. He is best known for his role as Lieutenant Gillette in Pirates of the Caribbean: The Curse of the Black Pearl and Pirates of the Caribbean: On Stranger Tides.

== Career ==
O'Hare started his acting career in 2002, appearing as Sean Weir in the Ultimate Force episode "The Killing of a One-Eyed Bookie". He made his feature film debut as Lieutenant Gillette in the 2003 fantasy supernatural swashbuckler film Pirates of the Caribbean: The Curse of the Black Pearl. He reprised his role as Gillette in Pirates of the Caribbean: On Stranger Tides.

From 2008 to 2009, O'Hare appeared in the seventh season of the medical drama series The Royal. He appeared in the 2008 French-British horror film The Broken. In 2009, he was cast as Rory Wallace in the comedy drama series Taking the Flak. In 2012, O'Hare had a recurring role in the miniseries Hatfields & McCoys portraying Ellison Hatfield. In 2013, he appeared in the third season of the Western period drama Hell on Wheels, playing Declan Toole. From 2016 to 2017, O'Hare voiced John Constantine in the superhero animated series Justice League Action.

In 2017, O'Hare appeared as George Hall in the historical war family drama film Zoo. From 2018 to 2019, he starred alongside Matt Ryan in the superhero action animated web series Constantine: City of Demons, voicing Chas Chandler.

== Filmography ==
=== Film ===
Year	Title	Role	Notes
2003	Pirates of the Caribbean: The Curse of the Black Pearl	Lieutenant Gillette	
2005	Titanic: Birth of a Legend	Thomas Andrews	Television film, documentary
2007	Fractured	Harry Henson	Short film
2008	The Broken	Anthony	
2011	Pirates of the Caribbean: On Stranger Tides	Lieutenant Gillette	
2016	Whadd'ya Say?	Michael	Short film
2017	Zoo	George Hall	
2020	Come Away	Doctor	
2020	Stargirl	Leo's Dad	
2022	Constantine: The House of Mystery	Ashox, Chas Chandler (voice)	Short film; direct-to-video
2023	Justice League: Warworld	Deimos (voice)	Direct-to-video

=== Television ===
Year	Title	Role	Notes
2002	Ultimate Force	Sean Weir	Episode: "The Killing of a One-Eyed Bookie"
2003, 2007	The Bill	Kieran Thompson, Scott Williamson	3 episodes
2003	P.O.W.	Sam Shanklin	Episode: "Episode #1.1"
2003	Foyle's War	Sean O'Halloran	Episode: "Among the Few"
2004	Red Cap	Jason Dwyer	Episode: "Fighting Fit"
2004	If...	Andrew Holland	
2004	Holby City	Dean Clarke	Episode: "Truth Will Out"
2006	The Wild West	Bill Ollinger	Episode: "Billy the Kid"
2007	Casualty	Mark Savey	Episode: "Combat Indicators"
2008	Doctors	Sid Martin	Episode: "A Step Too Far"
2008–2009	The Royal	Nick Burnett	10 episodes
2009	Taking the Flak	Rory Wallace	5 episodes
2012	Hatfields & McCoys	Ellison Hatfield	2 episodes
2013	CSI: Crime Scene Investigation	Jonah Drake	Episode: "In Vino Veritas"
2013	Hell on Wheels	Declean	4 episodes
2016	Agent Carter	Nick Driscoll	Episode: "The Edge of Mystery"
2016	NCIS	Allen Kane	Episode: "Dead Letter"
2016	Timeless	George Washington	Episode: "The Capture of Benedict Arnold"
2016–2018	The Adventures of Puss in Boots	Tranche, Tranche's Wife, Blueberry (voice)	3 episodes
2016–2017	Justice League Action	John Constantine, Abnegazar, Mr. Anderson (voice)	4 episodes
2018–2019	Constantine: City of Demons	Chas Chandler (voice)	5 episodes
2020	Cleopatra in Space	Mortimer (voice)	Episode: "Parasites"
2022	Power Book IV: Force	Ioan	2 episodes
2022	We Baby Bears	Carrot, Castle Guard (voice)	Episode: "Excalibear"
2023	1923	Captain Hurley	1 episode
2023	Leverage: Redemption	Arthur Wilde	Season 2, 3 episodes
2024	Manhunt	Thomas Eckert	Miniseries
2025	Watson	Andrew Tanner	Episode: "Redcoat"

=== Video games ===
Year	Title	Role	Notes
2007	Heavenly Sword	Additional voices	
2009	Risen	Olf, Delgado, Dirk, Clay Dytar, Jorgensen, Ricardo, Stan, Vasilli	English version
2011	Killzone 3	Helghast Soldiers	
2011	Brink	Resistance	
2011	The Witcher 2: Assassins of Kings	Additional voices	English version
2012	Assassin's Creed III	Redcoat, New York Revolutionary	
2013	Assassin's Creed IV: Black Flag	Additional voices	
2014	Assassin's Creed: Rogue	Additional voices	
2016	Mafia III	Additional voices	

=== Theatre ===
- The Magic Toyshop (Shared Experience 2002)
- Small Change (Crucible Theatre, Sheffield 2002)
- Ghosts (Connal Morrison Lyric Theatre, Belfast)
- The Countess (Criterion Theatre, London 2005)
- A Whistle in the Dark (Manchester Royal Exchange & Tricycle Theatre, London 2006)
- Salt Meets Wound (Theatre503, London 2007)
- The Revenger's Tragedy (Manchester Royal Exchange, 2008)
- The Grapes of Wrath (Chichester Festival Theatre & English Touring Theatre, 2009)
- Double Feature (National Theatre Paintframe, London, 2011)
