= ZDF Musikkanal =

German television channel

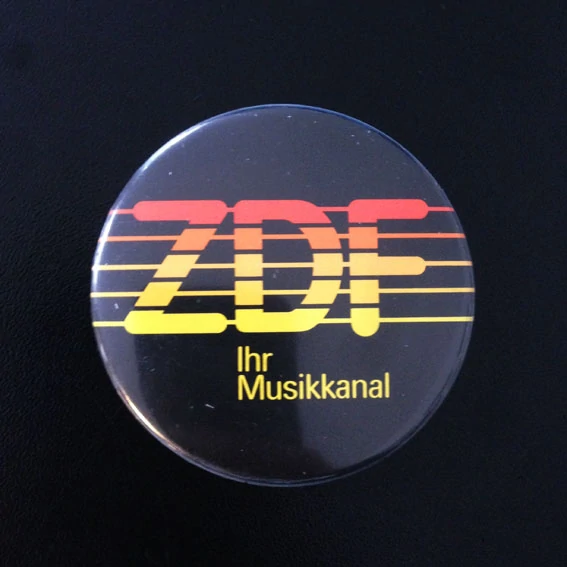
- Country: West Germany
- Broadcast area: West Germany
- Headquarters: Mainz, Germany

Programming
- Language: German

History
- Launched: 1 January 1984; 42 years ago
- Closed: 30 November 1993; 32 years ago
- Replaced by: 3sat

Links
- Website: www.zdf.de

ZDF Musikkanal was the name of a television channel operated by ZDF which had started broadcasting on 1 January 1984 as part of the cable pilot projects in West Germany. The station broadcast a moderated programme with a thematic focus on music. The programmes broadcast came almost exclusively from the archives of the ZDF main programme.

The ZDF Musikkanal remained on air as an independent programme until 31 December 1988, and from January 1989 it was broadcast as a programme window before the 3sat programme and was later fully integrated into 3sat. Until then, however, it remained an independent programme brand for music programmes within 3sat until the end of 1993. With the cessation of broadcasting on 30 November 1993 of the cultural channel Eins Plus organized by ARD and the associated participation of ARD in 3sat from 1 December 1993, an extensive programme reform followed, as a result of which the ZDF music channel's programme line was discontinued.

Initially, the station was broadcast only in the so-called cable pilot projects: from 1 January 1984 in the cable pilot project of Ludwigshafen am Rhein, from April 1984 also in Munich, from 1 June 1985 in Dortmund, from 28 August 1985 in Berlin and later in the regular cable network. With the abandonment of the program's independence, the station was available throughout Europe as part of 3sat via the satellites Astra 1A and DFS-Kopernikus from 1989 onwards.

In the context of independence, a three-hour evening programme was initially offered daily, later this was extended to up to 6 hours between 16:00 and 22:00. With the change to 3sat the station was only reduced from 14:30 to 17:20 on weekdays, on weekends there were no more transmission distances. Recurring programmes were ZDF-Hitparade, Disco or P. I. T. – Peter-Illmann-Treff. One of the few in-house productions was the studio programme Gast im Studio. Folk music programmes or classical music were also included in the programme. Isolated series with a focus on music were also broadcast, such as the ZDF production from 1980 ...und die Tuba bläst der Huber broadcast in 1988.
