= Taking the Flak =

- Genre: Comedy drama
- Created by: Tira Shubart; Sandra Jones; Jon Rolph
- Directed by: Jon Rolph; Adam Miller
- Starring: Martin Jarvis; Doon Mackichan; Bruce Mackinnon; Joanna Brookes; Damian O'Hare; Lydiah Gitachu; Kobna Holdbrook-Smith; Lucy Chalkley; Harry Lloyd
- Country of origin: United Kingdom
- No. of series: 1
- No. of episodes: 7

Production
- Producers: Jon Rolph; Tira Shubart
- Production locations: Arusha, Tanzania & Nakuru, Kenya
- Running time: 1 x 60 minutes, 6 x 30 minutes

Original release
- Network: BBC Two
- Release: 8 July – 19 August 2009

Taking the Flak is a comedy drama which aired on BBC Two in mid-2009. It is set in a fictional Central African country that is the middle of a civil war. A team of BBC journalists arrive from London, to the annoyance of the local BBC stringer Harry Chambers (Bruce Mackinnon), and send reports back to BBC News in London. The series has been described as "a bit like Drop the Dead Donkey meets The Constant Gardener".

The series is written by Tira Shubart and Jon Rolph. The script consultant is Sandra Jones. It stars Martin Jarvis, Doon Mackichan, Bruce Mackinnon, Kobna Holdbrook-Smith, Damian O'Hare, Joanna Brookes, Lydiah Gitachu, Lucy Chalkley and Harry Lloyd.

The theme music is a remix of David Lowe's BBC News Theme.

In Australia, this program aired each Thursday at 10pm on ABC2 from 7 January, until 18 February 2010 (along with the ABC iView catch-up service).

== Plot ==
Taking the Flak is set in the fictional Central African Republic of Karibu, which is in the middle of a war. The local BBC news reporter, or 'stringer', Harry Chambers, sees the war as chance to make a name for himself as he is the only journalist in the country. However, as the war becomes more important, the BBC sends in more journalists to cover it, knocking Harry out of the spotlight. These include David Bradburn, the BBC's Chief Foreign Editor, who knows very little about the area, but he still appears on screen as authoritative.

Also part of the BBC team is Jane Thomason, the news producer has to control the reporting on the ground. She has to deal with the staff back in London, originally led by Nigel Bagwell in the first episode, but in the rest of the series is led by the young Alexander Taylor-Pierce. She also has problems with her main cameraman Jack, whom she is having an affair with. After the first episode, Jack leaves Jane to go back home to his wife to help with her IVF treatment. In the third episode, she gets a new cameraman, Rory Wallace, who can film almost anything under any circumstances. Another member of the BBC team is Margaret Hollis, who is seen by the rest of the TV crew as a rival because she works for radio, as a reporter for the BBC World Service. Unlike the others, she has not had any affairs. Part of the problem is due to medical issues, including stomach and bowel problems.

There are also civilians who are also involved with the reporting. These include Joyful Sifuri, the local fixer who worked with Harry before the war and now helps the entire BBC crew with his local knowledge; Grace Matiko the receptionist at the hotel where the crew are staying and Harry's on-off girlfriend; and Samantha Cunningham Fleming a posh charity worker who sometimes helps in finding stories but whom everyone else finds annoying.

== Production ==
Taking The Flak was filmed around Arusha, Tanzania, in the autumn of 2008 although episode one (the pilot) was filmed in January 2007 in Nakuru, Kenya, with a working title of The Calais Rules. Two of the writers, Shubart and Jones, are journalists, and the series was filmed by an award-winning news cameraman. The show also features guest appearances from BBC journalists such as George Alagiah, Sophie Raworth, Fiona Bruce, Bill Turnbull, Sian Williams, Emily Maitlis and Peter Sissons.

Guest stars have included Ruby Wax, Sean Power, Rhashan Stone, Rosalind Ayres, Rufus Wright and David Mulwa.

Supporting artists were both Kenyan and Tanzanian. Others were people employed from the local communities around the areas of filming.
