= ZDFdokukanal =

German TV channel

- Logo used from 2001 to 2009
- Country: Germany
- Broadcast area: Germany
- Headquarters: Mainz-Lerchenberg, Germany

Programming
- Language: German
- Picture format: 576i (4:3 SDTV)

Ownership
- Owner: ZDF
- Sister channels: ZDF; ZDFinfokanal; ZDFtheaterkanal

History
- Launched: 1 April 2000; 26 years ago
- Closed: 31 October 2009; 16 years ago
- Replaced by: ZDFneo

Links
- Website: www.zdfdokukanal.de

Availability

Terrestrial
- DVB-T: Various; region dependent

ZDFdokukanal was a TV station which operated between 1 April 2000 and 31 October 2009 and was part of the digital TV package offered by ZDF.

== Distribution ==
The program was broadcast nationwide via TV cable networks (DVB-C) and the satellite Astra 19.2°E (DVB-S). In the regions where DVB-T was available, ZDFdokukanal could be also received via antenna between 9 pm and 6 am, alternating with KiKa. It was also included in the IPTV offer of some DSL providers.

== Programming ==
The station broadcast documentaries on nature, science, history and society.

In May 2009, the station was transformed into a youth and family channel, with fewer documentaries and more entertainment programming. On 19 August 2009, ZDF announced that the station would cease broadcasting as of 31 October 2009. ZDFdokukanal was then replaced by ZDFneo.

Since the 2004 Summer Olympics in Athens, ARD and ZDF have been using their digital TV channels EinsExtra, EinsFestival, ZDFdokukanal and ZDFinfokanal to report additionally from the Olympic Games. This opportunity was also used at the 2008 European Football Championship to enable more matches to be broadcast.
