= Warlord (DC Comics) =

Character appearing in American comic books published by DC Comics

The Warlord
- The Warlord #67 (March 1983), cover art by Mike Grell.

Publication information
- Publisher: DC Comics
- First appearance: 1st Issue Special #8 (November 1975)
- Created by: Mike Grell

In-story information
- Alter ego: Travis Morgan
- Place of origin: Skartaris
- Team affiliations: United States Air Force
- Abilities: fencer and expert marksman.
The Warlord
Publication information
- Schedule: Monthly
- Format: Ongoing series
- Genre: Sword and sorcery, Science fantasy
- Publication date: January–February 1976 – September 2010
- No. of issues: (vol. 1): 133 and 6 Annuals (vol. 2): 6 (vol. 3): 10 (vol. 4): 16
- Main character: Warlord
Creative team
- Written by: List: (vol. 1) Mike Grell, Cary Burkett, Michael Fleisher (vol. 2) Mike Grell (vol. 3) Bruce Jones (vol. 4) Mike Grell
- Penciller: List: (vol. 1) Mike Grell, Mark Texeira, Jan Duursema, Dan Jurgens, Pat Broderick, Rich Buckler, Alan Kupperberg, Ron Randall, Mike Chen, Adam Kubert, Rick Stasi, Andy Kubert, Paris Cullins, Jerry Bingham, Art Thibert, Pablo Marcos (vol. 2) Dameon Willich (vol. 3) Bart Sears (vol. 4) Joe Prado, Chad Hardin
- Inker: List: (vol. 1) Mike Grell, Vince Colletta, Mike DeCarlo, Tom Mandrake, Dan Adkins, Pablo Marcos (vol. 2) Rick Hoberg, Tim Burgard (vol. 3) Bart Sears (vol. 4) Joe Prado, Chad Hardin
Collected editions
- Warlord: The Savage Empire: ISBN 1-56389-024-0
- Showcase Presents: Warlord: ISBN 1-4012-2473-3

The Warlord is a sword and sorcery character appearing in American comic books published by DC Comics. Created by writer-artist Mike Grell, he debuted in 1st Issue Special #8 (November 1975). The titular character, American military pilot Travis Morgan, assumes the name "Warlord" as he fights for the freedom of the people of Skartaris.

== Development ==
Grell described the Warlord's genesis "as a comic strip called Savage Empire... Savage Empire was born of my admiration for Hal Foster's Prince Valiant and Burne Hogarth's Tarzan, combined with my fascination with archaeology and lost civilizations". Grell described pitching his idea to DC Comics: "I completely revised the concept from Savage Empire into The Warlord. The story of an archeologist who stumbles through a time portal and winds up in Atlantis became the story of US spy pilot whose SR-71 is damaged while on a mission over Russia and plunges through an opening at the North pole into the world at the center on the earth, where creatures of from mythology and Earth's ancient past co-exist amid fantastic cities and leftovers of the civilization of Atlantis... drawing on many sources, including my own US Air Force experiences to lend a note of authenticity to the characters background. Choosing the new setting was easy, as a kid one of my favorite books was Jules Verne's 1864 classic Journey to the Center of the Earth, I [also] drew on...The Smoky God, The Hollow Earth, and Edgar Rice Burroughs' Pellucidar series".

== Publication history ==
The character the Warlord debuted in 1st Issue Special #8 (cover-dated November 1975). The decision to give the Warlord his own series had already been made by the time his 1st Issue Special debut went into production.

He starred in The Warlord #1 (February 1976), followed by an eight-month hiatus after issue #2, picking up again with #3 (November 1976). The title lasted 133 issues until Winter 1988. Creator Mike Grell wrote and drew the comic for six years, handing over the art chores after issue #59 (July 1982). Issues #53 through #71 were ghost-written by Grell's then-wife Sharon Wright.

=== Backup features ===
A continuation of Jack Kirby's OMAC series, by Jim Starlin, was featured as a backup for several issues (#37–39 and #42–47). Arak, Son of Thunder, created by Roy Thomas and Ernie Colón, first appeared in a special insert in The Warlord #48 (August 1981). Claw the Unconquered appeared in a two–part backup feature in issues #48–49 by Jack C. Harris and Thomas Yeates. Dragonsword was a backup feature by Paul Levitz and Yeates which appeared in #51–54 (November 1981–February 1982). Arion, a sword and sorcery title by writer Paul Kupperberg and artist Jan Duursema, began as a six–page backup feature in The Warlord #55 (March 1982). Another backup feature was The Barren Earth by writer Gary Cohn and artist Ron Randall, which was concluded in a four–issue limited series. A Bonus Book in issue #131 (September 1988) featured artist Rob Liefeld's first work for DC.

=== Volume 2 ===
A six-issue miniseries ran cover-dated January to June 1992. It was written by Mike Grell and penciled by Dameon Willich, with inks by Rick Hoberg (#1-3) and Tim Burgard (#4-6).

=== Volume 3 ===
DC attempted to update The Warlord in 2006 with Bruce Jones writing and Bart Sears providing the art. This series restarted the concept, beginning with Travis Morgan arriving in Skartaris. The series left a number of story points unanswered as issue #9 finished on a cliffhanger, while the tenth and final issue had a standalone story set sometime in the future.

=== Volume 4 ===
The Warlord returned in an ongoing series written by Mike Grell in time for the original series' 35th anniversary. The series started in April 2009, featuring art by Joe Prado and Chad Hardin. It ran for 16 issues.

== Fictional character biography ==
In the savage world of Skartaris, life is a constant struggle for survival. Here, beneath an unblinking orb of eternal sunlight, one simple law prevails: If you let down your guard for an instant you will soon be very dead.

— 1st Issue Special #8

Vietnam War veteran Travis Morgan is flying a SR-71 reconnaissance mission in 1969 over the North Pole when his plane crosses through a hole in the Earth's crust, entering the ancient subterranean realm of Skartaris. After surviving a crash landing, Morgan is captured and enslaved by Deimos, the tyrannical sorcerer-king of Thera; he foments a slave uprising to reach the safety of the peaceful kingdom of Shamballah. Wielding his .44 AutoMag pistol and taught swordsmanship by Shamballah's Princess (later Queen) Tara, Travis takes on the mantle of "Warlord" and battles a variety of dangerous opponents and wicked kings, with Deimos becoming his most dangerous and recurring adversary.

In his quest to bring universal peace to Skartaris, the Warlord was usually aided by companions such as Machiste, native warrior Shakira, Russian scientist and fencer Mariah Romanova, and his sorceress daughter Jennifer Morgan. In one story arc, Morgan even manages to return to his own world and becomes the U.S. president.

Although Warlord has a superficial resemblance to the DC character Oliver Queen, he is based more upon his creator Mike Grell, who was a former member of the Air Force. Grell is caricatured in Warlord's first appearance, 1st Issue Special #8, sporting The Warlord's signature shaggy goatee. Grell and editor Jack C. Harris made a metafictional appearance in the story "Gambit" in The Warlord #35 (July 1980).

Volume 4 of the series begins with an explorer finding preserved dinosaur remains in the Himalayas. She takes the head of one to a doctor and an expedition is set up to retrieve more samples. The team is spotted by the Chinese government and flee into the caves after losing several members. They discover a portal and after walking through find themselves in Skartaris, where they encounter Travis Morgan. Morgan is attacked by a giant bird and kills it with the help of Shakira. Refugees enter Shamballah and Morgan discovers that a new god has taken over the Shadow Kingdom and has overrun Kiro, Machiste's homeland. One of the refugees is injured and carries a gunshot wound.

Travis later battles his son Joshua, also known as Tinder, who kills him and assumes the Warlord title.

== Other versions ==
An alternate universe version of Warlord appears in Flashpoint. This version is a pirate captain.

== In other media ==
=== Television ===
The Warlord appears in the Justice League Unlimited episode "Chaos at the Earth's Core", voiced by Paul Guilfoyle. This version enlists Green Lantern, Stargirl, S.T.R.I.P.E., and Supergirl in a desperate bid to fight Deimos, who has formed a temporary alliance with members of the Legion of Doom to obtain advanced weaponry in return for stealing the "Great Stone", a sacred relic of Shamballah that is actually a large piece of Kryptonite. With their aid, Warlord defeats Deimos and his army, bringing peace to Skartaris before ordering the only entrance to his home sealed up permanently so that no outsider can ever find it again.

=== Film ===
The Warlord appears in Justice League: Warworld, voiced by Teddy Sears.

=== Video games ===
The Warlord appears as a character summon in Scribblenauts Unmasked: A DC Comics Adventure.

=== Merchandise ===
- In 1982, Warlord received a 5.5" action figure in the Remco line "Lost World of The Warlord".
- In 2007, Warlord received an action figure in Series 4 of DC Direct's "First Appearance" figures.
- In 2010, the Justice League Unlimited incarnation of Warlord received an action figure in the DC Universe: Justice League Unlimited Fan Collection.

== Collected editions ==
- DC Comics reprinted several early stories from The Warlord in DC Special Blue Ribbon Digest #10 (June 1981). This digest size collection included a new wraparound painted cover by Mike Grell and an introduction.
- DC’s First Issue Specials collects 1st Issue Special #8, 272 pages, March 2020, ISBN 978-1779501776
- The Warlord: The Savage Empire (1991) - collects 1st Issue Special #8 and The Warlord #1–10 and 12, November 1991, 240 pages, ISBN 978-1563890246
- Showcase Presents: The Warlord (2009) - collects 1st Issue Special #8 and The Warlord #1–28, September 2009, 528 pages, ISBN 978-1401224738
- The Warlord by Mike Grell Omnibus vol. 1 collects 1st Issue Special #8 and The Warlord #1–36, December 2025, 736 pages ISBN 978-1799505525
- DC Through the 80s: The End of Eras collects The Warlord #42, 520 pages, December 2020, ISBN 978-1779500878
- DC Through the 80s: The Experiments collects the Arak and Arion stories from The Warlord #48 and 55, 504 pages, May 2021, ISBN 978-1779507099
- Warlord: The Saga - collects The Warlord vol. 4 #1–6, March 2010, 144 pages, ISBN 978-1401226510
- Countdown Special: OMAC #1 (2008) - collects OMAC backup stories from The Warlord #37–39 as well as OMAC #1 and DC Comics Presents #61.
