= Machiste =

- Machiste as depicted in Warlord #119 (July 1987). Art by Ron Randall.

Publication information
- Publisher: DC Comics
- First appearance: Warlord #2 (March 1976)
- Created by: Mike Grell

In-story information
- Alter ego: Machiste
- Place of origin: Skartaris
- Abilities: Expert swordsman

Machiste is a supporting character in Warlord, a sword and sorcery comic book published by DC Comics. He first appeared in Warlord #2 (March 1976), and was created by Mike Grell.

== Fictional character biography ==
Machiste is the wandering king of Kiro in the realm of Skartaris. He meets Travis Morgan while they are serving as galley slaves aboard the ship Gyrfalcon. They quickly become friends and lead the Gyrfalcon's gladiators in a rebellion against Deimos, the king of Thera.

Warlord #2, art by Mike Grell.

After Deimos' defeat, Machiste returns to Kiro and is possessed by a demon imprisoned in an ancient axe. He is freed after Morgan cuts off his right hand, which wields the axe, and replaces his hand with a spike-studded mace. During this time, he meets Mariah Romanova, a Moscow University archaeology student and Olympic fencer who accompanied Morgan to Skartaris, and shaves his head because his crown does not fit comfortably over his hair.

Machiste as depicted in Warlord #7 (July 1977). Art by Mike Grell.

Machiste later leaves Kiro with Morgan and Mariah and is transported into the past alongside the latter, where they enter a relationship and meet the centaur Eran Shadowstorm, the wizard Mongo Ironhand, and the werewolf Rostov. After returning to the present, the two join Morgan in his war against New Atlantis and later break up, but remain friends.

In Secret Six, Machiste is the ruler of a land that Bane attempts to conquer.

== Other versions ==
An alternate universe version of Machiste appears in Flashpoint. This version is a member of Deathstroke's pirate crew before being killed by Aquaman.

== In other media ==
=== Television ===
- Machiste appears in the Justice League Unlimited episode "Chaos at the Earth's Core", voiced by an uncredited Phil LaMarr.
- M'Chiste, a character inspired by Machiste, appears in Young Justice, voiced by Bryton James. This version is an Atlantean purist and ally of Ocean Master.

=== Film ===
- Machiste makes a non-speaking cameo appearance in Justice League: The Flashpoint Paradox.
- Machiste appears in Justice League: Warworld, voiced by Roger Cross.

=== Merchandise ===
Machiste received an action figure in Remco's 1982 toyline "Lost World of the Warlord".
