= Deimos (character) =

- Deimos as depicted in Who's Who in the DC Universe #6 (August 1985). Art by Mike Grell.

Publication information
- Publisher: DC Comics
- First appearance: 1st Issue Special #8 (November 1975)
- Created by: Mike Grell

In-story information
- Alter ego: Deimos
- Species: Homo Magi
- Place of origin: Skartaris
- Abilities: See powers and abilities

Deimos is a fictional character appearing in DC Comics publications and related media, commonly as a recurring adversary for the superhero Warlord. He is a wicked sorcerer created by Mike Grell debuting in 1st Issue Special #8 (November 1975), and is a distinct character from the Olympian god of the same name, a different DC Comics character who is an enemy of Wonder Woman.

== Fictional character biography ==
Deimos is a high priest of the kingdom of Thera who uses knowledge hidden in the legendary Scrolls of Blood to ascend to the Theran throne. Not content with a single city-state, he plots to conquer all of Skartaris, only to be foiled by Travis Morgan—also known as the Warlord. Initially, Deimos uses advanced New Atlantean science to achieve his ends, later utilizing black magic.

Deimos is killed by Morgan after kidnapping the hero's paramour, Tara. However, he is soon resurrected by one of his lackeys using the Mask of Life. After being resurrected by the Mask of Life, Deimos gains immortality and the ability to transform into a serpent or dragon. Deimos kidnaps and clones Morgan's son Joshua, but Morgan kills both the Joshua clone and Deimos.

Deimos is resurrected several more times before striking a bargain with the Evil One. The Evil One returns Deimos to life for a final time, but he loses the abilities he gained from the Mask of Life. Morgan and Deimos enter combat for the last time, with Morgan killing Deimos.

Deimos returns in the 2015 crossover storyline Convergence, where Brainiac captures him and residents of other doomed universes and forces them to engage in deadly combat. The heroes of Earth-2 soon encounter the hidden city of Skartaris and form an alliance with Deimos to overthrow Brainiac. They are later betrayed when Deimos reveals he has captured various time travellers and intends to use their power to defeat Brainiac and recreate the multiverse in his image. He is challenged by heroes from all worlds and nearly defeats them all, but is killed by Hal Jordan.

== Powers and abilities ==
Deimos had no inherent powers, utilizing Atlantean technology and pretending to be a sorcerer. After dying and being revived by the Mask of Life, he gains immortality and the ability to transform into a dragon. He loses these abilities after being revived once more by the Evil One.

== In other media ==
- Deimos appears in the Justice League Unlimited episode "Chaos at the Earth's Core", voiced by Douglas Dunning.
- Deimos appears in Justice League: Warworld, voiced by Damian O'Hare.
- In 1982, Deimos received an action figure in the Remco toyline "Lost World of the Warlord".
- In 2011, Deimos received an action figure in Mattel's Justice League Unlimited line.
