= ZDFinfo =

German free-to-air TV channel

- Logo used since 2011
- Country: Germany
- Broadcast area: Germany
- Headquarters: Mainz, Germany

Programming
- Language: German
- Picture format: 1080p HDTV (downscaled to 720p for digital satellite and cable)

Ownership
- Owner: ZDF
- Sister channels: ZDF; ZDFneo

History
- Launched: 27 August 1997 (as ZDFinfokanal); 5 September 2011 (as ZDFinfo)
- Former names: ZDF Infokanal

Links
- Website: www.zdf.de/zdfinfo

Availability

Terrestrial
- Digital terrestrial television: Various; region dependent

Streaming media
- ZDF.de: Watch live

ZDFinfo is a German free-to-air documentary television channel owned by ZDF. It was launched on 27 August 1997 as ZDFinfokanal, and it became ZDFinfo on 5 September 2011. On 1 May 2012, a high-definition simulcast the channel was launched.

ZDF offered another documentary channel, ZDFdokukanal, between 2000 and 2009.

In March 2026, as part of a treaty between ARD and ZDF to consolidate their channel operations in 2027, it was announced that ZDFinfo would become a joint venture between the two broadcasters under the name Info.
