= DMAX (German TV channel) =

- Country: Germany
- Broadcast area: Germany, Austria and Switzerland
- Headquarters: Munich, Germany

Programming
- Picture format: 1080i HDTV (downscaled to 576i for the SD feed)

Ownership
- Owner: Warner Bros. Discovery International
- Parent: Warner Bros. Discovery EMEA
- Sister channels: Animal Planet; Discovery Channel; Eurosport 1 Eurosport 2 Eurosport 2 Xtra; TLC

History
- Launched: 1 September 2006; 19 years ago
- Replaced: XXP (2001–2006)

Links
- Website: dmax.de

Availability

Terrestrial
- DVB-T2 (Germany): Various; region dependent (HD / encrypted)

DMAX is a German free-to-air television channel run by Warner Bros. Discovery. It was the first DMAX channel and started in 2006.

The channel airs reports, documentaries, real-life programs and lifestyle magazines. As the channel is licensed as a "full program" channel, DMAX is obliged to broadcast the two-minute news program DMAX News, Monday to Friday at around 11:10 p.m. and 12:10 a.m.

== History ==
DMAX is the successor to the television station XXP, which was taken over by the US media group Discovery Inc. in January 2006 at 98%. The remaining two percent remained with the former main shareholders dctp and Spiegel TV. On September 1, 2006, XXP was merged into the new channel DMAX. In 2007, Spiegel TV GmbH and Alexander Kluge's DCTP development company for TV programs sold their remaining shares of 1% each to Discovery Content Verwaltungs GmbH, so that the American Discovery Channel has now completely taken over the broadcaster DMAX. The station name DMAX is the abbreviation of the original station name Discovery MAX.

Since 8 January 2008, an English language version of DMAX has been marketed on Sky Digital and Virgin Media pay-TV packages in the UK and Ireland. DMAX +1, DMAX +1.5 (since closed) and DMAX +2 (later replaced by TLC +2 in 2013) were created promptly, which broadcast the main program with a time delay. Since February 2010, the station can no longer be received via MonA TV. In contrast to the German version of DMAX, the English-language channel is aimed at a female target group until 2013 when it became more male skewed while continuing to use the same presentation from 2010. In 2019. The UK version rebranded and became a free-to-air channel and replaced Travel Channel on Freeview. And in 2020, Discovery's UK free-to-air channels including DMAX rebranded with new promo endboards while still using the idents and break bumpers from 2019.

DMAX has been broadcasting in a new design since February 29, 2012. A DMAX 3D logo can now be seen at the beginning and end of the trailers. Since May 1, 2012, DMAX HD has been broadcast on SES Astra's basic encrypted HD+ platform, but it was not broadcast in native HD until August 1, 2012. Since January 15, 2013, DMAX HD has also been broadcasting in Unitymedia's modernized networks.

An Austrian feed of the channel, DMAX Austria, launched on October 1, 2014. Localised advertising for the feed started on October 25, 2014. Advertising sales are handled by Goldbach Media Austria. While there are not much difference between the main channel, programs specially produced for Austria are planned for the future.

== Market shares ==
Year	Market share
2006	0,5 %
2007	0,5 %
2008	0,6 %
2009	0,7 %
2010	0,7 %
2011	0,7 %
2012	0,7 %
2013	0,8 %
2014	0,9 %
2015	1,0 %
2016	1,0 %
2017	1,0 %
2018	1,0 %
2019	1,0 %
2020	1,1 %
2021	1,1 %

== Program (selection) ==
- Was geht? Experiment am Limit ('What works? Experiments at the limits') – answers questions like 'can a gun be fired underwater?'
- Die Ludolfs – 4 Brüder auf'm Schrottplatz (The Ludolfs – 4 brothers at the scrapyard) – observes Peter, Manni, Uwe and Günther eating pasta and fiddling around on broken cars
- D Tech – Presenter Daniel Hartwich takes viewers on an entertaining journey through the world of knowledge.
- Fish 'n' Fun –beautiful landscape shots, fishing tricks and shows men how to make delicious dishes using the fish they catch. The male desire for adventure is also satisfied, for example with the documentary series on crab fishers in Alaskan waters
- D Motor – presented by Tim Schrick and Sabine Schmitz, who has to prove her own driving skill against an opponent on her local race track, the Nürburgring
- Moneycoach – Rette dein Geld (Money coach – save your money) – presenter Michael Requardt helps viewers with debt problems

The channel also features many Discovery Communications programs, including:

- Jack Osbourne: Adrenaline Junkie – a British reality series focusing on Jack Osbourne's globe-trekking six-month quest to get in physical and mental shape to climb the rockface of California's El Capitan mountain
- Knight Rider (1982 TV series) – an American television series created and produced by Glen A. Larson. The series was originally broadcast on NBC from 1982 to 1986. The show stars David Hasselhoff as Michael Knight, a high-tech modern crime fighter assisted by KITT, an advanced artificially intelligent and nearly indestructible car. This was the last series Larson devised at Universal Television before he moved to 20th Century Fox.
- Long Way Round – documentary television series of the 19,000-mile journey of Ewan McGregor and Charley Boorman from London to New York on motorcycles. They travelled eastwards through Europe and Asia, flew to Alaska and continued by road from there to New York.
- Magnum, P.I. – drama series starring Tom Selleck as Thomas Magnum, a successful private investigator. Episodes broadcast are edited.

and

- 30 Days – with Morgan Spurlock
- An Idiot Abroad – with Karl Pilkington, Ricky Gervais, Stephen Merchant and Warwick Davis
- American Chopper – with Paul Teutul Jr. and Paul Teutul Sr.
- Auction Hunters (Auction Hunters – Zwei Asse machen Kasse) (2012–present)
- Auction Kings (2013–present)
- Austin Stevens: Snakemaster (Austin Stevens – Der Gefahrensucher) (2006)
- Battleground: Rhino Wars (Rhino Wars – Kampf den Wilderern) (2013-2014, 2016)
- Better Late Than Never (Besser spät als nie) (2017–present)
- Car Matchmaker (Der Autovermittler) (2017–present)
- Cops (2017–present)
- Fast N' Loud (2012–present)
- GQ TV – based on the same format as the popular men's magazine
- How It's Made
- Teleshopping broadcasts when DMAX is off air.
- Jail (Texas Jail – Unter Arrest) (2017–present)
- Lone Star Law (Lone Star Law – Die Gesetzeshüter von Texas) (2016–present)
- Louis Theroux
- Man vs. Wild (Born Survivor: Bear Grylls) (Abenteuer Survival) (2009–present)
- Miami Ink
- Monster Garage – with Jesse James
- Mountain Monsters (?–present)
- Misfit Garage (2014-2015, 2017–present)
- Queen of the South (2017–present)
- Rick and Morty (2016–present)
- Storage Hunters (UK) (2017–present)
- Street Outlaws (2013–present)
- Texas Car Wars (2012–present)
- The Last Alaskans (Nordalaska – Überleben am Polarkreis) (2017–present)
- Vegas Rat Rods (Las Vegas Hot Rods) (2014–present)
- Wild Frank (2015–present)
- Yukon Men (Yukon Men – Überleben in Alaska) (2015–present)
