= Discovery Geschichte =

- Country: Germany
- Broadcast area: Germany, Austria

Programming
- Language: German
- Picture format: 576i (4:3 SDTV)

Ownership
- Owner: Discovery Networks Europe
- Sister channels: Discovery Channel; Animal Planet

History
- Launched: 31 March 2005; 21 years ago
- Closed: 16 May 2009; 17 years ago

Discovery Geschichte was a German television channel focusing on history-related programmes owned by Discovery Networks Europe. The channel launched on 31 March 2005, on the Premiere platform.

== Overview ==
The service was discontinued as a full 24-hour channel on 16 May 2009, after Premiere had signed a new contract with Discovery Networks Deutschland in preparation for Premiere's relaunch as Sky Deutschland in July. On Premiere, Discovery Geschichte was replaced by National Geographic Channel Germany the following day. Discovery Geschichte continues as a programming block on DMAX.
