= Top Gear series 5 =

Top Gear
- Series 5
- Starring: Jeremy Clarkson; Richard Hammond; James May; The Stig
- No. of episodes: 9

Release
- Original network: BBC Two
- Original release: 24 October – 26 December 2004

Series chronology
- ← Previous; Series 4 Next → Series 6

Series 5 of Top Gear, a British motoring magazine and factual television programme, was broadcast in the United Kingdom on BBC Two during 2004, consisting of nine episodes between 24 October and 26 December; a compilation episode, titled "Best of Top Gear", was aired on 2 January 2005, and charted the best moments from Series 4 and 5.

== Episodes ==
No. overall	No. in series	Reviews	Features/challenges	Guest(s)	Original release date	UK viewers (millions)
40	1	Porsche 911 Carrera S	Can an ice cream van jump a bouncy castle? Best Muscle Car on sale (Chrysler 300C • Vauxhall Monaro VX-R • Jaguar S-Type R)	Bill Bailey	24 October 2004	3.35
The trio return to Pendine Sands to see which is more fun to drive - the Vauxhall Monaro VXR; the Chrysler 300C; and the Jaguar S-Type R. Meanwhile, Clarkson reviews the Porsche 911 Carrera S and spot similarities with the old school version, while an ice cream van attempts to jump over four bouncy castles. Finally, comedian Bill Bailey heads out on the test track in the Liana.
41	2	Hatchbacks: (Ford Focus • Vauxhall Astra • Volkswagen Golf) • Enzo Ferrari • Supercars: (Jaguar XJ220 • Pagani Zonda • Ferrari F40 • McLaren F1 • Porsche Carrera GT)	Mountainboarder versus a rally car	Geri Halliwell	31 October 2004	3.81
Clarkson sees how three classic supercars—the Jaguar XJ220, the McLaren F1, and the Ferrari F40—compare against three modern rivals - the Pagani Zonda, the Porsche Carrera GT, and the Enzo Ferrari. Meanwhile, Hammond reviews the Ford Focus, while a world champion all-terrain skateboarder is pitted against a Group N Mitsubishi rally car and a Bowler Wildcat. Finally, Geri Halliwell finds herself as the latest star in the Liana.
42	3	Dodge Viper SRT-10	Drive a Land Rover Discovery to the top of Cnoc an Fhreiceadain in Scotland • Find the craziest car in the world • Top Gear survey 2004 results	Joanna Lumley	7 November 2004	4.41
Clarkson attempts a serious challenge for the Land Rover Discovery by seeing if it can make a tough climb up a mountain in Scotland. Meanwhile, there is a review of the Dodge Viper SRT10, Hammond searches for mad car designs with a specialist company in Switzerland, and the Top Gear 2004 survey results are in. Finally, Joanna Lumley is the latest star to do a lap in the Liana.
43	4	Pagani Zonda S Roadster • Aston Martin Vanquish S • Ferrari 575M Maranello GTC	24 hours in a Smart Forfour • Playing conkers with caravans.	Jimmy Carr • Steve Coogan	14 November 2004	4.44
Hammond and May put the Smart Forfour through a unique challenge, by spending 24 hours living within it without leaving the car. Elsewhere, Clarkson is joined by Steve Coogan for a review of the Aston Martin Vanquish S and the Ferrari 575M GTC, the Pagani Zonda S Roadster is road-tested in France, and Top Gear plays conkers with caravans. Finally, Jimmy Carr proves how lucky the worst driver in the Liana can be.
44	5	Morgan Aero 8 GTN • Mercedes-Benz 300SL	People carrier racing • Break 10:00 around the Nürburgring Nordschleife in a diesel car	Christian Slater • Sabine Schmitz	21 November 2004	4.69
Clarkson undertakes a daunting task of seeing if he can get a diesel Jaguar S-Type around the Nürburgring in under ten minutes, with the tutelage of the circuit's expert Sabine Schmitz. Meanwhile, the Morgan Aero 8 GTN is tested out on the Test Track, and Hammond decides to start a new race series for people carriers. Finally, actor Christian Slater talks about police chases and Hybrid cars before taking the Liana for a lap.
45	6	Volkswagen Golf V GTI	How much Porsche can you get for £1,500? (Porsche 928 S • Porsche 944 • Porsche 924) • Blind man doing a power lap	Cliff Richard • Billy Baxter	5 December 2004	4.87
The presenters each buy a Porsche for £1500—a van-engined 924; a 2.5-litre 4-cylinder 944; and a 928 S—where they put them through a series of tasks to determine who got the best deal, including selling the cars after being used. Meanwhile, Clarkson reviews the Volkswagen Golf V GTI, while the Liana sports two drivers doing a lap—singer Cliff Richard, and blind land speed record holder Billy Baxter.
46	7	Toyota Prius • Ford Mustang • Mitsubishi Lancer Evolution VIII MR FQ400	A four-door Evo goes head-to-head with a Lamborghini. Top Gear Awards 2004	Roger Daltrey • James Kaye	12 December 2004	3.39
Clarkson reviews the Mitsubishi Lancer Evolution VIII MR FQ400, pitting it against a Lamborghini Murciélago driving by a British touring race driver. Meanwhile, Hammond goes on a road trip with the Ford Mustang, there's a comparison contest between the Porsche Boxster and the Mercedes-Benz SLK 350, and the presenters announce Top Gears awards for 2004. Finally, The Who's lead singer, Roger Daltrey, tries to drive fast in the Liana.
47	8	Ferrari 612 Scaglietti	Epic race: Ferrari 612 Scaglietti vs Jet Plane to Verbier • Showroom cars vs old race cars • Mitsubishi Evo vs bobsleigh • The Stig attempts a sub-1:00 power lap of the test track in a Renault F1 car	Eddie Izzard	19 December 2004	5.06
Clarkson races to reach a hotel in Verbier in a Ferrari 612 Scaglietti, before Hammond and May can do so with an airline flight and Swiss trains. Meanwhile, classic racers go up against showroom cars, and there's a race between a professional bobsleigh team and a Mitsubishi Lancer Evolution. Finally, Renault's Formula 1 car attempts to get round the Test Track in under a minute, while comedian Eddie Izzard is the latest star in the Liana. Note: The car vs bobsleigh race was subsequently re-shown as part of the Top Gear Winter Olympics special shown in 2006.
48	9	Ariel Atom • BMW 1 Series • Mercedes-Benz G55 AMG	Find a 'pearl' among a collection of cars from the Pacific Rim	Trinny Woodall • Susannah Constantine	26 December 2004	3.30
Clarkson and Hammond take on reviews of the Ariel Atom and Mercedes-Benz G55 AMG respectively, while seeing which is the best hot hatchback of the 21st century—the Ford Fiesta ST150 or the Citroen C2 VTS. Elsewhere, May tests out the BMW 1-series, while there's a comparison of cars from Malaysia and South Korea. Finally, Trinny and Susannah find out who is the fastest in the Liana.

=== Best-of episodes ===
Total	No.	Title	Feature	Original air date
S4	CE	The Best of Top Gear: 2004 #2	Best Moments from Series 4–5	2 January 2005
A look back at the best moments from Series 4 and 5, including Sir Ranulph Fiennes and Joanna Lumley's laps, Hammond and May's minicab challenge, and the presenters' visit to the Pendine Sands with the Vauxhall Monaro, Chrysler 300C, and Jaguar S-Type R.
