= Eurosport 2 Xtra =

Eurosport 2 Xtra may refer to:

- Eurosport 2 Xtra (Germany)
- Eurosport 2 Xtra (Portugal)
