= Carpenters Corner =

Carpenters Corner may refer to:

- Carpenters Corner, Delaware, U.S.
- An unincorporated community in Pennington County, Minnesota, U.S.
- A section of the Top Gear test track, Surrey, U.K.
