= Discovery Channel (German TV channel) =

Television channel

Discovery Channel Germany
- Country: Germany
- Broadcast area: Germany, Austria, Switzerland, Luxembourg
- Headquarters: Munich, Germany

Programming
- Language: German

Ownership
- Owner: Warner Bros. Discovery EMEA
- Sister channels: Animal Planet; DMAX; Eurosport 1 Eurosport 2 Eurosport 2 Xtra; TLC

History
- Launched: 27 August 1996; 29 years ago

Links
- Website: http://discoverychannel.de/

Discovery Channel Germany is the German version of the Discovery Channel It is operated by Warner Bros. Discovery Deutschland, which is located in Munich.

It was launched on 27 August 1996 on the DF1 satellite platform. Back then, the channel was a joint-venture between Kirch Media and Discovery Communications. After DF1 merged with Premiere World in 1999, it remained on the new Premiere platform.

Kirch Media went bankrupt in 2002 and Discovery Communications subsequently became the sole owner of the channel.

The channel was later joined by sister channel with the launch on Animal Planet in 2004, Discovery Geschichte in 2005 and Discovery HD in 2006.

Discovery Channel was exclusively available through Premiere until 2009, when a new agreement was entered between Premiere and Discovery. The new contract allows the Discovery Channel to broadcast from other providers from 1 July and means that Animal Planet and Discovery Geschichte would disappear from premiere to US version.

== Audience share ==
=== Germany ===
	January	February	March	April	May	June	July	August	September	October	November	December	Annual average
2017	0.1%	0.1%	0.1%	0.1%	0.1%	0.1%	0.1%	0.1%	0.1%	0.1%	0.0%	0.0%	0.1%
2018													
