= DMAX (TV channel) =

Men's lifestyle television channel

- Product type: Television networks
- Current owner: Skydance International Content and Distribution
- Country: United States
- Introduced: 1 September 2006
- Markets: Asia-Pacific (Pay Television); Germany (Free-to-air); Italy (Free-to-air); Middle East & North Africa (Pay Television); Spain (Free-to-air); Turkey (Free-to-air); United Kingdom & Ireland (Free-to-air)

DMAX
- Country: Germany
- Broadcast area: Germany, Austria and Switzerland
- Headquarters: Munich, Germany

Programming
- Picture format: 1080i HDTV (downscaled to 576i for the SD feed)

Ownership
- Owner: Skydance Corporation
- Sister channels: Animal Planet; Discovery Channel; Eurosport 1 Eurosport 2 Eurosport 2 Xtra; TLC

History
- Launched: 1 September 2006; 20 years ago
- Replaced: XXP (2001–2006)

Links
- Website: dmax.de

Availability

Terrestrial
- DVB-T2 (Germany): Various; region dependent (HD / encrypted)

DMAX is a men's lifestyle channel operated by Warner Bros. Discovery EMEA, a division of Skydance International Content and Distribution owned by Skydance Corporation.

It broadcasts free-to-air in Germany, Austria, Switzerland, United Kingdom, Ireland, Italy and Spain; Turkey has their own version of the channel too. It is also widely available throughout the rest of Europe. It is seen as the only free-to-air mainstream channel with a focus on non-fiction entertainment, unique in German media.

DMAX broadcasts from the Astra 1H, 1L, and 3A satellites and is uplinked by SES Platform Services (later MX1, now part of SES Video).

== History ==
=== Background ===
DMAX is the Discovery Communications creation from the originally German sourced and owned station XXP. Discovery purchased XXP on 1 January 2006. DMAX was launched as a free-to-air channel from 1 September, targeted at men.

Its name was invented by Discovery Creative Director James Gilbey who asked design agencies to submit names in an innovative competition. RedBee based in London were the winning agency.

Its most recent rebrand was created by Artillery Design Ltd based in Brighton UK.

DMAX focuses on men's hobbies, and its range of programmes is aimed at men looking for more than the current offer of sports and news programmes. DMAX involves a mix of adventure and discovery, cars and technology, popular science, DIY and travel. DMAX does not include football or erotic programmes.

Patrick Hörl is managing director, while Katja Hofem-Best, who comes from RTL II, is CEO.

=== DMAX ===
DMAX is the successor to the television station XXP, which was taken over by the US media group Discovery Inc. in January 2006 at 98%. The remaining two percent remained with the former main shareholders dctp and Spiegel TV. On September 1, 2006, XXP was merged into the new channel DMAX. In 2007, Spiegel TV GmbH and Alexander Kluge's DCTP development company for TV programs sold their remaining shares of 1% each to Discovery Content Verwaltungs GmbH, so that the American Discovery Channel has now completely taken over the broadcaster DMAX. The station name DMAX is the abbreviation of the original station name Discovery MAX.

Since 8 January 2008, an English language version of DMAX has been marketed on Sky Digital and Virgin Media pay-TV packages in the UK and Ireland. DMAX +1, DMAX +1.5 (since closed) and DMAX +2 (later replaced by TLC +2 in 2013) were created promptly, which broadcast the main program with a time delay. Since February 2010, the station can no longer be received via MonA TV. In contrast to the German version of DMAX, the English-language channel is aimed at a female target group until 2013 when it became more male skewed while continuing to use the same presentation from 2010. In 2019. The UK version rebranded and became a free-to-air channel and replaced Travel Channel on Freeview. And in 2020, Discovery's UK free-to-air channels including DMAX rebranded with new promo endboards while still using the idents and break bumpers from 2019.

DMAX has been broadcasting in a new design since February 29, 2012. A DMAX 3D logo can now be seen at the beginning and end of the trailers. Since May 1, 2012, DMAX HD has been broadcast on SES Astra's basic encrypted HD+ platform, but it was not broadcast in native HD until August 1, 2012. Since January 15, 2013, DMAX HD has also been broadcasting in Unitymedia's modernized networks.

Since October 1, 2014, the station has had its own Austrian offshoot called DMAX Austria. A separate advertising window for Austria has been broadcast on this channel since October 25, 2014. Goldbach Media Austria acts as advertising marketer. Otherwise, the program does not differ from the German program, and programs specially produced for Austria are planned for the future.

== Additional DMAX channels ==
In Spain, it was launched on 12 January 2012 as Discovery MAX, a specialty channel fully owned by Unidad Editorial and it renamed in September 2016 when Warner Bros. Discovery acquired the full ownership. With the success of the German speaking DMAX a separate channel was launched for the UK and Ireland markets on 22 November 2007. DMAX was launched in Italy on 12 December 2011, and now is the ninth most watched channel of the country. In the Asia-Pacific market, DMAX launched on 7 July 2014 replacing Discovery Turbo (Asia). In the Turkey market, DMAX launched on 18 March 2018 replacing NTV Spor after Doğuş Media Group's NTV Spor channel was acquired by Discovery, since February.

== Some programmes shown on DMAX ==
- Was geht? Experiment am Limit ('What works? Experiments at the limits') – answers questions like 'can a gun be fired underwater?'
- Die Ludolfs – 4 Brüder auf'm Schrottplatz (The Ludolfs – 4 brothers at the scrapyard) – observes Peter, Manni, Uwe and Günther eating pasta and fiddling around on broken cars
- D Tech – Presenter Daniel Hartwich takes viewers on an entertaining journey through the world of knowledge.
- Fish 'n' Fun –beautiful landscape shots, fishing tricks and shows men how to make delicious dishes using the fish they catch. The male desire for adventure is also satisfied, for example with the documentary series on crab fishers in Alaskan waters
- D Motor – presented by Tim Schrick and Sabine Schmitz, who has to prove her own driving skill against an opponent on her local race track, the Nürburgring
- Moneycoach – Rette dein Geld (Money coach – save your money) – presenter Michael Requardt helps viewers with debt problems

The channel also features many Discovery Communications programs, including:

- Jack Osbourne: Adrenaline Junkie – a British reality series focusing on Jack Osbourne's globe-trekking six-month quest to get in physical and mental shape to climb the rockface of California's El Capitan mountain
- Knight Rider (1982 TV series) – an American television series created and produced by Glen A. Larson. The series was originally broadcast on NBC from 1982 to 1986. The show stars David Hasselhoff as Michael Knight, a high-tech modern crime fighter assisted by KITT, an advanced artificially intelligent and nearly indestructible car. This was the last series Larson devised at Universal Television before he moved to 20th Century Fox.
- Long Way Round – documentary television series of the 19,000-mile journey of Ewan McGregor and Charley Boorman from London to New York on motorcycles. They travelled eastwards through Europe and Asia, flew to Alaska and continued by road from there to New York.
- Magnum, P.I. – drama series starring Tom Selleck as Thomas Magnum, a successful private investigator. Episodes broadcast are edited.

and

- 30 Days – with Morgan Spurlock
- An Idiot Abroad – with Karl Pilkington, Ricky Gervais, Stephen Merchant and Warwick Davis
- American Chopper – with Paul Teutul Jr. and Paul Teutul Sr.
- Auction Hunters (Auction Hunters – Zwei Asse machen Kasse) (2012–present)
- Auction Kings (2013–present)
- Austin Stevens: Snakemaster (Austin Stevens – Der Gefahrensucher) (2006)
- Battleground: Rhino Wars (Rhino Wars – Kampf den Wilderern) (2013-2014, 2016)
- Better Late Than Never (Besser spät als nie) (2017–present)
- Car Matchmaker (Der Autovermittler) (2017–present)
- Cops (2017–present)
- Fast N' Loud (2012–present)
- GQ TV – based on the same format as the popular men's magazine
- How It's Made
- Teleshopping broadcasts when DMAX is off air.
- Jail (Texas Jail – Unter Arrest) (2017–present)
- Lone Star Law (Lone Star Law – Die Gesetzeshüter von Texas) (2016–present)
- Louis Theroux
- Man vs. Wild (Born Survivor: Bear Grylls) (Abenteuer Survival) (2009–present)
- Miami Ink
- Monster Garage – with Jesse James
- Mountain Monsters (?–present)
- Misfit Garage (2014-2015, 2017–present)
- Queen of the South (2017–present)
- Rick and Morty (2016–present)
- Storage Hunters (UK) (2017–present)
- Street Outlaws (2013–present)
- Texas Car Wars (2012–present)
- The Last Alaskans (Nordalaska – Überleben am Polarkreis) (2017–present)
- Vegas Rat Rods (Las Vegas Hot Rods) (2014–present)
- Wild Frank (2015–present)
- Yukon Men (Yukon Men – Überleben in Alaska) (2015–present)

== Audience share ==
=== Germany ===
	January	February	March	April	May	June	July	August	September	October	November	December	Annual average
2006	-	-	-	-	-	-	-	-	0.4%	0.4%	0.4%	0.5%	0.4%
2007	0.4%	0.5%	0.4%	0.5%	0.5%	0.5%	0.5%	0.6%	0.5%	0.5%	0.5%	0.6%	▲0.5%
2008	0.5%	0.5%	0.6%	0.6%	0.6%	0.6%	0.7%	0.6%	0.5%	0.5%	0.6%	0.6%	▲0.6%
2009	0.6%	0.7%	0.7%	0.6%	0.7%	0.7%	0.6%	0.6%	0.6%	0.6%	0.7%	0.7%	▲0.7%
2010	0.6%	0.6%	0.6%	0.7%	0.7%	0.6%	0.7%	0.7%	0.7%	0.7%	0.7%	0.6%	0.7%
2011	0.6%	0.8%	0.7%	0.8%	0.8%	0.9%	0.8%	0.7%	0.8%	0.7%	0.7%	0.7%	0.7%
2012	0.6%	0.7%	0.7%	0.7%	0.8%	0.6%	0.8%	0.7%	0.8%	0.8%	0.7%	0.9%	0.7%
2013	0.8%	0.8%	0.9%	0.9%	0.9%	1.0%	1.0%	1.0%	1.0%	1.0%	0.9%	1.0%	▲0.9%
2014	1.0%	0.9%	0.9%	1.1%	1.0%	1.0%	1.0%	1.0%	1.0%	1.0%	0.9%	1.0%	▲1.0%
2015	1.0%	1.0%	0.9%	1.0%	0.9%	0.9%	0.9%	1.1%	1.0%	1.1%	1.0%	1.0%	1.0%
2016	1.0%	1.2%	1.2%	1.1%	1.1%	0.9%	1.0%	1.0%	1.0%	0.9%	1.0%	1.1%	1.0%
2017	0.9%	1.0%	0.9%	1.0%	1.0%	1.0%	0.8%	1.0%	1.0%	1.0%	1.0%	0.9%	1.0%
2018	1.0%	1.0%	1.1%	1.1%									

== Asia-Pacific ==
DMAX
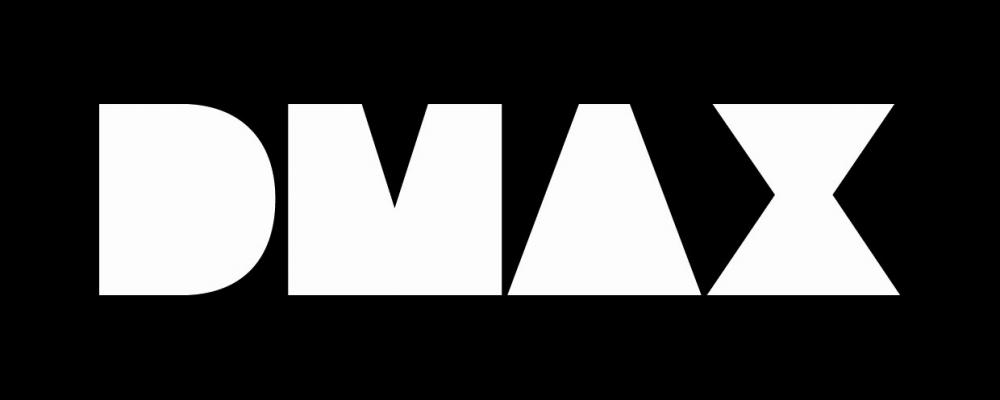
- Country: Singapore
- Broadcast area: Southeast Asia; Australia
- Headquarters: Singapore

Programming
- Languages: English; Vietnamese (Vietnam)
- Picture format: 1080i HDTV (downscaled to 16:9 480i/576i for the SDTV feed)

Ownership
- Owner: Warner Bros. Discovery Asia-Pacific
- Sister channels: Discovery Channel; Animal Planet; TLC; Discovery Science; Eve; Discovery Asia

History
- Launched: 7 July 2014; 12 years ago
- Replaced: Discovery Turbo (2008-2014, SD feed; 2013-2015, HD feed)
- Closed: 1 June 2025; 17 months ago (Malaysia, Astro Feed)

DMAX is a Southeast Asian pay television channel (excluding Malaysia) centred on broadcasting documentaries, factual-entertainment, lifestyle and reality programming TV series for male audiences.

It is owned by Discovery Asia-Pacific, a division of Warner Bros. Discovery In South Asia, the channel is available under the Discovery Turbo name carrying the same content and schedule.

The channel was launched in 2003 as Discovery Home & Leisure, Discovery Real Time in 2005 and rebranded as Discovery Turbo in 2008. It was rebranded on 7 July 2014 as DMAX with the airing of American Digger at 6:00 AM (UTC+8). Some of its shows are also broadcast on Discovery Channel in Motor Mania every Thursday nights.

== EMEA ==
=== Italy ===
DMAX
- Country: Italy
- Broadcast area: Italy; San Marino; Vatican City; Switzerland

Programming
- Languages: Italian; English
- Picture format: 1080i HDTV

Ownership
- Owner: Skydance Corporation
- Sister channels: Nove; Discovery; Discovery Turbo; Food Network; Frisbee; Giallo; HGTV; K2; Real Time

History
- Launched: 10 November 2011; 15 years ago

Links
- Website: dmax.it

Availability

Terrestrial
- Digital terrestrial television: Channel 52 (HD)

Streaming media
- Discovery+: DMAX HD

The Italian version of the channel began its broadcasting at 6:45 pm on 10 November 2011 with the show Destroyed in Seconds. DMAX is available on channel 52 of digital television, on Sky Italia at channel 136 in HD and on Tivù Sat at channel 28 in HD. It is the first factual-entertainment channel for a male audience in Italy.

From 17 December 2012, it broadcasts on Tivùsat at LCN 28 and moves to LCN 808 of Sky Italia. From 9 April 2014 it moved to LCN 136 of Sky Italia, with the official launch of the +1 version at LCN 137. From 7 November of the same year DMAX also broadcasts in HD on the Sky Italia platform.

From 1 March 2019 DMAX HD and DMAX +1 become visible also on Tivùsat at LCN 28 and 128, replacing the SD version. On 13 March 2019 definitively closes the SD version on the satellite, also disappearing from Sky Italia. From 9 April DMAX, together with the other free channels of the group, is also available in high definition streaming on Dplay.

On 1 December 2020, DMAX +1 was shut down. It will cover all Six Nations matches until 2021.

On 26 March 2024, WWE's official commentators for the network, Michele Posa and Luca Franchini announce that for the first time in 30 years Wrestlemania will be available on a free-to-pay channel in Italy in prime time on Saturday 13 and Sunday 14.

=== Middle East and North Africa ===
DMAX
- Country: United Arab Emirates
- Broadcast area: MENA

Programming
- Languages: English; Arabic
- Picture format: 1080i (HDTV)

History
- Launched: 1 August 2006; 20 years ago
- Replaced: Discovery Channel
- Closed: 1 January 2021; 5 years ago
- Former names: MTV Discovery (2006-07); Discovery (2007-15); Discovery Movie Animation Xtra (2015-16)

A former TV channel in the Middle East and North Africa. beIN Media Group and Discovery, Inc. announced in February 2016, that they would launch a version of DMAX in the MENA market. The channel was launched on 1 August 2016 and broadcast on beIN Network.

=== Spain ===
DMAX
- Country: Spain
- Broadcast area: Spain, Andorra, Gibraltar
- Headquarters: Madrid

Programming
- Language: Spanish
- Picture format: 1080i HDTV

Ownership
- Owner: Unidad Editorial (2011-2016); Warner Bros. Discovery EMEA (2016-2026); Skydance Corporation (2026-present)

History
- Launched: 12 January 2012; 13 years ago as Discovery MAX; 12 September 2016; 8 years ago as DMAX
- Closed: 11 September 2016; 8 years ago as Discovery MAX

Links
- Website: dmax.marca.com

Availability

Terrestrial
- Digital terrestrial television: Check local frequencies

Former logo used until 2016

The Spanish version is a free-to-air television channel. At the end of 2011, the launch of DMAX, a specialty irritation television channel on documentaries and factuals fully owned by Unidad Editorial, was announced. The new channel replaced Veo TV on digital terrestrial television. DMAX began broadcasting on January 12, 2012.

DMAX underwent its first transformation on September 12, 2016, when the channel added series and movies to its programming, and it required ownership and rights by Discovery, Inc. and rebranding it from Discovery MAX to DMAX. As of the same date, DMAX began to target the male audience due to the launch of DKISS, a channel owned by Grupo Radio Blanca but fed with Discovery programming, however, DKISS is aimed at a female audience.

In 2017, the channel began broadcasting sports after obtaining the rights to broadcast the Australian Open, later expanding its offer with the rights to broadcast the Roland–Garros Open.

In 2018 the channel obtained the rights to broadcast the Winter Olympics in conjunction with Eurosport, a situation that was repeated for the 2022 edition, In this way, DMAX took the place of broadcasting this sporting event in Spain, which had historically been broadcast by TVE.

=== United Kingdom and Ireland ===
DMAX launched in the UK and Ireland on January 8 2008, going free on January 16 2019.

== Programmes ==
- Airplane Repo
- Alaska: The Last Frontier
- American Chopper
- American Digger
- American Loggers
- American Muscle
- America's Worst Tattoos
- Around The World in 80 Ways
- Artifact or Fiction
- Backyard Oil
- #BikerLive
- Bounty Wars
- Car Chasers
- Car Crazy Central
- Car That Rocks with Brian Johnson
- Chasing Classic Cars
- Chop Shop: London Garage
- Chrome Underground
- Dallas Cars Sharks
- Desert Car Kings
- The Devils Ride
- Dukes of Haggle
- Extreme Car Hoarders
- FantomWorks
- Fat N' Furious: Rolling Thunder
- Fast N' Loud
- Fifth Gear
- The Fighters
- Flying Wild Alaska
- The Garage
- High Tech Rednecks
- Inside West Coast Customs
- Last Car Standing
- Mighty Planes
- Mighty Ships
- Machine Morphers
- The Motorbike Show
- Out of Control Drivers
- Outrageous 911
- Overhaulin'
- Porter Ridge
- Property Wars
- Railroad Alaska
- Restoration Garage
- Rods N' Wheels
- Smokin' Sundays
- Swamp Loggers
- The Super Hero Squad Show (After Machine Morphers)
- Trick My What?
- Twist the Throttle
- Unique Whips Special Edition
- Warlock Rising
- What's in the Barn?
- Wheeler Dealers
- Wrecked
