= DKiss =

Spanish television network

DKISS
- Country: Spain
- Broadcast area: Spain
- Headquarters: Madrid

Programming
- Language: Spanish
- Picture format: 1080i HDTV

Ownership
- Owner: Grupo KISS Media
- Sister channels: Hit TV; DMAX

History
- Launched: 28 April 2016
- Former names: 9Kiss TV (prelaunch)

Links
- Website: https://www.dkiss.es/

Availability

Terrestrial
- DVB-T: Check local frequencies

DKISS is a Spanish free-to-air television channel, belongs to Grupo KISS Media.

== History ==
In October 2015, Radio Blanca (now Grupo KISS Media) was announced as one of the winning companies of a digital terrestrial television license. In November 2015, Radio Blanca announced that it would use its license to create a channel aimed at an audience between 20 and 40 years old, which would have general programming without news programs.

In December 2015, Radio Blanca announced that the channel would be called 9Kiss TV, would begin broadcasting in April 2016, and its programming would be aimed at a young female audience. Following the announcement of this identity, Radio Blanca's local television channels went on to adopt the Hit TV name, leaving Kiss TV for the national channel.

In Spring 2016, Radio Blanca and Discovery, Inc. signed an agreement whereby Discovery became the main programming provider for the new channel, adopting the name DKiss instead of 9Kiss TV. After this, DKiss became the sister channel of DMAX.

On April 28, DKiss began broadcasting.

== Programming ==
DKiss's programming is based on entertainment. Especially reality shows and docudramas are broadcast. Most of the programming comes from Discovery productions, DKiss focuses on health and lifestyle. Among the most outstanding programs of the channel are: My 600-lb Life, RuPaul's Drag Race, Salvage Hunters, Cake Boss or Property Brothers.
