= Top Gear series 6 =

Top Gear
- Series 6
- Starring: Jeremy Clarkson; Richard Hammond; James May; The Stig
- No. of episodes: 11

Release
- Original network: BBC Two
- Original release: 22 May – 7 August 2005

Series chronology
- ← Previous; Series 5 Next → Series 7

Series 6 of Top Gear, a British motoring magazine and factual television programme, was broadcast in the United Kingdom on BBC Two during 2005, consisting of eleven episodes between 22 May and 7 August. This featured a survey regarding the "Greatest Driving Song of All Time" during the latter half of the series, with other highlights including a recreation the programme's theme tune with different car engines, and the presenters having their mothers evaluate three different cars.

== Episodes ==
No. overall	No. in series	Reviews	Features/challenges	Guest(s)	Original release date	UK viewers (millions)
49	1	Mercedes-Benz CLS55 AMG • Honda Element • Toyota Aygo • Range Rover Sport	Toyota Aygo Football • Range Rover Sport vs Challenger 2 Tank	James Nesbitt	22 May 2005	4.51
Clarkson puts the Range Rover Sport through its paces, including a test to see if it can avoid being locked on by the main cannon of a Challenger 2 tank. Meanwhile, the Mercedes-Benz CLS55 AMG and Honda Element are reviewed, and Hammond and May compete against each other in a game of "car football" with a group of Toyota Aygos. Finally, James Nesbitt sees what time he can make in the reasonably priced car.
50	2	Maserati MC12	Two-door coupé for less than £1,500 that isn't a Porsche (Mitsubishi Starion • BMW 635CSi • Jaguar XJ-S)	Jack Dee	29 May 2005	3.67
Following the Porsche cheap car challenge, the presenters each buy a two-door coupé for less than £1,500 that isn't a Porsche—a Jaguar XJ-S, a BMW 635CSi, and a Mitsubishi Starion—and then put then through a series of tests, including a race on a grass circuit. Elsewhere, Clarkson reviews the speedy Maserati MC12, and comedian Jack Dee attempts to be fast in the Liana.
51	3	Aston Martin DB9 Volante • Maserati Bora • Wiesmann MF 3 • TVR Tuscan	Clarkson opens a public pool with a Rolls-Royce	Christopher Eccleston	12 June 2005	3.96
Clarkson decides to fix up a classic Rolls-Royce, in time for his guest appearance at the opening of a new lido. Meanwhile, May drives a 1970s Maserati Bora, the Wiesmann MF3 and the TVR Tuscan are tested out on the Test Track, Top Gear gets a look at the Batmobile from Batman Begins, and Hammond gives his opinion on the Aston Martin DB9 Volante. Finally, actor Christopher Eccleston trades his TARDIS for a go in the Liana.
52	4	Cadillac CTS-V • BMW 320d	Presenters' mums help evaluate cars: (Peugeot 1007 • Renault Modus • Honda Jazz) • Can a stretch limo jump over the wedding party?	Omid Djalili	19 June 2005	3.45
The presenters decide to have their mothers test out and give their opinion on three new hatchbacks—the Renault Modus, the Honda Jazz and the Peugeot 1007. Meanwhile, Clarkson reviews the Cadillac CTS-V, Hammond tests out the new BMW 3 Series on the M4 corridor, and a limo attempts to jump over a "wedding party". Finally, British-Iranian comedian Omid Djalili sees if he can get round fast in the Liana.
53	5	Aston Martin DB5 • Jaguar E-Type • Nissan Murano • Maserati GranSport • Porsche Boxster S • Mercedes-Benz SLK 55 AMG	Soldiers shoot at Clarkson while he drives the Boxster S and the SLK 55 AMG to see which one is best avoiding bullets • Hammond sees if he can beat a time set by Maserati's Chief Test Driver in the GranSport	Damon Hill	26 June 2005	3.66
Clarkson sees if the Mercedes-Benz SLK55 AMG and Porsche Boxster S can avoid being shot at by snipers from the Irish Guards. Elsewhere, the Aston Martin DB5 and a modernised Jaguar E-type are reviewed, Hammond attempts a time trial with a Maserati Coupé, May reviews a Nissan Murano, and Top Gear launches a hunt for "Greatest Driving Song of All Time". Finally, F1 driver Damon Hill takes the Liana around the test track.
54	6	Mercedes-Benz SLR McLaren	Epic race to Oslo: Mercedes-Benz SLR McLaren vs. a boat • Aston Martin DBR9 lap time	David Dimbleby	3 July 2005	4.55
The car is up against a boat, as Clarkson engages another race by seeking to reach Oslo from the UK with a Mercedes-Benz SLR McLaren through seven countries, while Hammond and May attempt to beat him via a long-distance ferry and a speedboat. Meanwhile, the Aston Martin DBR9 receives a review, while broadcaster David Dimbleby is asked the questions before he steps into the Liana.
55	7	TVR Sagaris • Fiat Panda 4x4	Fiat Panda against a marathon runner • Sabine Schmitz attempts to beat 9:59 around the Nürburgring in a Ford Transit	Justin Hawkins • Sabine Schmitz	10 July 2005	3.75
To celebrate the 40th birthday of the Ford Transit van, Hammond attempts to see if Sabine Schmitz can do a lap of the Nürburgring with a Transit, faster than Clarkson did in the diesel Jaguar S-Type. Meanwhile, the TVR Sagaris is reviewed, and Clarkson attempts a race between a Fiat Panda and marathon runner A.C. Muir through London. Finally, The Darkness' Justin Hawkins becomes the latest to get their hands on the Liana's wheel.
56	8	Ferrari F430	Convertible versions of existing coupes in Iceland (Audi TT • Nissan 350Z • Chrysler Crossfire)	Tim Rice	17 July 2005	4.10
The presenters head to Iceland to test out three convertible versions of existing coupes—the Chrysler Crossfire, the Nissan 350Z and the Audi TT—where all three struggle to find anything good about each. Meanwhile, Clarkson reviews the hard-top and convertible versions of the Ferrari F430, and author Tim Rice is the latest star to step into the reasonable priced car.
57	9	BMW M5 • Hot Hatches: (Vauxhall Astra VXR • Renault Mégane Sport 225 Trophy • Volkswagen Golf GTI)	"Road Test Russian Roulette" • World record attempt for number of times a car has rolled at high speed	Chris Evans	24 July 2005	5.18
Hammond and May spend an evening doing "Road Test Russian Roulette", by volunteering to drive drunk people home in their own cars. Meanwhile, Clarkson reviews the BMW M5 and three hatchbacks—the VW Golf GTI, the RenaultSport Mégane, and the Vauxhall Astra VXR—while there is an attempt set a world record for sideway rolls made by a Ford Sierra. Finally, broadcaster Chris Evans is on the track in the Liana.
58	10	BMW 535d • Bentley Continental Flying Spur	Driving over a lake in Iceland • What is the most fun off-road toy?	Davina McCall • Mark Webber	31 July 2005	4.92
The trio hire out a series of off-road toys to see which is value for money for off-roading fun. Meanwhile, Hammond returns to Iceland to see if a snowmobile ride across the surface of Lake Kleifarvatn, May travels to Dubai to drive the Bentley Continental Flying Spur, and Clarkson reviews the diesel BMW 535d four-door sedan . Finally, tv presenter Davina McCall and F1 driver Mark Webber see how fast they can be in the Liana.
59	11	Ford F150 SVT Lightning • Vauxhall Monaro VXR • Lamborghini Murciélago Roadster	Recreate Top Gear Theme Song using engine noises	Yasuyuki Kazama • Timothy Spall	7 August 2005	4.58
May attempts to recreate the Top Gear theme tune using car engine noises. Elsewhere, Hammonds goes drifting in the Vauxhall Monaro VX-R and recreates the excitement of the Pamplona Bull Run in Spain with the Lamborghini Murciélago Roadster, Clarkson tests the Ford Lightning pick-up truck, and the winner of the "Greatest Driving Song of All Time" is announced. Finally, Timothy Spall makes an attempt to set a time with the Liana.
