= TLC (German TV channel) =

- Country: Germany
- Broadcast area: Germany, Austria, Switzerland
- Headquarters: Munich, Germany

Programming
- Language: German
- Picture format: 1080i HDTV (downscaled to 576i for the SD feed)

Ownership
- Owner: Warner Bros. Discovery
- Sister channels: Animal Planet; Discovery Channel; DMAX; Eurosport 1 Eurosport 2 Eurosport 2 Xtra

History
- Launched: 10 April 2014; 12 years ago

Links
- Website: tlc.de

Availability

Streaming media
- Magine TV (Germany): -

TLC is a German Free-to-air television channel from Warner Bros. Discovery Germany. It went on air on 10 April 2014 via satellite, cable and IPTV.

The program is mainly directed at women between the ages of 20 and 49, and will focus on non-fiction entertainment programs, some of which will be taken over by TLC US and will be partly produced in-house. The main focus will be on documentaries, reports and magazines. The channel is advertised with the slogan Hier spielt das Leben.. Jana Ina Zarrella was appointed as the host of the station.

== History ==
In September 2013, Discovery Networks Germany announced that it would launch the TLC television format established in the United States in spring 2014 in Germany. In mid-December 2013, the Bayerische Landeszentrale für neue Medien (BLM) issued a license for eight years from the date of dispatch. In May 2016, the on-air design and the logo changed slightly and were enriched with emojis, which is known from the online domain.

== Programming ==
- 7 Little Johnstons (Unsere kleine Großfamilie) (2016–present)
- A Crime to Remember (The Crime Chronicles) (2015–present)
- An American Murder Mystery (American Murder Mystery) (2017–present)
- Animal Cops: Houston (Tierpolizei Houston) (2017–present)
- Baggage Battles (Baggage Battles – Die Koffer-Jäger) (2014–present)
- Bling It On (Queen of Bling Bling) (2015–present)
- Candy Queen (2015–present)
- Coach Charming (Coach Charming – Schönheit will gelernt sein) (2016–present)
- Dating Naked (2015–present)
- Dead Silent (Tödliche Stille) (2017–present)
- Deadly Affairs (Mörderische Affären) (2014–present)
- Dynamo: Magician Impossible (Dynamo: Magic Impossible) (2014–present)
- Evil, I (Das Böse in mir) (2016–present)
- Evil Encounters (Dunkle Begegnungen) (2018–present)
- Evil Kin (Tödliche Verwandtschaft) (2014–present)
- Evil Stepmothers (Böse Stiefmütter) (2017–present)
- Extreme Couponing (Couponing Extrem) (2014–present)
- Flip or Flop Atlanta (Top oder Flop? Die Super-Makler in Atlanta) (2018–present)
- Flip or Flop Las Vegas (Top oder Flop? Die Super-Makler in Las Vegas) (2018–present)
- Ghosts of Shepherdstown (Die Geister von Shepherdstown) (2017–present)
- Ghost Asylum (Ghost Asylum – Fluch der Vergangenheit) (2017–present)
- Gypsy Sisters (2015–present)
- Haunted Case Files (Paranormal Investigation – Geistern auf der Spur) (2016–present)
- Hell House (2016–present)
- Hotel Impossible (2020–present)
- Hungry Brothers (Zwei Brüder mit Geschmack) (2015–present)
- I Am Homicide (McFadden ermittelt) (2017–present)
- I (Almost) Got Away with It (Mein (fast) perfektes Verbrechen) (2015–present)
- Island Life (Island Life – Traumhaus gesucht) (2018–present)
- JonBenét: An American Murder Mystery (Der Mordfall JonBenét) (2017–present)
- Kindred Spirits (Ruhelose Seelen – Nachrichten aus der Zwischenwelt) (2017–present)
- Love Lust or Run (Style Surprise) (2015–present)
- Miami Animal Police (Tierpolizei Miami) (2017–present)
- Molto Bene (Molto Bene – Benedetta kocht) (2017–present)
- My Big Fat American Gypsy Wedding (My Big Fat Gypsy Wedding) (2014–present)
- My First Home (Unser erstes Zuhause) (2014–present)
- My Giant Life (My Giant Life – Die Welt von oben) (2016–present)
- My Naked Secret (Mein nacktes Geheimnis) (2014–present)
- Nate & Jeremiah by Design (Schöner wohnen mit Nate & Jeremiah) (2017–present)
- Over My Dead Body (Nur über meine Leiche) (2016–present)
- Paranormal Lockdown (72 Stunden im Geisterhaus) (2016–present)
- Paranormal Survivor (2016–present)
- Pit Bulls & Parolees (Pitbulls auf Bewährung) (2016–present)
- Playhouse Masters (Kids' Playhouse – Kinderträume werden wahr) (2017–present)
- Poisoned Passions (Falsche Begierde) (2014–present)
- Ridiculous Cakes (Crazy Cakes – Die Tortenkünstler) (2018–present)
- RuPaul's Drag Race (2015–2016)
- Save My Style (Die Fashion-Therapie) (2017–present)
- Say Yes to the Dress (Mein Traum in Weiß) (2014–present)
- Say Yes to the Dress: Canada (Mein Traum in Weiß: Toronto) (2016–present)
- Secret Lives of Stepford Wives (Secrets of American Housewives) (2015–present)
- Shadow of Doubt (Schatten des Zweifels) (2017–present)
- Shahs of Sunset (Die Schahs von Beverly Hills) (2015–present)
- Shock Trauma: Edge of Life (Notaufnahme Maryland: Die härtesten Fälle) (2017–present)
- Skin Tight (Raus aus meiner Haut) (2016–present)
- Snog Marry Avoid? (Abgeschminkt – Weniger ist mehr) (2014–2016)
- Suddenly Royal (Plötzlich König) (2016–present)
- Sweet 15: Quinceañera (Sweet 15 – Prinzessin für einen Tag) (2016–present)
- Swamp Murders (Tatort Sumpf) (2016–present)
- Tabloid with Jerry Springer (Enthüllt! Jerry Springer deckt auf) (2015–present)
- Tattoo Fixers (Tattoo-Sünden) (2016–present)
- Tattoos After Dark (2015–present)
- The Coroner: I Speak for the Dead (Der Coroner – Fälle der Rechtsmedizin) (2016–present)
- The Fabulous Baker Brothers (Zwei Brüder mit Geschmack) (2015–present)
- The Fabulous Baker Brothers: A Bite Of Britain (Zwei Brüder mit Geschmack) (2015–present)
- The Golden State Killer: It's Not Over (Golden State Killer – Tatort Kalifornien) (2018–present)
- The Little Couple (Kleines Paar, große Liebe) (2015–present)
- The Zoo (Bronx Zoo – Tierpark der Superlative) (2017–present)
- Too Ugly For Love? (Liebe mit Schönheitsfehler) (2017–present)
- Troy (Troy – Die perfekte Illusion) (2014–present)
- Ubådssagen – hele historien (Tatort U-Boot – der Fall Kim Wall) (2018–present)
- Who the (Bleep) Did I Marry? (Verliebt, verlobt, verhaftet) (2014–present)
- Young, Hot & Crooked (Jung, schön und skrupellos) (2015–present)

== Audience share ==
=== Germany ===
	January	February	March	April	May	June	July	August	September	October	November	December	Annual average
2014	-	-	-	-	0.1%	0.1%	0.1%	0.1%	0.1%	0.1%	0.1%	0.1%	0.1%
2015	0.1%	0.1%	0.1%	0.1%	0.1%	0.2%	0.2%	0.2%	0.2%	0.2%	0.3%	0.3%	▲0.2%
2016	0.2%	0.2%	0.3%	0.3%	0.3%	0.3%	0.3%	0.3%	0.3%	0.3%	0.3%	0.3%	▲0.3%
2017	0.3%	0.3%	0.3%	0.4%	0.4%	0.4%	0.4%	0.4%	0.3%	0.4%	0.3%	0.3%	0.3%
2018	0.3%	0.2%	0.4%	0.4%	0.4%	0.4%	0.5%						
