= Discovery Home & Leisure =

Discovery Home & Leisure has been used as a name for the following channels:

- Planet Green
- Discovery Real Time
- Discovery Turbo (Asia)
