= Sabine Schmitz =

German racing driver and television personality (1969–2021)

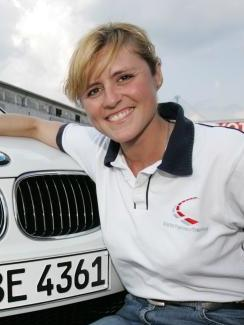
- Schmitz in 2007
- Born: 14 May 1969; Adenau, Rhineland-Palatinate, West Germany
- Died: 16 March 2021 (aged 51); Trier, Rhineland-Palatinate, Germany
- Other names: "Queen of the Nürburgring"; Sabine Reck (name used prior to 2000)
- Occupations: Racing driver, television personality
- Television: Top Gear
- Spouse: Klaus Abbelen

Sabine Schmitz (German: [zaˈbi.nə ʃmɪt͡s]; formerly Reck; 14 May 1969 – 16 March 2021) was a German professional motor racing driver and television personality. She was born in Adenau to a family in the hotel and catering business, and raised in one of the villages nestled within the Nürburgring. She initially trained to join the same profession as her parents before choosing to begin a career in racing, working as a driver for BMW and Porsche.

Schmitz was known as an expert on the Nürburgring circuit, being the first woman to win a major 24h race overall, and winning two victories in 24h races during the course of her driving career on the circuit. She also became a cult icon on television, following her appearance on BBC's Top Gear, making recurring appearances alongside several of the programme's presenters. In March 2021, Schmitz died of cancer at the age of 51, following a diagnosis in late 2017.

== Career ==
=== Nürburgring ===
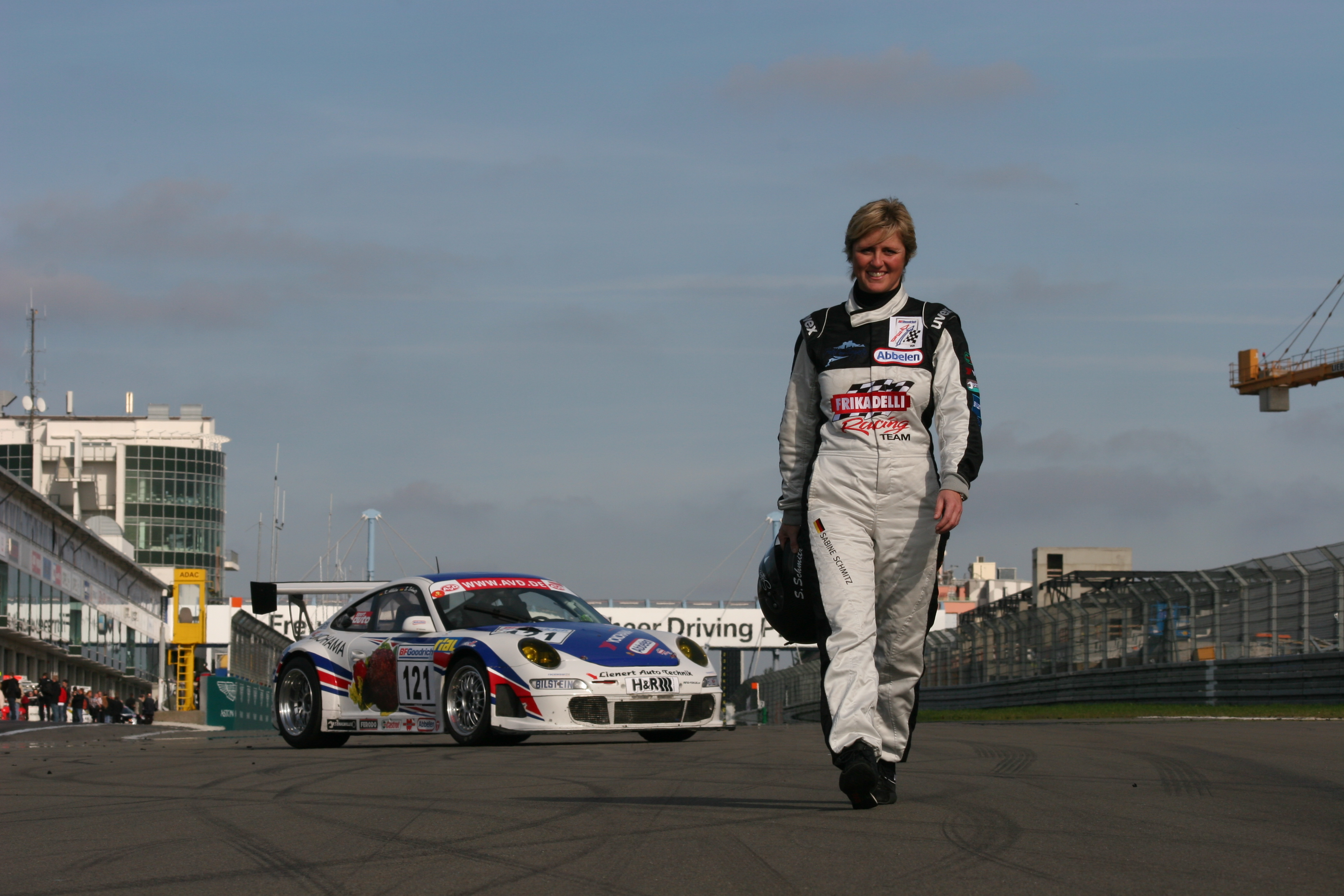
Schmitz posing in front of her Porsche 997 at the Nürburgring pit straight in 2008.

Following occasional drives with the family car on the Nordschleife, all three Schmitz sisters started racing, but only Sabine continued and went on to achieve several notable victories. Schmitz won in CHC and VLN race events, the VLN endurance racing championship in 1998. After getting married and running a hotel in Pulheim near Cologne, she won the 24 Hours Nürburgring in 1996 and 1997 as Sabine Reck, all with a BMW M3 Group N entered and co-driven by local veteran Johannes Scheid. In 2006 Schmitz and Klaus Abbelen drove the #97 Porsche 997 in the Nürburgring VLN endurance racing series, entered by Land Motorsport. They finished third in the 2008 24 Hours of Nürburgring.

Schmitz came to mass public attention driving one of the two BMW M5 "ring taxis" around the 20.8 km (12.9 mi)-long race track in an entertaining manner.

According to her own estimates, Schmitz went around the track more than 20,000 times, increasing by approximately 1,200 per year. Her familiarity with the circuit earned her the nicknames "Queen of the Nürburgring" and "the fastest taxi driver in the world". She said her favourite parts of the track were the Schwedenkreuz (Swedish Cross) and Fuchsröhre (Fox Hole).

Schmitz's company, Nürburgring-based Sabine Schmitz Motorsport, offers advanced driver training and a "ring taxi" service for passengers. Schmitz herself ceased driving the "ring taxi" in 2011.

=== Television career ===
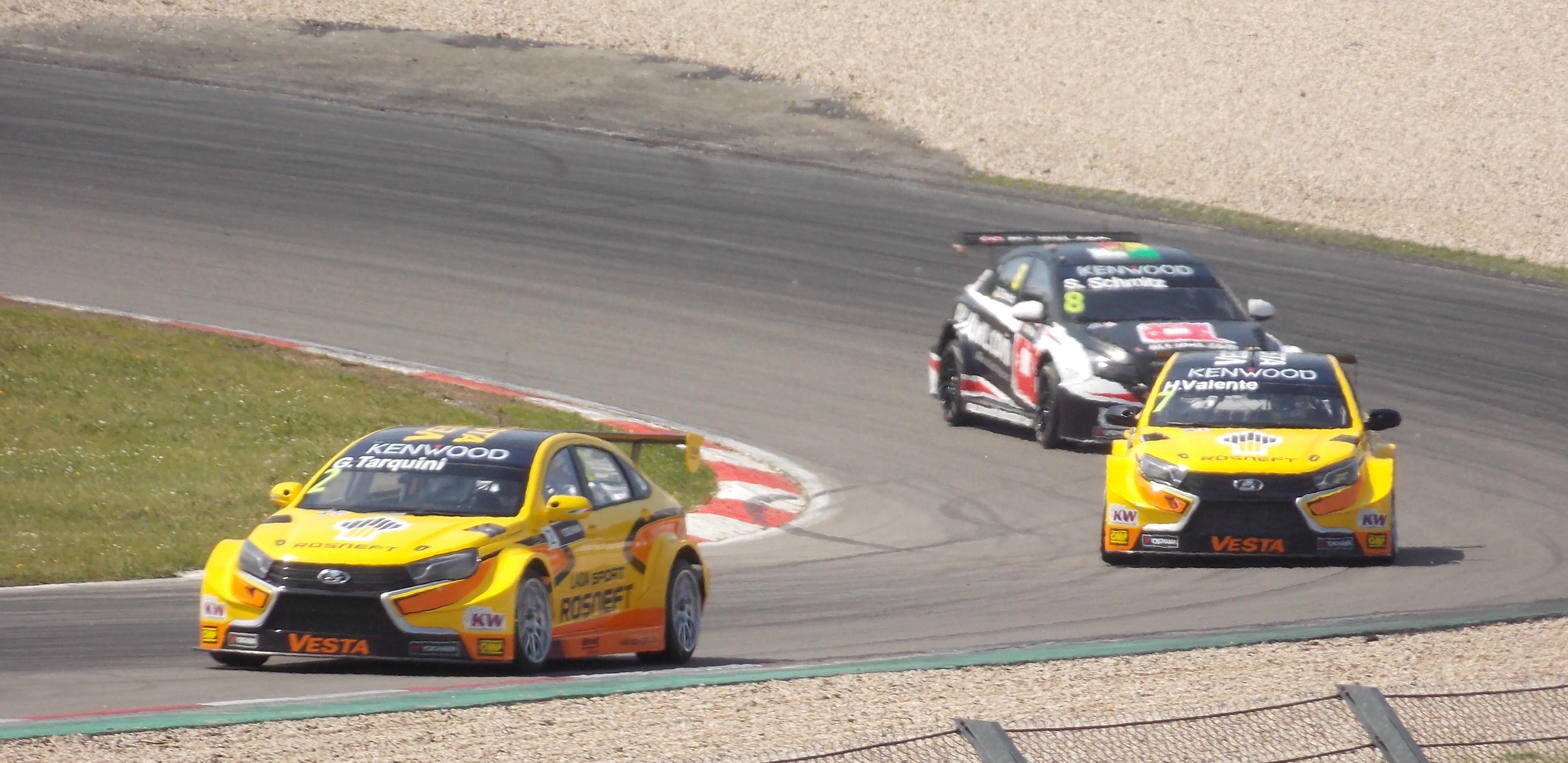
Schmitz chasing two factory Lada Vestas at the 2016 FIA WTCC Race of Germany.

As a result of her popularity as "the fastest taxi driver in the world", and her charisma, Schmitz became an occasional motorsport guest commentator, known for her gleefully dry descriptions of driving incidents. Since September 2006, Schmitz co-hosted a motoring show on German television, D Motor on the DMAX TV channel. In each show, she took on another challenge, for example Schmitz in a Ferrari 360 vs. a 1200 hp Race Truck, or Schmitz in a Formula Renault race car vs. a race sidecar. She also appeared on Fifth Gear.

Schmitz's first appearance on British television was on the 2002 BBC programme Jeremy Clarkson: Meets the Neighbours, where she took Clarkson around the Nürburgring in the "ring taxi".

==== Top Gear ====
In December 2004, Schmitz gained further recognition in the United Kingdom after appearing in the BBC television programme Top Gear with presenter Jeremy Clarkson. After Clarkson (under her tutelage) set a lap time of 9 minutes 59 seconds around the Nürburgring in a Jaguar S-Type diesel (Series 5, Episode 5), she dismissed his best lap with the comment "I tell you something, I do that lap time in the van". She did a lap in the Jaguar S-Type, and set a time of 9 minutes 12 seconds, beating him by 47 seconds. When trying to film Schmitz as she drove the S-Type, the film crew were unable to keep up, and had to get Jaguar test driver Wolfgang Schubauer to drive the Jaguar S-Type R chase car. In a later episode, Schmitz drove a Ford Transit diesel van in an attempt to beat Clarkson's time set in the Jaguar, missing his time by just 9 seconds (Series 6, Episode 7).

In 2008, Schmitz (and fellow D Motor presenters Carsten van Ryssen and Tim Schrick) featured in a Top Gear challenge of "Top Gear Vs the Germans". The Top Gear team faced off against the German team in a series of comedy-based challenges in order to see which team was better.

In March 2015, The Guardian featured a satirical article calling for Schmitz to be the new presenter of Top Gear in order to gracefully cancel the programme, concluding that "She has appeared from time to time on Top Gear in the past, and shown herself to possess exactly the right mix of knowledge and boisterousness for the job every time. Plus, she is both German and a woman, a combination of traits so alien to the majority of Top Gear viewers that the whole programme would probably self-destruct within an hour of her taking the job. And surely, at this point, that would, as they say, be the best outcome for everyone involved."

In December 2015, The Daily Telegraph reported that Schmitz had been selected as a presenter on the revamped Top Gear. This was later confirmed by the BBC in February 2016, along with the announcement of several new presenters for the programme.

== Personal life ==
Born in Adenau to local restaurant owners, Schmitz and her two elder sisters grew up in the "Hotel am Tiergarten" (in the basement of which is the Pistenklause restaurant) in Nürburg within the Nürburgring Nordschleife.

Schmitz trained as a Hotelfachfrau (graduate in hotel and catering business) and sommelière. During her marriage to a hotelier she lived in Pulheim, but after her divorce in 2000, up until 2003, she owned a bar-restaurant in Nürburg named the Fuchsröhre (Foxhole) after a track section. She was also a qualified helicopter pilot.

In July 2020, Schmitz revealed via a Facebook post that she had been suffering from "an extremely persistent cancer" since late 2017. She explained that she had sought treatment and her condition was improving, but she had relapsed and would be undergoing treatment again. At the time of her revelation, Schmitz was still making recurring appearances on Top Gear. She died of cancer at a hospital in Trier on 16 March 2021, aged 51. The Nürburgring have renamed the first corner of the Nordschleife loop as the "Sabine-Schmitz-Kurve" posthumously in her honour.

== Race results ==
=== 24 Hours of Nürburgring ===
Year	Team	Co-Drivers	Car	Class	Laps	Pos.	Class Pos.
1989	(Germany) Selzer Motorsport	(Germany) Dieter Selzer (Germany) Friedrich Scholl	Ford Sierra Cosworth	Class 3	117	31st	4th
1990	(Germany) Asch RS Nachwuchsförderung	(Germany) Franz-Josef Bröhling Jr. (Germany) Susanne Schmitz (Germany) Michael Trunk	Ford Fiesta XR2i	Class 4	32	DNF	DNF
1990	(Germany) Selzer Motorsport	(Germany) Franz-Josef Bröhling Jr. (Germany) Fred Räk (Germany) Dieter Selzer	Ford Sierra Cosworth	Class 6	49	DNF	DNF
1991	(Germany) DSK Ja zum Motorsport	(Germany) Franz-Josef Bröhling (Germany) Dieter Lindenbaum (Germany) Dieter Selzer	Ford Sierra Cosworth 4x4	Class 1	26	DNF	DNF
1991	(Germany) Ford Gerstmann Racing Team	(Germany) Franz-Josef Bröhling Jr. (Germany) Astrid Hild (Germany) Thomas Marschall	Ford Fiesta XR2i	Class 4	109	86th	15th
1992		(Germany) Thomas Beyer (Germany) Bernd Ostmann (Germany) Wolfgang Sander	Ford Escort RS	Class 4	54	134th	15th
1992		(Germany) Axel Hopfengartner (Germany) Mario Hopfengartner (Germany) Thomas Marschall	Ford Fiesta XR2i	Class 5	29	DNF	DNF
1993	(Germany) FINA Tankstellen Team Vogelsang	(Germany) Mario Merten (Switzerland) Philippe Siffert (Germany) Mike Strotmann	BMW 325i	Class 2	118	27th	9th
1994	(Germany) FINA Tankstellen Team Schneider	(Germany) Dirk Adorf (Germany) Markus Gedlich (Germany) Andy Middendorf	BMW 325i	Class 3	100	18th	**3rd**
1996	(Germany) Scuderia Augustusburg Brühl e. V. im ADAC	(Germany) Johannes Scheid (Germany) Hans Widmann	BMW M3 E36	Class 2	135	**1st**	**1st**
1997	(Germany) Scuderia Augustusburg Brühl e. V. im ADAC	(Germany) Johannes Scheid (Germany) Hans-Jürgen Tiemann (Germany) Peter Zakowski	BMW M3 E36	Class 3	126	**1st**	**1st**
1998	(Germany) Scuderia Augustusburg Brühl e. V. im ADAC	(Germany) Johannes Scheid (Germany) Stefan Schlesack	BMW M3 E36	Class 3	130	4th	**1st**
1999	(Germany) Scuderia Augustusburg Brühl e. V. im ADAC (Germany) MSC Adenau e. V. im ADAC	(Germany) Wilhelm-Dieter Kern (Germany) Johannes Scheid	BMW M3 E36 GTRS	A6	74	DNF	DNF
2000	(Germany) Sakura 2000	(Belgium) Vanina Ickx (Germany) Ellen Lohr (Italy) Tamara Vidali	Honda S2000	A7	64	DNF	DNF
2003	(Germany) OK-Speed Marketing.com Hammer Sport	(Germany) Helmut Dähne (Germany) Ossi Kragl (Germany) Jürgen Müller	Mini Cooper	A2	108	91st	4th
2004	(Germany) OK-Speed Marketing.com Hammer Sport	(Germany) Ossi Kragl (Belgium) Stéphane Mertens (Germany) Daniel Pfrommer	Mini Cooper	A2	65	DNF	DNF
2005	(Germany) DSK Ja zum Motorsport e.V.	(Germany) Ossi Kragl (Germany) Victor Smolski (Germany) Ralf Zensen	Lotus Elise MPR	A3	99	115th	25th
2006		(Germany) Klaus Abbelen (Germany) Andy Bovensiepen (Germany) Heinz Dieter Schornstein	Porsche GT3	SP7	87	DNF	DNF
2007	(Germany) Manthey Racing GmbH	(Germany) Klaus Abbelen (Germany) Edgar Althoff	Porsche 997 GT3	SP7	47	DNF	DNF
2008	(Germany) Sabine Schmitz	(Germany) Klaus Abbelen (Germany) Kenneth Heyer (Germany) Edgar Viersen	Porsche 997	SP7	145	**3rd**	**3rd**
2009	(Germany) Frikadelli Racing Team	(Germany) Klaus Abbelen (Germany) Edgar Althoff (Germany) Kenneth Heyer	Porsche 997 GT3 RSR	SP7	149	6th	**2nd**
2010	(Germany) Frikadelli Racing Team	(Germany) Klaus Abbelen (Germany) Edgar Althoff (Germany) Dieter Schornstein Jr.	Porsche 997 GT3 RSR	SP7	122	DNF	DNF
2011	(Germany) MSC Adenau e.V.	(Germany) Klaus Abbelen (Germany) Tim Bergmeister (Germany) Niclas Kentenich	Porsche 997 GT3 R	SP9	152	9th	6th
2011	(United Kingdom) RJN Motorsport	(Germany) Holger Eckhardt (Germany) Michael Krumm (Japan) Tetsuya Tanaka	Nissan 370Z	SP8	122	82nd	4th
2012		(Germany) Klaus Abbelen (Germany) Christopher Brück (Netherlands) Patrick Huisman	Porsche 997 GT3 R	SP9	151	6th	6th
2013		(Germany) Klaus Abbelen (Germany) Christopher Brück (France) Patrick Pilet	Porsche 997 GT3 R	SP9	84	16th	12th
2014	(Germany) Frikadelli Racing Team	(Germany) Klaus Abbelen (Netherlands) Patrick Huisman (France) Patrick Pilet	Porsche 997 GT3 R	SP9	41	DNF	DNF
2015	(Germany) Frikadelli Racing Team	(Germany) Jörg Bergmeister (Netherlands) Patrick Huisman (France) Patrick Pilet	Porsche 997 GT3 R	SP9	45	DNF	DNF
2016	(Germany) Frikadelli Racing Team	(Germany) Klaus Abbelen (Netherlands) Patrick Huisman (Austria) Norbert Siedler	Porsche 991 GT3 R	SP9	50	DNF	DNF
2017	(Germany) Frikadelli Racing	(Germany) Klaus Abbelen (Germany) Alex Müller (Germany) Andreas Ziegler	Porsche 991 GT3 R	SP9	152	16th	15th

=== South African Touring Car Championship ===
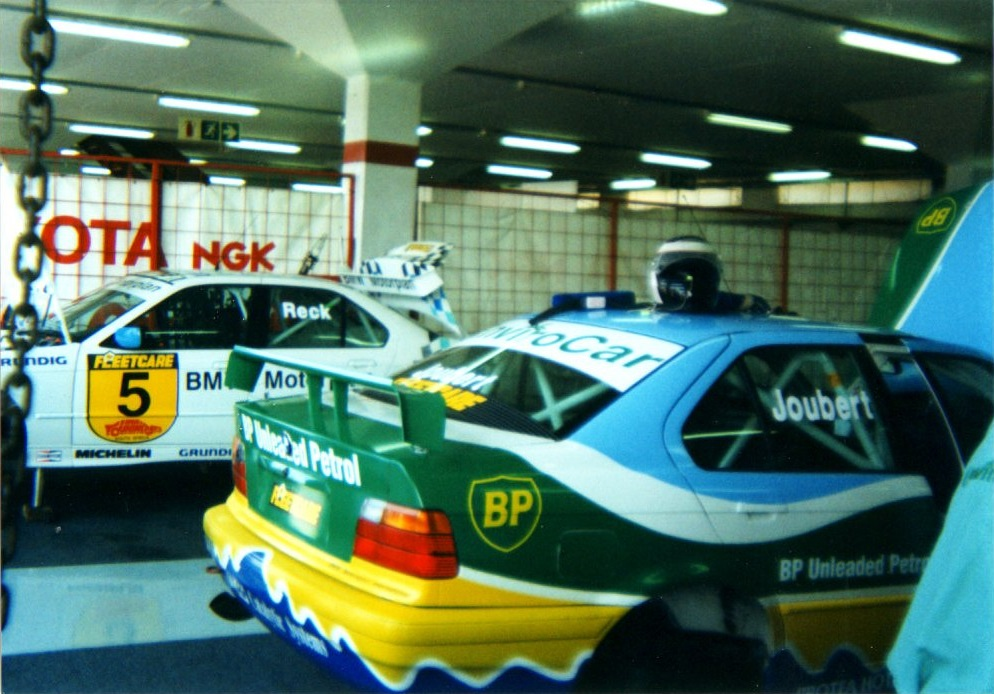
The BMW 318iS Super Touring cars of Deon Joubert and Sabine Schmitz, photographed at Kyalami during October 1995.

Schmitz, competing under her married name of Sabine Reck, contested the 1995 AA Fleetcare Super Touring Championship, driving an E36 BMW super touring car for BMW SA Motorsport alongside teammates Deon Joubert and Shaun Van Der Linde.

Despite high expectations, Schmitz did not find success in the South African championship. She was consistently outqualified and outpaced by Joubert and Van Der Linde, both of whom had extensive experience of the race tracks on which the series was run. A mid-season crash of Schmitz and Toyota driver Mike White at Killarney during an open practice session resulted in neck injuries and an injured right knee, forcing her to sit out three consecutive race meetings. At the end of the 1995 season, Schmitz finished last in the Class A points standings, with no race wins, pole positions or fastest laps. She did not return for the 1996 season.

=== World Touring Car Championship ===
(key) (Races in bold indicate pole position) (Races in italics indicate fastest lap)

Year	Team	Car	1	2	3	4	5	6	7	8	9	10	11	12	13	14	15	16	17	18	19	20	21	22	23	24	DC	Points
2015	All–Inkl.com Münnich Motorsport	Chevrolet RML Cruze TC1	ARG 1	ARG 2	MAR 1	MAR 2	HUN 1	HUN 2	GER 1; 10	GER 2; 11	RUS 1	RUS 2	SVK 1	SVK 2	FRA 1	FRA 2	POR 1	POR 2	JPN 1	JPN 2	CHN 1	CHN 2	THA 1	THA 2	QAT 1	QAT 2	23rd	1
2016	All-Inkl.com Münnich Motorsport	Chevrolet RML Cruze TC1	FRA 1	FRA 2	SVK 1	SVK 2	HUN 1	HUN 2	MAR 1	MAR 2	GER 1; 10	GER 2; 11	RUS 1	RUS 2	POR 1	POR 2	ARG 1	ARG 2	JPN 1	JPN 2	CHN 1	CHN 2	QAT 1	QAT 2			22nd	1
