= Billy Baxter (motorcyclist) =

British motorcyclist

Billy Baxter, born 1963 or 1964 (age 60–61), served with the 1st Regiment Royal Horse Artillery in Bosnia. Whilst serving in 1997, he lost his sight after contracting a rare disease which destroyed both of his optic nerves.

On 2 August 2003, he set the blind solo world land speed record on a motorbike with a speed of 164.87mph (265.33km/h). On 17 August 2013 Baxter lost his record to Stuart Gunn of Edinburgh, who managed a speed of 167.1 mph (268.92 km/h) at Elvington air strip.

In 2004, he was a guest on the BBC television programme Top Gear and drove a lap of their circuit as the "Star in a Reasonably Priced Car", credited as the "Blind Man". He was guided around the circuit by the host, Jeremy Clarkson, and his official lap time was 2:02 minutes, which is faster than two of the fully sighted contestants (Terry Wogan and Richard Whiteley). Ex-Stig Ben Collins however stated in his autobiography that during practice sessions Baxter completed the lap in a time of 1 minute and 58 seconds.

For the past few years, Baxter has been involved with various blind charities as a public speaker, educating groups of all ages about being blind as well as discussing his life experiences so far. He is currently enjoying life with full intensity, taking part in motorcycle riding, PSHE, learning to ski, and is now enjoying amateur dramatics.

In 2007 he completed a Blind Solo Lap of Donington Park. "My biggest challenge yet, I rode my Ducati Monster around the hallowed circuit of Donington, the home of motorcycle racing, raising awareness for Vista, a charity helping blind people in the Midlands, an amazing experience and great fun."

Baxter was appointed the official Town Crier of Llandudno, North Wales by Llandudno Town Council in 2014.
