= XXP =

Defunct German television channel

Programming
- Picture format: 576i (4:3 SDTV)

Ownership
- Owner: Spiegel TV/dctp (until 2006); Discovery Communications (from 2006)

History
- Launched: 7 May 2001; 23 years ago
- Closed: 31 August 2006; 18 years ago
- Replaced by: DMAX

Links
- Website: www.xxp.tv

XXP was a German documentary TV channel headquartered in Berlin.

It was started in 2001 by Spiegel TV and dctp. It broadcast documentaries, magazine shows and reports, discussions and interviews. There was also a daily news program. The programs mainly came from Spiegel TV, dctp, BBC, Süddeutsche Zeitung.

In January 2006 Discovery Communications bought the TV station. It was replaced in September 2006 by DMAX.

The station was available on satellite (Astra 19.2°E) and certain cable TV networks.

== Audience share ==
	January	February	March	April	May	June	July	August	September	October	November	December	Annual average
2002	-	-	-	-	-	-	-	-	-	-	-	-	0.0%
2003	0.0%	0.1%	0.1%	0.1%	0.1%	0.1%	0.1%	0.1%	0.1%	0.1%	0.1%	0.1%	▲0.1%
2004	0.1%	0.1%	0.1%	0.1%	0.1%	0.1%	0.1%	0.1%	0.1%	0.1%	0.1%	0.1%	0.1%
2005	0.1%	0.1%	0.2%	0.2%	0.1%	0.2%	0.2%	0.2%	0.2%	0.2%	0.2%	0.1%	▲0.2%
2006	0.2%	0.3%	0.3%	0.4%	0.4%	0.3%	0.4%	0.4%	-	-	-	-	▲0.3%
