= Die Ludolfs – 4 Brüder auf'm Schrottplatz =

German television series

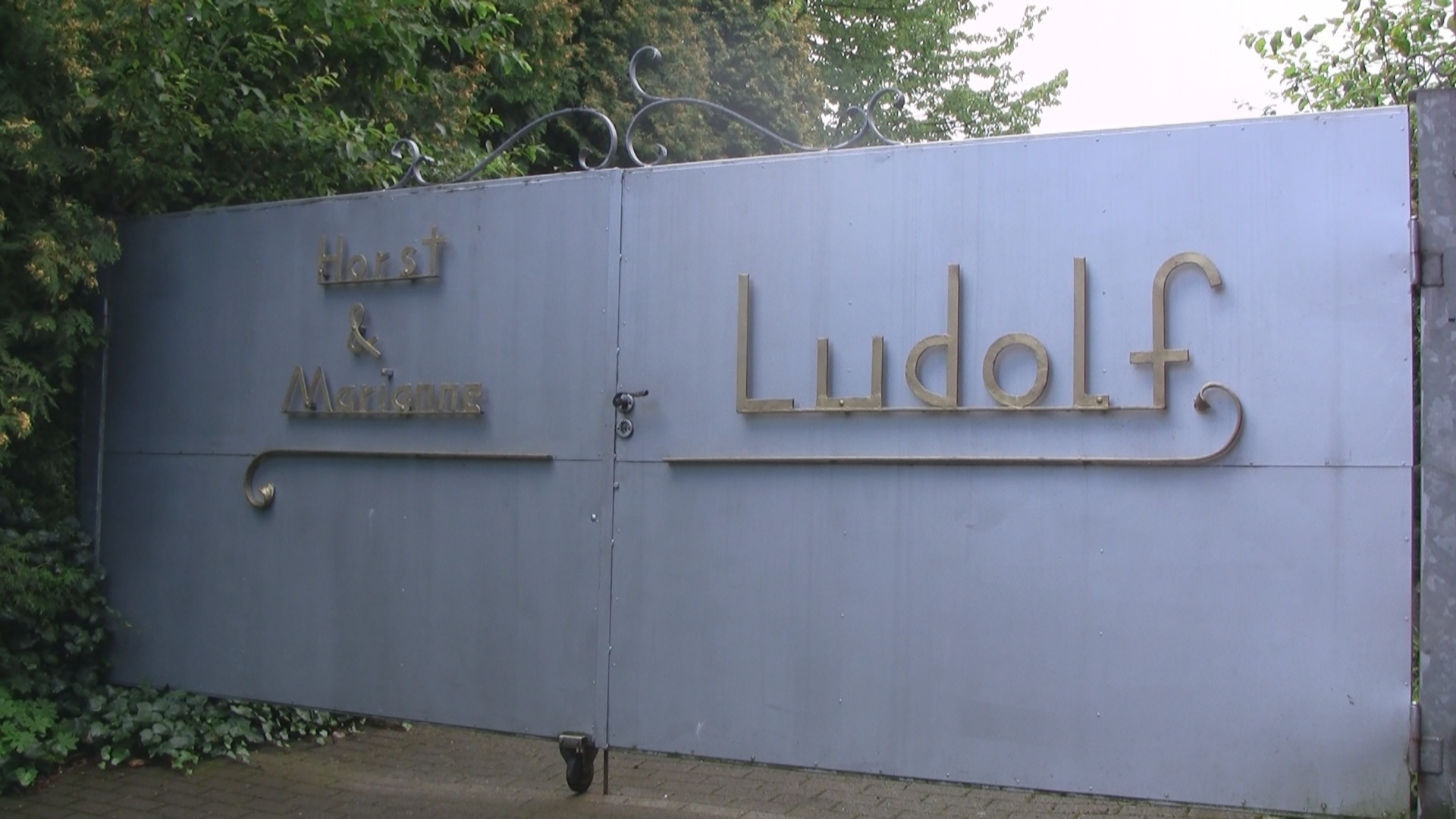
- Die Ludolfs
- Country of origin: Germany
- No. of seasons: 8
- No. of episodes: 92+

Production
- Running time: 42 minutes

Original release
- Network: DMAX
- Release: 2006 – 2011

Peter Ludolf
- Born: 5 August 1955 (age 69)
- Years active: 2002-present

Manfred Ludolf
- Born: 29 July 1962 (age 62)
- Years active: 2002-present

Uwe Ludolf
- Born: 27 September 1951 (age 73)
- Years active: 2002-present

Horst-Günter Ludolf
- Born: 22 February 1954
- Died: January 31, 2011 (aged 57)
- Years active: 2002-2011

Die Ludolfs – 4 Brüder auf’m Schrottplatz (The Ludolfs - 4 Brothers on the Junkyard) is a documentary-styled reality TV series produced by Preview Production GBR and shown on DMAX in Germany. The show is about the four brothers, Uwe (born 27 September 1951), Horst-Günter (born 22 February 1954), Peter (born 5 August 1955) and Manfred "Manni" (born 29 July 1962) Ludolf.

Günter Ludolf died on January 31, 2011.

== History ==
In 2002, the German public TV station SWR Fernsehen intended to make a documentary on Dernbach (Landkreis Neuwied in the Westerwald). During filming, the mayor sent the journalists to the Ludolfs and a short portrait of the family (including the mother, who was still alive) was produced. After that, the SWR decided to produce a two-part-documentary (30 minutes each) under the title Schrott-Brüder – Die Autoverwerter aus dem Westerwald (Junk Brothers - The car recyclers from the Westerwald).

Several private TV stations (such as Kabel 1 and RTL 2) broadcast reports about the unusual family. DMAX later decided to produce an entire TV series about them. The show was so successful that, on New Year's Day 2008, a 24-hour Ludolfs marathon was shown on DMAX. This marathon was repeated on New Year's Day 2009.

On 12 March 2008, a fourth season was launched. The series has also been shown on Dutch and Belgian television (with subtitles) and, since early 2008, on Discovery Russia in Russian synchronization.

=== After Horst-Günter Ludolf's death ===
Following Horst-Günter Ludolf's death in January 2011, 12 episodes starring the three brothers were shown online on bild.de.

In 2012, Sport1 renewed and renamed the series SEK Ludolf - Das Schrott Einsatz Kommando which included 12 episodes and one "best-of".

In January 2016, the series was shown as Die Ludolfs - Das Schrottimperium ist zurück after four years of absence on kabel eins in which only Uwe, his son Tommy and Manfred Ludolf establish a new scrapyard. Peter Ludolf manages the old scrapyard and does not appear in the series.

== The documentary ==
The DMAX television series displays the life and work of the Ludolf brothers, who own a car recycling yard. With their unusual business and lifestyle, the Ludolfs had a certain cult status in their home town long before the series was filmed. They have a reputation for having any used car part that one might need. They organised an open door day in April 2007, an estimated 15,000 to 20,000 people went to view the garage and junk yard resulting in traffic congestion on the nearby A3 motorway.

The stars of the series are Peter, Manfred, Uwe and (Horst-)Günter Ludolf. For over 30 years the brothers, including their father and the company founder, Horst, have collected between two and five million car parts. The parts, stored in a warehouse, are sorted by a homegrown "cluster principle" with only Peter Ludolf knowing which part is in which pile. Each of the four brothers has a specific task. It is up to Peter to locate the desired part whether the customer is at the door or on the phone. Günter answers the telephone and passes on the questions to Peter. Uwe and Manni, "Power and Hand" - a nickname they gave themselves due to the division of labour while disassembling junk cars. They are also responsible for fetching the cars.

The series' charm comes from the different personalities of the brothers and their often comical devotion to their work at the scrap yard. Peter Ludolf lives with his playful and childlike brother, Manni, in the former parental home located on the premises. Günter also lives with Peter and Manni since going through an existential crisis after his wife cheated on him. Günter rarely speaks or leaves the compound, but he smokes heavily and survives on coffee and vitamin tablets. Only lothario Uwe Ludolf leads a bourgeois life with his wife Karin and three adult children, who might possibly take over the company once the brothers retire.

== Cameo appearances ==
In the Daddy Cool issue, rappers Bushido and Kay One are seen asking for a spare part for a Ford Fiesta.

== Episodes ==
Season 1:

- Der Scheunenfund
- Ein Mustang für die Ladies
- Voll der Manta
- Uwe will's nochmal wissen
- Manni weiß was Autos brauchen
- Ein Herz für Günter
- Die letzte Fahrt
- Creme 21
- Oh, du schöner Westerwald
- Ententanz mit 2CV
- Heimweh
- Ludolf Jr.
- Ordnung muss sein

Specials:

- SWR-Reportage: Die Schrott-Brüder 1/2
- SWR-Reportage: Die Schrott-Brüder 2/2
- Die Ludolfs feiern Weihnachten

Season 2:

- Vollgas unter roter Sonne
- Gentlemen, starten Sie die Motoren!
- Mercedes flambé
- Rückwärts schneller als vorwärts
- Herbie vs. Ralleyei
- Der Caravan zieht weiter
- Die Zitrone auf drei Rädern
- Elchtest à la Ludolfs

Season 3:

- Mannis Gedanken zum Klimawechsel
- Peter macht blau
- Das wankelmütige Wunderwerk
- Flower Power in Dernbach
- Der Zwergenaufstand
- In meinem Opel bin ich Kapitän
- BUMMS!
- Una festa nella Spider
- Oben ohne
- Hilfe, die Chinesen kommen
- Der italienische Stier
- Die Ludolfs gehen campen
- Design oder nicht sein
- Landlord vs. Cowboy
- Schneewittchen und die 4 Zwerge
- Der Packesel
- Go East
- Die Nippon-Connection
- Jetzt wird wieder in die Hände gespuckt
- Die Göttin aus Frankreich
- Das Auto des Bösen
- Peter hat Geburtstag
- Balance of Power
- Der Bayerische Herausforderer
- Spezial

Special:

- Die Höhepunkte

Season 4:

- Lang soll er Leben
- Von vorne oder von hinten?
- Es lebe das Haufenprinzip
- Der Römertopf
- Eine Hamburger Herzensangelegenheit
- Das Herz eines Boxers
- Ab in den Süden
- Die neue Bescheidenheit
- Kikeriki – Die Ludolfs auf dem Bauernhof
- Schluss mit lustig
- Franzosensafari
- Deichabenteuer
- Die spinnen, die Engländer
- Heavy Rider
- Crocodile Manni
- Es lebe Europa!

Specials:

- Formel Exclusiv mit den Ludolfs
- Die Ludolfs – Höhepunkte
- Die Ludolfs bei TV-Total
- Die Ludolfs – Schlaflos in Dernbach
- Die 10 beliebtesten Doku-Soaps – Die Ludolfs
- Günter allein zu Haus

Season 5:

- Der runde Baron von Dernbach
- Ich schalte, also bin ich
- Amerika ist überall
- Die silberne Zitrone
- Relax Revolution
- Der Alleskönner
- Das Duell
- Olympische Spiele
- Alles bleibt anders

Season 6:

- Daddy Cool
- Rocket Manni
- Ei, Ei, Ei – Die Ludolfs
- Schatzsuche im Westerwald
- Das Seifenkistenrennen
- Die Ehre der Ludolfs
- Super Cooper
- Die Führerscheinprüfung
- Die 13 schönsten Momente (Best-Of)

Season 7:

- Ein Auto sticht in See
- Der Monstertruck
- Unter den Wolken
- Die Renovierung
- Die Tapeten-Revolution
- Taxi, Taxi
- Im Land der Pommes Frites
- Fünf-Uhr-Tee mit der Queen
- Westerwälder Auto-Träume

Special:

- Die 13 schönsten Momente

Season 8:

- Spiele ohne Grenzen
- Eine Luxussänfte für Manni
- Der mit dem Auto tanzt
- Der heilige Sonntag
- Liebe geht durch den Magen

== DVD box ==
A DVD box of the series called Die Ludolfs was released in April 2007 and contains 12 episodes - three DVDs with four episodes each - the first season without further bonus material. Of the first 13 episodes of the series, the first five ( "Manni knows what cars need") have been released. The episodes do not contain commercials, but the lead ups to the commercials can still be seen.

In October 2007, the second season with eight episodes was released on two DVDs. Another box with 12 episodes of the third season (3.1) was released in March 2008.

In June 2008, the second part of the third season was published (3.2) with 11 episodes on three DVDs.

At the same time, various bonus episodes from the second season such as "Day of open door" and "Christmas with the Ludolfs" were published.

== Movie ==
A Munich-based production company, preview Production, which also produces documentaries on DMAX, planned a feature film called Die Ludolfs - Dankeschön für Italien (The Ludolfs - thank you for Italy) to release in early 2009 which finally came out in April. Filming was done in their native Dernbach and the places they go in Italy.

== Books ==
Two books, Die Ludolfs - Das Buch about the background of the series and Peter's Kochbuch with 40 cooking recipes, have been published. There is also a comic book with the title Die Ludolfs – Der Fluch des Tut Nich Imun.

== Merchandise ==
Articles such as puzzles, coffee mugs, kitchen aprons, baseball caps, sweat shirts and T-shirts are available. For the movie start in the theatres, the toy producer Dickie Toys presented a line of toys displaying a miniature edition of the Ludolfs and some of their cars.
