= Animal Planet (German TV channel) =

German television channel

- Broadcast area: Germany, Austria, Switzerland
- Headquarters: Munich, Germany

Programming
- Language: German
- Picture format: 1080i HDTV (downscaled to 576i for the SD feed)

Ownership
- Owner: Skydance Corporation
- Sister channels: Discovery Channel; DMAX; Eurosport 1 Eurosport 2 Eurosport 2 Xtra; TLC

History
- Launched: 31 March 2004; 22 years ago

Links
- Website: https://www.animalplanet.de

Animal Planet is a German television channel broadcasting programmes about animals, nature, and wildlife to Germany, Austria, and Switzerland.

An agreement to launch the channel exclusively on the Premiere platform was signed by Discovery Networks Deutschland and Premiere in October 2003. The channel launched at 9 pm on 31 March 2004. The new Animal Planet logo was adopted in November 2008.

On 30 June 2009 the channel was replaced by its competitor, Nat Geo Wild. This was the result of a new contract between Premiere and Discovery Networks in anticipation of Premiere's relaunch as Sky Deutschland in July. It is now available on cable provider Unitymedia's digital cable network.

== Programming ==
- Animal Planet Report (2006–2008, 2010–2015, 2017)
- Austin Stevens: Snakemaster (Austin Stevens – Der Gefahrensucher) (2005–present)
- Battleground: Rhino Wars (Rhino Wars – Kampf den Wilderern) (2014–present)
- Jockeys (2010–present)
- K-9 Cops (2011–present)
- Lone Star Law (Lone Star Law – Die Gesetzeshüter von Texas) (2017–present)
- Pet Rescue (S.O.S. Tiernotruf) (2004–present)
- The Jeff Corwin Experience (Jeff Corwins tierische Abenteuer) (2004–present)
- The Zoo (Bronx Zoo – Tierpark der Superlative) (2017–present)
