= Top Gear test track =

Car test track in Surrey, United Kingdom

Top Gear track
- Top Gear test track
- Location: Dunsfold Aerodrome, Dunsfold, Surrey, England
- Coordinates: 51.1164°N 0.5417°W

Road circuit
- Length: 2.82 km (1.75 mi)
- Turns: 12

Drag strip
- Length: 2.83 km (1.76 mi)
- Turns: 1

Short circuit
- Turns: 4

Rally circuit

The Top Gear test track located at Dunsfold Aerodrome in Surrey, United Kingdom was used by the BBC automotive television programme Top Gear. The track was designed by Lotus Cars as a testing facility, with many of its Formula One cars tested there. It was used to test both cars and drivers seen on the programme, mainly in Power Laps and Star in a Reasonably Priced Car.

For the 23rd series of Top Gear the track was expanded with a rallycross section for the "Star in a Rallycross Car" segment, but it was abandoned at the end of series 23.

In December 2016 planning permission was granted for 1,800 homes to be built on the current site of the aerodrome. As part of the redevelopment, it was proposed that the track (and associated aerodrome infrastructure such as the runway drag strip) was to be demolished.

== Layout ==
The track was on a former Royal Canadian Air Force airbase constructed during the Second World War and later used by British Aerospace (and its predecessors) as a manufacturing and test facility. The track's main route, marked by painted lines and simple structures such as stacks of tyres, was designed by test drivers from Lotus. The layout of the track was designed to put the car through various conditions, ranging from provoking understeer to testing brake balance and tyres. The track is approximately 1.75 miles (2.82 km) long. It was considered to be an equaliser for cars since, according to Richard Hammond, both 0–60 miles per hour (0–96.6 km/h) times and top speed are totally meaningless. The track also incorporated a drag strip; although this was not used for timed segments, it did feature in some challenges and other features on the show.

The course started on the perimeter road outside the Top Gear studio. The first bend was a fast right-left kink named "Crooner Curves." "Willson Bend" was the first proper turn on the track and the first corner usually seen when The Stig is lapping a car. "Chicago", a long right-hand around a tyre wall onto the main runway, was designed by Lotus as a steady state corner, designed to highlight understeer or oversteer of the chassis. Next was "Hammerhead", a left-then-right corner, which again highlighted understeer and oversteer. The track came to a right-hand curve, then the course turned right through the flat-out section called the "Follow Through" (it resembles turns 11 and 12 of the Albert Park Circuit). After the left hand "Bentley Bend" named after the person who first "discovered" Jeremy Clarkson and former Top Gear presenter, Jon Bentley, but commonly referred to simply as "the tyres", the course came to "Bacharach Bend", which, after the first series, was referred to as the "Penultimate Corner" or the "Second-to-last Corner" and is often regarded as one of the most challenging on the course. The final turn before the finish line was "Gambon" in honour of Sir Michael Gambon, who completed the turn on two wheels in episode 8 of Series 1. Prior to this, the corner was known as "Carpenters Corner".

== Usage ==
The track was used routinely for the Star in a Reasonably Priced Car and Power Laps segments on Top Gear. It also served myriad roles in other portions of the programme, especially in testing cars and in challenges. When testing cars, they were often driven around the airfield by the presenters. Afterwards, they were taken around the test track by The Stig to set a lap time. Occasionally, drag races and speed tests were held on the runway.

Cars acquired during challenges often posted lap times (driven by either one of the presenters or The Stig) around the track against either a target time or a time set by The Stig in another vehicle. During many challenges, the track was used in more unorthodox fashions — for instance, serving as a makeshift motorway lane during a challenge testing tailgating prowess with vans.

== Power Laps ==
Power Laps was a segment of the programme in which The Stig completed a lap around the track in a reviewed car to compare its performance to previous contenders.

To be eligible to appear on the Power Lap Times board, a vehicle must have been a road-legal production car and must have had sufficient ride height to clear a standard speed bump, although occasionally vehicles that do not appear to qualify for the list are still timed. Whenever a non-qualifying vehicle was raced, the time was compared to the official Power Laps but then removed from the board, for example—the Ferrari FXX owned by Michael Schumacher (1:10.7) was taken off the board after because it both failed to meet road legal standards and used slick tyres.

All laps were timed with the car's manufacturer-provided adjustable settings configured for maximum performance—all adjustable suspensions being set at their most efficient, all gear shift maps at their most aggressive, and driving aids such as traction control deactivated. Lap times did not offer complete comparisons between the cars, mainly because wet or otherwise poor weather conditions can negatively affect lap times.

=== The Power Board ===
Time	Vehicle	Episode
01:09.6	Aston Martin Valkyrie	Stig Laps series
01:09.84	Praga Bohema	Ben Collins
01:10.9	Koenigsegg Jesko Attack	Stig Laps series
01:11.3	Ferrari SF90 Stradale Assetto Fiorano	Series 29, Episode 01
01:12.7	Ferrari 488 Pista	Series 27, Episode 01
01:12.8	Dallara Stradale	Series 27, Episode 03
01:13.4	Porsche 991 GT2 RS	Series 26, Episode 03
01:13.7	McLaren 675LT	Series 23, Episode 02
01:13.8	Pagani Huayra	Series 19, Episode 01
01:14.3	BAC Mono	Series 20, Episode 02
01:15.1	Ariel Atom V8 500 (moist - first appearance of new white Stig)	Series 16, Episode 01
01:15.1	Dodge Viper ACR	Series 23, Episode 01
01:15.1	McLaren 600LT	Series 27, Episode 01
01:15.7	Audi R8 V10 Plus	Series 23, Episode 03
01:15.8	Lamborghini Huracán LP610-4	Series 22, Episode 01
01:16.0	Mercedes-AMG GT R (partly damp)	Series 24, Episode 06
01:16.1	Porsche 991 GT3 RS	Series 24, Episode 06
01:16.2	McLaren MP4-12C	Series 17, Episode 03
01:16.5	Lamborghini Aventador LP700-4	Series 17, Episode 06
01:16.6	Maserati MC20	Series 32, Episode 04
01:16.8	Bugatti Veyron Super Sport	Series 15, Episode 05
01:17.1	Gumpert Apollo S	Series 11, Episode 06

Due to the size of the list, only the top 20 are shown. See List of Top Gear test track Power Lap Times for the full list.

The second most powerful production car ever featured on Top Gear, the 1001 PS (987 bhp; 736 kW) Bugatti Veyron, was taken around the track by The Stig in Series 12, Episode 4, after 3 years of waiting. However, it disappointed the team by only managing fifth place on the Power Board, an unexpectedly low position ultimately attributed to the car's kerb weight of 1,888 kg (4,162 lb), more than any of the four faster cars. In Series 15 Episode 5 however, the Stig took the 1,200 PS Super Sport version around the track in 1:16.8, thus setting a new lap record.

For the 1:17.6 lap, the Koenigsegg CCX was fitted with an optional rear spoiler to provide downforce after The Stig spun the unmodified version off the track. The Stig allegedly recommended this modification, correctly predicting that the car would then be the fastest ever round the track, although Koenigsegg stated that the improvement was due to other adjustments.

=== Lap times of non-qualifying vehicles ===
A "non-qualifying" vehicle was one that did not meet the requirements to remain on the board; that is, one that was not a "road car", which according to Top Gear meant being: available to buy, fully road-legal (lights, indicators, registration, profile tyres, etc.), and street-worthy (i.e. able to negotiate a speed bump).

1. 0:31.2 – BAE Sea Harrier (Piloted by Lieutenant Nick Arkle RN. Raced against the Saab 9–5 Aero. Took off then flew around track, ended in the air.)
2. 0:55.9 – McMurtry Spéirling
3. 0:59.0 – Renault R24 Formula One car (Wet)
4. 1:03.8 – Lotus T125
5. 1:05.3 – Ford SuperVan 4.2
6. 1:07.2 – McLaren 720S GT3X
7. 1:08.5 – Pagani Zonda R
8. 1:08.6 – Aston Martin DBR9
9. 1:10.6 – Caparo T1
10. 1:10.7 – Ferrari FXX (Driven by Michael Schumacher on slick tyres)
11. 1:14:0 – Lamborghini Sesto Elemento
12. 1:15.2 – Aston Martin Vulcan (Damp) (Jokingly added by Chris Evans to a "Naughty Laps" board)
13. – CAP 232 Aerobatic Plane (Piloted by British Aerobatic Champion, Tom Cassells. Raced against the Radical SR3 and was shown crossing the finish line in front, however the time was not shown.)
14. 1:19.1 – Radical SR3
15. 1:22.6 – Westfield XTR2
16. 1:46.0 – James Bond's Aston Martin DB5

The Caparo, Radical, and Westfield are road-legal in the UK but are unable to clear a speed bump. According to Caparo, the car driven by Top Gear was a prototype that did not feature the adjustable ride height found on the production model. Because The Stig set his time in the non-adjustable prototype and the production version has not been driven around the track, the Caparo's time remains ineligible for the Power Lap board.

=== Non-Top Gear laps ===
Occasionally attempts at the Power Lap record are made without the support of the BBC. The following laps of Dunsfold were recorded, filmed and promoted independently of the Top Gear television programme.

1. 1:05.3 – Nissan ZEOD RC (Driven by Wolfgang Reip in hybrid mode)
2. 1:09.9 – Ultima GTR720 (Officially an anonymous driver, on slick tyres. Ultima came back on 19 October 2009 and beat both their previous time and that of the £1.1-million Ferrari FXX track car)
3. 1:12.6 – McLaren 720S – Series 25
4. 1:12.8 – Ultima GTR720 (Anonymous driver, on road tyres, sponsored by Ultima Sports.)
5. 1:13.6 – Nissan ZEOD RC (driven by Wolfgang Reip in electric vehicle mode)
6. 1:14.2 – LaFerrari (driven by Jason Plato on 12 June 2015 as "The Stink" in the TFI Friday revival special on a slightly damp track)
7. 1:15.8 – Ariel Atom 4R (Driven by Ex-Stig Ben Collins on DriveTribe)
8. 1:17.4 – Caterham 7 CSR 260 (driven by Rob Jenkinson, sponsored by Dunlop Tyres – Injection)

Ultima say that their motive for running a non-televised lap was that they felt that the GTR was being specifically ignored by the producers of Top Gear.

== Star in a Reasonably Priced Car ==
=== Star in a Reasonably Priced Car (series 1–22) ===
"Star in a Reasonably Priced Car" was a recurring segment on Top Gear. During most programmes, a celebrity (usually, but not exclusively of British fame) is interviewed by Jeremy Clarkson. Discussion is normally amusing, and focuses on car-related matters, such as the celebrity's car history. Then Clarkson and the studio audience watch the guest's fastest lap on the Top Gear test track, after which Clarkson puts the celebrity's time on the time board.

==== Suzuki Liana (2002–2006) ====
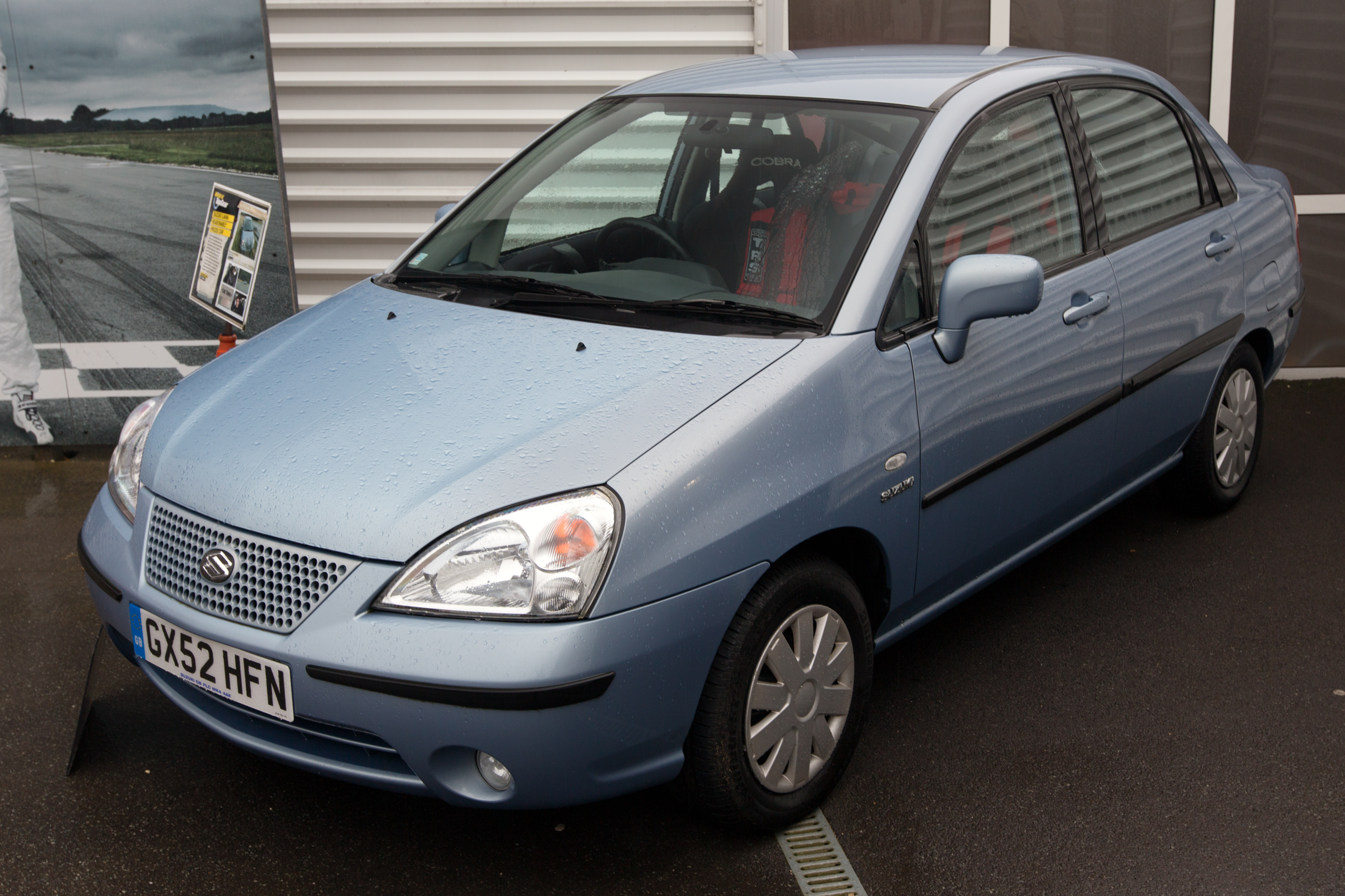
Top Gear's Suzuki Liana

For the first seven series the car driven for lap times was a Suzuki Liana. When first introduced, the car was worth £9995. The car used is stock except for a roll cage and racing seats added as safety measures. Each guest practises with The Stig before making several attempts to complete the test track in the fastest time. The guest does not learn their time until the interview. Practice laps, crashes and the drivers' facial expressions are also shown during the segment.

The two slowest laps on the Liana celebrity list are held by Terry Wogan and Richard Whiteley, both of whom were beaten by Billy Baxter, a blind Bosnian war veteran. He guided the Liana through the track under direction from Clarkson in the passenger seat in a time of 2 minutes 2 seconds, which was 1.4 seconds quicker than Terry Wogan, and 4 seconds faster than Richard Whiteley.

The fastest non-professional driver was Ellen MacArthur. Unlike most contenders she made no comments to the camera during her lap. She completed the lap in 1 minute 46.7 seconds, beating Jimmy Carr by 0.2 seconds. The current fastest professional driver in the Liana is Daniel Ricciardo with 1:42.2.

The Liana endured considerable abuse from the stars while undertaking their laps. In one incident, actor Michael Gambon clipped the final corner, taking the car onto two wheels. It was done in such a spectacular fashion that the corner was named "Gambon Corner". When Lionel Richie drove the Liana, one of the front wheels fell off, invoking Clarkson to coin the term "pulling a Lionel". Trevor Eve also lost a wheel. The former British transport minister Stephen Ladyman added further injury to the Liana by denting the boot when he lost control during practice and slid backwards into a tyre wall. David Soul destroyed the gearbox of two Lianas during his time on the show due to his rough driving style. Patrick Kielty broke the Liana's front suspension during series 4 when he drove on the grass. Christopher Eccleston was the only celebrity to use a Liana with an automatic transmission, because a hesitant Eccleston admitted he was "only qualified to drive an automatic." To accommodate his needs, Top Gear succeeded in borrowing an automatic Liana, of which only 40 existed in the UK. As a reference to his role in Doctor Who, the automatic Liana was shown materialising onto the racing track, with a TARDIS materialisation sound effect played over it.

The Liana has also been modified on several occasions. David Soul's Liana featured a red police light and a white stripe in reference to his Starsky and Hutch role. Johnny Vegas was provided with L-plates as he had not passed his driving test at the time. When Justin Hawkins came on the show, the Liana he drove had flame decals pasted on it. Actor Sanjeev Bhaskar had an ornate tissue box placed in the back, a homage to Indian drivers.

In its service, the Liana covered 1,600 laps of the circuit; went through 400 tyres; its brakes were changed 100 times; and it required six new clutches, two new hubs, driveshafts, wishbones, struts and gear linkages and a replacement wing mirror.

In July 2005, Formula One driver Damon Hill appeared on the show for the first time as the star. This was kept a surprise to the audience and the viewing public, and when Nigel Mansell came on the show, it was covered up in magazines and on the internet by saying that the Star in a Reasonably Priced Car would be Alan Titchmarsh. Since Mansell's appearance the Liana has remained in use as a vehicle reserved for Formula 1 drivers.

For some of the laps more than one person has been present in the car. This was the case for Clarkson's run when he had both Hammond and Jason Dawe in the car. Trinny and Susannah were both in the car for each other's runs. Denise Van Outen was in the car when Johnny Vaughan did his lap; Van Outen never did a lap driving the car. Clarkson was also present as a navigator for Billy Baxter's laps.

===== Liana scoreboard =====
1. 1:44.4 – The Stig
2. 1:46.7 – Ellen MacArthur
3. 1:46.9 – Jimmy Carr
4. 1:47.1 – Simon Cowell
5. 1:47.3 – Ronnie O'Sullivan
6. 1:47.8 – Ian Wright
7. 1:47.9 – Chris Evans
8. 1:47.9 – Rory Bremner (written as Roree)
9. 1:48.0 – Trevor Eve
10. 1:48.0 – Justin Hawkins
11. 1:48.00 – Paul McKenna
12. 1:48.0 – Jodie Kidd
13. 1:48.03 – Jay Kay (Originally to be 1:48.1)
14. 1:48.0 – Patrick Kielty
15. 1:48.6 – Rob Brydon
16. 1:48.8 – Stephen Ladyman
17. 1:49.0 – Neil Morrissey
18. 1:49.7 – Roger Daltrey (mildly moist)
19. 1:50.0 – Martin Clunes
20. 1:50.0 – Jeremy Clarkson (with Richard Hammond and Jason Dawe as passengers) (name written as Jezza)
21. 1:50.0 – Lionel Richie (written as Rich Tea)
22. 1:50.0 – Cliff Richard
23. 1:50.0 – Patrick Stewart
24. 1:50.0 – Jamie Oliver (with opened window)
25. 1:50.0 – Gordon Ramsay
26. 1:50.7 – David Walliams
27. 1:51.0 – Ranulph Fiennes
28. 1:51.1 – Timothy Spall
29. 1:51.2 – Carol Vorderman (mildly moist)
30. 1:51.3 – James Nesbitt
31. 1:51.4 – Christian Slater
32. 1:51.5 – Joanna Lumley
33. 1:51.5 – Omid Djalili
34. 1:51.5 – Sanjeev Bhaskar (wet) (written as Sanjiv)
35. 1:52.0 – David Dimbleby
36. 1:52.0 – Rick Parfitt
37. 1:52.0 – Eddie Izzard
38. 1:52.0 – Jordan
39. 1:52.4 – Christopher Eccleston (automatic) (written as Dr. Who)
40. 1:52.7 – Tim Rice
41. 1:53.0 – Vinnie Jones
42. 1:53.2 – Johnny Vaughan (with passenger Denise van Outen, originally 1:53.4)
43. 1:53.3 – Fay Ripley (mildly moist)
44. 1:53.4 – Bill Bailey (wet)
45. 1:53.5 – Jack Dee
46. 1:54.0 – Steve Coogan (wet, originally stated to be 1:53.0)
47. 1:54.0 – Ross Kemp (wet)
48. 1:54.0 – Alan Davies (mildly damp) or (wet)
49. 1:54.0 – Stephen Fry (mildly moist)
50. 1:54.0 – Tara Palmer-Tomkinson (wet)
51. 1:54.0 – David Soul
52. 1:54.0 – Rich Hall
53. 1:54.0 – Martin Kemp (wet)
54. 1:54.1 – Trinny Woodall (very wet, with passenger Susannah Constantine)
55. 1:55.0 – Michael Gambon (wet)
56. 1:55.4 – Geri Halliwell (written as Harry Jellywell) (wet)
57. 1:55.7 – Susannah Constantine (very wet, with passenger Trinny Woodall)
58. 1:56.0 – Boris Johnson
59. 1:57.0 – Anne Robinson
60. 1:57.0 – Jonathan Ross (penalised for cutting a corner) (wet)
61. 1:57.1 – Davina McCall (very wet)
62. 1:58.6 – Johnny Vegas (provisionally licensed)
63. 2:01.0 – Harry Enfield
64. 2:02.0 – Billy Baxter (blind man with Clarkson as passenger guide)
65. 2:03.4 – Terry Wogan (originally listed as 2:04.0)
66. 2:06.0 – Richard Whiteley

===== Non-Top Gear laps =====
From 2024, Ex-Stig Ben Collins started taking out various automotive YouTubers to race on the Top Gear race track in the Suzuki Liana.

1. 1:44.95 - Mat Armstrong
2. 1:46.7 - Jimmy Broadbent
3. 1:49.8 - Freddy "Tavarish" Hernandez
4. 1:52.81 - Benedict Fowler (Road To Success Podcast)

==== Chevrolet Lacetti (2006–2010) ====
Starting with the eighth series the Liana was replaced by a Chevrolet Lacetti and a new blank scoreboard. The format was changed so that each star would have five practice laps, and then a final timed lap, with no allowance being given for mishaps.

As a starter for the new car and format, an open day was held for any celebrity who wanted to take part. Seven stars recorded times that day: James Hewitt (who Jeremy and Richard referred to as the 'Well Spoken Man' after failing to recognise him), comedians Alan Davies and Jimmy Carr, rock stars Rick Wakeman and Justin Hawkins, footballer Les Ferdinand, and actor Trevor Eve who topped the time at 1 minute 47.0 seconds. Jimmy Carr, who held second place in the Liana behind Ellen MacArthur, spun off while doing his timed lap and got the second slowest time ever around the track at 2 minutes, 8.91 seconds.

On 28 January 2007, Jamie Oliver posted a time of 1:47.70 in melted snow and standing water. Given the rivalry Oliver felt towards fellow celebrity chef, and the lapboard leader, Gordon Ramsay, Oliver asked that the 4-second allowance normally granted for wet laps be used to put him at the top of the leaderboard "just for a day".

Actress Billie Piper posted a time of 1:48.3 but was deemed by The Stig to have failed to complete a lap properly, as she failed to negotiate some corners. The Stig suggested a three-second time penalty, but after Clarkson consulted the audience, it was decided to let the time stand, which her Doctor Who co-star, David Tennant, tried to overturn on 23 December 2007 show, at the end of the following series. Clarkson remarked that if Tennant had worn a see through top (like Piper for her interview), he "would have been faster than Simon Cowell".

In the 11 November 2007 episode, Simon Cowell retook his status as the holder of the fastest lap with a time of 1:45.90. According to Clarkson, the cameramen said they had never seen such consistency in the practice laps. However, Cowell was knocked off the top spot in Series 11 by Jay Kay, who now holds the fastest time in the Lacetti, although Clarkson selected the fastest of Jay Kay's times rather than the last run, which was slower than Cowell's time, seemingly due to a dislike of Cowell (he claimed earlier in the episode that Cowell had been at the top of the leaderboard for too long). Had this not happened, Cowell would have been knocked off the top by Grand Designs host Kevin McCloud.

Clarkson has referred to the part of the board with times of 1:51 and over as the 'Thespian Zone' due to the propensity for classically trained actors to post slow times.

Series 11 featured a slight change to the format, with two 'Stars' per episode instead of the previous one (although there had been a couple of editions in previous series' with more than one guest). Each of the pair are professionally associated with their fellow guest, usually both either act in or present the same TV show. Unlike previous episodes where two stars have appeared, the stars drove individual laps without the other present in the car.

On 28 March 2010, Richard Hammond attended the demolition of the two 550 ft chimneys at Lafarge's Northfleet Cement Works. On the first episode of Series 15, it was shown that the Lacetti was partially crushed by placing it in the path of one of the falling chimneys.

===== Lacetti scoreboard =====
1. 1:45.8 – Jay Kay
2. 1:45.9 – Brian Johnson
3. 1:45.9 – Kevin McCloud
4. 1:45.9 – Simon Cowell
5. 1:46.1 – Jennifer Saunders
6. 1:46.3 – Michael Sheen
7. 1:46.3 – Gordon Ramsay
8. 1:46.5 – Usain Bolt
9. 1:46.9 – Peter Jones
10. 1:47.0 – Trevor Eve
11. 1:47.1 – Peter Firth
12. 1:47.4 – Lawrence Dallaglio
13. 1:47.4 – Les Ferdinand
14. 1:47.5 – Eric Bana (wet)
15. 1:47.6 – James Hewitt (written as "Well Spoken Man")
16. 1:47.7 – Jamie Oliver (melted snow and wet)
17. 1:47.7 – Hugh Grant
18. 1:48.0 – Ewan McGregor
19. 1:48.1 – Rupert Penry-Jones
20. 1:48.1 – Chris Evans (wet)
21. 1:48.3 – James Blunt (wet)
22. 1:48.3 – Billie Piper (cut corner, penalty not added)
23. 1:48.4 – Justin Hawkins
24. 1:48.5 – Simon Pegg
25. 1:48.5 – Theo Paphitis (written as Theo Pamphlet)
26. 1:48.7 – Mark Wahlberg
27. 1:48.7 – Michael McIntyre
28. 1:48.8 – David Tennant
29. 1:48.8 – Jay Leno
30. 1:48.9 – Will Young (damp)
31. 1:49.4 – Michael Parkinson (written as Sir Michael Parky)
32. 1:49.46 – Ronnie Wood
33. 1:49.7 – Harry Enfield
34. 1:49.8 – Sienna Miller
35. 1:49.9 – Jools Holland
36. 1:50.3 – Michael Gambon
37. 1:50.3 – Alan Davies
38. 1:50.9 – Steve Coogan (hot)
39. 1:51.0 – Stephen Fry (hot)
40. 1:51.2 – Alan Carr
41. 1:51.4 – Ray Winstone (hot)
42. 1:51.7 – Keith Allen (very wet)
43. 1:51.7 – Rob Brydon (wet)
44. 1.51.8 – Seasick Steve (moist)
45. 1:51.8 – Justin Lee Collins
46. 1:52.2 – Tom Jones
47. 1:52.5 – Guy Ritchie (very wet)
48. 1:52.8 – Dame Helen Mirren
49. 1:53.4 – James Corden (wet)
50. 1:54.0 – Kristin Scott Thomas
51. 1:54.3 – Philip Glenister (wet)
52. 1:54.7 – Kate Silverton (very wet)
53. 1:55.3 – Rick Wakeman
54. 1:57.4 – Boris Johnson (very wet)
55. 1:57.4 – Fiona Bruce (very wet)
56. 2:01.0 – Brian Cox
57. 2:08.91 – Jimmy Carr (spun off on timed lap)

==== Kia Cee'd (2010–2013) ====
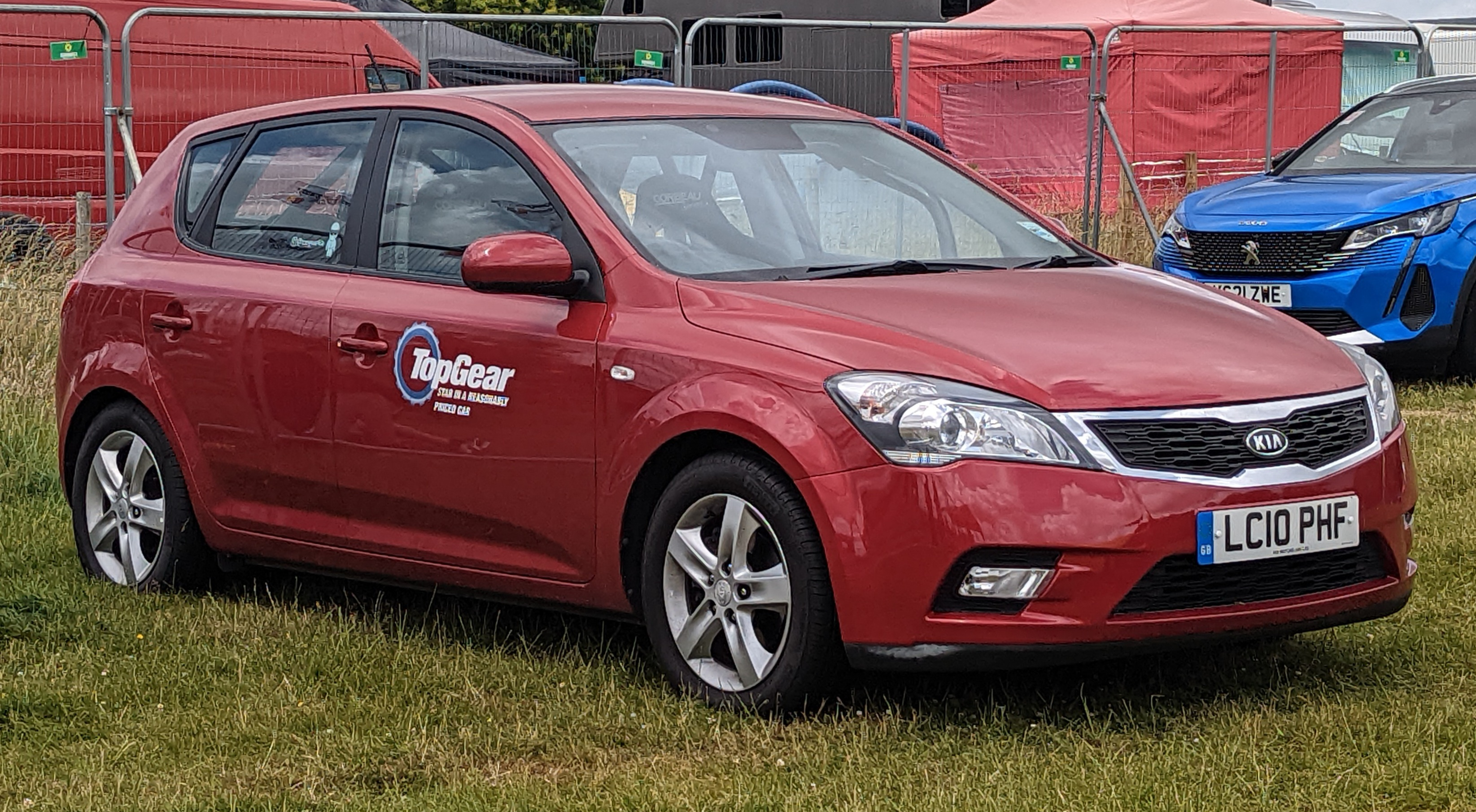
The Kia Cee'd used as a Reasonably Priced Car

In the last episode of the fourteenth series of the show, Clarkson revealed that they were thinking about getting a new Reasonably Priced Car for the next series. On 27 June, during the first episode of the fifteenth series, it was revealed to be the Kia Cee'd and, as with the Chevrolet Lacetti, another open day was held to welcome the new car. Nick Robinson, Peter Jones, Al Murray, Bill Bailey, Peta Todd, Louie Spence, Johnny Vaughan and Amy Williams were among the initial drivers. Clarkson commonly refers to the Kia phonetically as the "Cee-apostrophe-d". Sophie Raworth, Bill Turnbull and Fiona Bruce all did the Star in a Reasonably Priced Car for Children in Need 2012.

===== Cee'd scoreboard =====
1. 1:42.1 – Matt LeBlanc
2. 1:42.2 – Rowan Atkinson
3. 1:42.8 – Michael Fassbender (ice on penultimate corner)
4. 1:42.8 – John Bishop
5. 1:43.5 – Ross Noble
6. 1:43.6 – James McAvoy
7. 1:43.7 – Ryan Reynolds
8. 1:43.7 – Matt Smith
9. 1:44.2 – Tom Cruise
10. 1:44.4 – Amy Macdonald
11. 1:44.5 – Nick Frost
12. 1:44.9 – Simon Pegg
13. 1:45.2 – Cameron Diaz
14. 1:45.2 – Alex James
15. 1:45.4 – Mick Fleetwood
16. 1:45.5 – Rupert Grint
17. 1:45.9 – Peter Jones
18. 1:45.9 – Boris Becker (wet)
19. 1:46.1 – Andy García
20. 1.46.8 – Bill Turnbull (Children in Need 2012)
21. 1:47.00 – Alastair Campbell
22. 1:47.7 – Louis Walsh
23. 1:47.8 – Sophie Raworth (Children in Need 2012)
24. 1:47.8 – Danny Boyle (wet)
25. 1:48.1 – Al Murray
26. 1:48.1 – Bob Geldof
27. 1:49.0 – Jeff Goldblum (did not exit third gear during lap)
28. 1:49.0 – Jonathan Ross (wet)
29. 1:49.4 – will.i.am (wet) (automatic)
30. 1:49.8 – Slash (wet)
31. 1:49.9 – Nick Robinson
32. 1:49.9 – Peta Todd (written as "Peta 23 From Essex"; damp)
33. 1:50.3 – Amber Heard (automatic)
34. 1:50.5 – Fiona Bruce (Children in Need 2012)
35. 1:50.8 – Bill Bailey (written as "Angelina Jolie" on leaderboard, referring to Bailey wearing an "Angelina Jolie" name tag during the open day; wet)
36. 1:50.9 – Amy Williams (wet)
37. 1:53.3 – Johnny Vaughan (wet)
38. 1:53.769 – Louie Spence (wet)
39. 1:56.3 – Alice Cooper (wet + automatic)
40. 1.56.7 – John Prescott (wet + automatic)
41. 2:09.1 – Damian Lewis (snow)

==== Vauxhall Astra (2013–2015) ====
In the first episode of series 20, Clarkson, Hammond and May revealed their new Reasonably Priced Car: a Vauxhall Astra 1.6 Tech Line. In similar fashion to earlier "new starts", an open day was held for multiple stars to drive the car. Following the abrupt end of Series 22 as a result of Clarkson's dismissal from the show, the Astra was returned to Vauxhall before being auctioned off for charity on 27 December 2015 for £17,800.

===== Astra scoreboard =====
1. 1:44.6 – Olly Murs
2. 1:44.7 – Nicholas Hoult
3. 1:44.7 – Aaron Paul
4. 1:45.1 – Brian Johnson
5. 1:45.6 – Jimmy Carr (written as Jimmy Crash)
6. 1:46.1 – Hugh Jackman
7. 1:46.7 – David Haye
8. 1:46.8 – Warwick Davis
9. 1:47.1 – Margot Robbie
10. 1:47.2 – Will Smith
11. 1:47.8 – Benedict Cumberbatch
12. 1:48.5 – Gillian Anderson (mildly moist)
13. 1:48.5 – Rachel Riley
14. 1:48.8 – Charles Dance
15. 1:48.9 – Joss Stone
16. 1:49.2 – Kiefer Sutherland (wet)
17. 1:49.4 – James Blunt (very very wet)
18. 1:49.9 – Tom Hiddleston (very wet)
19. 1:49.9 – Ron Howard
20. 1:50.1 – Hugh Bonneville (wet)
21. 1:51.0 – Steven Tyler
22. 1:51.5 – Mike Rutherford
23. 1:54.3 – Ed Sheeran (automatic; wet)
24. 1.54.5 – Jack Whitehall (automatic; mildly moist)

==== F1 drivers (2002–2015) ====
All Formula One drivers were put into their own list with regard to lap times because of their exceptional skill level. When the Liana was pulled out from retirement to allow Jenson Button to make a time, Clarkson noted that the Liana would be pulled out for use by Formula 1 drivers in the future. The original 'black' Stig and the first 'white' Stig have done laps around the track in the Suzuki Liana. Both had their times removed from the leaderboard upon their departure.

The first Stig was Perry McCarthy, who once test drove for the Williams F1 team, and drove for the ill-fated Andrea Moda Formula One team. The second Stig was Ben Collins; in the first episode of Series 13 the Stig was "revealed" to be Michael Schumacher, although this was a joke in the vein of the rest of his appearance on the show.

On 6 July 2011, Sebastian Vettel managed to top the board with a time of 1:44.0. Vettel's lap was the first time someone taking a 'Formula One drivers' line through the first corner was able to top The Stig's time, as Rubens Barrichello took the tighter line. Clarkson also mentioned on this episode that the current Stig has yet to do a lap of the track in the Liana, therefore there is currently no time on the board for the Stig. On 17 February 2013, Lewis Hamilton returned to do a dry lap and lowered the F1 Drivers record by 1.1s to 1:42.9. This was in the wake of his move to Mercedes AMG for the 2013 season. On 8 February 2015, Daniel Ricciardo topped the board with a lap time of 1:42.2. Ricciardo took the tighter line through the first corner, claiming that it covered less distance.

===== F1 Liana scoreboard =====
1. 1:42.2 – Daniel Ricciardo
2. 1:42.9 – Lewis Hamilton (second attempt)
3. 1:43.1 – Mark Webber (second attempt)
4. 1:44.0 – Sebastian Vettel
5. 1:44.3 – Rubens Barrichello
6. 1:44.4 – Ben Collins (The Stig II; removed from the board)
7. 1:44.6 – Nigel Mansell
8. 1:44.7 – Lewis Hamilton (wet and oily)
9. 1:44.7 – Jenson Button (hot)
10. 1:44.9 – Jenson Button (second attempt; wet)
11. 1.46.0 – Perry McCarthy (The Stig I; removed from the board)
12. 1:46.1 – Kimi Räikkönen (very wet)
13. 1:46.3 – Damon Hill
14. 1:47.1 – Mark Webber (extremely wet)
15. DNF – Michael Schumacher (Joke lap, got "lost"- DNF)

=== Star in a Rallycross Car (series 23) ===
For series 23, "Star in a Reasonably Priced Car" was renamed as "Star in a Rally-Cross Car" segment, with the track expanded to include a "Rallycross" route, featuring the addition of a jump and a water splash obstacle, but retaining the use of some of the corners. Two celebrities were invited to partake in setting a fast lap time with the use of a Mini Rallycross Car. This segment was used only in this series, as following Chris Evans' resignation, it was scrapped due to negative feedback.

==== Mini Rallycross scoreboard ====
1. 1:45.52 – Chris Harris
2. 1:52.6 – Anthony Joshua
3. 1:53.9 – Brian Cox
4. 1:53.9 – Damian Lewis
5. 1:54.4 – Bear Grylls
6. 1:56.3 – Gordon Ramsay
7. 1:57.7 – Kevin Hart
8. 2:01.4 – Sharleen Spiteri
9. 2:10.9 – Jesse Eisenberg
10. 2:12.0 – Patrick Dempsey (monsoon)
11. 2:16.4 – Paul Hollywood (absolutely soaking wet)
12. 2:21.6 – Jennifer Saunders (appalling)
13. 2:27.1 – Greg Davies (abysmal)

=== Star in a Reasonably Fast Car (series 24–28) ===
==== Toyota GT86 (2017–2020) ====
Starting from the twenty-fourth series, the basic format of "Star in a Reasonably Priced Car" was revived following the axing of the rally-cross format, though the name was changed to "Star in a Reasonably Fast Car" due to the use of a more powerful Toyota GT86. Both The Stig and Chris Harris instruct the celebrities on driving the car around the track. Footage of several celebrities who drove the car before the first episode of the twenty-fourth series, was aired on spin-off programme Extra Gear. The segment was dropped in Series 29 to maintain social distancing during the COVID-19 pandemic, and did not return in later series.

===== GT86 scoreboard =====
1. 1:35.4 – Chris Hoy
2. 1:36.1 – Jay Kay
3. 1:37.2 – Stephen Mangan
4. 1.37.5 – Ross Noble
5. 1.38.6 – Matt Baker
6. 1:39.0 – James Marsden
7. 1:39.5 – Max Whitlock
8. 1:40.5 – Mike Tindall (damp, with passenger Zara Tindall)
9. 1:40.6 – Jason Manford
10. 1:41.6 – Zara Tindall (damp, with passenger Mike Tindall)
11. 1:42.7 – Will Young
12. 1:43.4 – Gregory Porter
13. 1:44.0 – David Tennant
14. 1:44.7 – Danny Boyle
15. 1:44.8 – Himesh Patel
16. 1:45.3 – Vicky McClure
17. 1:45.6 – Laurence Fox (wet)
18. 1:45.7 – Ore Oduba
19. 1:46.0 – Professor Green
20. 1:47.1 – James McAvoy (wet)
21. 1:47.2 – Frankie Dettori
22. 1:48.4 – Bob Mortimer
23. 1:50.0 – Ed Byrne (wet)
24. 1:50.4 – Tinie Tempah (wet)
25. 1.50.5 – Rob Brydon (very wet)
26. 1:51.1 – Tom Allen (damp)
27. 1:53.0 – Jon Culshaw
28. 1:53.2 – Dara Ó Briain (wet)
29. 1:53.9 – KSI (very wet)
30. 1:53.9 – Romesh Ranganathan (very wet)
31. 1:55.2 – Lee Mack
32. 1:58.7 – Tamsin Greig (wet)
33. 2:01.9 – Emilia Fox (wet)
34. 2:07.9 – Shazia Mirza

== Appearance in games ==
On 24 October 2007, it was announced that players of the PlayStation 3 game, Gran Turismo 5 Prologue, would be able to download episodes of Top Gear within the game, and that the test track would be one of the included circuits in the full game (Gran Turismo 5).

A very basic yet driveable version of the track appeared around 2003 for the PC racing simulation Grand Prix Legends. There is also a version of the test track for the realistic PC racing simulation rFactor, produced with permission from Dunsfold park. The track has also been produced as an add-on for World Racing 2. and the realistic racing simulator Assetto Corsa.

Top Gear have also added a basic version of the test track on the games section of their own website, with the title of "Be a star in our reasonably priced car". A Top Gear mobile phone game also features the track.

The game Gran Turismo 5, developed by Polyphony Digital features a fully rendered version of the Top Gear track. Players have the ability to drive and race on the track.

The track also appeared in Forza Motorsport 4; the Top Gear logo appeared in a trailer for the game on the Top Gear website. Cars were shown racing in the follow-through section during the E3 2011 trailer. It is known that in the actual game there are options to race on the full track, race both of the rings in separate races and race on Top Gear's drag race mile. There is also an achievement for completing a lap of the Top Gear Test Track in the Kia Cee'd fittingly named "Star in a reasonably priced car".

Forza Motorsport 4's sequel, Forza Motorsport 5, also features the Top Gear test track. The track layouts from Forza Motorsport 4 return, with the exception of the drag race mile, which has been removed. Subsequent games in the series, Forza Motorsport 6 and Forza Motorsport 7, also feature the Top Gear Test Track, with the full track and both separated rings. In these versions, the rings are able to be raced in reverse layout as well, and in both dry and wet conditions.

The track also appears in the mobile game Top Gear – Extreme Parking, and in Automation – The Car Company Tycoon Game as "Airport Track" for players to test their cars on.

== Maps ==
- TopGear.com map and guide to the test track
- TopGearbox.com test track guide
