= Eurosport 2 Xtra (German TV channel) =

German sports television channel

- Country: Germany
- Broadcast area: Germany; Switzerland
- Network: Eurosport
- Headquarters: Munich, Germany

Programming
- Language(s): German
- Picture format: 1080i (HDTV)

Ownership
- Owner: Warner Bros. Discovery
- Sister channels: Eurosport 1 Eurosport 2 Discovery Channel; DMAX; TLC

History
- Launched: 4 August 2017; 7 years ago

Links
- Website: www.eurosport.de

Eurosport 2 Xtra is a German pay-television sports channel which broadcasts several Bundesliga matches and the DFL-Supercup in the seasons 2017/18-2020/21 exclusively which Warner Bros. Discovery won in the tender of national media rights arranged by the Deutsche Fußball Liga (DFL).

== Broadcasting rights ==
=== Football ===
- Bundesliga (thirty games on Friday afternoon at 20:30, five games on Sunday afternoon at 13:30, five games on Monday evening at 20:30 and 4 relegation matches at the end of the season)
- DFL-Supercup

== Distribution ==
Eurosport 2 Xtra is available in HD quality via the Eurosport Player and in the pay-tv offer of HD+ via Astra 19.2°E. The channel is not available in DVB-C, DVB-T or IPTV networks.
