= Hanns Joachim Friedrichs Award =

German journalist prize

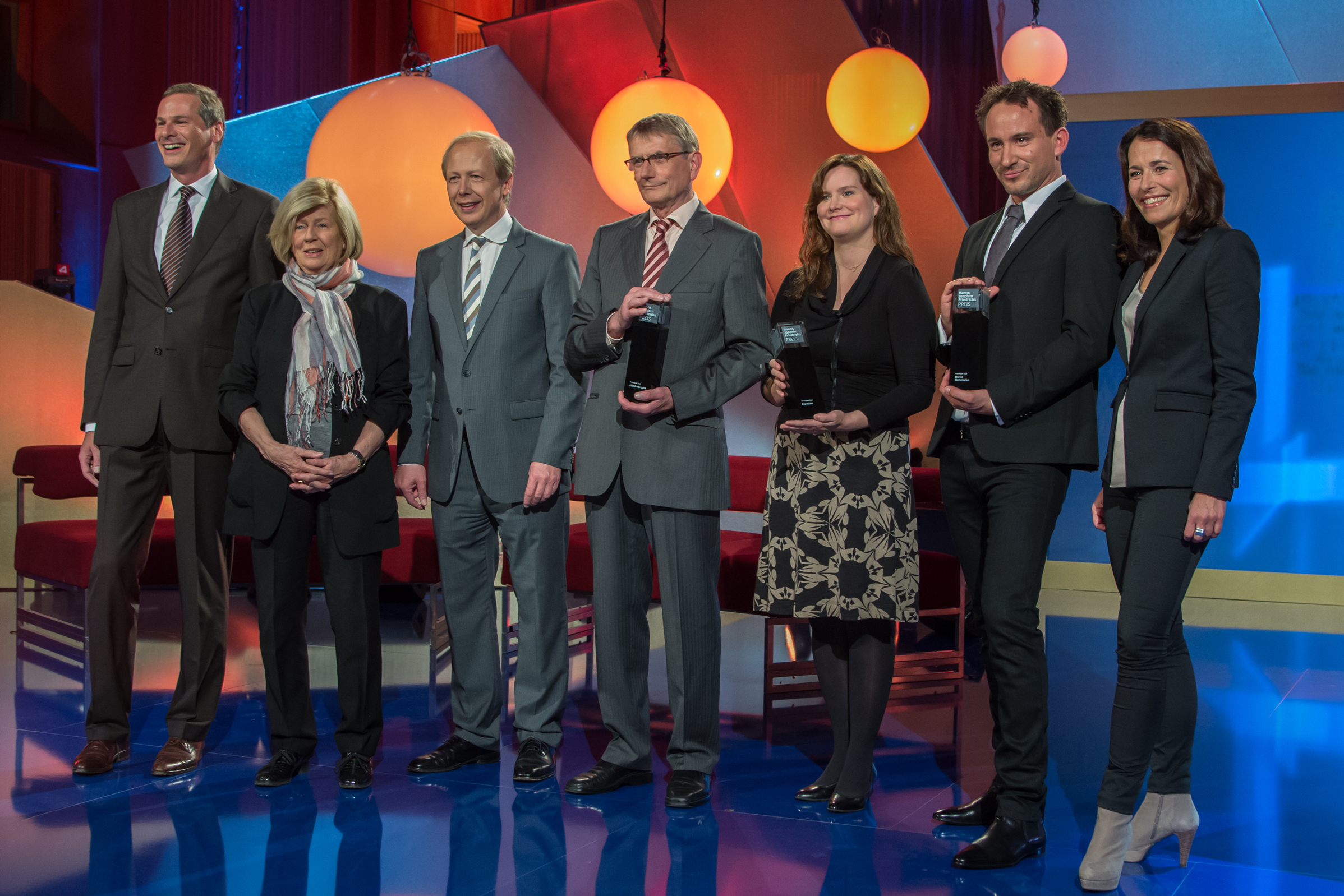
2013 award ceremony. L–R: Georg Mascolo, Ilse Friedrich, Tom Buhrow, Jörg Armbruster, Eva Müller, Marcel Mettelsiefen, Anne Will

The Hanns Joachim Friedrichs Award is a German award for excellence in journalism. It was first awarded in 1995. The award is named for the German journalist Hanns Joachim Friedrichs, who died in the year before the awards had established. The winners of the award are journalists who have achieved exceptional results in their work. The prize money is €5,000.

== Winners ==
year	name	function
1995	Thomas Roth	Foreign correspondent for ARD in Moscow
1996	Petra Gerster	Host of ZDF magazine ML mona lisa
	Maria von Welser	Host of ZDF magazine ML mona lisa
1997	Christoph Maria Fröhder	Crisis reporter for ARD
1998	Hans-Josef Dreckmann	Africa correspondent for ARD (studio Nairobi)
	Carla Kniestedt	
1999	Wolf von Lojewski	Host of ZDF news magazine heute journal
	Tina Hassel (Förderpreis)	ARD correspondent in France (ARD studio Paris)
2000	Gabi Bauer	Host of Tagesthemen on ARD
	Maybrit Illner	Host of ZDF talk show MAYBRIT ILLNER
	Sandra Maischberger	Host of talk show maischberger on n-tv
2001	Gerd Ruge	Lifetime achievement award
	Alexander Kluge	Lifetime achievement award
	Günter Gaus	Lifetime achievement award
2002	Dirk Sager	ZDF correspondent Russia (studio Moscow)
2003	Antonia Rados	Correspondent for RTL and n-tv, reporter from Bagdad
	Ulrich Tilgner	ZDF correspondent Bagdad
	Eric Friedler	Film Konvoi in den Tod
2004	Annette Dittert	ARD correspondent Poland (studio Warsawa)
2005	Frank Plasberg for Hart aber fair	Journalist and host, together with team for Hart aber fair (WDR)
	Horst Königstein	NDR, author and director (Die Manns, Speer und Er)
	Britta Hilpert	ZDF studio in Moscow
2006	ZDF program Frontal21	Claus Richter and host Theo Koll
2007	Anne Will	
2008	Eric Friedler	NDR television reporter and documentary producer (for example "The Silence of the Quandts")
	Christina Pohl	Spiegel TV reporter
2009	Nikolaus Brender	ZDF reporter
	Astrid Randerath and Christian Esser	Writers of ZDF television documentary Das Pharmakartell
2010	Claus Kleber	Host of ZDF news program heute journal
	Team of WDR documentary Die Story (special award)	Team with signification of Gert Monheim
2011	Johannes Hano	ZDF studio Peking
	Ariane Reimers	ARD correspondent in Peking
	Nasser Hadar (special award)	Libyan reporter
2012	Oliver Welke together with heute-show team	TV host for heute-show
	Denis Scheck	Literature journalist for Deutschlandfunk and host of ARD program Druckfrisch
2013	Jörg Armbruster	ARD correspondent in the Middle East
	Marcel Mettelsiefen	Photographer, camera, TV journalist, publisher and author
	Eva Müller	Reporter for WDR and author
2014	Golineh Atai	ARD correspondent in Arabia and Ukraine
	Stephan Lamby	TV author and producer
2015	Marietta Slomka	ZDF host
	Eliot Higgins and Bellingcat	Investigative team
2016	Hajo Seppelt	ARD sports journalist
	Armin Wolf	ORF journalist
2017	Hans-Ulrich Gack, Luc Walpot, Frederik Pleitgen	Middle East correspondents
	Isabel Schayani	WDR journalist
2018	Anja Reschke	ARD journalist
	Kulturzeit	3sat magazine
2019	Mai Thi Nguyen-Kim	Quarks, WDR, and YouTube Kanal maiLab
2019	Harald Lesch	ZDF
2020	Emily Maitlis	BBC journalist
2020	Ulf-Jensen Röller	ZDF correspondent
2021	Katrin Eigendorf	ZDF
2021	Carl Gierstorfer	Documentary film director
2022	Christoph Reuter	Reporter Der Spiegel
2022	OstWest	Private television station
2023	Ina Ruck	Correspondent for Westdeutscher Rundfunk Köln
2023	Elmar Theveßen	Head of ZDF's Washington, D.C. studio
2023	Sevgil Musaieva (special award)	Editor-in-Chief, Ukrainska Pravda
2023	Nataliya Gumenyuk (special award)	CEO, Public Interest Journalism Lab, and co-founder, Hromadske
2023	Olga Rudenko (special award)	Editor-in-Chief, The Kyiv Independent.
2024	Eva Schulz	Journalist
2024	Jan N. Lorenzen	Journalist
2025	Sophie von der Tann	Journalist, Correspondent for ARD in Tel Aviv
2025	Katharina Willinger	Journalist, Correspondent for ARD in Istanbul
2026	Dunja Hayali	Journalist, ZDF
2026	Sarah Tacke	Journalist, ZDF
