= Caren Miosga =

German journalist and television presenter (born 1969)

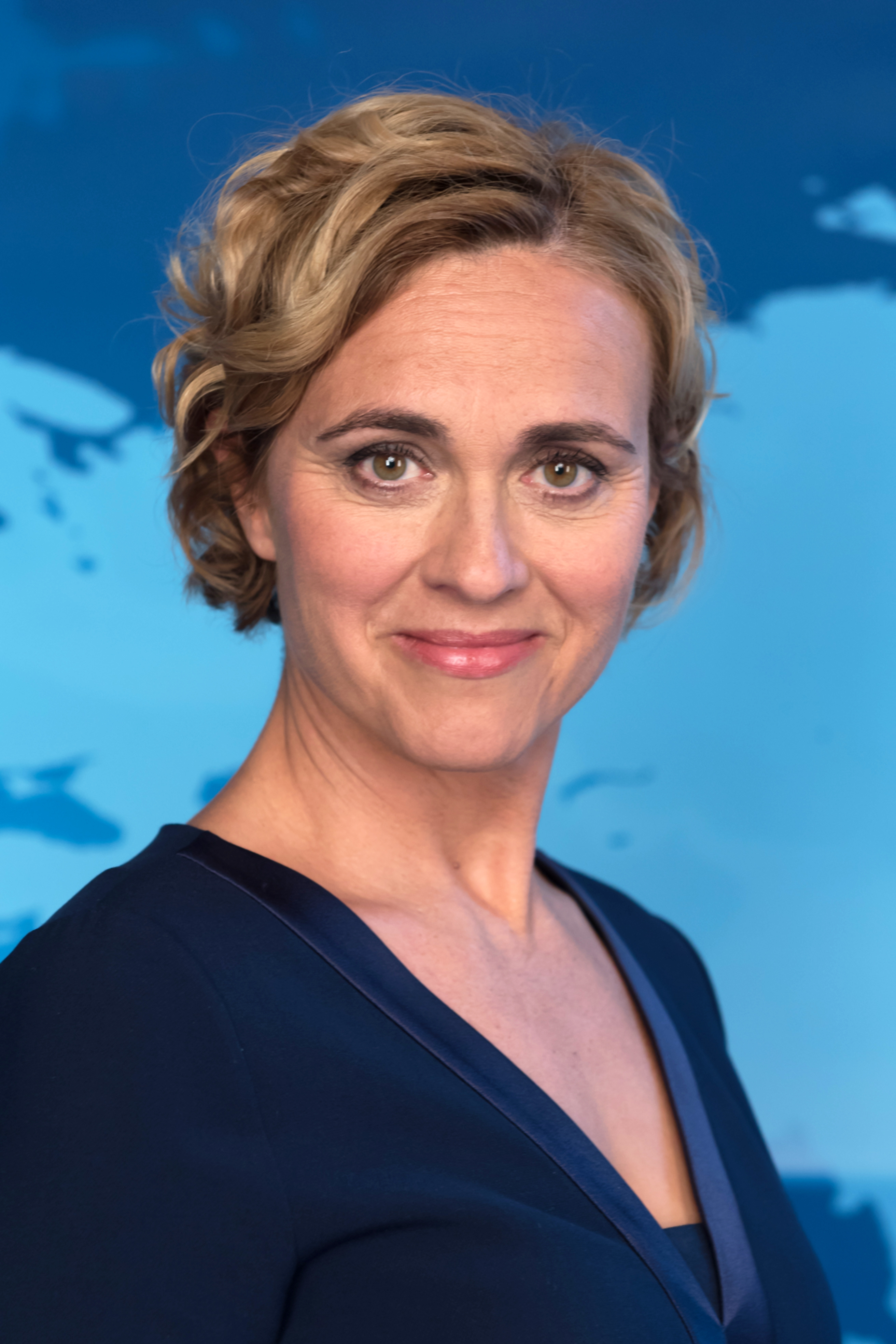
- Miosga in 2016
- Born: 11 April 1969 (age 57); Peine, Lower Saxony, West Germany
- Occupations: Journalist, television presenter

Caren Miosga (born 11 April 1969) is a German journalist and television presenter. She was a longtime presenter of the news television show Tagesthemen on ARD.

== Early life and education ==
Caren Miosga grew up in Groß Ilsede, Lower Saxony, and attended the local grammar school. She studied history and Slavic studies in Hamburg.

Miosga is fluent in Russian as she worked as a tour guide in Saint Petersburg and Moscow during her studies.

== Career ==
After completing her studies, Miosga worked for several radio stations – Radio Schleswig-Holstein (R.SH), Radio Hamburg and N-Joy – and the television channel RTL Television North. In 1999, she went to NDR Fernsehen and presented there the Kulturjournal. From May 2006, she hosted ttt Titel, Thesen, Temperamente, the ARD culture magazine.

The following year Miosga succeeded Anne Will and became the new presenter of Tagesthemen, appearing in rotation with successive co-presenters Tom Buhrow (2006–2013), Thomas Roth (2013–2016), and Ingo Zamperoni (2013–2014 and since 2016).

During her time at Tagesthemen, Miosga interviewed Prime Minister Manuel Valls of France on the occasion of his first official visit to Germany in 2014. In 2018, she and Deutsche Welle correspondent Max Hofmann jointly conducted a French-language TV interview with President Emmanuel Macron, his first with a German television channel.

In 2017, Miosga – representing the Tagesthemen editorial staff – was awarded a Goldene Kamera in the category "Best Information". In a 2018 survey conducted by Forsa Institute, she was voted one of Germany's most trusted news presenters.

On 5 October 2023, Miosga presented Tagesthemen for the last time. Since January 2024, she has been presenting her ARD political talk show Caren Miosga on most Sundays.

== Personal life ==
Miosga is married to pathologist Tobias Grob and has two children. The family of her father originates from Upper Silesia and has Russian roots.
