= Ingo Zamperoni =

German journalist and presenter

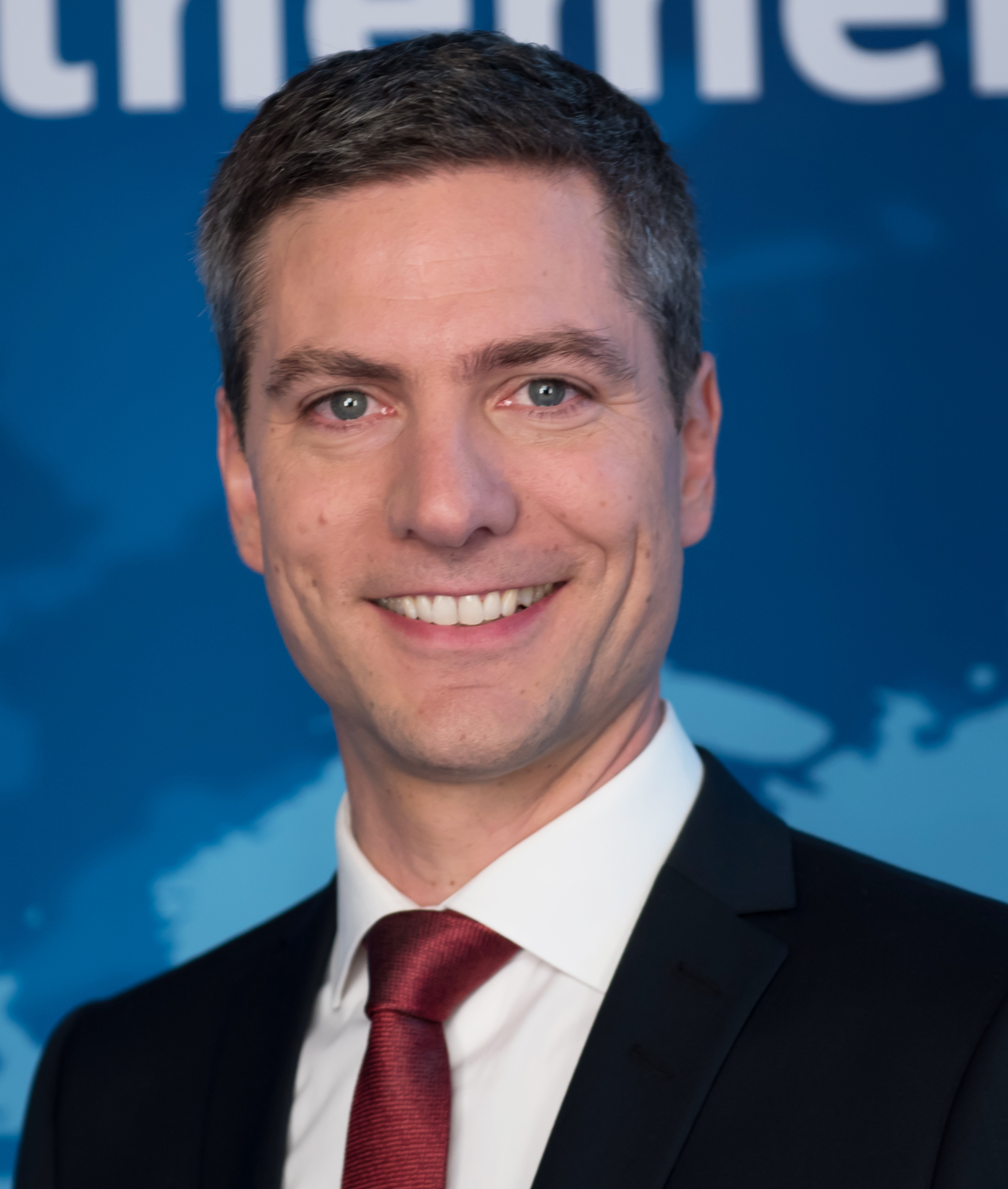
- Zamperoni in 2016
- Born: May 3, 1974 (age 51); Wiesbaden, West Germany
- Citizenship: German, Italian
- Occupations: News presenter, journalist
- Years active: 2002–present
- Employer: ARD

Ingo Antonio Zamperoni (born May 3, 1974, in Wiesbaden, West Germany) is a German news presenter and journalist. Between 2012 and 2014, he was the presenter of the Tagesthemen news magazine on the Das Erste channel, a role he continued in October 2016 upon returning from deployment as the ARD correspondent in Washington, D.C., between 2014 and 2016.

== Life and career ==
Born to an Italian father and German mother, Zamperoni was first introduced to presenting and journalism when he, after having obtained his Abitur, was in civilian service at the Radio Klinikfunk station in Wiesbaden. His parents had met in 1967 at Lake Maggiore. His father was a manager at Hoechst. Zamperoni has a brother four years younger, who is a practicing gynaecologist in Wiesbaden.

Between 1994 and 1999, Zamperoni studied American studies, law, and history at the University of Konstanz, and in Berlin and Boston.

After his studies, Zamperoni completed a traineeship at the NDR, after which he got a job in the NDR TV branch in Hamburg, for whom he worked as a subcontractor for the ARD and contributed to the Tagesschau and Tagesthemen broadcasts as a writer and reporter from 2002. He anchored the news show NDR Info, Niedersachsen 19.30 and as an anchor for the foreign magazine show Weltbilder (World Pictures).

On March 5, 2007, Zamperoni succeeded Anja Bröker as the moderator of the Nachtmagazin (Night Magazine) on the ARD flagship channel Das Erste, and until 2013, he – in constant rotation with the second host, Gabi Bauer – anchored the show.

In 2012, Zamperoni switched to the Tagesthemen team, replacing Susanne Holst as a substitute for Caren Miosga and Tom Buhrow. In addition to filling in for Miosga and Buhrow, he was scheduled to anchor Tagesthemen twelve weeks a year, and after Buhrow left the show, Zamperoni became a regular presenter.

In October 2013, it was announced on the ARD show Tagesschau Online that Zamperoni would move to Washington, D.C., on February 1, 2014, to become US correspondent for ARD.

Zamperoni returned to Germany from Washington, D.C., in October 2016, and on October 24, he became one of the main anchors of Tagesthemen, succeeding Thomas Roth, and in constant rotation with Caren Miosga and Pinar Atalay.

== Other activities ==
Since 2007, Zamperoni has been an ambassador for the children's aid organisation Save the Children, particularly focused on the educational programmes helping children in war zones. He is also an ambassador for the Bärenherz Foundation for seriously ill children.

In 2013, he was nominated as one of the top three contestants for the Newcomer of the Year prize presented by the German journalist trade magazine, Medium Magazin.

== Personal life ==
In 2006, Zamperoni married Jennifer Bourguignon, an American, with whom he has three children. He speaks German, Italian, and English and enjoys cycle sport in his free time.

Zamperoni has dual Italian and German citizenship.

== Bibliography ==
- Zamperoni, Ingo (2016). Fremdes Land Amerika: Warum wir unser Verhältnis zu den USA neu bewerten müssen (in German). Berlin: Ullstein Verlag. ISBN 978-3-550-08142-2.
- Zamperoni, Ingo (2018). Anderland – Die USA unter Trump, ein Schadensbericht (in German). Berlin: Ullstein Verlag. ISBN 978-3-550-05050-3.
