= Claus Richter =

German journalist (born 1948)

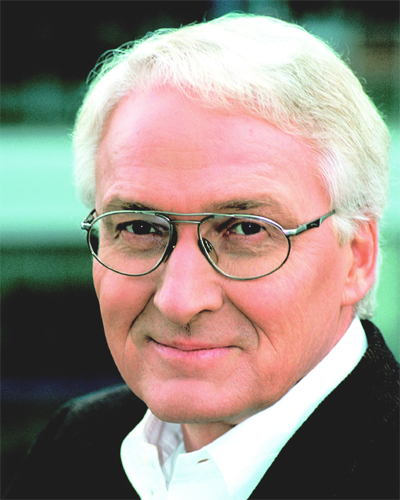
Claus Richter

Claus Richter (born 4 November 1948 in Straubing) is a German journalist.

== Life ==
Richter works in Germany as a journalist. From 1984 to 1987 he was correspondent and studio manager for the ARD in New York City, likewise from 1987 to 1991 in East Berlin. Since 2001 Richter has been a television presenter for magazine show Frontal 21 on ZDF.

== Awards ==
- 1990: Bayerischer Fernsehpreis
- 2005: Deutscher Fernsehpreis for "Fall Deutschland"
- 2005: Deutscher Wirtschaftsfilmpreis
- 2006: Hanns Joachim Friedrichs Award for Frontal 21
- 2007: Goldene Kamera for Frontal21

== Filmography ==
- 1993 – Götter, Gurus und Ganoven – aus der Goldstadt Bombay
- 1994 – Wir müssen den Krieg vergessen
- 1994 – Krieg im Paradies
- 1995 – Im Zeichen des Totenkopfs – Piraten in Fernost
- 1995 – Lockende Südsee – Im Banne des großen Feuers / Von Göttern und Götzen in Polynesien
- 1997 – Tatort Hongkong-Schmuggelboom vor dem Machtwechsel
- 1998 – Männer, die in die Kälte gingen
- 1998 – Im Rausch des schwarzen Goldes
- 1999 – Die neue Seidenstraße
- 1999 – Zum Sterben ins Kosovo
- 2000 – Abenteuer Amazonas
- 2005 – documentation "Fall Deutschland" (together with Stefan Aust)
- 2006/2007 – documentation "Globalisierung – Wettlauf um die Welt" (together with Stefan Aust)
- 2009 – documentation "Wettlauf um die Welt – Aufbruch aus der Krise"' (together with Stefan Aust)
- 2009 – documentation "Kandidat Steinmeier" (together with Ulf-Jensen Röller)
- 2009 – documentation "Auferstanden aus Ruinen – Von der SED zur Linkspartei" (together with Stefan Aust)
- 2010 – documentation Doppelportrait Wulff-Gauck (together with Ulf-Jensen Röller)
