= Elmar Theveßen =

German journalist and author

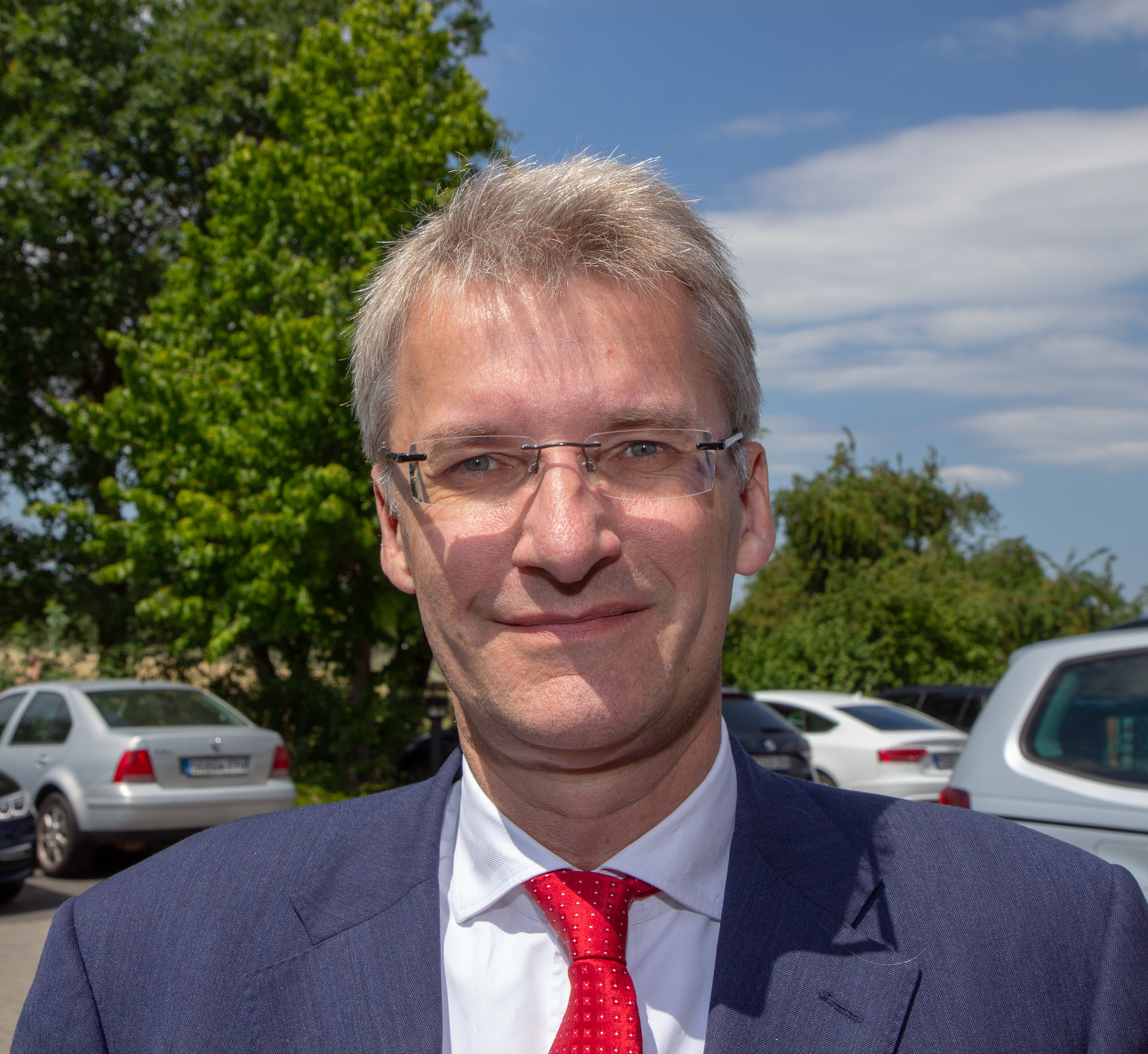
- Theveßen in 2018
- Born: 3 June 1967 (age 59); Viersen, North Rhine-Westphalia, West Germany
- Education: University of Bonn, American University
- Occupations: Journalist; Author
- Awards: See Awards

Elmar Theveßen (German pronunciation: [ˈɛlmaʁ ˈteːvəsn̩]; born 3 June 1967) is a German journalist and author.

== Education and career ==
Theveßen studied history, political science and Germanistics at the University of Bonn between 1987 and 1993, also working freelance for a local newspaper and public broadcaster. From 1990 to 1991, he studied foreign policy and journalism at the American University in Washington, D.C., during which time he freelanced for Channel 5 Fox and Rufa, part of Deutsche Presse-Agentur.

=== ZDF ===
In 1991, Theveßen joined ZDF, initially as a freelancer for their Bonn branch, serving as head editor of Bonn direkt, a television program focused on domestic education politics. From 1995 to 2001, he was an international correspondent for the Washington branch. Upon his return to Germany, Theveßen was a reporter for the main office in Berlin, attached to the news magazine Frontal21. In 2003, he became the managing editor of ZDF's current affairs department. Between June 2007 and February 2019, Theveßen was deputy editor-in-chief and acting head of the current affairs department. Since 2019, he has been the director of ZDF's Washington studio.

Theveßen is also a writer on terrorism, particularly Islamic terrorism and its online radicalization channels.

== Reception ==
Theveßen has been criticized byother journalists for the inflammatory language he has applied to Donald Trump, calling him a "fascist", a "malignant narcissist", and an "autocrat who wants to destroy American democracy with a wrecking ball", as well as comparing him to Adolf Hitler and Benito Mussolini.

Theveßen drew criticism for denying any concerns about the health of Joe Biden in the lead up to the 2024 United States presidential election. He repeatedly stated that Biden was "mentally in top shape" in the weeks before Bidens withdrawal for the election due to health concerns. In January 2026, he published a documentary, Donald Trump – König im Weißen Haus (Donald Trump – King in the White House), in which other critics of Trump allege deterioration of freedom of the press under his second administration.

Following the assassination of American right-wing activist Charlie Kirk, Theveßen falsely stated during an interview on Markus Lanz on 11 September 2025 that Kirk had called for the stoning of homosexuals, when Kirk had only made mention of Leviticus 20:13, which mentioned capital punishment for homosexuality, though not stoning, during a debate regarding Christopher Street Day celebrations. Special Envoy and former US Ambassador to Germany Richard Grenell subsequently called Theveßen "a radical left-winger" and urged the US government to revoke Theveßen's visa, though ZDF noted that his statements were protected under free speech. On 1 October, Theveßen acknowledged his error a few days later and issued an apology, also praising the widow Erika Kirk, calling her "humble" for publicly forgiving her husband's killer.

Theveßen's writings on Islamic terrorism have been criticized as having the sole focus of attacks and recruitment in Europe, for not addressing the stated ideology of such groups and errors with quoted Islamic texts. Al-Qaeda researcher Yassin Musharbash wrote that Theveßen has a tendency to equate devout belief to militancy, though Theveßen emphasized the importance of not conflating mainstream Islam with Islamic fundamentalism since this is in accordance with the goals of Islamists.

== Literature ==
- 2002: Schläfer mitten unter uns. (Sleepers in our midst) Droemer, München 2002; aktualisierte Taschenbuchausgabe: Knaur, Munich 2004, ISBN 3-426-77730-4.
- 2004: Die Bush-Bilanz. Wie der US-Präsident sein Land und die Welt betrogen hat. (The Bush record. How the US President betrayed his country and the world.) Droemer, München 2004, ISBN 3-426-27327-6.
- 2005: Terroralarm. Deutschland und die islamistische Bedrohung. (Terror alert. Germany and the Islamist threat) Rowohlt Berlin, Berlin 2005, ISBN 3-87134-548-2.
- 2009: Al-Qaida. Wissen was stimmt. (Al-Qaida. Knowing what's right) Herder, Freiburg im Breisgau 2009, ISBN 978-3-451-06107-3.
- 2011: Nine-Eleven. Der Tag, der die Welt veränderte. Propyläen, Berlin 2011, ISBN 978-3-549-07381-0.
- 2016: Terror in Deutschland. Die tödliche Strategie der Islamisten. (Terror in Germany. The deadly strategy of the Islamists) Piper, München 2016, ISBN 978-3-492-05803-2.
- 2020 Die Zerstörung Amerikas: Wie Donald Trump sein Land und die Welt für immer verändert. (The Destruction of America: How Donald Trump changed his country and the world forever.) Piper, München 2020, ISBN 978-3-492-07058-4.

== Awards ==
- 1994: Medienpreis from the German Bundestag
- 1996: nominination for Telestar
- 1998, 2002, 2003: Radio, TV, and New Media Award from the RIAS Commission
- 2011: Bul le Mérite from the Federation of German Detectives
- 2012: Deutscher Fernsehpreis for the documentary 9/11
- 2023: Hanns-Joachim-Friedrichs-Preis
