= Jörg Schieb =

German journalist and author

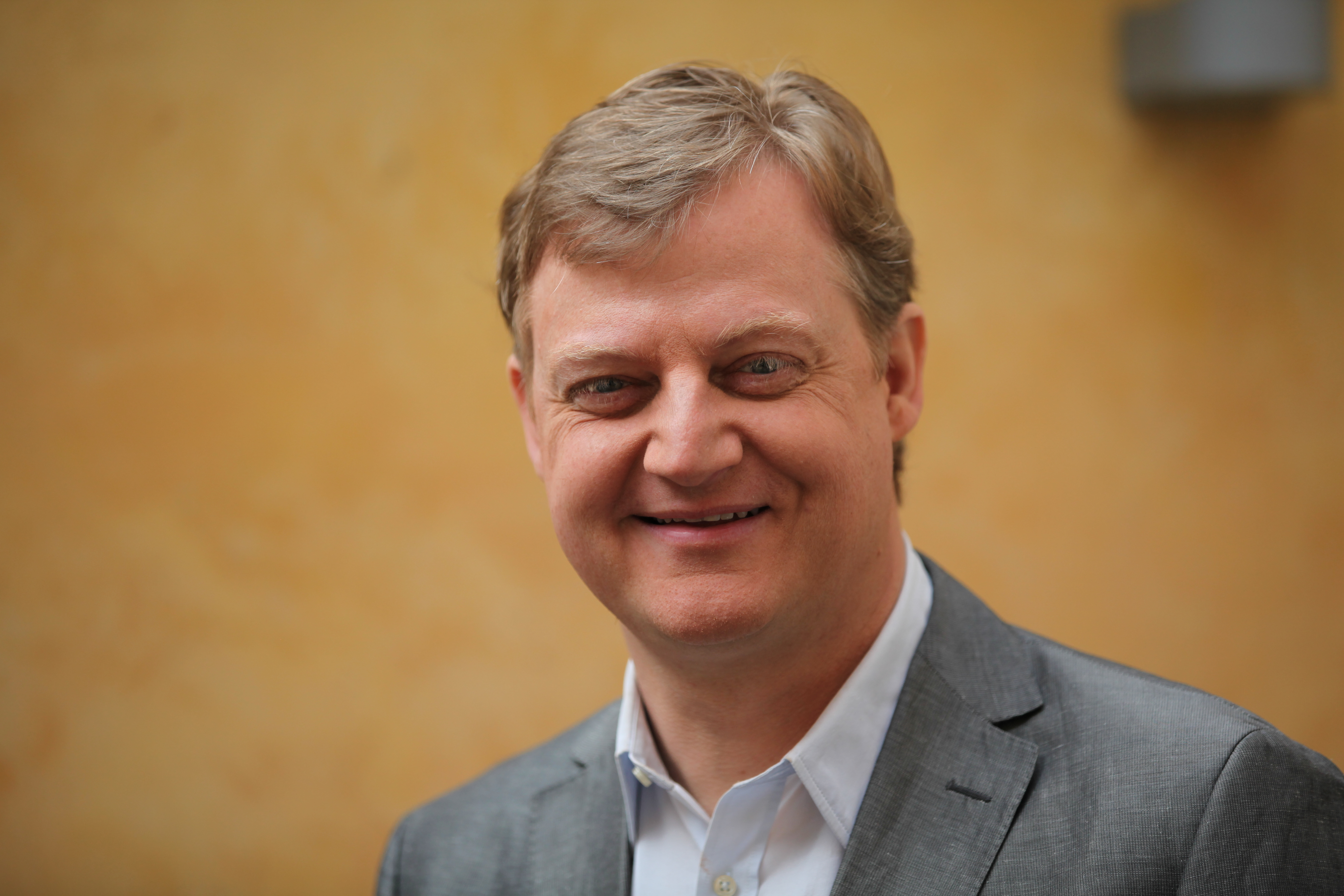
- Born: November 25, 1964 (age 61); Osnabrück, Germany
- Writing career
- Language: German
- Genres: Journalist, blogger

Jörg Schieb (born 25 November 1964 in Osnabrück) is a German journalist and author of reference books for programming and application software.

== Career ==
Since the 1980s, when home computers and PCs got common, he writes books and posts about this topic for computer magazines. Schieb regularly appears in the German TV channel WDR Fernsehen, e.g. in the Aktuelle Stunde news broadcast. However, he also informs about IT topics in other broadcasts, like Tagesschau, Tagesthemen, Nachtmagazin and Tagesschau24. Schieb blogs for the WDR, and from 2011 to 2014, he contributed to the ARD Ratgeber: Internet broadcast, which is no longer on air.
