= Carl Gierstorfer =

German journalist and filmmaker (born 1975)

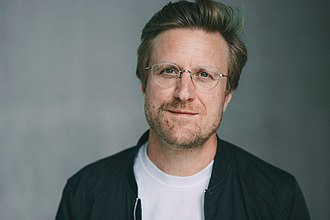
Carl Borromäus Gierstorfer (2021)

Carl Borromäus Gierstorfer (born 1975 in Mallersdorf-Pfaffenberg) is a German journalist and documentary filmmaker.

== Life ==
Carl Gierstorfer grew up in Viechtach in the Bavarian Forest, where he graduated from high school in 1995. After a traineeship and accompanying training at Deutsche Journalistenschule, he studied biology at University College London. He dedicated his thesis to analyzing genetic signatures that had found their way into the Central Asian gene pool after the campaigns of Alexander the Great. As a journalist and documentary filmmaker, he finds his topics and subjects at the cross-section of history, science and society.

== Works ==
From 2011 onwards, he accompanied a team of scientists searching for the origins of HIV in the Democratic Republic of the Congo and Cameroon. His 2014 documentary "The Bloody Truth" presents a historical context for the origin of HIV. Based on the analysis of HIV-positive tissue samples, the origin of the most-common form of HIV (HIV-1 group M) has been dated to the decades between 1880 and 1920. The film explores the hypothesis that the colonial development of Central Africa created the structures and networks that allowed the virus to spread.

In 2014, Carl Gierstorfer and journalist Laura Salm-Reifferscheidt spent three months in Liberia documenting the Ebola epidemic. The 2017 Grimme Award-winning documentary film "We Want You To Live" tells the story of Stanley Juah, who was rejected by his village and was threatened with death for bringing the virus into his community. Parallel to the film, a web format was created - "Mawah - When Ebola came to our village", which won the "Lovie Award" in 2016.

In "Dollar Heroes – North Korea's Secret Slaves" (2018), Carl Gierstorfer, investigative journalist Sebastian Weis and producer Tristan Chytroscheck filmed undercover to document how North Korea maintains a worldwide network of forced laborers to earn foreign currency for the regime. The documentary was broadcast by 17 television stations worldwide and was shown in the European Parliament.

Between 2014 and 2019, Carl Gierstorfer regularly travelled to the Peruvian Amazon to document the fate of the Mashco-Piro, one of the last isolated peoples on earth. After the Mashco Piro had repeatedly made contact with the outside world and h a d been involved in deadly conflicts with indigenous communities, the Peruvian Ministry of Culture decided to intervene. "The River Between Us" premiered at DocsMX in Mexico City in October 2021. The feature-length documentary deals with the question of the extent to which isolated peoples and modern societies can coexist.

Between Christmas 2020 and March 2021, Carl Gierstorfer spent three months in a Corona ICU at Berlin's Charité clinic. The 4-part documentary series "Charité Intensiv: Station 43", which he realized with co-author Mareike Müller, is one of the most successful documentary series on German television with more than 2.6 million views. It was awarded the German Television Prize 2021 and the Grimme Award 2022 amongst others. Carl Gierstorfer received the Hanns Joachim Friedrichs Prize 2021 for this work. The jury recognized the "extremely respectful, strictly observational style", which paints "an authentic picture of the pandemic and its consequences to the limits of endurance" for the viewer

After the Russian attack on Ukraine in February 2022, Gierstorfer accompanied the Ukrainian pediatrician Wira Primakova for several months. The 60-minute documentary "Wira's War" was awarded the Grimme Award in 2024. The jury praised "the filmmaker's outstanding visual approach - a camera that balances proximity and distance at all levels of what is shown."

In 2023, ARD released the second season of Charité Intensiv. In four parts, the series investigates Germany's shortage of organ donors.

== Filmography (selection) ==
- 2010: The End of Red October (Discovery Channel)
- 2012: Myanmar: Die Freiheit leben (arte)
- 2014: The Bloody Truth (ZDF / arte / PBS / Smithsonian)
- 2016: We Want You To Live (SWR / arte / PBS / Al Jazeera)
- 2018: Dollar Heros - North Korea's Secret Slaves (ZDF / arte / BBC / a. o.)
- 2019: Peru: The Price of
- 2020: Office 39: Kimʹs Cash Machine (ZDF / Al Jazeera)
- 2021: The River Between Us (SWR/arte, Hessenfilm, Pulitzer Center on Crisis Reporting, First Hand Fund)
- 2021: Charité Intensiv: Station 43 (rbb for ARD media library)
- 2023: Wira's War (DOCDAYS Productions for rbb/ARTE)
- 2023: Charité Intensiv: Gegen die Zeit (rbb for ARD Mediathek)

== Awards and honours ==
- 2011: Silver Dolphin Cannes Corporate Media & TV Awards for "Leben mit der Flut" (DW-TV)
- 2015: Eine Welt Filmpreis des Landes Nordrhein-Westfalen for "AIDS - Erbe der Kolonialzeit"
- 2016: Lovie Award for "Mawah - when Ebola Came to Our Village"
- 2016: Finalist "Best Editing" Jackson Hole Science Award "AIDS - Legacy of the Colonial Era"
- 2017: Grimme Award for "We Want You To Live"
- 2017: Nomination Prix Europa Best European Journalist of the Year
- 2019: Golden Nymph for best international documentary at the Monte Carlo TV Festival for "Dollar Heroes"
- 2019: Grierson Award nomination, Best Documentary Series for "Why Slavery / Dollar Heroes"
- 2021: Hanns Joachim Friedrichs Award for Television Journalism
- 2021: German Television Award Best Documentary Series for "Charité Intensiv - Station 43"
- 2021: Main Award of the Catholic Media Award, Television category for "Charité Intensiv - Station 43"
- 2021: Media Award of the German Sepsis Society for "Charité Intensive Care - Ward 43"
- 2021: Film and Television Award of the German Hartmannbund for "Charité Intensiv - Station 43"
- 2021: German Academy of Television Award in the documentary film category for "Charité Intensiv - Station 43"
- 2022: Blue Panther in the Information and Journalism category for "Charité Intensiv - Station 43"
- 2022: Grimme Award for "Charité Intensiv: Station 43"
- 2024: Grimme Award for "Wira's War"

== Publications ==
- Learning from Ebola - Don't hide, protect!
- Aids pandemic - In the maelstrom of the colonial era
- "Amazônia" by Salgado: "Everything came to me from the light"

== Publications about Carl Gierstorfer ==
- Filming in the intensive care unit - "I cried too"
- Faith on ward 43: Interview with Carl Gierstorfer
- Episode 39: Charité intensive
- Documentary filmmaker Carl Gierstorfer - On the trail of Ebola
