= Aline Abboud =

German journalist

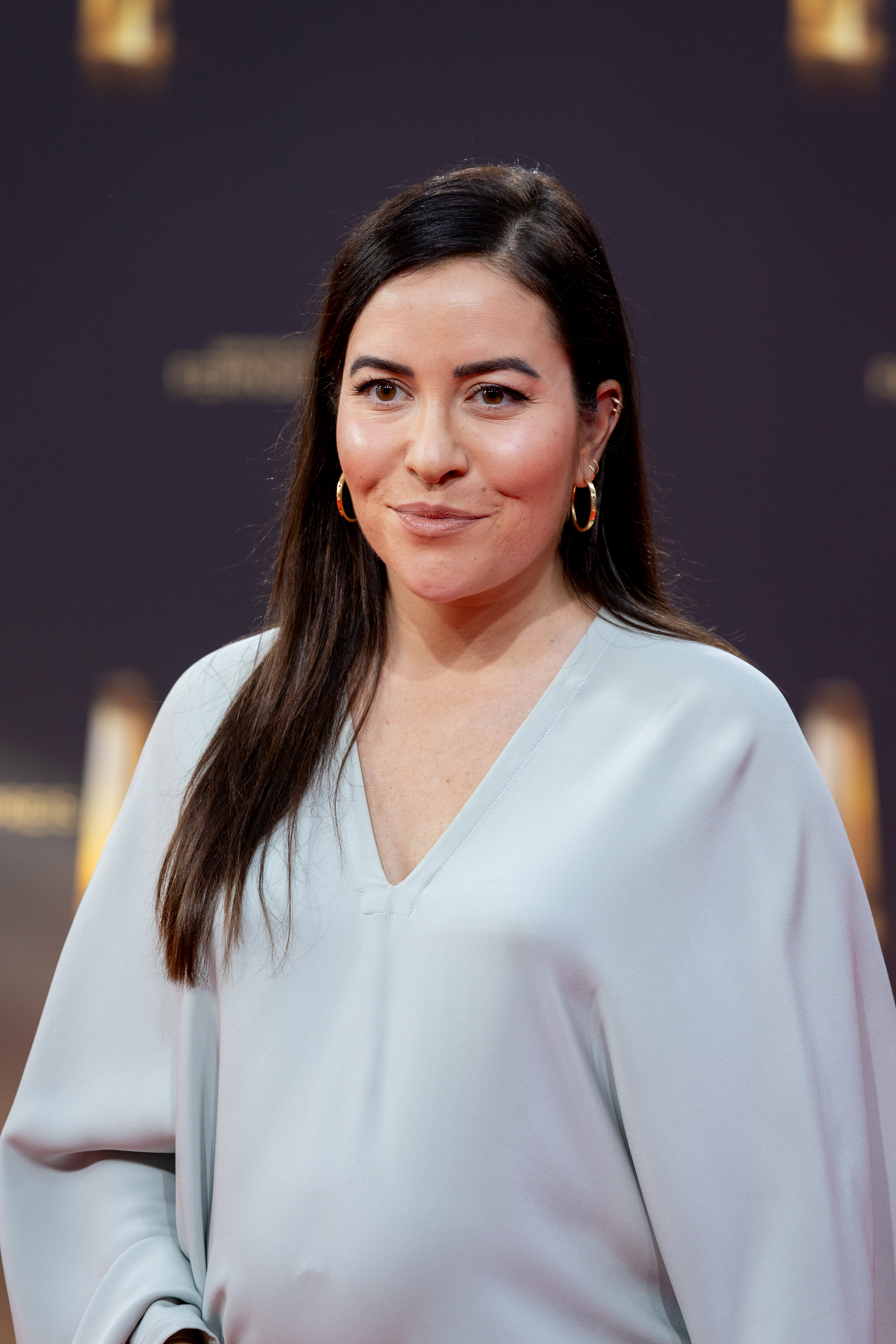
- Abboud in 2023
- Born: 23 January 1988 (age 38); East Berlin, East Germany
- Education: Leipzig University
- Employer: ARD
- Known for: Presenting Tagesthemen

Aline Abboud (born 23 January 1988) is a German journalist and television presenter. Having studied Arab studies at Leipzig University, she worked for the German public broadcaster ZDF as an editor and reporter with a focus on foreign affairs. Since September 2021, Abboud presents Tagesthemen, a daily news magazine broadcast by ARD. She is the first woman born in the German Democratic Republic to hold this position.

== Early life and education ==
Aline Abboud was born in 1988 in East Berlin, then part of the German Democratic Republic, to a Lebanese-German family. She read Arab studies at Leipzig University with stints in Beirut and Istanbul. Speaking to Leipziger Volkszeitung in 2021, Abboud said that she had always wished to become a journalist to cover the Middle East, and that she had chosen her field of study with this wish in mind. After her studies, she volunteered at the Bundestag, Germany's federal parliament.

== Career ==
In 2016 Abboud became an editor at heute, a news programme broadcast by ZDF, one of Germany's two public broadcasters. She also presented heuteXpress on the same channel. From 2018, she contributed to auslandsjournal, a ZDF format on foreign affairs, as a reporter. Since 2019, she presents "DIE DA OBEN!" for the streaming service Funk. Abboud has acted as a producer on a documentary (Und jetzt Wir) about youth protests for Arte. She serves on the advisory board of the Candid Foundation, a nonprofit organisation focussing on the Southern Mediterranean and Western Asia.

In 2021 Abboud joined the public broadcaster ARD to succeed Pinar Atalay on Tagesthemen, the channel's flagship daily news magazine. She is the first woman born in the German Democratic Republic to be appointed to this position. On 4 September 2021, she made her debut appearance on the programme.

== Private life ==
Abboud has one child, a daughter, that was born in April 2024. She lives with her family in Berlin.
