= Johannes Hano =

German journalist (born 1963)

Johannes Hano (born 1963) is a German journalist who has won the RIAS Television Award, the Hanns Joachim Friedrichs Award, and the Bavarian TV Awards for his documentaries and work.

== Biography ==
Hano graduated from school having studied political science and administrative law in Frankfurt. He continued in several internships, and eventually, a job as a freelance journalist from 1994 to 2002. Afterwards, he went to work at the Landesstudio Hamburg from 1994 to 1998. He worked as a planning editor and reporter for the ZDF morning magazine until 1999. While working at the ZDF he focused on domestic policy and the Kosovo War. Following this, he would go on to report for the Hauptstadtstudio Berlin until 2001. Then, he became a correspondent from the Bundestag. From 2001 to 2006 he worked as a reporter for the magazine Frontal. Johannes would go on to become the head of the ZDF studio in Beijing and the person responsible for managing ZDF reporting in Japan from January 2007 to August 2014. Hano took over the management of the ZDF correspondent's office in New York City on 1 September 2014.

== Awards ==
In 2003 he won the RIAS Television Award for the documentary The Day That Changed the World, and in 2011 the Hanns Joachim Friedrichs Award for Television Journalism. Later, in 2011 he was awarded the Bavarian TV Awards for his TV documentary on China's Borders. The jury for the award stated: "In his travel report 'China's Borders', Johannes Hano takes a look at the Middle Kingdom from the periphery. On almost 20,000 km he has circumnavigated the giant empire and we get to know a multi-ethnic state that is much more multifaceted than any Western cliché suggests, and which is probably also much harder to control than the centralist state power would have us believe. Hano always shows us a China that hardly anyone in the West knows. The Bavarian Television Award 2011 goes to Johannes Hano for his report 'China's Borders', which offers a unique view of a country that will change the future of the world and of which we know so little."

== Filmography ==
- Hahnhöfer Sand Youth Prison, together with Jörg Rosizke (ARTE, 1997)
- Der Tag der die Welt veränderte, together with Elmar Thevessen (ZDF, 2002), RIAS Television Award for the documentary.
- The Big Lie – Bush, Blair and Saddam's Bomb, together with Thomas Reichart (ZDF, 2003)
- Out of Control – The Security Chaos at Frankfurt Airport, together with Jörg Brase and Thomas Reichart (ZDF, 2004)
- The power of the Games – Beijing one year before the Olympics, together with Diana Zimmermann (ZDF, 2007)
- Um jeden Preis (ZDF, 2008)
- Einsatz in der Hölle (Phoenix, 2009)
- Attack on Paradise (ZDF, 2009)
- China's Borders 1 – Tiger, Smuggler, Fortress Island,
- China's Borders 2 – Deserts, Passes,
- Wild Riders (ZDF, 2010), Bavarian Television Award
- The Fukushima Lie, 1 Year After (ZDF, 2012)
- The Fukushima Lie – Three Years After the Catastrophe (ZDF, 2014)
- USA-The Bought Democracy? (ZDF, 2016)
- Arctic Blue 1 Power Poker in melting ice, Arctic Blue 2 – Who owns the North? (ZDF, 2022)
- Putin*s helper (ZDF, 2025)

To gather the material necessary for the ZDF documentary on China's borders, Johannes Hano travelled for six months through China's border provinces. Hano traveled 20,000 kilometers on country roads, dirt roads and sandy slopes. He visited China's borders with Russia and North Korea and headed for Taiwan in the southwest to Yunnan. He has recorded his personal experiences in a travel diary.

== Publication ==
- Hano, Johannes (2011). Das japanische Desaster Fukushima und die Folgen (in German). Freiburg, Br. ISBN 978-3-451-30544-3. OCLC 734086983. Wenn der Erdbebenfisch tief unten mit seiner Flosse schlägt. In: FAZ. 16 August 2011, p. 30.
