= Caren Miosga (talk show) =

German political talk show

- Genre: Talk show
- Presented by: Caren Miosga
- Country of origin: Germany
- Original language: German

Production
- Producer: Marcus Foag
- Running time: 60 minutes
- Production company: MIO Media GmbH

Original release
- Network: Das Erste
- Release: 21 January 2024 – present

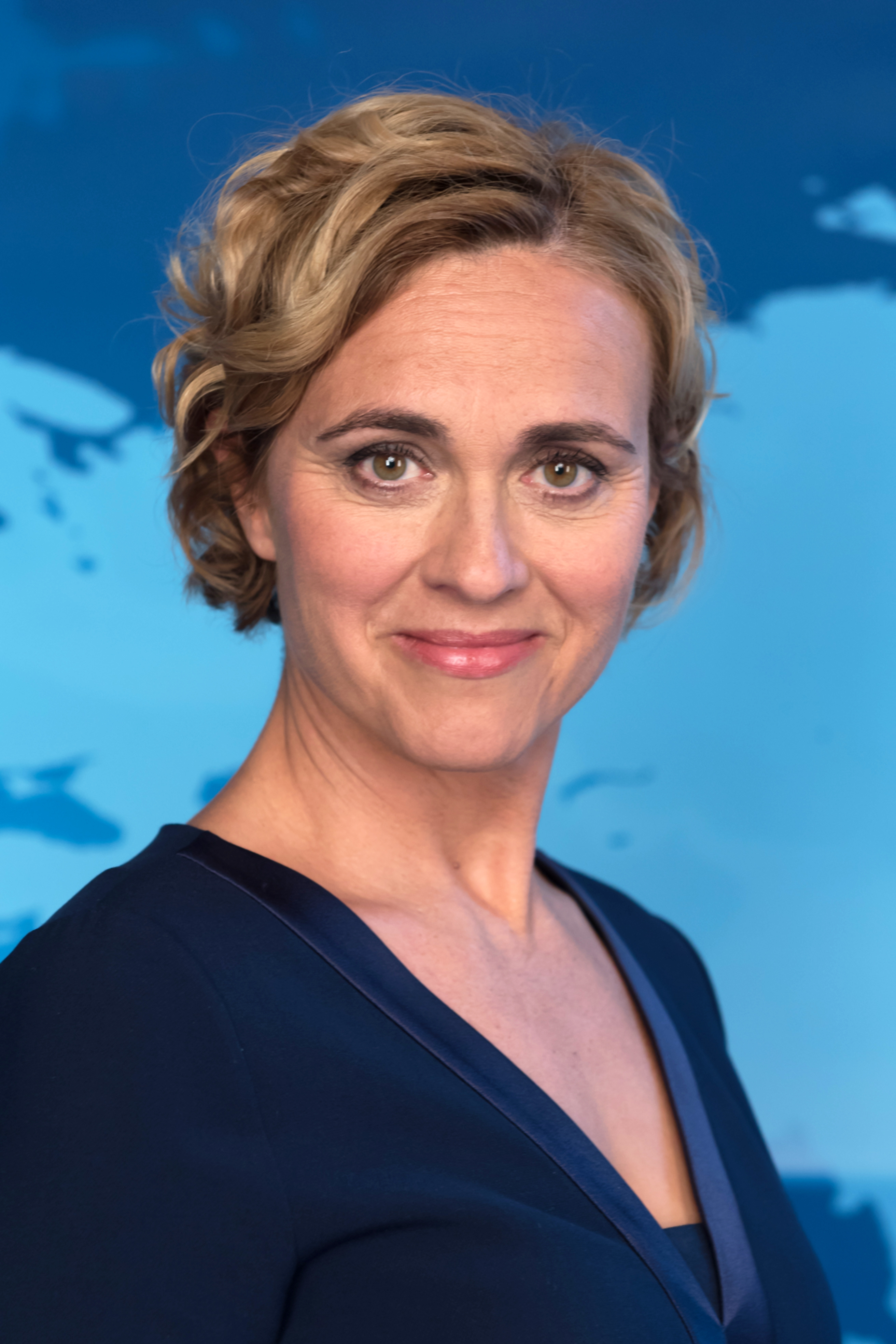
Presenter Caren Miosga

Caren Miosga is a weekly German political talk show broadcast on Das Erste. It is named after the moderator Caren Miosga, who is well known for her previous role as a news anchor of Tagesthemen.

== History ==
The show Caren Miosga premiered in early 2024, replacing the long-running talk show Anne Will. The change followed Anne Will's decision not to renew her contract, which expired at the end of 2023. Caren Miosga, who had been the main anchor of Tagesthemen for 16 years, was selected to lead the new program.

Prominent political figures such as Volodymyr Zelenskyy, Friedrich Merz, Christian Lindner and Annalena Baerbock have appeared on the show.

== Production ==
The talk show is produced live every Sunday evening from the Berlin Adlershof studio. Production is handled by Miosga's own production company, in collaboration with Norddeutscher Rundfunk. For its inaugural year, 30 episodes have been scheduled.
