= Frank Plasberg =

German journalist and television presenter

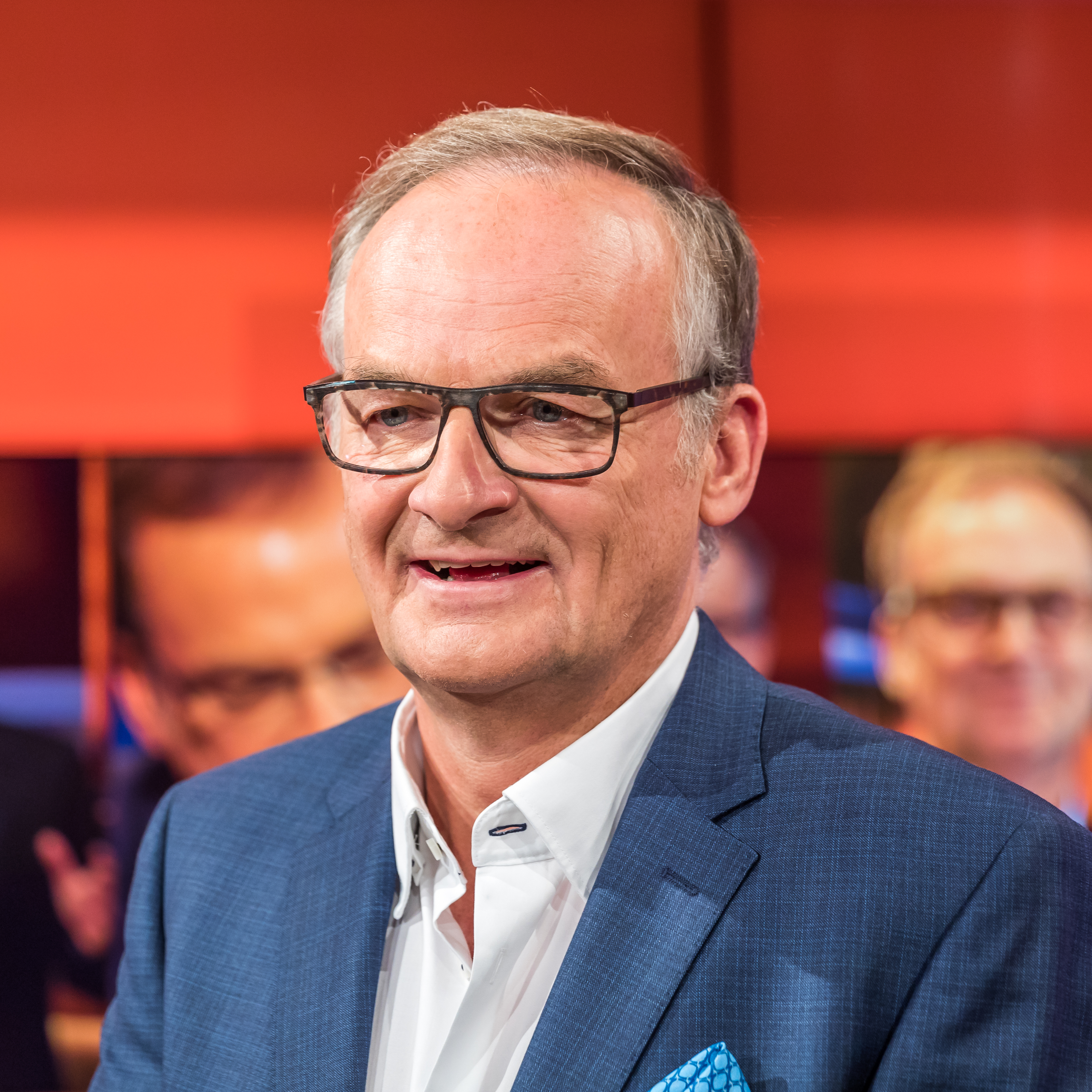
- Plasberg in 2022
- Born: 18 May 1957 (age 69); Remscheid, West Germany
- Occupations: Journalist, television presenter
- Spouses: Angela Maas (divorced) Anne Gesthuysen (m. 2012)
- Children: 3

Frank Plasberg (born 18 May 1957) is a German journalist and television presenter.

== Biography ==
Born in Remscheid, Plasberg has an education in theatre, politics and pedagogy and works as television presenter on German broadcaster WDR. From 1987 to 2002, he was television host of programme Aktuelle Stunde (together with journalist Christine Westermann). From 2001 to 2023, Plasberg was television host of Hart aber fair ("hard but fair") on WDR, and nationwide on ARD since 2007. He is known for his controversial role in the Gladbeck hostage crisis .

Plasberg was married with Angela Maas (born 1959); they have one son and one daughter. Since July 2007, he lives together with Anne Gesthuysen (born 1969). They married in August 2012. Her son was born in January 2011.

== Awards ==
- 2003: Deutscher Fernsehpreis
- 2005: Adolf-Grimme-Preis
- 2005: Ernst Schneider Award
- 2005: Hanns Joachim Friedrichs Award
- 2006: Bayerischer Fernsehpreis in information for moderation of Hart aber fair
- 2006: journalist of year in politics
- 2008: Bambi in Category 'Moderation'
