= Max Hofmann =

German broadcast journalist (born 1974)

- Born: Maximilian Hofmann; 1974 (age 51–52); Tübingen, West Germany
- Citizenship: German
- Education: CELSA, Paris-Sorbonne, France; Free University of Berlin, Germany
- Occupations: Head of News & Current Affairs Deutsche Welle
- Years active: 1999–present

Maximilian Hofmann (born 1974) is a German broadcast journalist who has been Head of News & Current Affairs department at the German broadcaster Deutsche Welle since 2020.

== Early life ==
Hofmann was born in 1974 in Tübingen, West Germany, and grew up in Schwäbisch Hall. His father is German, his mother was American, and in his early life he spent summers with his cousins in Indiana.

== Education ==
From 2002 to 2003, Hofmann volunteered at Deutsche Welle (DW), Germany.

From 1998 to 2002, he attended the Free University of Berlin, Germany, and received a Master of Arts in Communication and Journalism, and North American Studies.

From 1996 to 1998, he attended CELSA, Paris-Sorbonne, Île-de-France, and received a Bachelor of Arts in Communication and Journalism.

In 1994, he graduated from Gymnasium bei St. Michael Schwäbisch Hall, Schwäbisch Hall, Germany.

== Career ==
Since 2005, Hofmann has been employed by the German international broadcaster Deutsche Welle (DW). Hofmann covered the European Union (EU), NATO, the Benelux countries, and France as DW's European Correspondent and Brussels Bureau Chief from August 1, 2014, to January 1, 2020. President Emmanuel Macron gave his first interview to a German television network on May 9, 2018, in a French-language TV interview moderated by Caren Miosga of Tagesthemen.

Hofmann worked in the DW Studio in Washington, D.C., as a Senior Correspondent for North America from 2010 to 2014. From 2005 to 2010, he worked as the Personal Editor for the Managing TV Director of DW in Germany. From 2008 to 2010, he also worked as the Moderator for the DW Clipmania and Deutsche Beats shows.

He worked on many special projects while serving as the personal editor for the managing TV director of DW in Germany from 2005 until 2010. He also served as the moderator for the DW Clipmania and Deutsche Beats shows from 2008 to 2010. He served as a news anchor for DW's news show from 2005 until 2007. Hofmann served as a radio and television reporter for Rundfunk Berlin-Brandenburg (rbb) in Germany from 2003 until 2005. He served as an anchor for the German rbb station Radioeins from 2000 until 2002. Hofmann served as an anchor for the German rock station Star FM Radio from 1999 to 2000.

== Awards ==
For their documentary Eingemauert or Walled In, Max Hofmann and Christoph Lanz won the RIAS Berlin Commission New Media Award on May 30, 2010. This production examines the characteristics of the inner German border and was initially released as a streaming movie on the DW website. An instructional piece commemorating the 20th anniversary of the Berlin Wall's fall, the animated recreation of it was released.
