= Annette Dittert =

German author and filmmaker

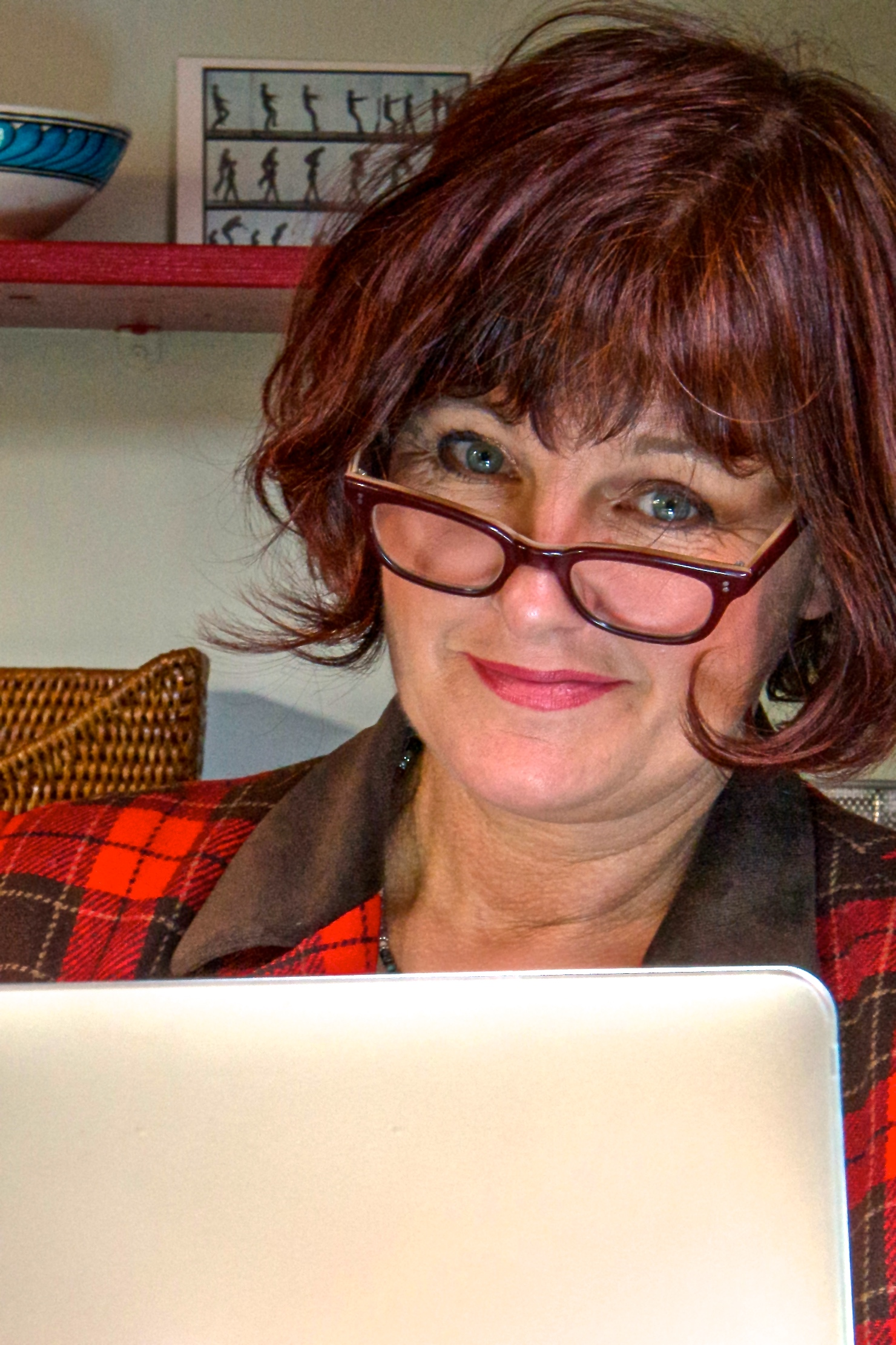
Annette Dittert

Annette Dittert is a German-British author, filmmaker, correspondent, and journalist.

== Life ==
Dittert was born in Cologne, Germany, where she grew up. She studied Political Science, Philosophy and German at the University of Freiburg and at the Free University of Berlin. From 1983 to 1985 Dittert worked as a journalist for the German newspaper Westdeutsche Allgemeine Zeitung. Since 1984 she was a reporter for a German radio network Sender Freies Berlin and later became an editor at the German television station Westdeutscher Rundfunk. From 1995 to 2001 Dittert was the head of ARD's breakfast show ARD-Morgenmagazin that she also presented.

From July 2001 to July 2005 Dittert was the ARD-correspondent in Warsaw, Poland. From 2005 to 2006 she travelled through China, India and Africa for a four-part documentary Abenteuer Glück, that received a Adolf-Grimme-Preis and a nomination for International Emmy Award by International Academy of Television Arts & Sciences in 2006. From 2006 to 2008 Dittert was the bureau chief and senior correspondent for ARD German TV in New York and since 2008 she works in London, equally as senior correspondent and bureau chief for ARD German TV. In 2019 she was awarded "political journalist of the year" for her reporting on Brexit.

== Works by Dittert ==
=== Films (selection) ===
- Erdöl, Bernstein and Kaschuben – Die polnische Ostseeküste. ARD, 2002
- Geld ist nicht alles. Mit einem Filmvorführer durch Masuren. ARD, 2003
- Der stille Bug. Reise durch ein zerrissenes Land. ARD, 2004
- Nur der Wunderrabbi ist geblieben. Reise in die jüdische Vergangenheit Polens. WDR, 2004
- Abenteuer Glück. Vierteilige Dokumentarfilmreihe, ARD, 2005
- Alltag im Schatten des Booms. New York City fünf Jahre nach 9/11. ARD, 2006
- Kofi Annan – Der friedliche Krieger tritt ab. ARD, 2006
- Harlem. Ein schwarzer Stadtteil wird weiß. SWR, 2007
- Hillary gegen Obama. Die Schlacht ums Weiße Haus. ARD, 2008
- Das Ende der New Yorker Bowery. Eine Straße verliert ihr Gesicht. ARD, 2008
- Nostalgie auf dem Wasser – Englische Kanalboote. ARD, 2008
- Inseln jenseits der Zeit – Die Hebriden. ARD, 2009
- Krieg der Kindergangs – Die Straßen von Liverpool. WDR, 2009
- Der Krieg: Ein Spaß für die ganze Familie. WDR, 2010
- Ihre Majestät, die Themse. Englands stolzer Fluss. ARD, 2010
- 60 Jahre unter der Krone – Ein Leben als Queen. ARD, 2012
- Adel verpflichtet – Der Baron und sein Dorf. ARD, 2014
- Das Darknet - Eine Reise in die digitale Unterwelt. ARD, Dokumentation, 9. Januar 2017
- Re: Polen vor der Zerreißprobe – Eine Frau kämpft um ihr Land. Arte, Dokumentation, 2017
- Wohin treibt Polen? ARD 2018
- Schicksalswahl Grossbritannien ARD 2019
- Freiheit für Schottland? ARD 2021

=== Books by Dittert (selection) ===
- Palmen in Warschau. Geschichten aus dem neuen Polen. 2004
- Der stille Bug. Reise durch ein zerrissenes Land. 2004 (together with Fritz Pleitgen)
- London Calling: Als Deutsche auf der Brexit-Insel. 2017

== Awards (selection) ==
- 2004: Hanns-Joachim-Friedrichs-Preis for her work as correspondent in Poland
- 2006: Adolf-Grimme-Preis for documentation "Abenteuer Glück"
- 2006: Publikumspreis der Marler Gruppe for documentation "Abenteuer Glück"
- 2018: Nominierung Deutscher Fernsehpreis for "Das Darknet – Reise in die digitale Unterwelt"
- 2019: Politikjournalistin des Jahres, Award by Medium Magazin
