= Hannelore Gadatsch =

- Born: Hannelore Rosentreter; May 1, 1941; Berlin, Nazi Germany
- Died: March 11, 2024 (aged 82); Baden-Baden, Germany
- Known for: television presenter

Hannelore Gadatsch (née Rosentreter; 1 May 1941 – 11 March 2024) was a German television journalist and presenter. She was one of the first women to present the ARD news programme and won several awards for her documentaries.

== Life ==
After a traineeship at the SFB, she studied law and economics at the Free University of Berlin. From 1963, Gadatsch worked for Saarländischer Rundfunk as a presenter and freelance reporter for politics and economics.

In May 1966, she moved to Südwestfunk where she was an editorial member of the political TV magazine Report Baden-Baden from 1977. In 1978 Gadatsch was awarded the German Social Prize for a report about medical malpractice. In 1983 she received the Media Prize for Development Policy for a Report report on the 1983–1985 famine in Ethiopia, and in 1986 the same prize again for a report on forced resettlement in Ethiopia.

In 1984 and 1985, Gadatsch presented the tagesthemen news magazine, and from 1988 onwards special programs on ARD 1 Plus. In 1992 she became the SWF representative for the newly founded broadcaster ARTE. In 1994 Gadatsch was again awarded the German Social Prize for her SWF documentary What People Do to People - About the Treatment of Torture Victims in Berlin and Copenhagen. In 1997, the Togoese opposition newspaper Le Regard reported that Gadatsch had spoken up for the Gnassingbé Eyadéma government before the European Parliament and had subsequently received the Togolese Ordre du Mono. Gadatsch replied in the same newspaper less than two months later that foreign journalists were treated generously and that her work before the European Parliament had been in the interest of the Togolese people. In 1998, she and four other candidates lost the election for director of the SFB against Horst Schättle.

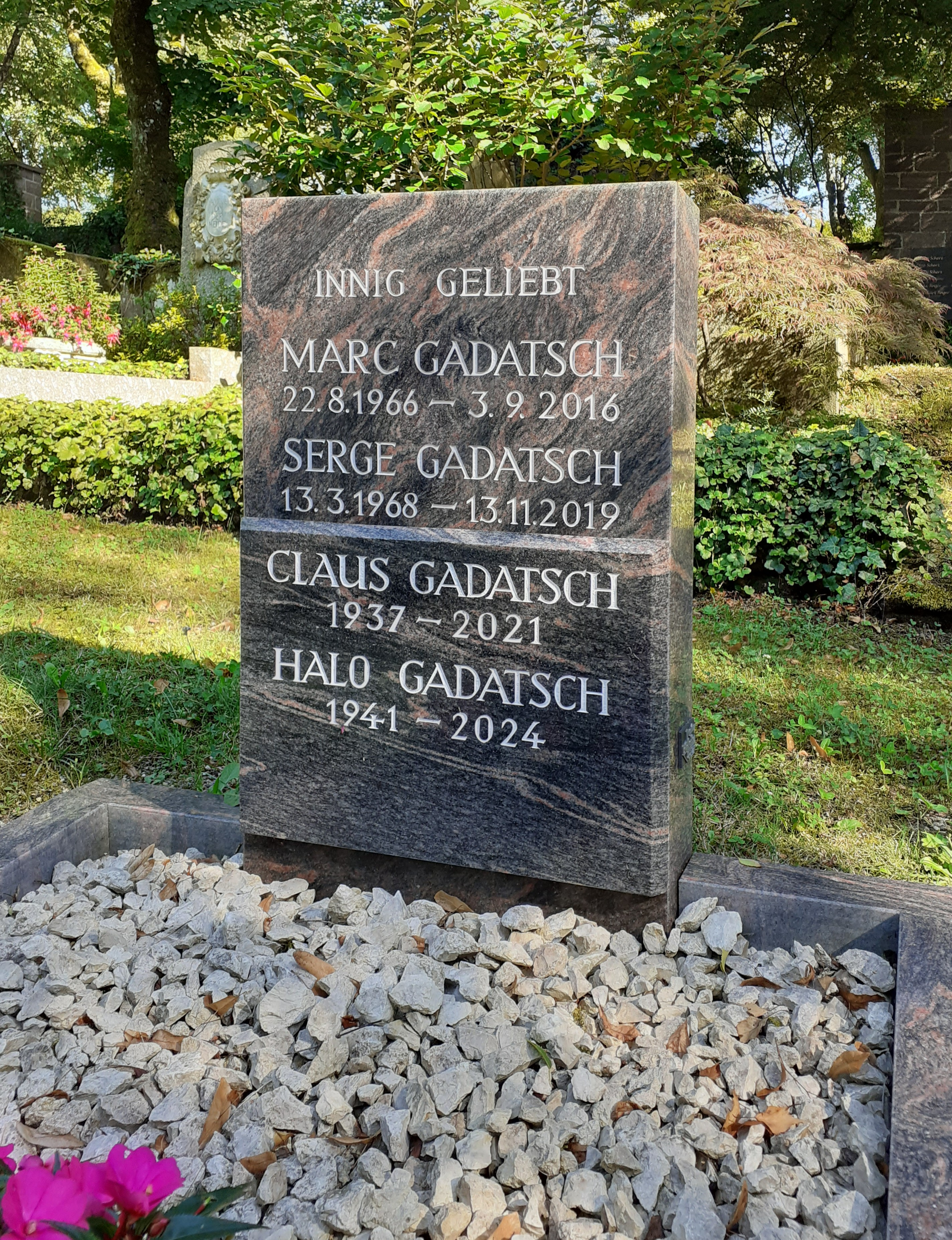
Grave of the Gadatsch family at the main cemetery in Baden-Baden

Gadatsch was a member of the advisory board of the Berlin Treatment Center for Torture Victims. She was married to the journalist Claus-Jürgen Gadatsch (1937–2021) and had two sons (1966–2016, 1968–2019).
