= Gabi Bauer =

German journalist and television presenter

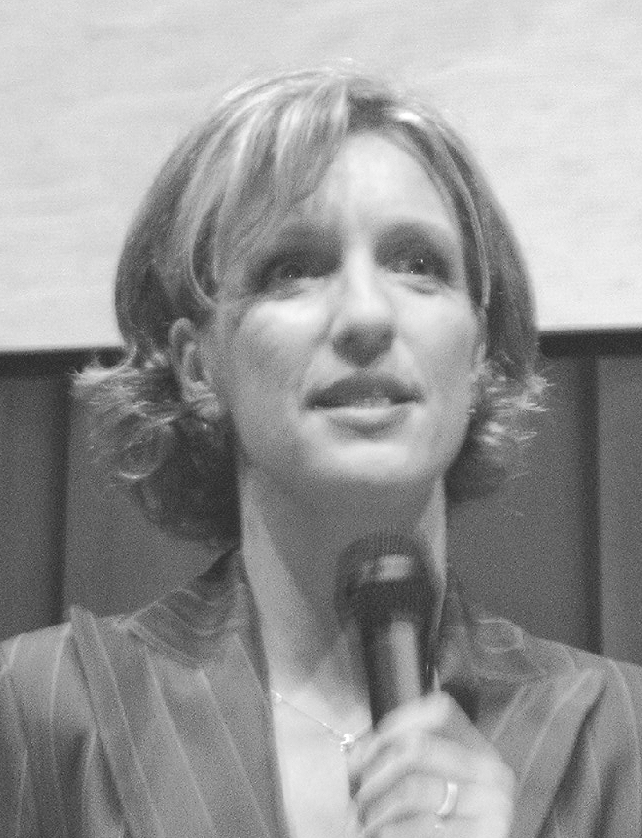
Gabi Bauer (2005)

Gabi Bauer (born 21 July 1962 in Celle) is a German journalist and television presenter.

== Life ==
Bauer studied politics, pedagogic and philosophy in Hamburg, Hannover, Grenoble and Kalamazoo. She works for German broadcaster ARD in Tagesthemen. She is married to fellow journalist Ulrich Exner, with whom she has a pair of twin sons.

== Awards ==
- Deutscher Fernsehpreis
- Bambi
- Telestar
- Goldener Löwe
- 2000: Hanns Joachim Friedrichs Award
