= Maria von Welser =

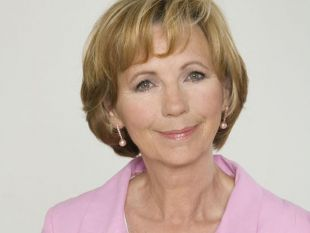
Maria von Welser (2014)

Maria von Welser (born 26 June 1946 in Munich) is a German TV journalist and the President of UNICEF Germany.

Born to Margarete Schüssel, a German fashion journalist, and Eduard M. Schüssel, a businessman, she is by marriage a member of the banking and merchant Welser family.

== Honours ==
- Elisabeth-Selbert-Preis (2007)
- Bundesverdienstkreuz (1996)
- Hanns Joachim Friedrichs Award (1996)
- Publizistikpreis der Landeshauptstadt München (1996)
- Frauenförderpreis für besonderes Engagement von Frauen für Frauen (1996)
- Theodor-Heuss-Medaille (1996)
- Elisabeth-Norgall-Preis (1994, vom International Women's Club of Frankfurt)
- Frau des Jahres (1993)
- Journalistenpreis der Deutschen Aids-Stiftung (1992)
- Silberne Ehrennadel der Stiftung Sicherheit im Skisport des DSV (1987)

== Publications ==
- Maria von Welser, Münchner Oktoberfest Bummel, München 1982, ISBN 3-88781-004-X
- Maria von Welser, Ursula von der Leyen, Wir müssen unser Land für die Frauen verändern. C. Bertelsmann, Munich, 2007, ISBN 978-3-570-00959-8
- Maria von Welser, Leben im Teufelskreis: Kinderarmut in Deutschland – und keiner sieht hin, Gütersloher Verlagshaus, 2009, ISBN 978-3-579-06895-4
