= Ulla Kock am Brink =

German television presenter (born 1961)

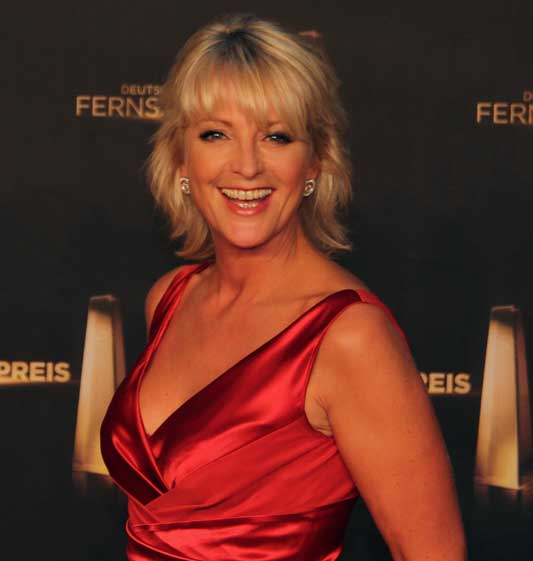
Ulla Kock am Brink, 2012

Ursula Eva Maria Kock am Brink (born 10 July 1961 in Mülheim an der Ruhr) is a German television presenter.

== Life ==
From 1981 to 1984, Kock am Brink studied German studies, Spanish studies and Social sciences at university in Bonn. From 1989 to 2010, Kock am Brink was television presenter for several game shows and other TV shows on different German broadcasters (RTL, ZDF, WDR). In 2003, Kock am Brink married Theo Baltz. They separated in March 2010.

== Filmography ==
- Minute to Win It
- Die Lotto-Show
- Die 100.000 Mark Show
- Verzeih mir
- Glücksritter

== Awards ==
- 1995: Goldene Kamera for Die 100.000 Mark Show
- 1998: Telestar, Best Moderation Entertainment for Die Lotto-Show
