= Thomas Roth (journalist) =

German television presenter (born 1951)

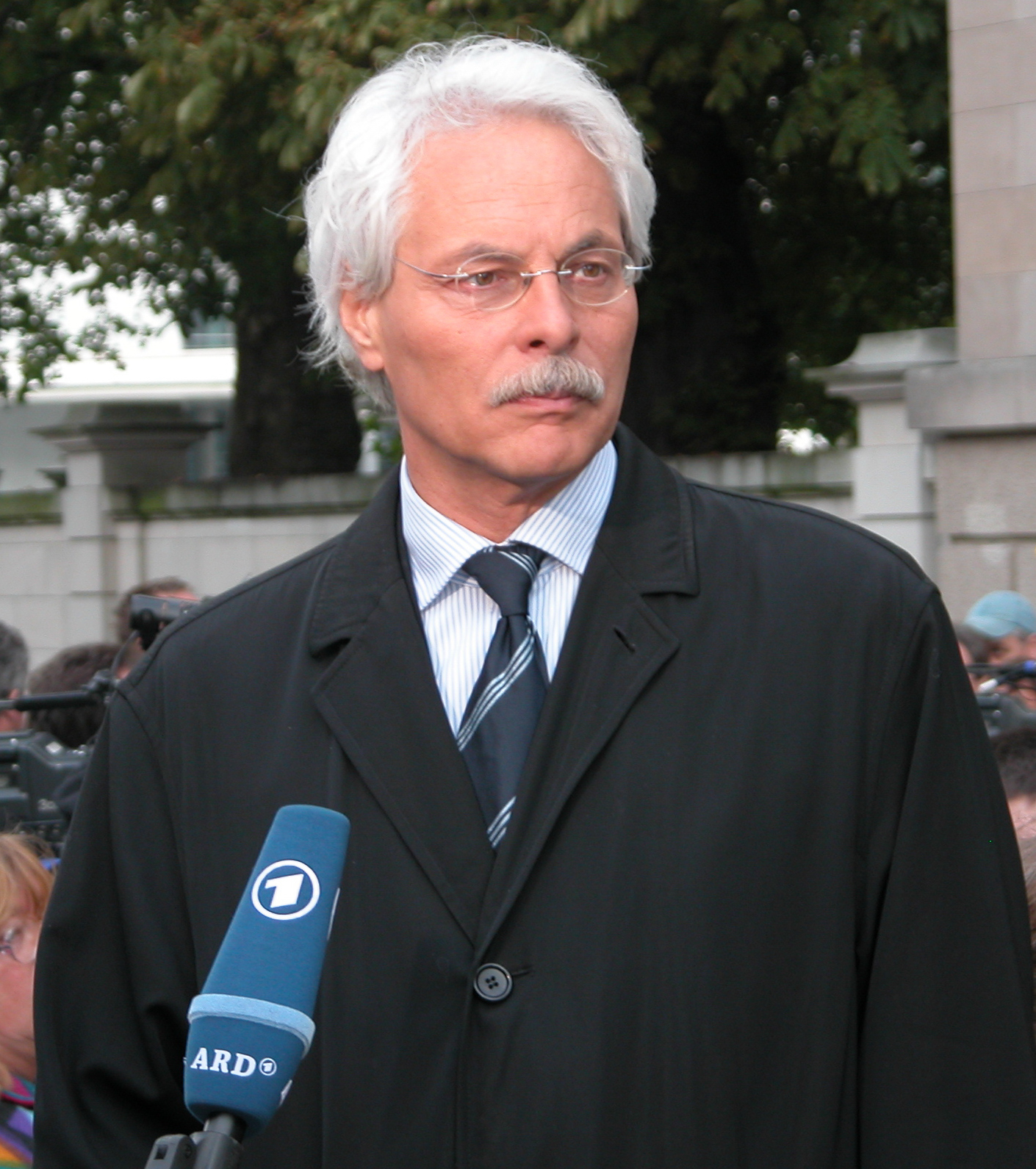
- Roth in 2005
- Born: 21 November 1951 (age 74); Heilbronn, West Germany
- Occupations: News presenter, journalist
- Years active: 1988–2016
- Employer: ARD

Thomas Roth (born 21 November 1951, in Heilbronn) is a German news anchor presenter and television presenter.

== Life ==
He grew up in Heilbronn and attended the local Justinus-Kerner-Gymnasium. He then studied English Literature and German in Heidelberg. In the early 1980s Roth graduated as volunteer at the South German Radio and presented on the radio program SDR 3 the youth program Point . From 1988 to 1991, Thomas Roth was ARD – Correspondent and studio manager in Johannesburg, then he worked in the ARD studio in Moscow. In 1995, he was the radio director of the WDR, before returning in 1998 for four years as a studio manager to Moscow. On 1 May 2002, Thomas Roth took over the post as host and chief editor of the ARD studio in Berlin. From 1 April 2007, he, again, became the head of the ARD Studio in Moscow and then took the same role in its New York Branch from December 2008 until the summer of 2013.

From 5 August 2013, Thomas Roth was the host of Tagesthemen succeeding Tom Buhrow. In April 2016 it was announced that he will leave the show and retire. His successor was Ingo Zamperoni.

== Other activities ==
- Action Reconciliation Service for Peace (ASF), Member of the Board of Trustees

Thomas Roth is a member of the organization Reporters Without Borders and held in the Berlin Academy of Arts on 25 September 2014, a speech on the 20th anniversary of the founding of the German section of the organization.

== Work by Roth ==
- Südafrika. Die letzte Chance. Stuttgart, Vienna: Edition Erdmann by Thienemanns, 1991. ISBN 3-522-65310-6.
- Russisches Tagebuch. Eine Reise von den Tschuktschen bis zum Roten Platz. Munich: List, 1995. ISBN 3-471-78577-9.
- Russland. Das wahre Gesicht einer Weltmacht. Munich: Piper, 2008. ISBN 978-3-492-05103-3.

== Awards ==
- 1995: Hanns Joachim Friedrichs Award
- 1996: Friedrich-Joseph-Haass Award
- 2009: Schweizerisch-Russischer Journalistenpreis
- 2009: Liberty Award
