= Christine Westermann =

German TV and radio host, journalist and author

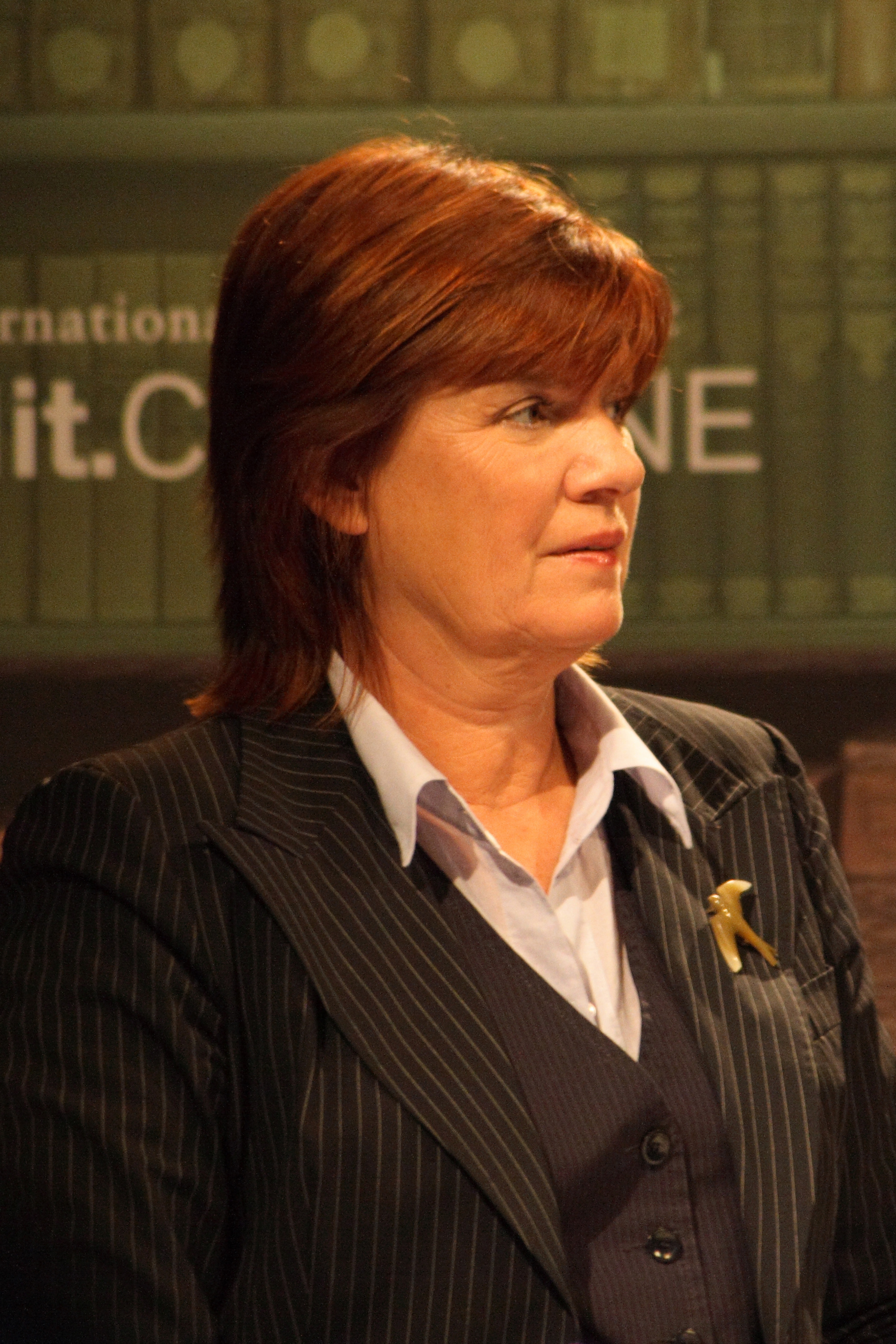
Westermann in 2008

Christine Westermann (born 2 December 1948 in Erfurt) is a German television and radio host, journalist and author.

== Radio and television career ==
Westermann grew up in Mannheim. After finishing her Abitur she did an editorial traineeship at Mannheimer Morgen and attended the Deutsche Journalistenschule (German Journalism School) in Munich. Starting in 1972, she worked as a freelance journalist for several radio and TV stations, produced films and reports and moderated the drehscheibe on ZDF. In 1983 she switched to WDR and moderated the Aktuelle Stunde until 2002, from 1987 on together with Frank Plasberg.

Since 1996 Westermann has been moderating the show Zimmer frei! together with Götz Alsmann, in which an alternating famous "roommate" will be challenged with unusual tasks and games. Westermann and Alsmann called the format a "children's birthday party for celebrities". For their work with Zimmer frei! the duo has been awarded with the Adolf-Grimme-Preis in 2000.

Westermann also works as a host for the German radio station WDR 2, where she presents – rotating with her colleagues – the Montalk (Monday talk) and on Sundays the Buchtipp (Book tip). In 2010 she was awarded with the German Radio prize (Deutscher Radiopreis) in the category Best Interview.

== Writer ==
In 1999 Christine Westermann published her first book Baby, when will you marry me? – A novel from the jungle of relationships (German title: Baby, wann heiratest du mich?). One year later her second book I think he dropped (me). Stories out of the real life (German: Ich glaube, er hat Schluss gemacht. Geschichten aus dem richtigen Leben) followed. In collaboration with Jörg Thadeusz she published the 2008 book Invitation for dance – a twosome story (German: Aufforderung zum Tanz – Eine Zweiergeschichte), a correspondence between two journalists.

== Personal life ==
Between 1990 and 2000 Westermann had a secondary residence in San Francisco, where she worked as a freelance correspondent. During that time she shuttled regularly between the US and her workplace in Cologne. Since June 2000 Westermann has been married to corporate consultant Jochen Baller, who is also her agent. They live in Cologne.

== Novels ==
- Baby, wann heiratest du mich?, Kiepenheuer und Witsch, Köln 1999, ISBN 3-462-03676-9 (1999)
- Ich glaube, er hat Schluss gemacht, Kiepenheuer und Witsch, Köln 2000, ISBN 3-462-02959-2 (2000)
- Aufforderung zum Tanz (2008), Kiepenheuer und Witsch, Köln 2008, ISBN 3-462-03677-7 (2009) – in collaboration with Jörg Thadeusz
- Karneval. Bilder und Geschichten, Kiepenheuer & Witsch, Köln 2009, ISBN 978-3-462-03818-7 (2009) – in collaboration with Stefan Worring
- Da geht noch was: Mit 65 in die Kurve, Kiepenheuer & Witsch, Köln 2013, ISBN 3-462-04561-X (2013).
