= Ruth Hieronymi =

German politician (1947–2025)

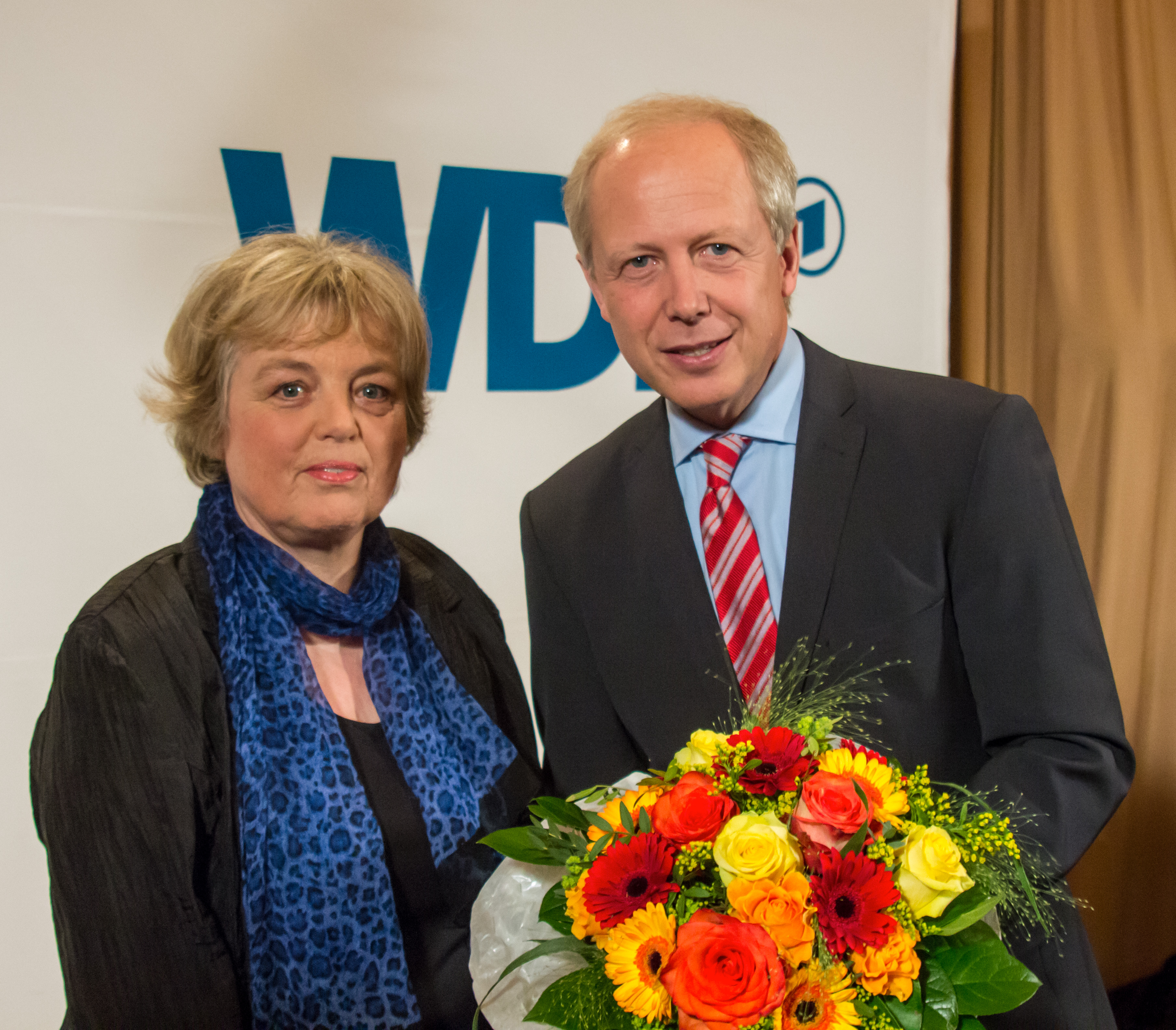
Ruth Hieronymi congratulating Tom Buhrow after he was elected intendant of the WDR (2013)

Ruth Hieronymi (8 November 1947 – 30 April 2025) was a German politician who served as a Member of the European Parliament for North Rhine-Westphalia from 1999 until 2009. She was a member of the conservative Christian Democratic Union, part of the European People's Party.

Hieronymi was chair of the WDR Broadcasting Council until 2016. She died on 30 April 2025, at the age of 77.
