= Golineh Atai =

Iranian-German journalist, TV correspondent and author

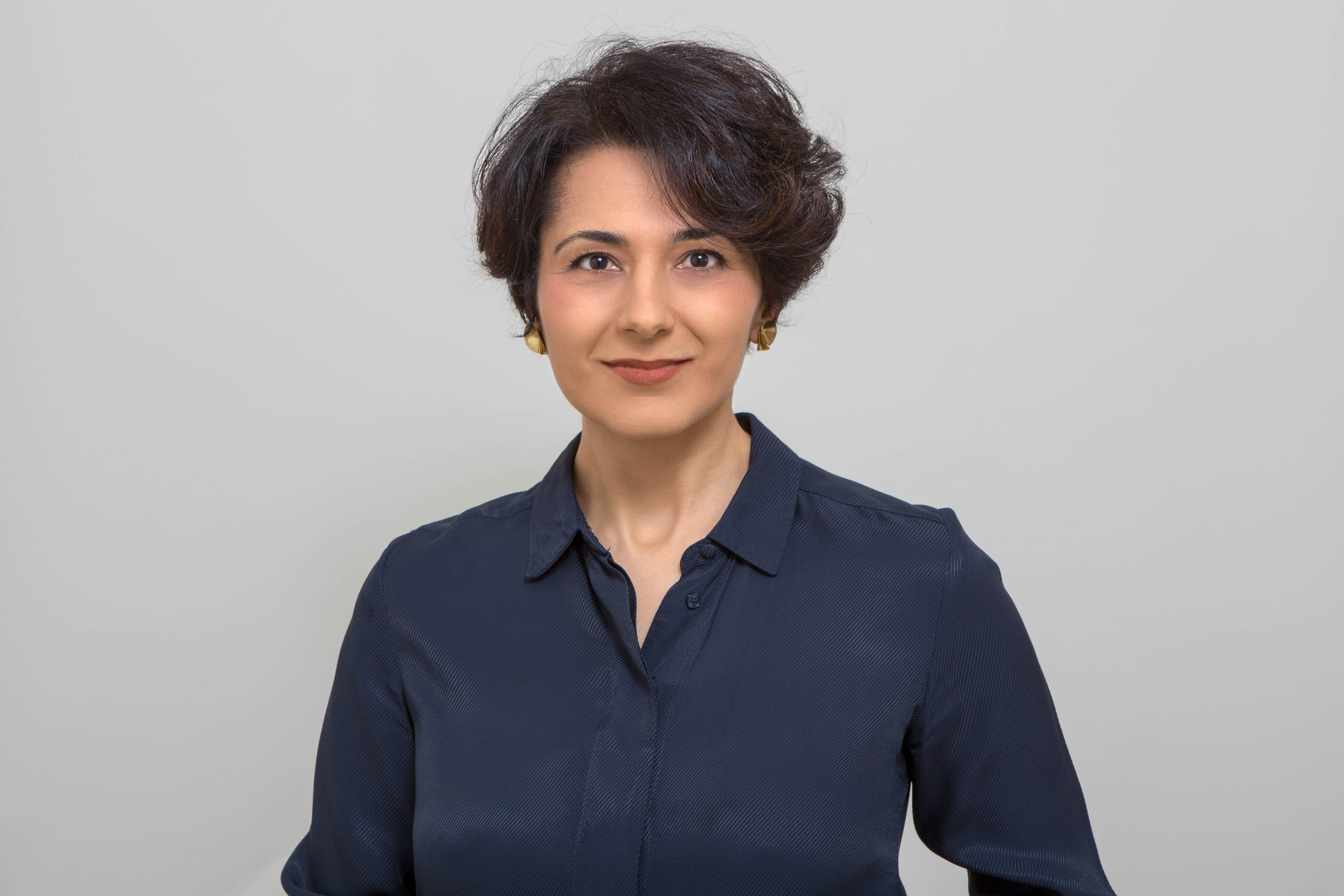
- Atai in 2021
- Born: 8 December 1974 (age 51); Tehran, Iran
- Education: Heidelberg University (M.A.)
- Occupations: Journalist; writer; TV Correspondent
- Employer: ZDF
- Awards: Marie Juchacz Women's Award (2023)

Golineh Atai (Persian: گلینه عطایی; born December 8, 1974, in Tehran) is a German journalist and TV-correspondent. She is known in particular as a Russia expert.

== Life ==
Atai was born in Iran in 1974, and in 1980 at the age of five, she moved with her parents to Germany, growing up in Hoffenheim. After Abitur at the Wilhelmi High school in Sinsheim, she completed her studies at the Heidelberg University (1993–2000) with a Master of Science in Romance Studies, Politology and Iranian Studies and then became a Journalist.

Atai then completed a traineeship at Südwestrundfunk and was responsible for reporting from Rhineland-Palatinate as a TV reporter at the Mainz city. From 2006 to 2008, she worked for ARD (broadcaster) as a correspondent in Cairo. From 2010 to 2011, Atai was Contributing editorin at the ARD morning show. From December 2011, she worked as an editor and reporter at the Review of the Day for WDR in Cologne. From 2013 to 2018, she worked for ARD as a correspondent in Moscow. During the Euromaidan in Ukraine, Atai reported from Kyiv for ARD. In a contribution for the Weltspiegel she documented manipulative practices of Russian and Ukrainian television stations.

On January 1, 2022, she moved to ZDF and took over as head of the studio in Cairo. At the 2022 FIFA World Cup in Qatar, she worked as an on-site correspondent for the ZDF Sport studio.

== Awards ==
- 2005: Research grant from the Otto Brenner Foundation for critical journalism for the project Foreign Adoptions in the Global Children's Market.
- 2007: Nomination for the Adolf Grimme Award in the category Information and Culture
- 2008: Nomination for the Reemtsma Liberty Award
- 2010: Media Award "Children's Rights in One World" of Kindernothilfe for "Suche Kind, zahle bar – Die Adoptionslobby" (Search child, pay cash – The adoption lobby) by WDR
- 2014: Hanns Joachim Friedrichs Prize for Television Journalism
- 2014: Journalist of the Year by Medium Magazin for her "outstanding reporting in the debate on the Ukraine crisis, which has been going on for more than a year."
- 2015: Peter Scholl Latour Prize for her Weltspiegel feature Ukraine: Quo vadis?
- 2023: Marie Juchacz Women's Award for gender equality through credible, balanced foreign journalism from Russia, Ukraine, Iran, and the Arab world.
- 2023: Nomination for the Grimme-Preis for reporting from the Arab region.

== Works ==
- The truth is the enemy – Why Russia is so different (In German: Die Wahrheit ist der Feind – Warum Russland so anders ist), Rowohlt Verlag, Berlin 2019, ISBN 978-3-7371-0061-8.
- Iran – Freedom is Female (In German: Iran – Die Freiheit ist weiblich. Rowohlt, Berlin 2021, ISBN 978-3-7371-0118-9
