= Barbara Dickmann =

German journalist

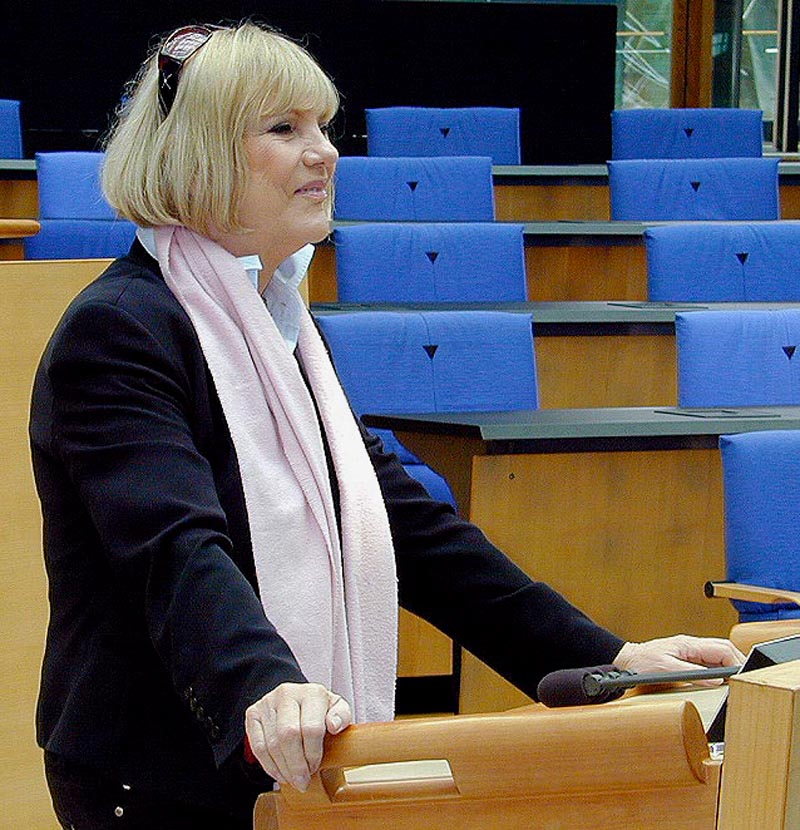
- Born: 21 June 1942 (age 84)
- Occupation: journalist

Barbara Dickmann (born 21 June 1942 in Kattowitz, Silesia) is a German journalist.

== Career ==
Barbara Dickmann began studying sports, but broke it off in 1964 in favour of a traineeship at the Neue Presse in Würzburg, where she rose to become a local editor. From 1967 she worked for Hessischer Rundfunk, in 1971 she presented the Hessenschau. In 1977 she moved to ARD Tagesthemen as editor and first woman presenter (from 1979), in 1983 she became head of the Bonn Stern office. In 1983, she was commissioned by Stern TV to shoot the film Der Fund, which was to document the sensational discovery of the Hitler diaries.

In 1985, Dickmann took up her work as editor-in-chief at UFA and became programme officer for Bertelsmann. In 1988/1989 she worked for Deutsche Welle, since 1989 in the editorial department of the ZDF programme ML Mona Lisa, whose editorial director she was from 2003 to 2008.

== Works ==
- Barbara Dickmann, Angelica Fell: Und niemand weiß, warum ... Das rätselhafte Kindersterben; ein ML-Mona-Lisa-Buch; München: mvg Verlag, 2008; ISBN 978-3-636-06403-5. The book is about the hushed-up investigations surrounding the Leukaemia Cluster Elbmarsch.
- Lieber heute aktiv als morgen radioaktiv; LAIKA Verlag, 2012; ISBN 978-3-942281-02-7, authors: Barbara Dickmann, Angelica Fell
- Der Spielemacher: Paul Gauselmann, the biography; narrated by Barbara Dickmann, Econ, Berlin 2017, ISBN 978-3-430-20246-6

== Awards ==
- 1972 – Regional Film Award for the best investigative documentary "Kredithaie"
- 1981 – Bambi as best presenter of a polit, current affairs programme
- 1982 – 3rd place in the Goldene Kamera for best news presenter (viewer award)
- 1987 – Computer manufacturer award for Wer hat Angst vor dem kleinen Chip? (BR)
- 1991 – Journalistenpreis der Deutschen Aids-Stiftung for Ugandas sterbende Mütter (ZDF)
- 1997 – Umweltpreis für Journalisten der Deutschen Umweltstiftung für die ML Mona Lisa Editorial team (ZDF)
- 2006 – Prix Europa Ranking 9th place of the best European documentaries in the category TV Current Affairs Programme
- 2007 – Audience Award of the Öko-Filmtour 2007 for the documentary "Und keiner weiss warum..."
- 2007 – Third prize 'Pro Ehrenamt' of the district Neuss, North Rhine-Westphalia
- 2009 – Nomination Öko-Filmtour-Festival for reports on the KiKK-Study
- 2011 – Honourable mention for special merits of the Nuclear-Free Future Award
- 2012 – International Environmental Award
