= Pinar Atalay =

German radio and television presenter

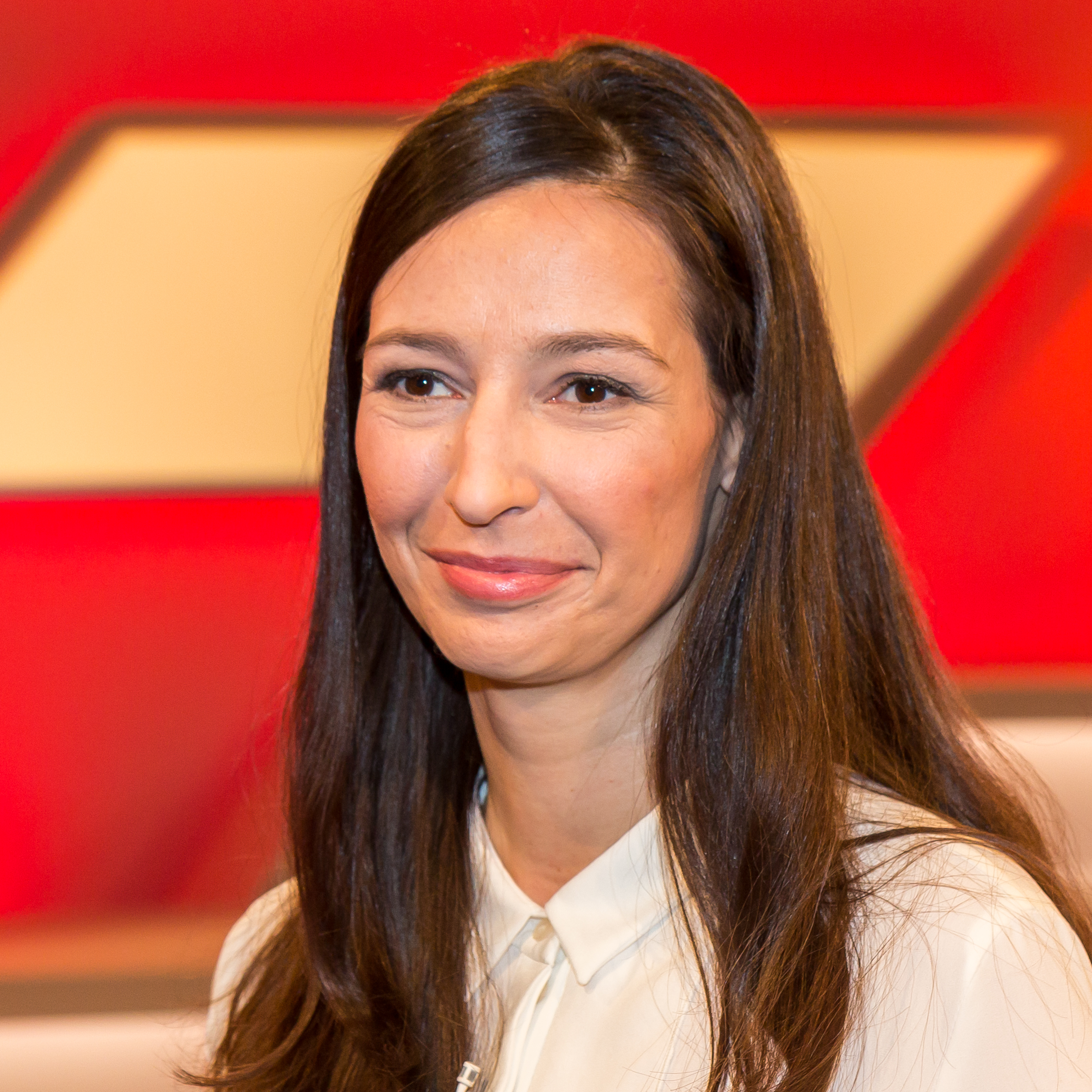
- Atalay in 2018
- Born: 27 April 1978 (age 48); Lemgo, West Germany
- Occupations: Journalist, Radio and television presenter

Pinar Atalay (born 27 April 1978) is a German journalist, talk show host and radio and television presenter.

== Life and career ==
Atalay was born to Turkish immigrant parents in Lemgo, West Germany. After high school she ran a boutique in Lemgo for one year. She then worked as an intern at Radio NRW and Radio Lippe. Atalay later worked as a freelancer and trainee, and was, for a time, an early-morning presenter at the local radio station Antenne Münster.

On WDR Fernsehen, Atalay regularly hosted Cosmo TV. For ARD-aktuell, she hosted regular news and special programs, as well as for Das Erste. She also worked as a reporter and presenter for NDR Fernsehen, NDR Radio and Radio Bremen. From 2010 onwards, she presented programs on Phoenix. In March 2014, Atalay became a presenter of the Tagesthemen evening news, succeeding Ingo Zamperoni. In a 2018 survey conducted by Forsa Institute, she was voted one of Germany's most trusted news presenters.

In addition to her role as presenter, Atalay wrote articles for the German business magazine Plusminus from 2014.

In June 2021, German private TV channel RTL announced that Atalay would be starting as news anchor in August 2021. Alongside Peter Kloeppel, she moderated one of three TV election debates between the three candidates to succeed Chancellor Angela Merkel – Annalena Baerbock, Armin Laschet and Olaf Scholz – ahead of the 2021 elections, which was aired live on both RTL and n-tv during prime-time.

== Other activities ==
- Jugend debattiert, Member of the Board of Trustees

== Personal life ==
In January 2017, Atalay gave birth to a daughter.
