= Hart aber fair =

German political talk show

hart aber fair
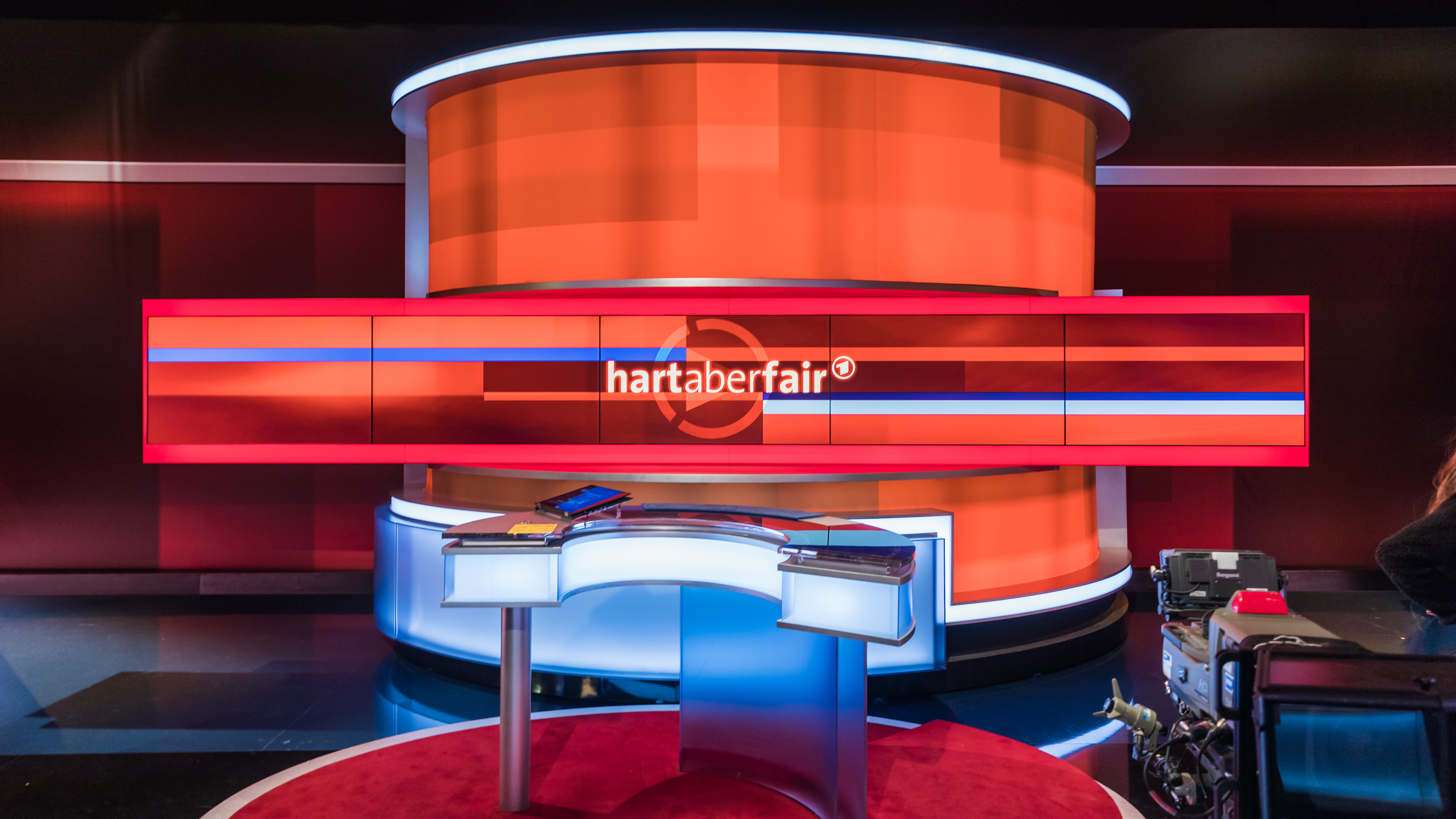
- Presented by: Louis Klamroth
- Country of origin: Germany
- Original language: German

Production
- Producer: Westdeutscher Rundfunk
- Production locations: Cologne; Berlin
- Running time: 75 min

Original release
- Release: 31 January 2001

hart aber fair (English: "hard but fair") is a German weekly political talk show. In the 75-minute broadcast on Monday evening on Das Erste, presenter Frank Plasberg discussed a controversial topic with his guests. Spectators receive additional information through short feature films and can participate directly. Before switching to ARD's main programme Das Erste, the programme was broadcast at WDR Fernsehen for seven years. Louis Klamroth became the new presenter in 2023.

== Concept ==
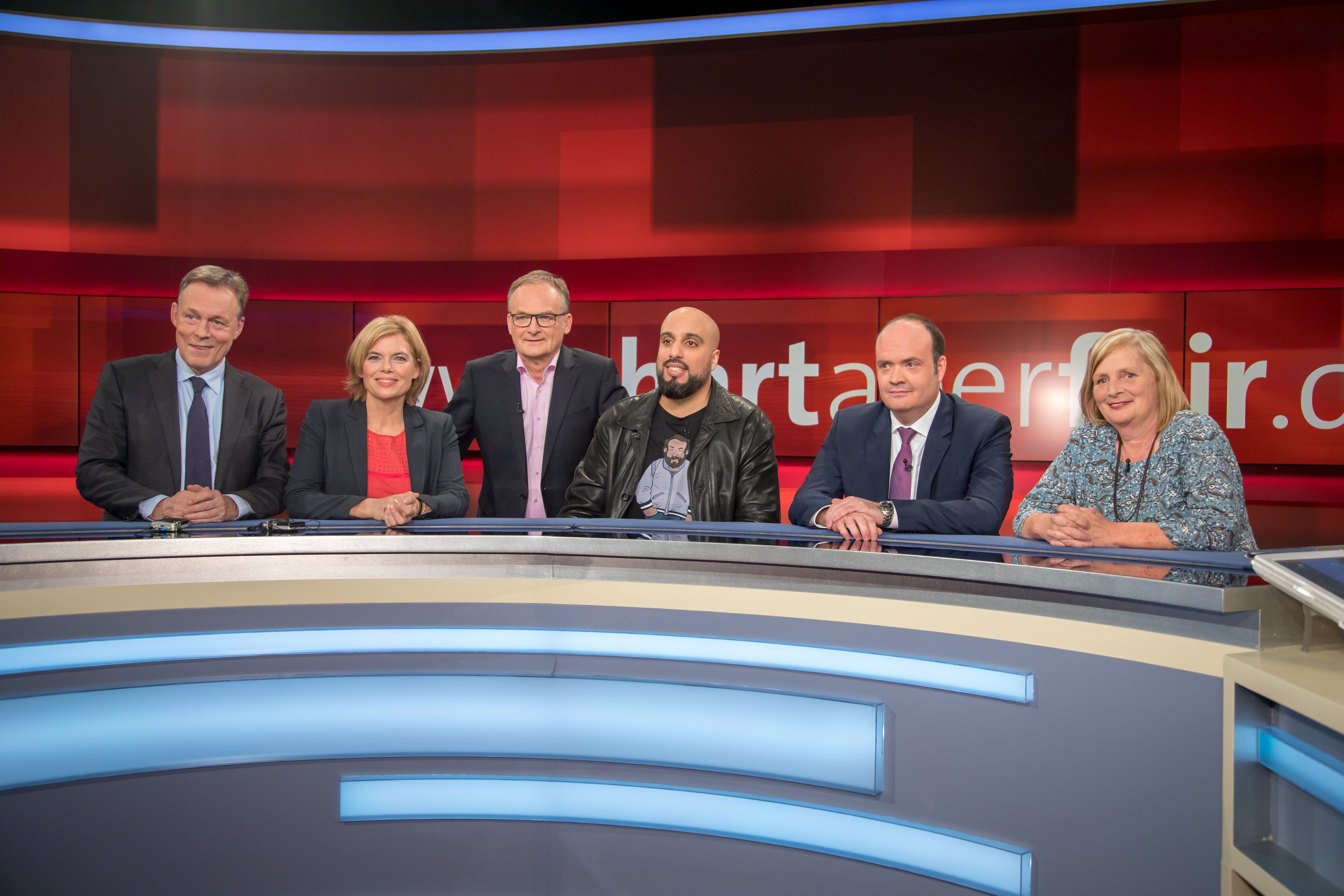
Group picture with the participants Thomas Oppermann, Julia Klöckner, Frank Plasberg, Abdelkarim Zemhoute, Robin Alexander and Bettina Gaus of the 18 December 2017 show

As the name suggests, the discussion should be open and controversial. Instead of ideological and party-political statements, the focus should be on factual arguments. Therefore, besides politicians, scientific experts, representatives of other organisations and directly involved or affected persons are also among the participants of the discussion round. The guests are selected in such a way that different positions are represented. The editorial staff researches information on the topic of the respective programme in order to provide additional arguments and present the background more clearly for the viewers.

At the beginning of the programme, the host Frank Plasberg mentioned the topic to be discussed, which is formulated as a question with a slogan. Afterwards the five guests are introduced individually, whereby an off-voice names their name and function and classifies the person with a quotation. The guests are usually placed at the table in such a way that the representatives of the most extreme Pro- and Con-arguments sit on the very outside. In the course of the discussions that are now beginning, Plasberg intervened with feature films at the appropriate opportunity. In the short contributions the spectators receive additional information by statistics, interviews or newspaper reports. Sometimes one of the guests is also addressed directly in an article and confronted with his earlier, controversial statements.

In addition to the guests at the table, there is usually a one-on-one conversation with a person who deals with the topic in a special way. During the second half of the show, Plasberg talked to his colleague Brigitte Büscher, who will present a selection of viewer reactions. Before and during the show, TV viewers have the opportunity to comment on the topic by phone, e-mail, Facebook or in the guestbook on the website. In the final round with the guests at the table, an imaginative question is asked to determine who convinced whom. On Tuesday noon the editorial staff publishes the so-called fact check (Faktencheck) on the Internet, in which some controversial statements or figures given by the guests are checked.

Louis Klamroth did not change the concept of the talk show in 2023.

== Production ==
The programme will be broadcast live either from Cologne or Berlin. In Cologne, the production takes place in Studio A of the Funkhaus Wallrafplatz. The Berlin location, which was chosen because of its proximity to the Federal Government, is located in Studio C of Studio Berlin Adlershof GmbH in Adlershof. Before 21 October 2009, the Globe City Studio was used in the capital. Monday's live broadcast usually starts at 9:00 pm. The first repetitions of the current issue can be seen the following night at 03:10 am at Das Erste and on Tuesday morning at 8:45 am at WDR Fernsehen, on the same day at 10:15 am at 3sat. In addition, tagesschau24 shows the programme on Tuesdays at 8:15 pm.

From its premiere on 31 January 2001 to 10 October 2007, Hart aber fair was broadcast at WDR Fernsehen on Wednesdays at 8:15 p.m. as a 90-minute format.

After Frank Plasberg's leave in January 2023, Louis Klamroth took over the moderation but the production company „Ansager und Schnipselmann“ (with Plasberg as co-owner) was still in charge. Yet according to Plasberg there was soon a relationship breakdown between the new moderator and the old staff and the contract with „Ansager und Schnipselmann“ has been terminated effective December 2023 on Klamroth's request.

== Sign language ==
Hart aber fair is accompanied by sign language via the HbbTV service of Das Erste since 8 January 2018.

== Hosts ==
- Frank Plasberg (2001–2022)
- Louis Klamroth (2023–present)
