= Tom Buhrow =

German journalist (born 1958)

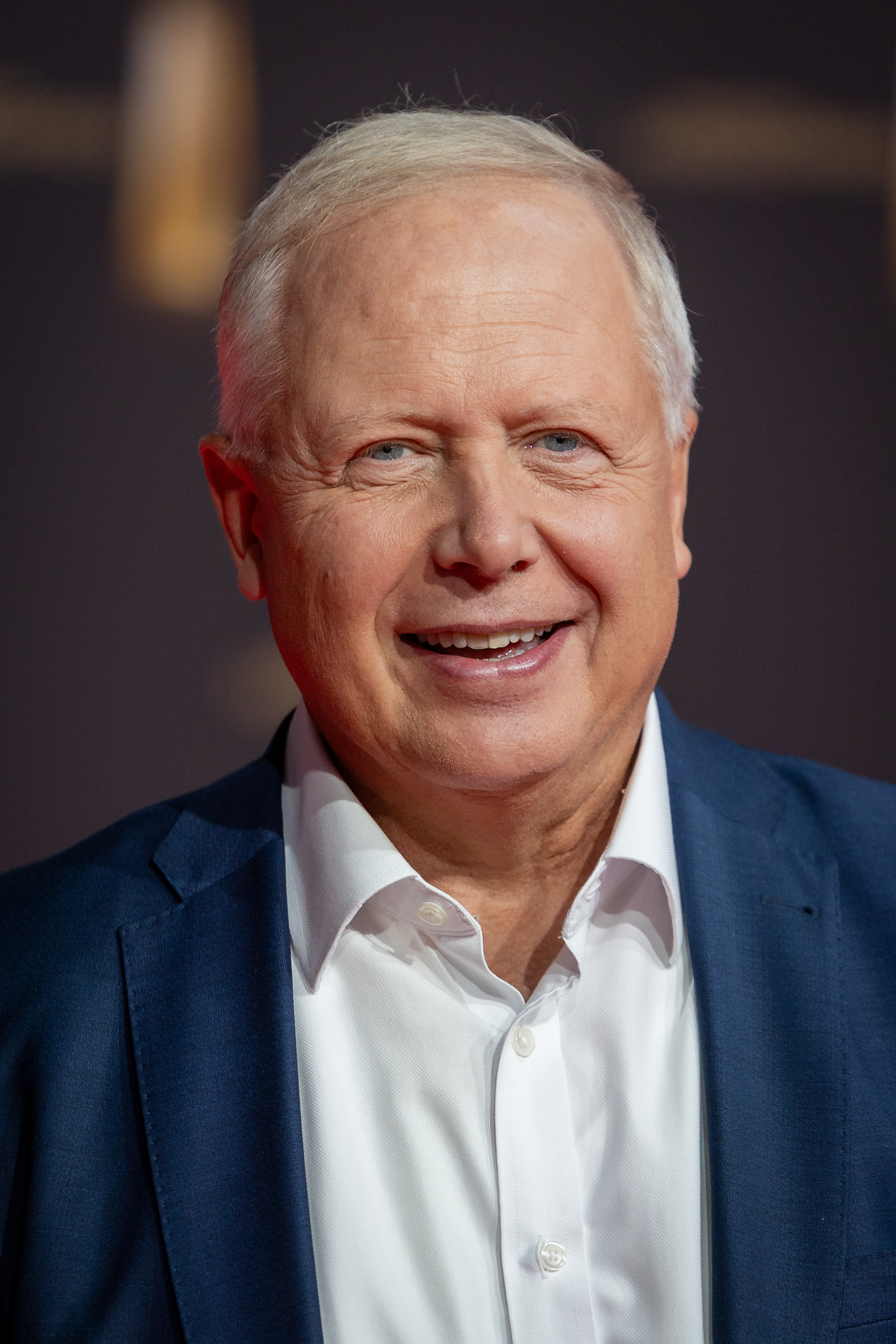
- Buhrow at the Deutscher Fernsehpreis in 2024
- Born: 29 September 1958 (age 67); Troisdorf, West Germany (now Germany)
- Occupation: Journalist

Tom Buhrow (born 29 September 1958) is a German journalist who served as director general of public broadcaster WDR from 2013 to 2024. In this capacity, he also served as chair of the ARD from 1 January 2020 to 31 December 2021 and from 4 August to 31 December 2022.

== Early life and education ==
Buhrow was born in Troisdorf. He studied history and political science in Bonn.

== Career ==
In 1978, Buhrow worked at the local newspaper Bonner General-Anzeiger. In 1985, he was trained at the largest television station in North Rhine-Westphalia, WDR. Since 1986 he was the editor, reporter and bureau chief of the shows Aktuelle Stunde and West 3 Aktuell. He then worked as an editor and reporter at the most-seen German nightly news, the Tagesschau.

In 1992/1993, Buhrow became the correspondent of the ARD bureau in Washington D.C. in the midst of the 1992 U.S. presidential election.

Between January 2000 and 2002, Buhrow worked as a correspondent at the ARD bureau in Paris. On 1 July 2002, he took over from Claus Kleber as chief of the ARD bureau in Washington; Kleber went to ZDF as the anchorman for the news programme heute-journal.

On 1 September 2006, Buhrow replaced Ulrich Wickert as the host of the news programme Tagesthemen. He published a book about his years in the United States, Mein Amerika, Dein Amerika (My America, your America).

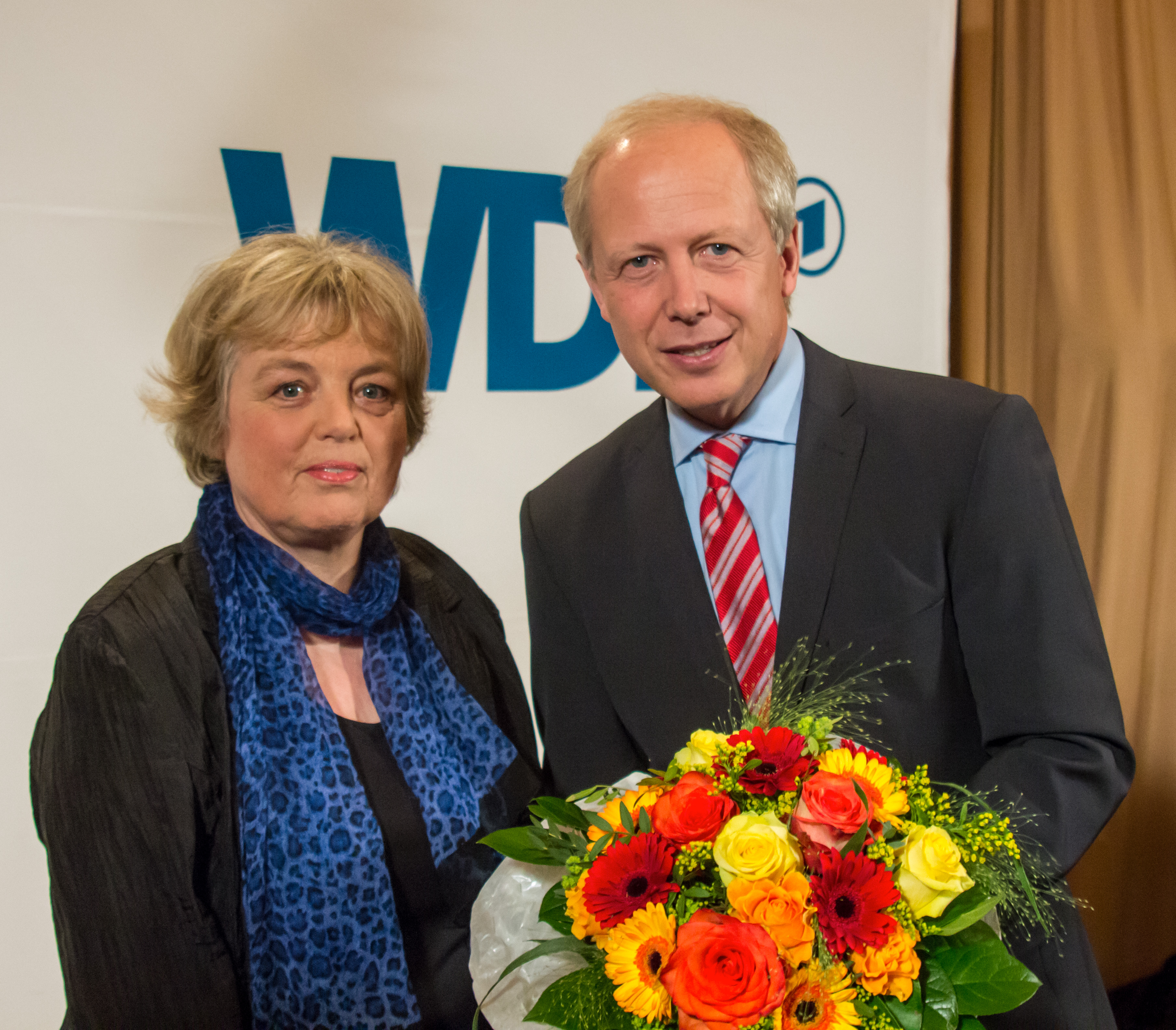
Ruth Hieronymi congratulates Tom Buhrow after he was elected intendant of the WDR.

On 29 May 2013, Buhrow was elected director general (intendant) of the Westdeutscher Rundfunk (WDR).

== Other activities ==
- Bonner Akademie für Forschung und Lehre praktischer Politik (BAPP), Member of the Board of Trustees
- Civis Media Foundation, member of the board of trustees (since 2013)
- International Journalists' Programmes (IJP), member of the board of trustees
- German Coordinating-Council for Christian-Jewish Cooperation Organizations, member of the board of trustees
- Kunststiftung NRW, member of the board of trustees
- German Cancer Foundation, member of the board of trustees

== Personal life ==
Buhrow was married to his colleague Sabine Stamer, but divorced in April 2020. They have two daughters.
