= Telestar =

Former German television award

The Telestar was a former German television award, created by Das Erste and ZDF. It was succeeded in 1999 by the Deutscher Fernsehpreis. In 1999, the Telestar was replaced by the German Television Award from ARD, ZDF, RTL, and Sat.1.
