= Tagesthemen =

German television news magazine

- Logo since 1997
- Presented by: Ingo Zamperoni; Aline Abboud; Helge Fuhst; Jessy Wellmer
- Countries of origin: West Germany (1978-1990); Germany (1990-present)
- Original language: German

Production
- Producer: ARD-aktuell
- Production location: Hamburg
- Running time: Monday–Thursday: 30 minutes; Friday–Sunday: 15–20 minutes

Original release
- Network: Das Erste
- Release: 2 January 1978 – present

Tagesthemen (German: [ˈtaːɡəsˌteːmən]) is one of Germany's main daily television news magazines, presented by journalists Helge Fuhst, Aline Abboud, Ingo Zamperoni and Jessy Wellmer. Second only to the 20:00 Tagesschau (lit. 'Review of the Day') Tagesthemen (lit. 'Issues of the Day') is ARD's most important newscast. It is different in style and content from Tagesschau and is broadcast Mondays to Thursdays at 22:15, Fridays at 23:15, Saturdays at varying times and Sundays at 22:45. On special news occasions, a Tagesthemen extra is also broadcast before the main show. Each Tagesthemen broadcast has a single host, a single newsreader for the news block, usually from the earlier Tagesschau, a weather presenter broadcasting from Frankfurt, and a presenter for the sports block on the weekends. Previously recorded Tagesthemen newscasts can also be seen internationally via YouTube on Tagesschau's YouTube Channel.

== History ==
In January 1978, Tagesthemen replaced the late edition of Tagesschau, which had been broadcast until then. The broadcast lasts a half hour on weekdays; it is shorter on Fridays (15 minutes) Saturdays (20 minutes) and Sundays (15 minutes).

In contrast to Tagesschau, which provides only an overview of the news, Tagesthemen is designed to also provide the viewer with more information, context and background. The program usually features four to five segments on the stories and themes of the day.

Previously, the program used a variation of the Tagesschau theme, Hammond Fantasy, with the first and last notes in the same keys. From 1997 to 2014, Tagesthemen used the same music as Tagesschau. Currently, Tagesthemen uses a different variation of the Hammond Fantasy, similar to the original Tagesthemen theme.

Tagesschau editorial staff provide a daily news summary to the program. A weather report was part of the news summary until 2002: since then it has been presented by a meteorologist, in cooperation with Meteomedia AG, a privately owned company. Since 2020, the weather report is presented from the ARD weather center at the studios of Hessischer Rundfunk in Frankfurt.

Tagesthemen's market share sank with the opening of media competition in Germany; nevertheless, it still lies today at about 12% — this amounts to about 2.5 million viewers per broadcast. Tagesthemen is one of the most influential opinion builders in Germany.

== Presenters ==
Since 1 October 1985 Tagesthemen, like Tagesschau, has been presented by various hosts. Since the start, the hosts alternate weekly.

The hosts write their scripts themselves; the presentation generally has a much looser style than Tagesschau. Since the Tagesthemen hosts are not restricted to simply reading the daily dispatches, they can develop a lively, personal style compared to their colleagues at Tagesschau, although they are still required to be neutral and objective.

=== Current presenters ===
Presenter	Date started	Comments
Ingo Zamperoni	24 October 2016	Main presenter
Jessy Wellmer	30 October 2023	Main presenter
Julia Niharika-Sen	8 March 2024	Main presenter

=== 1985 onwards ===
Presenter	Started	Ended
Ulrike Wolf	1 October 1985	23 July 1987
Hanns Joachim Friedrichs	14 October 1985	27 June 1991
Sabine Christiansen	4 August 1987	September 1997
Ulrich Wickert	1 July 1991	31 August 2006
Ulrich Deppendorf (Relief presenter)	1993	1999
Gabi Bauer	6 September 1997	5 April 2001
Anne Will	14 April 2001	24 June 2007
Tom Buhrow	1 September 2006	16 June 2013
Caren Miosga	16 July 2007	5 October 2023
Ingo Zamperoni (Relief presenter)	6 January 2013	12 January 2014
Thomas Roth	5 August 2013	2 October 2016
Pinar Atalay (Relief presenter)	7 March 2014	9 May 2021

=== 1978-1985 ===
- Wolf von Lojewski, 1978-1979
- Klaus Stephan, 1978
- Alexander von Bentheim, 1978 - 1980
- Barbara Dickmann, 1979 - 1983
- Edmund Gruber, 1984 - ?
- Gisela Mahlmann, 1980-1981
- Klaus Bednarz, 1982 - 1983
- Gerhard Fuchs, 1982-1985
- Klaus-Peter Siegloch, 1982-1985
- Günther von Lojewski, 1978 - ???
- Günther Müggenburg, 1978 - 1983
- Ernst-Dieter Lueg, 1978 - 1985
- Rüdiger Hoffmann, 1982 - 1985
- Otto Deppe, 1982-1983
- Elke Herrmann, 1984-1986
- Hannelore Gadatsch, 1984-1985

== Trivia ==
- In 2001, as part of a bet that he lost in Wetten, dass..?, the show's host, Thomas Gottschalk, had to introduce the weather on Tagesthemen.
- On 12 August 2014 Tagesthemen host Caren Miosga honored the deceased Hollywood actor Robin Williams by standing on the host's desk. With this gesture she alluded to Williams' movie Dead Poets Society, one of Williams' most well-known movies in whose final scene pupils stand atop of their desks to show respect toward their teacher played by the deceased actor.
- The opening theme of Tagesthemen on 23 October 2020 was played live from the studio in rock style arranged by Berlin rock band Die Ärzte.
