= Deutscher Fernsehpreis =

German television award

- Description: Annual award for excellence in German television programming
- Country: Germany
- Presented by: Das Erste, ZDF, RTL, Sat.1
- Website: www.deutscher-fernsehpreis.de

The Deutscher Fernsehpreis (German Television Award) is an annual German award for television programming, created in 1999, by German television channels Das Erste, ZDF, RTL and Sat.1. It was created to be an equivalent to the Emmy Awards, though it is not organized by an academy. The Fernsehpreis is the successor to both the Telestar (Das Erste and ZDF) and the Goldener Löwe (RTL) awards.

== History ==
The first award took place on 2 October 1999 in Cologne. Every year another of the participating stations broadcast the ceremony:

#	Date	Year	Host(s)	Network	Site
1st	2 October 1999	1998–99	Jochen Busse, Johannes B. Kerner, Gabi Bauer and Kai Pflaume	RTL (Note: The ceremony was broadcast on television one day later.)	Coloneum Cologne
2nd	7 October 2000	1999–2000	Ulla Kock am Brink	ZDF	Coloneum Cologne
3rd	6 October 2001	2000–01	Anke Engelke and Hape Kerkeling	Sat.1	Coloneum Cologne
4th	5 October 2002	2001–02	Sandra Maischberger and Dirk Bach	Das Erste	Coloneum Cologne
5th	27 September 2003	2002–03	Günther Jauch	RTL (Note: The ceremony was live broadcast on television.)	Coloneum Cologne
6th	9 October 2004	2003–04	Thomas Gottschalk	ZDF	Coloneum Cologne
7th	15 October 2005	2004–05	Anke Engelke and Hugo Egon Balder	Sat.1	Coloneum Cologne
8th	20 October 2006	2005–06	Jörg Pilawa	Das Erste	Coloneum Cologne
9th	29 September 2007	2006–07	Marco Schreyl	RTL	Coloneum Cologne
10th	11 October 2008	2007–08	Thomas Gottschalk	ZDF	Coloneum Cologne
11th	26 September 2009	2008–09	Anke Engelke and Bastian Pastewka^{1}	Sat.1	Coloneum Cologne
12th	9 October 2010	2009–10	Sandra Maischberger and Kurt Krömer	Das Erste	Coloneum Cologne
13th	2 October 2011	2010–11	Marco Schreyl and Nazan Eckes	RTL	Coloneum Cologne
14th	2 October 2012	2011–12	Oliver Welke and Olaf Schubert	ZDF (Note: The ceremony was broadcast on television two days later.)	Coloneum Cologne
15th	2 October 2013	2012–13	Oliver Pocher and Cindy aus Marzahn	Sat.1	Coloneum Cologne
16th	2 October 2014	2013–14	Sandra Maischberger, Hans Sigl and Klaas Heufer-Umlauf	Das Erste	Coloneum Cologne
17th	13 January 2016	2014–15	Barbara Schöneberger	RTL (Note: no live broadcast of the ceremony on television; only a 30- to 45-minute summary of the ceremony)	Rheinterrasse Düsseldorf
18th	2 February 2017	2016	Barbara Schöneberger	ZDF	Rheinterrasse Düsseldorf
19th	26 January 2018	2017	Barbara Schöneberger	Sat.1 (Note: no live broadcast or summary of the ceremony on television)	Palladium Cologne
20th	31 January 2019	2018	Barbara Schöneberger and Steffen Hallaschka	Das Erste (Note: The ceremony was live broadcast on the web stream; two hour summary of the ceremony on television)	Rheinterrasse Düsseldorf
21st	17 June 2020 (Note: The ceremony was originally scheduled to be held on 6 June 2020, but the ceremony was canceled due to the COVID-19 pandemic. The winners were announced in an official press release on 17 June 2020.)	2019–20	none (Note: The ceremony was canceled due to the COVID-19 pandemic.)	none (Note: The ceremony was canceled due to the COVID-19 pandemic. Originally the broadcaster RTL was supposed to broadcast the ceremony.)	none (Note: The ceremony was originally scheduled to be held at the Coloneum Cologne, but the ceremony was canceled due to the COVID-19 pandemic.)
22nd	16 September 2021	2020–21	Barbara Schöneberger	RTL	
