= List of defunct newspapers of Hungary =

This is a list of defunct newspapers in Hungary.

== Daily ==
| Title | Language | Print / Online | Est. | Ceased | Owner | Orientation | Link |
|---|---|---|---|---|---|---|---|
| 888 | Hungarian | Online | 2015 | 2023 | KESMA | Right, conservatism | 888.hu (now directs to origo.hu) |
| Budapesti Hírlap | Hungarian | Print | 1881 | 1938 | Jenő Rákosi | Conservative | - |
| Esti Budapest | Hungarian | Print | 1952 | 1956 | Hungarian Working People's Party | Communism, Socialism, Marxism–Leninism | - |
| Esti Hírlap | Hungarian | Print | 1956 | 1996 | Hungarian Socialist Workers' Party (1956-1990); Mirror Group (1990-1992); Hungarian News Publishing Company (1990-1996) | Communism, Socialism, Marxism–Leninism, Kádárism | - |
| Faktor | Hungarian | Online | 2008 | 2019 | KESMA | Right, conservatism | faktor.hu (now works as an archive) |
| Mercurius Hungaricus | Latin | Print | 1705 | 1710 | Antal Esterházy de Galánta | Anti-Habsburgism, Protestantism, first newspaper in Hungary | - |
| Reggel | Hungarian | Print | 2004 | 2005 | Axel Springer | Left, liberalism | - |
| Lokál | Hungarian | Both | 2015 | 2020 | KESMA | Right, conservatism | lokal.hu (now directs to metropol.hu) |
| Napi Gazdaság | Hungarian | Both | 1991 | 2015 | Gábor Liszkay | Right, conservatism | www.napi.hu (now it works independent from Napi Gazdaság) |
| Népszabadság | Hungarian | Both | 1956 | 2016 | Hungarian Socialist Workers' Party (1956-1990); Bertelsmann(50%), Free Press Foundation (Szabad Sajtó Alapítvány)(26%), First Hungarian Investment Fund (16.8%), Editorial Staff Association (6%) (1990-2005); Ringier (2014-2016); Vienna Capital Partners (2016) | Left, social democracy | nol.hu (now works as an archive) |
| Magyar Idők | Hungarian | Both | 2015 | 2019 | Mediaworks | Right, conservatism | magyaridok.hu (now works as an archive) |
| Mai Nap | Hungarian | Both | 1989 | 2005 | Hírlapkiadó Vállalat | Tabloid | mainap.hu (now works as a news aggregator site) |
| Pesti Hírlap | Hungarian | Print | 1841 | 1849 | Lajos Kossuth | Left, national liberalism | - |
| Pesti Hírlap | Hungarian | Print | 1878 | 1944 | Légrády Brothers | Right, conservatism | - |
| Pesti Hírlap | Hungarian | Print | 1990 | 1994 | István Varga | Right, conservatism | - |
| Pesti Hírlap | Hungarian | Both | 2020 | 2022 | Brit Media | Centre, liberalism | - |
| Szabad Nép | Hungarian | Print | 1942 | 1956 | Hungarian Working People's Party | Far-left, communism | - |
| The Budapest Beacon | English | Online | 2013 | 2018 | Real Reporting Foundation | Left, liberalism | budapestbeacon.com |
| Új Magyarország | Hungarian | Print | 1991 | 1997 | Hungarian Democratic Forum | Right, conservatism | - |
| Világgazdaság | Hungarian | Both | 1969 | 2022 | Mediaworks | Right, conservatism | vg.hu (still operating) |
| vs.hu | Hungarian | Online | 2013 | 2019 | New Wave Media Group | Right, conservatism | vs.hu (now works as an archive) |
| zoom.hu | Hungarian | Online | 2017 | 2018 | STRAT-POL | Left, liberalism | zoom.hu (now works as an archive) |

== Weekly ==
| Title | Language | Print/Online | Est. | Ceased | Owner | Orientation | Link |
|---|---|---|---|---|---|---|---|
| 168 Óra | Hungarian | Both | 1989 | 2022 | Brit Media | Left, liberalism | 168.hu (still operating) |
| Figyelő | Hungarian | Both | 1957 | 2022 | Mediaworks | Right, conservatism | figyelo.hu (still operating) |
| Helyi Téma | Hungarian | Both | 2004 | 2013 | Tamás Vitézy | Right, conservatism | helyitema.hu (not works) |
| Heti Válasz | Hungarian | Both | 2001 | 2018 | Lajos Simicska | Centre, conservatism | valasz.hu (now works as an archive) |
| Hétfői Hírek | Hungarian | Print | 1957 | 1985 | Hírlapkiadó Vállalat | Far-left, communism | - |
| Jelen | Hungarian | Both | 2020 | 2022 | Liberty Press | Left, liberalism | jelen.media (still operating) |
| Ludas Matyi | Hungarian | Print | 1945 | 1992 | Hírlapkiadó Vállalat | Far-left, political satirical magazine | - |
| Magyar Hírmondó | Hungarian | Print | 1780 | 1788 | Ferenc Ágoston Patzkó | Independent | - |
| The Budapest Sun | English | Print | 1993 | 2009 | Associated Newspapers of Great Britain | Independent | - |
| Vasárnapi Hírek | Hungarian | Both | 1985 | 2018 | XXI. század Média Kft. | Left, social democracy | vasarnapihirek.hu (not works) |

== Biweekly ==
- Magyar Jelen

== Telephone news ==
- Telefon Hírmondó, the longest-running telephone newspaper

== See also ==
- List of newspapers in Hungary
- Media of Hungary
