= Talk im Turm =

German political talk show

- Presented by: Florian Fischer-Fabian; Heidi Schüller; Erich Böhme; Sandra Maischberger; Gero von Boehm; Stefan Aust
- Country of origin: Germany
- Original language: German

Production
- Producer: Sat.1
- Production locations: Bonn; Berlin

Original release
- Release: 7 January 1990 – 1999

Talk im Turm was a weekly talk show that dealt with political and social topics, primarily with a focus on Germany. Mostly German politicians or public figures were invited. The talk was broadcast on Sundays at 22:00 in the length of one hour. It was produced for Sat.1 first in Bonn and later in Berlin and ran for almost a decade from 1990 to 1999.

== Overview ==
In 1990 Florian Fischer-Fabian and Heidi Schüller presented the show together, in the course of the year they were replaced by Erich Böhme and Sandra Maischberger. Maischberger left the programme after a year.

Erich Böhme remained the main moderator for eight years. In 1998, Sat.1 director Fred Kogel did not see how Böhme could fit into the then new, youthful concept of the station. For example, Böhme hosted the last Talk im Turm programme for the Bundestag elections on 27 September 1998 at the age of 68. Already at the end of 1997 Böhme became co-host of the programme Der Grüne Salon at Heinz Eggert's side at the n-tv news channel. From 2000, Böhme continued a similar broadcasting format with Talk in Berlin.

Who would succeed Böhme at Sat.1 was unclear for a long time. Finally, Der Spiegel editor-in-chief Stefan Aust took over the programme and moderated Talk im Turm from the end of 1998 to the beginning of 1999, during which time further political programmes such as Sabine Christiansen, with which the Sat.1 format was in competition, were established in the public broadcasters (ARD/ZDF). At the beginning of 1999, the production of Talk im Turm was discontinued on Sat.1 after nine years of broadcasting due to a lack of viewer response and poor feature-literature reviews.

In 2002 there was another short comeback of the show. On the occasion of the Bundestag elections, Erich Böhme presented five programmes entitled Talk im Turm – Spezial zur Wahl, which were broadcast every Monday from 26 August to 23 September at 12:15. Günther Jauch and Harald Schmidt were guests in the last programme.

The news magazine Der Spiegel reported in its issue of 10 May 2010 that Sat.1 wanted to re-release Talk im Turm with Hans Werner Kilz as presenter. On December 15, 2010, however, kress.de announced that Helmut Markwort should anchor Talk im Turm. After both cancelled, Claus Strunz and Hajo Schumacher were in discussion as moderators. Sat.1 finally decided against a new edition of Talk im Turm. Instead, a political talk show with a new concept has been broadcast since 21 March 2011. This was titled Eins gegen Eins which was present by Claus Strunz and ran until 2013.

== Presenters ==
- Florian Fischer-Fabian (1990)
- Heidi Schüller (1990)
- Erich Böhme (1990–1998)
- Sandra Maischberger (1991)
- Gero von Boehm (1991)
- Stefan Aust (1998–1999)
