= Talk in Berlin =

- Presented by: Erich Böhme; Klaus Bresser
- Country of origin: (Germany)
- Original language: German

Production
- Producer: n-tv
- Production location: Berlin
- Running time: 90 min

Original release
- Release: 6 February 2000 – 15 December 2003

Talk in Berlin was a weekly talk show on the German news channel n-tv hosted by Erich Böhme and Klaus Bresser.

Exactly one year after the end of Talk im Turm, its long-time presenter Erich Böhme returned to television with an almost identical show on the news channel n-tv. He talked with four to five guests each about a current political topic. The program was 90 minutes long and ran on Sundays from 9.30 pm.

n-tv stopped the show at the end of 2003 due to financial reasons, but also program optimization would have played a role in this decision.

== Hosts ==
- Erich Böhme (2000–2002)
- Klaus Bresser (2002–2003)
