= Deutsche Kinemathek =

Film and television museum and archive in Berlin, Germany

Deutsche Kinemathek – Museum für Film und Fernsehen
- Deutsche Kinemathek
- Logo

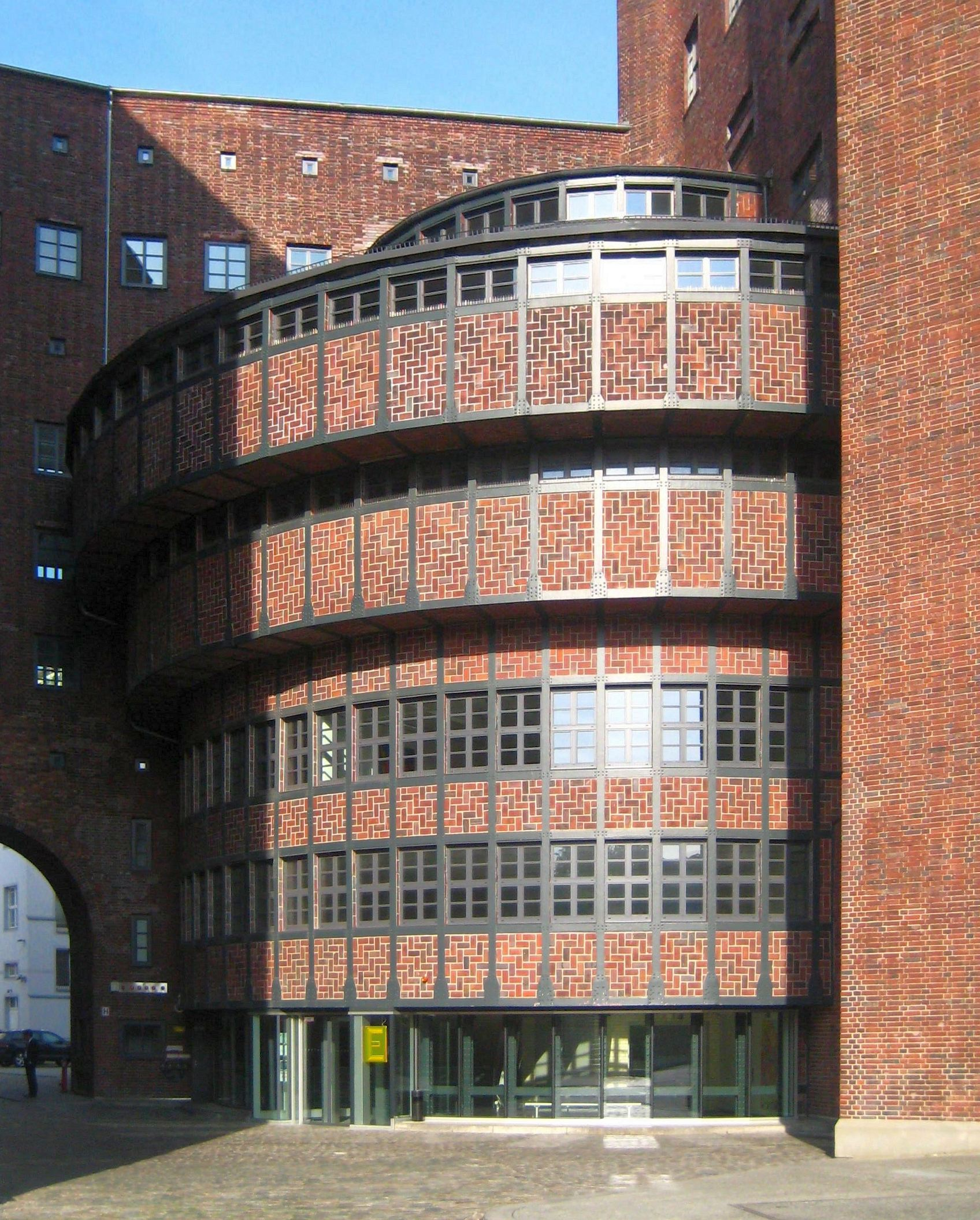
- Entrance of the Deutsche Kinemathek in Berlin

- Location in Berlin
- Former name: Deutsche Kinemathek e. V.
- Established: 1963; 63 years ago
- Location: Mauerstraße 79, 10117 Berlin, Germany
- Coordinates: 52°30′30.9″N 13°23′13.9″E
- Type: Film museum and Television museum
- Key holdings: Extensive German and international film and television collections
- Collections: Film, television, photography, and archival documents
- Collection size: Over 1 million items
- Founder: Deutsche Kinemathek e. V.
- Directors: Heleen Gerritsen (Artistic Director); Florian Bolenius (Administrative Director)
- Owner: Foundation under German civil law
- Public transit access: · Stadtmitte; Anton-Wilhelm-Amo-Straße; Berlin Potsdamer Platz; Unter den Linden station; Several Berlin buses
- Website: deutsche-kinemathek.de

The Deutsche Kinemathek – Museum für Film und Fernsehen Berlin (English: "German Cinematheque – Museum of Film and Television Berlin") is a German film archive based in Berlin, Germany, that makes a significant contribution to the preservation and dissemination of German and international film heritage. Since 2006, the Kinemathek has also made German television accessible to the public via its Television Collection. In 2025 it relocated to a new temporary location at E-Werk, having previously been located at Potsdamer Platz.

== History ==
=== Mission and Purpose ===
The Stiftung Deutsche Kinemathek has set itself the task of documenting and researching the history of film and television and promoting scholarly and educational discussions. It is dedicated to collecting and preserving valuable film material, including materials of significant importance in film and television history, and promotes the dissemination of audiovisual heritage through its own exhibitions, publications, educational programs, film series, and other events. It is supported as an institution by the Federal Government Commissioner for Culture and the Media.

=== Film Archiving, Restoration, and the Festival "Film Restored" ===
Among the central tasks of the Deutsche Kinemathek are to archive, reconstruct and restore films of historical significance. With approximately 26,000 titles, the Film Archive comprises an extensive collection of German and international silent and sound films of various formats, genres and styles. Numerous films in the archive are available for viewing. Part of the film collection focuses on experimental and documentary films. In addition, numerous works from the signatories of the Oberhausen Manifesto of 1962 are in the archive, as well as the entire film output of the DFFB, which includes the explicitly political films of the first generation as well as the films of the Berlin School. Another focus is on the restoration and digitization of classic film titles. Since 2019, this work has been supported by the Film Heritage Funding Program (FFE), which is jointly funded by the federal government, the states and the German Federal Film Board (FFA). In 2022 alone, 36 film titles from the audiovisual collection of the Deutsche Kinemathek were restored. Since 2016, the Kinemathek has hosted the film heritage festival Film Restored, which presents newly digitized and restored films from film archives and film heritage institutions.

==== Worldwide Film Loans and Streaming Services ====
The films from the archives of the Deutsche Kinemathek are loaned to cinemas, museums and festivals. Every day, somewhere in the world, films from the cinema's rental collection are shown, the most frequently shown being 'Drei Haselnüsse für Aschenbrödel' (Three Wishes for Cinderella). As a distributor, the Kinemathek also oversees the productions of the German Film and Television Academy Berlin (DFFB). Its own streaming platform rounds off the services.

==== Berlinale Retrospective and Classics ====
Since 1977, the SDK has also been in charge of the Retrospective, the film history program of the Berlin International Film Festival (Berlinale). Since 2013, it has also curated the Berlinale Classics section, which focuses specifically on the digital restoration of classic films. Films in these sections have been screened at the Zeughauskino (an archive film cinema specialising in retrospectives; from 2023 within the Deutsches Historisches Museum at Unter den Linden 2) and the CinemaxX Potsdamer Platz.

=== Memberships and Partnerships ===
In addition to FIAF and the Kinematheksverbund (Association of German Cinematheques), the Deutsche Kinemathek is a member of various national and international associations and networks, including the Arbeitskreis selbständiger Kultur-Institute e. V. (AsKI), the Association des Cinémathèques Européennes (ACE), the Federal Association of Museum Education (Bundesverband Museumspädagogik e. V.), the German Museums Association (DM), the International Council of Museums (ICOM), the Berlin Museum's Association e. V. (BeMu) and the Network of Mediatheks.

Other cooperation partners include the Sunrise Foundation for Education and the Arts, as well as various television partners such as ARD, ZDF and the Grimme Institute.

=== Leadership and Staff ===
The Stiftung Deutsche Kinemathek employs between 60 and 100 people, and these figures fluctuate over longer periods. After the death of long-time director Heinz Rathsack at the end of 1989, the film historian Hans Helmut Prinzler took over the management of the Kinemathek in 1990. In 2006, Rainer Rother was appointed Artistic Director. Until March 2012, Paul Klimpel served as Administrative Director, followed by Maximilian Müllner until 2017. Florian Bolenius has been the Administrative Director since August 2017. Since June 2025, he, together with Heleen Gerritsen, the former director of the GoEast Film Festival in Wiesbaden, has chaired the board of the Deutsche Kinemathek – Museum for Film and Television.

== Collections and Personal Papers ==
Throughout their production history, films leave behind a wide variety of materials: three-dimensional sculptures and models, textiles, film-technical equipment, sound recordings, photographs, including scene, portrait and work photos, but also written documents such as scripts, draft sketches, contracts, posters, film programs, censorship documents, filmographic and biographical materials, advertisements, tickets and reviews. The Deutsche Kinemathek holds around one million materials relevant to film history in its collections and has audiovisual materials on 75,000 film titles. An international focus of the collection is the documents on tracing the work of German filmmakers in exile, which is considered the most comprehensive collection of its kind worldwide.

The Personal Papers and Company Archives hold the pre-mortem bequests and estates of more than 600 filmmakers from all professional groups in the film and television industry. The archive of production designer Sir Ken Adam alone comprises more than 6,000 drawings and sketches. In addition to this, the Personal Papers and Company Archives contain over 160,000 sheets of correspondence from Hollywood agent Paul Kohner. Collections from the estates and bequests of influential film legends such as F.W. Murnau, G.W. Pabst, Fritz Lang, Marlene Dietrich, Ulrike Ottinger, Werner Herzog, Fatih Akin, and Bernd Eichinger also offer extensive insight into individual biographies, cultural, contemporary, and production history.

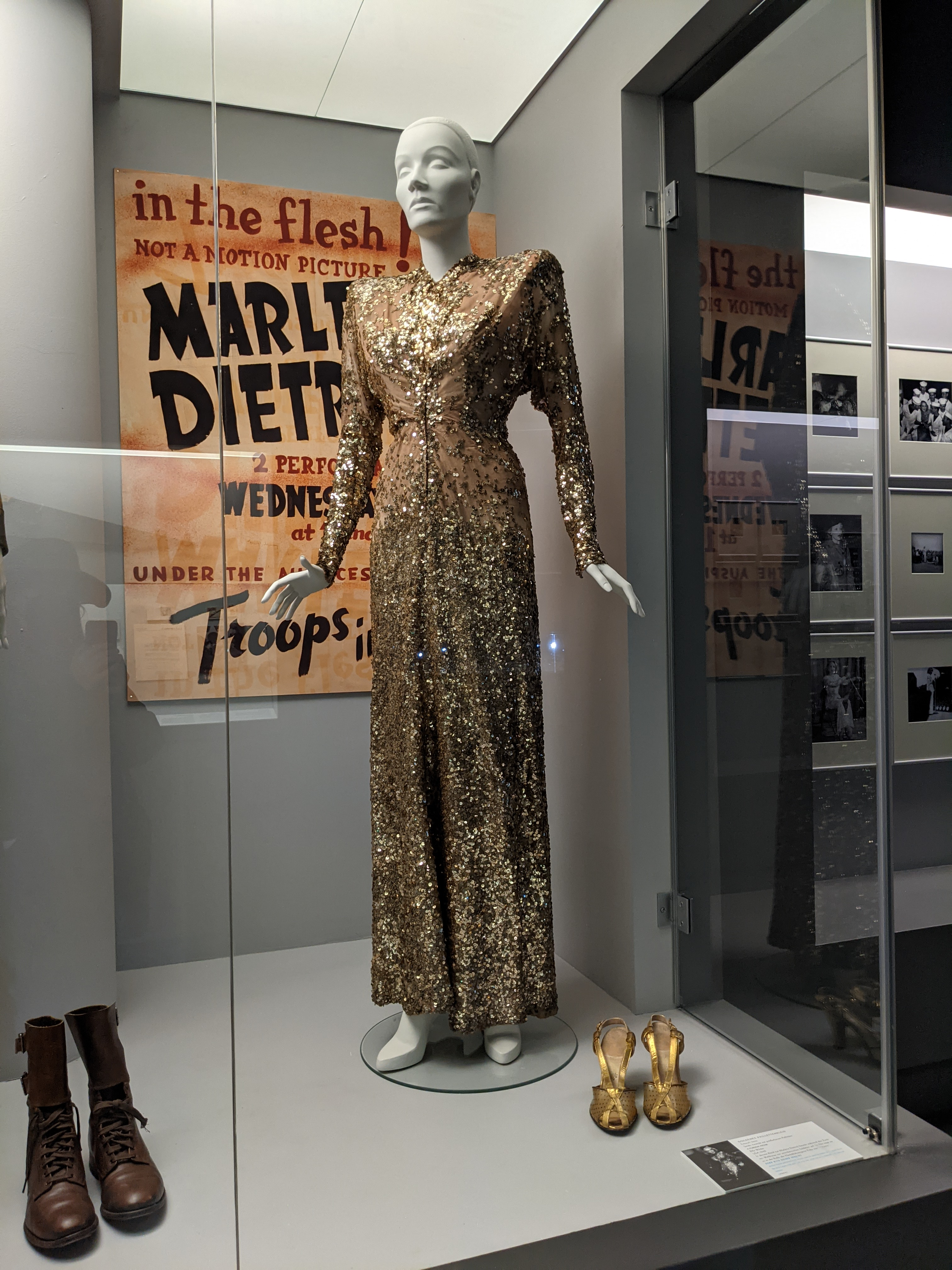
Marlene Dietrich's golden sequin dress from the film "A Foreign Affair" (Billy Wilder, USA 1948) is part of the Marlene Dietrich Collection in the Museum of Film and Television. This archive comprises over 300,000 sheets of documents from Dietrich's private and professional life, including more than 45,000 items of correspondence, 16,500 photographs, and over 3,300 textile objects, which can be accessed in the archive of the Deutsche Kinemathek.

=== Film Architecture, Costumes, Graphics, and Photography ===
A special focus of the collection is on materials relating to film architecture and costume design. The Textile Archive comprises more than 5,500 individual objects, of which around 3,200 belong to the Marlene Dietrich Collection. The Graphics Archive stores costume and production designs for around 1,400 film and theatre projects, including more than 28,000 film posters. The Photo Archive contains around one million analog photographs, slides, negatives and digital images, including material on around 45,000 film titles and 15,000 people. Archive materials relating to the films "The Cabinet of Dr. Caligari" and "Metropolis" are in particularly high demand. The Document Archive stores material on 72,500 film titles and more than 20,000 screenplays.

=== Television Collection ===
The Television Collection offers an overview of television in both German states and the unified Federal Republic. Currently, more than 13,000 programs (as of 2024) are stored in a database and are available in full length to Kinemathek visitors. Highlights include the Grimme Prize archive, the complete collection of "Tatort" and "Polizeiruf 110" in all editions, and an extensive selection from the premiere interview show "0137" with journalist Roger Willemsen.

=== Digital Access to the Archives ===
Since 2024, the holdings of the Deutsche Kinemathek can be researched online on its website and are therefore accessible to the general public. Where rights permit, digital copies can be viewed and borrowed directly. Some outstanding collections, such as those of director Werner Herzog, the production archive of Känguruh Film, or the collection of Josef Fenneker's expressionist posters, are also presented and contextualized on the website. The archive of set designer Ken Adam and the archive of the German Film and Television Academy Berlin (DFFB) can also be accessed online.

== Founding and Early Years ==
On 1 February 1963, the Deutsche Kinemathek, which was founded as a registered association on 6 April 1962, was officially opened with a ceremony at the Akademie der Künste (Academy of Arts). The foundation was laid by two collections purchased by the Berlin Senate, which the State of Berlin then entrusted to the association for administration and preservation. The first was the extensive collection of director Gerhard Lamprecht, which included a large stock of films, documents, materials and film-technical equipment, and the second was the collection of Albert Fidelius, a descendant of a film distributor, who had collected short feature films, newsreels and documentaries in the mid-1920s. Gerhard Lamprecht became the first director of the Deutsche Kinemathek e. V. After his retirement in 1966, the lawyer Heinz R. Berg managed the Kinemathek until 1970. From the outset, the association's goal was to establish a film museum, with financial assistance from the German federal government and the state of Berlin.

=== Moves and Locations in Berlin ===
After being temporarily housed in various locations in Berlin (from 1962 at Einsteinufer 43–53, and from 1966 at Schlüterstraße 41) and after its conversion to a foundation under private law on 1 February 1971, the Deutsche Kinemathek moved to the Deutschlandhaus on Pommernallee 1 in 1971, where the German Film and Television Academy had been based since 1966. After another temporary residency on Heerstraße 18–20 from 1996 on, the Kinemathek moved into new premises at the Sony Center on Potsdamer Straße 2 in 2000.

It represents one of the most significant film history collections in Europe, created through purchases, exchanges and donations. The Kinemathek participates in the national and international exchange of film copies and specialist knowledge, which was demonstrated by its accession to the Fédération Internationale des Archives du Film (FIAF) in 1965 and was further confirmed in 1979 by its membership of the Kinemathekenverbund (Association of German Cinematheques), a contractually regulated association of German film archives.

== Exhibitions and Public Programs ==
The Deutsche Kinemathek organized its first exhibitions in the 1960s at its location on Schlüterstraße in Berlin-Charlottenburg. However, larger exhibition spaces were initially not available and were instead presented in other venues. To mark Berlin's 750th anniversary in 1987, an exhibition ("...Film...City...Cinema...Berlin...") by the Deutsche Kinemathek took place in the former Hotel Esplanade, close to the Berlin Wall. At that time, it was originally planned to establish a film house together with several institutions (including the Stiftung Deutsche Kinemathek, the Friends of the Deutsche Kinemathek and the German Film and Television Academy Berlin) at this location. The major exhibition marking Ufa's 75th anniversary – "Die Ufa 1917–1945. Das deutsche Bilderimperium" (The Ufa from 1917–1945. The German Empire of the Moving Image) – was implemented in cooperation with the German Historical Museum (DHM) and exhibited on its premises in the Zeughaus. The exhibition "Kino – Movie – Cinema", conceived to mark the 100th anniversary of the medium of film, was also realized at a partner venue, the Martin-Gropius-Bau.

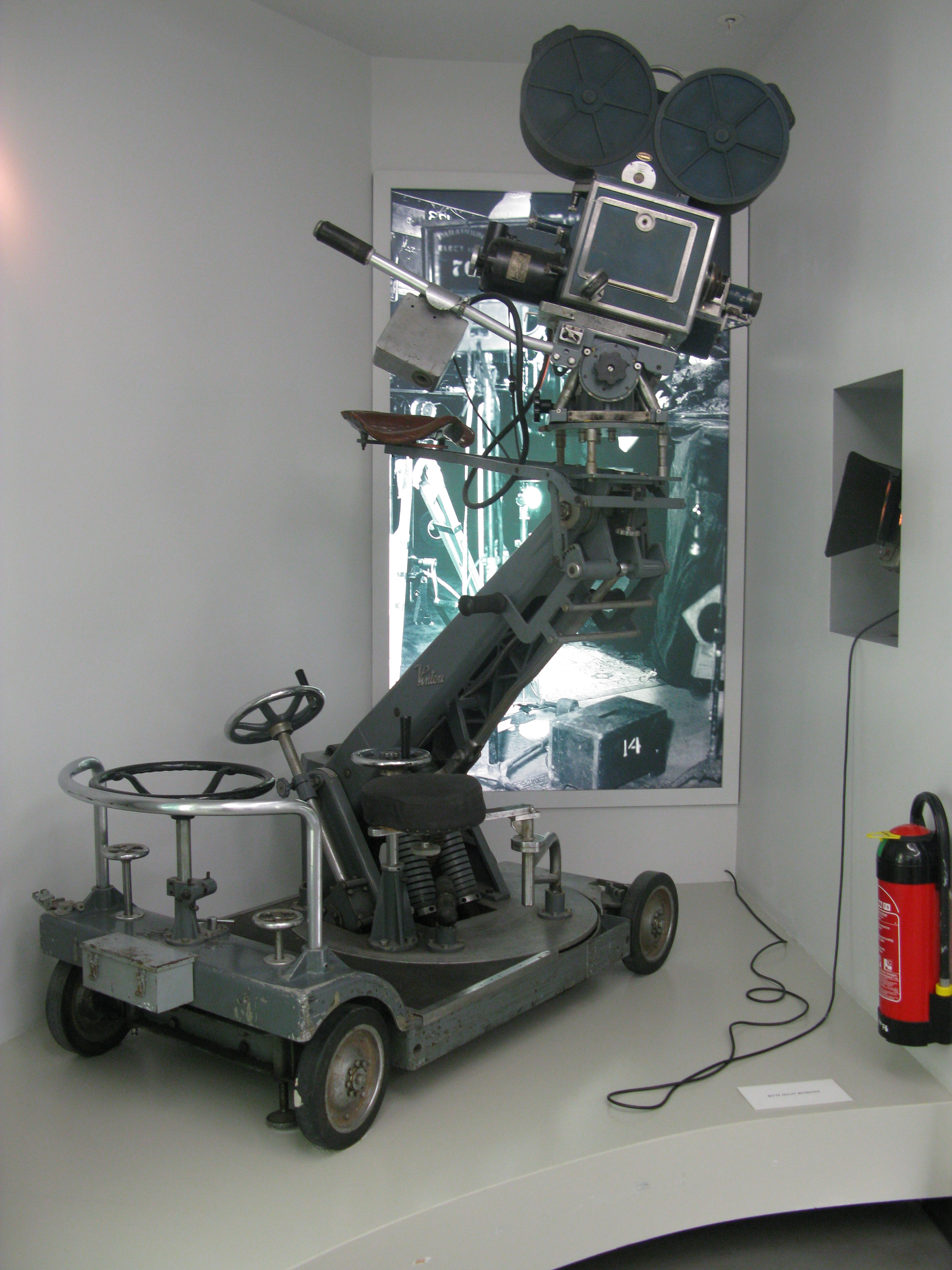
Movie camera on a dolly

With the move into the Filmhaus on Potsdamer Platz, the Deutsche Kinemathek opened the Filmmuseum Berlin in September 2000. From then on, a permanent Film and Television exhibition designed by architect Hans Dieter Schaal presented holdings from the archives and special exhibitions were also curated. The permanent exhibition presented German film and television history in all its glory, showcasing posters, costumes, props and highlights such as Marlene Dietrich's personal collection and set designs for Metropolis. Items from renowned directors such as Werner Herzog and Georg Stefan Troller were also on display. Highlights included original set designs from Fritz Lang's futuristic Metropolis (1927) and the naval uniforms worn in Wolfgang Petersen's acclaimed war film Das Boot (1981).

In 2006, the museum was expanded to include a television exhibition and was renamed Deutsche Kinemathek – Museum for Film and Television. This was also in line with the change in the institution's financing, which, following the revision of the agreement on cultural funding derived from Berlin's status as the capital city on 9 December 2003, has been funded exclusively by the federal government since 2004.

On 31 October 2024, the permanent exhibition of the Deutsche Kinemathek at Potsdamer Platz closed. The institution, with its library, collections, and archives, moved to the nearby E-Werk in January 2025, where parts of the exhibition will be presented in smaller interim quarters starting in autumn 2025. The closure took place as part of planned renovation work at the Sony Center.

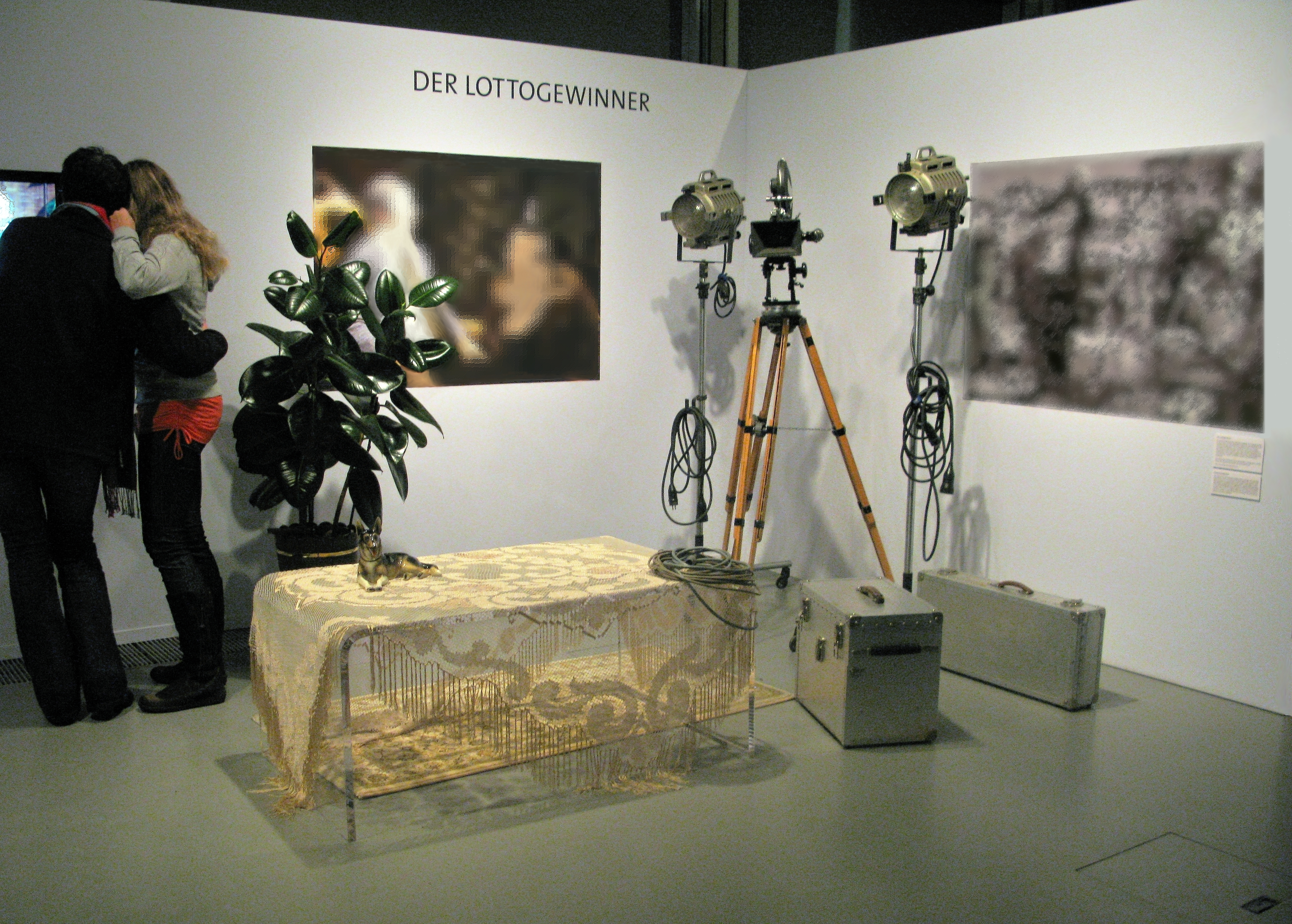
The exhibition "Loriot – Vicco von Bülow zum 85. Geburtstag" (Loriot – Vicco von Bülow on the occasion of his 85th birthday) attracted more than 100,000 visitors in 2008.

=== Publications and Research ===
Since its beginnings, the Deutsche Kinemathek has published publications – primarily on German film and its history – including specialist journals such as 'Recherche Film und Fernsehen' and 'FilmExil' (both discontinued). Previous publication series included the 'FilmHefte' and the 'Film-Kurier-Index' published jointly with CineGraph, the book series 'FILMtext' and the 'FilmMaterialien' brochures. In 2010, on the occasion of the new restoration of the film classic, the book 'Fritz Langs Metropolis' was published, containing over 600 illustrations. Catalogs accompanying exhibitions and the Berlinale Retrospectives are regularly published. Publications to accompany conferences are released on topics such as the changing cinematic portrayal of the dictator Adolf Hitler, the role of film in the First and Second World Wars, the development of genre films in Germany, or an exploration of the work of Werner Herzog. The series "Film und Schrift" is dedicated to important film critics. "Fernsehen – Geschichte – Ästhetik" (Television – History – Aesthetics) examines the television work of individual actors as well as overarching aspects such as the early history of the film company Degeto (Deutsche Gesellschaft für Ton und Bild e. V), which was important for television. Individual publications documenting the holdings of the SDK's collections have been released, most recently "Der deutsche Film. Aus den Archiven der Deutschen Kinemathek" (German Film. From the Archives of the Deutsche Kinemathek.)

=== Interview Series "Fernsehsalon" ===
The interview series "Fernsehsalon" examines the programming mandate of television. In conversations with host Klaudia Wick, guests talk about their motivation and attitude when pitching television programs. The spectrum ranges from war reporter Katrin Eigendorf to TV chef Tim Mälzer. The first guest was comedienne Maren Kroymann in December 2021.

== Specialized Library ==
The Kinemathek also houses one of the largest scholarly libraries specializing in film and television in Germany, with a collection of more than 95,000 bound works. The collection includes film and television history, including pre- and early history, film and television theory, biographies and film literature, as well as books on film and television economics and technology. Nearly 63,000 books and around 3,800 magazine titles are available, 131 of which are ongoing subscription titles. Historical film magazines can be viewed on 316 microfilm rolls. Filmographic and bibliographic databases, as well as 5,000 DVDs, are available for use on site. In addition, there are extensive special collections, including festival materials, cinema programs and distribution catalogs.

== Museum of Film and Television ==
The Deutsche Kinemathek opened in 1963. Until the opening of a permanent display in the Museum of Film and Television Berlin (Museum für Film und Fernsehen) on 1 June 2006, it was simply known as the Deutsche Kinemathek, after that date acquiring the second part of its name.

The Museum of Film and Television Berlin (Museum für Film und Fernsehen) opened in 2000 as part of the Deutsche Kinemathek at Potsdamer Straße 2 in Berlin. Part of the Deutsche Kinemathek's archived collection was exhibited at the "Filmhaus" on Potsdamer Platz until its closure at the end of 2024 ahead of its relocation. The permanent exhibition at the old location closed on 31 October 2024.

In January 2025 Deutsche Kinemathek opened in a new location, the E-Werk, an old power substation in Berlin-Mitte. The film archive open on 2 May 2025.

== See also ==
- List of film archives
