= Erich Böhme =

German journalist and television presenter

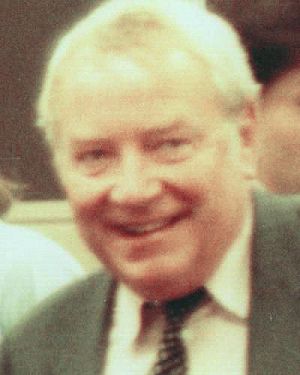
- Böhme in 1985
- Born: 2 February 1930; Frankfurt am Main, Weimar Republic
- Died: 27 November 2009 (aged 79); Bad Saarow, Brandenburg, Germany

Erich Böhme (8 February 1930 – 27 November 2009) was a German journalist and television presenter.

== Life and career ==
Böhme grew up in Frankfurt am Main. After school, he studied economics there and graduated with a degree in economics from the Goethe University Frankfurt. In 1953 he began as an agency journalist at the Vereinigte Wirtschaftsdienste and then moved to the Stuttgart-based Deutsche Zeitung und Wirtschaftszeitung. In 1958 he went to the news magazine Der Spiegel, where he first became a business correspondent in what was then the federal capital Bonn, where he became office manager in 1969. Böhme became editor-in-chief of Der Spiegel in 1973 when his friend and predecessor Günter Gaus switched to politics. At Der Spiegel, he was also responsible for reporting on the Barschel affair. Böhme himself described the revelations of Prime minister Barschel's then media spokesman Reiner Pfeiffer about the manipulations in Schleswig-Holstein's 1987 state election campaign as the highlight of his career.

On 30 October 1989, shortly before the opening of the Berlin Wall, Böhme published the commentary The opportunity is good. with the key phrase: I don't want to be reunited. Five years later he put this into perspective with the words: What devil may have ridden me when I wrote in the SPIEGEL five years ago 'I don't want to be reunited'?

After several disagreements with Rudolf Augstein, Böhme left Der Spiegel at the end of 1989 – shortly before his 60th birthday – after almost 17 years as editor-in-chief. From November 1990 he worked for four years as editor of the Berliner Zeitung, published by Gruner + Jahr and Robert Maxwell. Also from 1990 he hosted the political talk show Talk im Turm at Sat.1 for eight and a half years. Böhme moderated n-tv's Der Grüne Salon together with Heinz Eggert from the end of 1997, before returning to his initial TV format with Talk in Berlin. On 27 February 2007, Böhme moderated the programme Menschen bei Maischberger as a representative for Sandra Maischberger, who took a baby break of several weeks. Even after his time as editor of the Berliner Zeitung, he still worked as a print journalist. He wrote columns for the Berliner Zeitung, the Munich Abendzeitung and the Sächsische Zeitung. Besides, Böhme has been member of the Advisory Board of the Bertelsmann Stiftung from 1990 to 1993.

In his second marriage, Böhme was married to the former Der Spiegel cultural editor and later literary agent Monica Vogelgsang (died 1990), in his third marriage to her niece, the fashion designer Daniela Vogelgsang. Since August 2004 the former GDR news anchor Angelika Unterlauf was his fourth wife. He last lived with her in Worin in the Oderland region of Brandenburg. Böhme died on 27 November 2009 as a result of many years of cancer. Family, friends and representatives of politics and media took leave of Erich Böhme at a memorial service in the Kaiser Wilhelm Memorial Church on 14 December 2009. Former Foreign Minister Joschka Fischer praised Böhme as a "living history book of the old Federal Republic". For him, journalism was a defence of democracy. His grave is in the French Cemetery in Berlin.
