= György Aranka =

Hungarian writer (1737–1817)

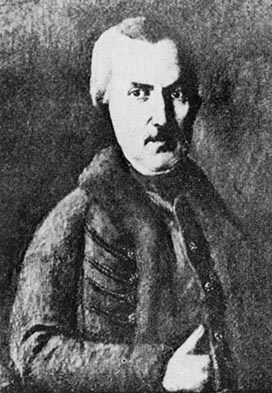
György Aranka

György Aranka (17 September 1737 – 11 March 1817) was a Hungarian writer.

== Biography ==
He was born in Szék (today Sic, Cluj), Szolnok-Doboka County, Principality of Transylvania. His father György Aranka Senior was the bishop of the Transylvanian Reformed Church.

He studied in Marosvásárhely (today Târgu Mureş in Romania) and Nagyenyed (today Aiud). For his civil profession he was a lawyer and started his career as a clerk, then worked in different positions in the courts of law of Marosvásárhely. In 1796, he became judge of the supreme court of Transylvania.

His activity was of very broad range and had a great importance in the Hungarian cultural history. He was an enthusiastic promoter of the Hungarian public education and the cultivation of the Hungarian language. His poems were published in the magazines Magyar Hírmondó (1780), Magyar Museum and Orpheus. During the 1791 session of the Transylvanian parliament, he established the a society for the cultivation of the Hungarian language in Transylvania, and was elected its secretary. In 1792, he organized the Old Manuscript Society for the publishing of old Transylvanian mémoires. He died in Marosvásárhely.
