= Strunz =

Strunz can refer to:

- Claudio Strunz (born 1966), Argentine drummer
- Claus Strunz (born 1966), German journalist
- Thomas Strunz, (born 1968), German soccer player
- Strunz classification in mineralogy
- Strunz & Farah, a band
