= Arsenal Filminstitut =

German film society

Arsenal Filminstitut e.V. is a Berlin-based, non-profit film society. It was founded in 1963 as Friends of the German Cinematheque (German: Freunde der Deutschen Kinemathek e.V.) to promote public access to world cinema and film history. The organisation opened the repertory cinema Arsenal in 1970 and launched the International Forum of New Cinema at the Berlin International Film Festival the following year. In 2008 it changed its name from Freunde der deutschen Kinemathek to Arsenal – Institut für Film und Videokunst e.V.; in January 2026 again to the short moniker Arsenal Filminstitut e.V.

== Foundation ==
Film historian Gero Gandert and the film critics Ulrich Gregor and Erika Gregor registered Friends of the German Cinematheque on 30 March 1963, seeking to make the newly established Deutsche Kinemathek’s collections and other rarely shown works accessible to the public. Before acquiring its own venue, the association programmed monthly screenings at the Akademie der Künste, premiering independent titles such as Adolfas Mekas’s Hallelujah the Hills for German audiences in 1964.

Using private loans and donations, the group purchased the disused Bayreuther Lichtspiele in Berlin-Schöneberg and reopened it on 3 January 1970 as the Arsenal, Germany’s first non-profit archive cinema. The cinema relocated to the Filmhaus on Potsdamer Platz in 2000, and on 1 November 2008 the association formally adopted the name Arsenal – Institut für Film und Videokunst e.V. to reflect its expanded archival and educational remit. In January 2026 it changed its name again to Arsenal Filminstitut e.V.

In 2025 the cinema and offices moved to the silent green Kulturquartier in the Berlin neighbourhood Wedding. The former crematorium is now a cultural center hosting concerts, discussions, literary events, film screenings, conferences and festivals. The new cinema Arsenal opened in May 2026 in the historical Westhalle (western hall) of the crematorium and features a hall with 169 seats, a 9 m x 4 m screen and Dolby Atmos sound system. It can project all analogue image formats from 8 mm to 70 mm and digitally up to 4K with its 4K DCP projector.

== Activities ==
Arsenal organises more than 400 screenings annually and administers a collection of about 9,000 film prints that is being digitised under the long-term “arsenal kollektion” project.
