= List of defunct newspapers =

List of defunct newspapers includes:

- List of defunct newspapers of Australia
- List of defunct newspapers of Canada
  - List of defunct newspapers of Quebec
- List of defunct newspapers of France
- List of defunct newspapers of Germany
- List of defunct newspapers of Hungary
- List of defunct newspapers of Norway
- List of defunct newspapers of Russia
- List of defunct newspapers of Turkey
- List of defunct newspapers of the United States
  - List of defunct newspapers of Hartford City, Indiana
  - List of defunct Massachusetts newspapers
  - List of defunct newspapers of North Carolina
