= János Csontos =

Hungarian writer

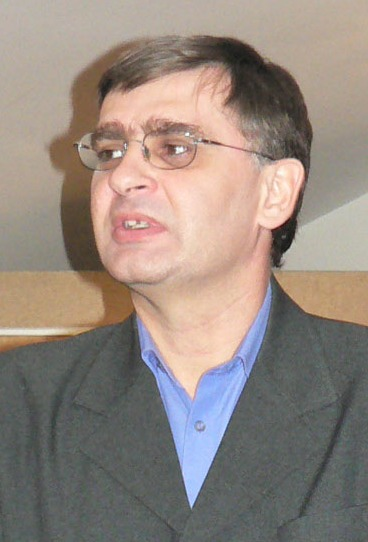
- Born: June 16, 1962; Ózd
- Died: December 4, 2017 (aged 55)
- Citizenship: Hungry
- Occupation(s): Writer, poet

János Csontos was a Hungarian writer and poet, recipient of the Attila József Prize, as well as a film director honored with the Károly Kós Prize.

== Career ==
Csontos began his career as a journalist at Debrecen University Life, and from 1987, he worked as a theater and film critic and cultural writer for Hajdú-Bihari Napló. Starting in 1992, he worked as a cultural columnist for Esti Hírlap. From 1994 to 2015, with brief interruptions, he was a publicist for Magyar Nemzet, where he also served as chief staff member between 2003 and 2009. In 2009, Csontos founded the literary weekly magazine Nagyítás, where he served as chief editor until 2010.

== Books of Poetry ==
- 1991: Menekült iratok
- 1991: Szabadulási mutatvány
- 1994: Határfolyam
- 1997: Szonettregény
- 1997: Szajnaparti szonettek
- 2002: XL (collected poems, 1980–2002)
- 2011: Delelő (collected poems, 2002–2010)
- 2014: Egy mondat a hazugságról
