= Sic, Cluj =

Sic Szék
- Commune
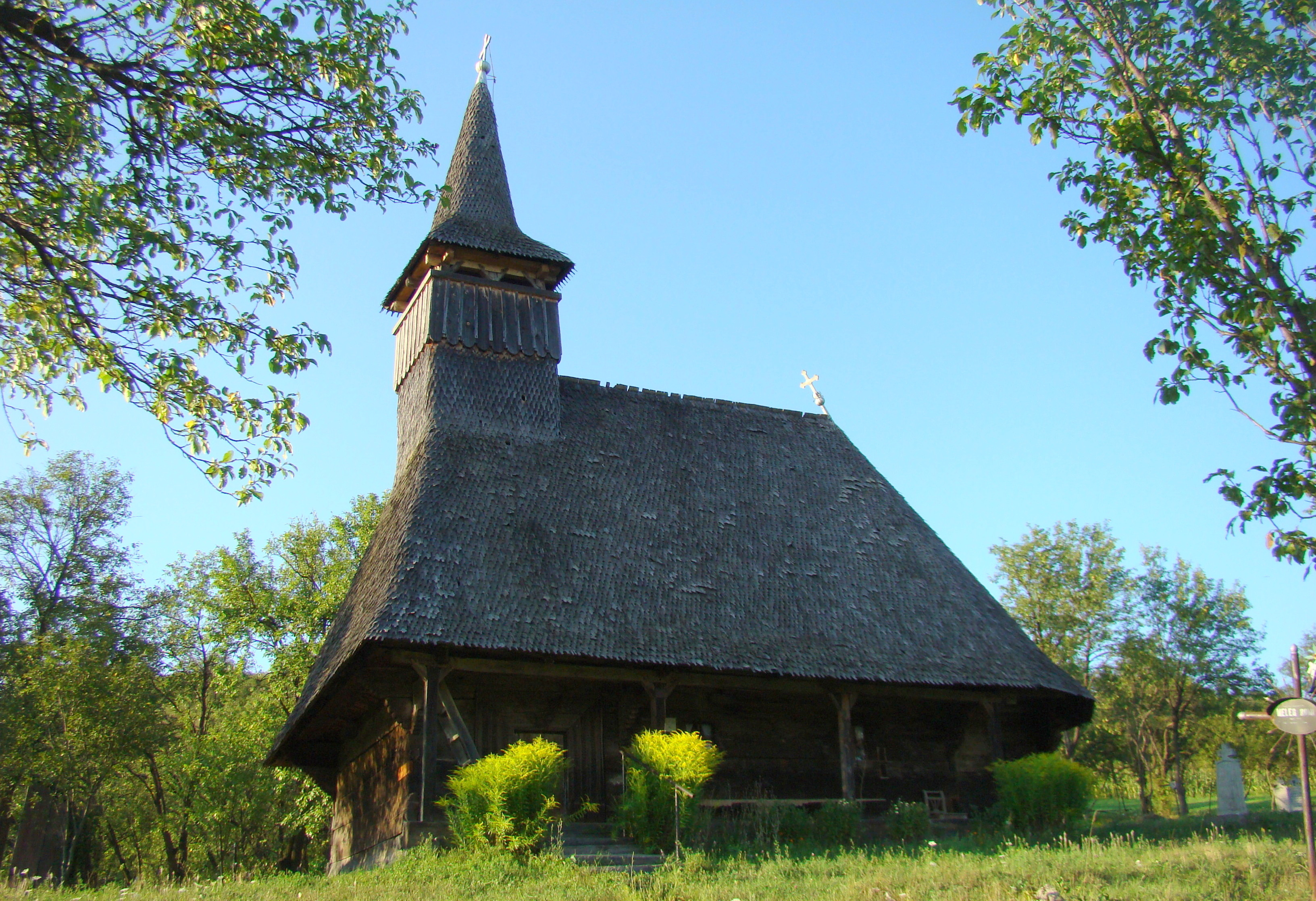
- The wooden church "The Holy Archangels Michael and Gabriel" from Sic

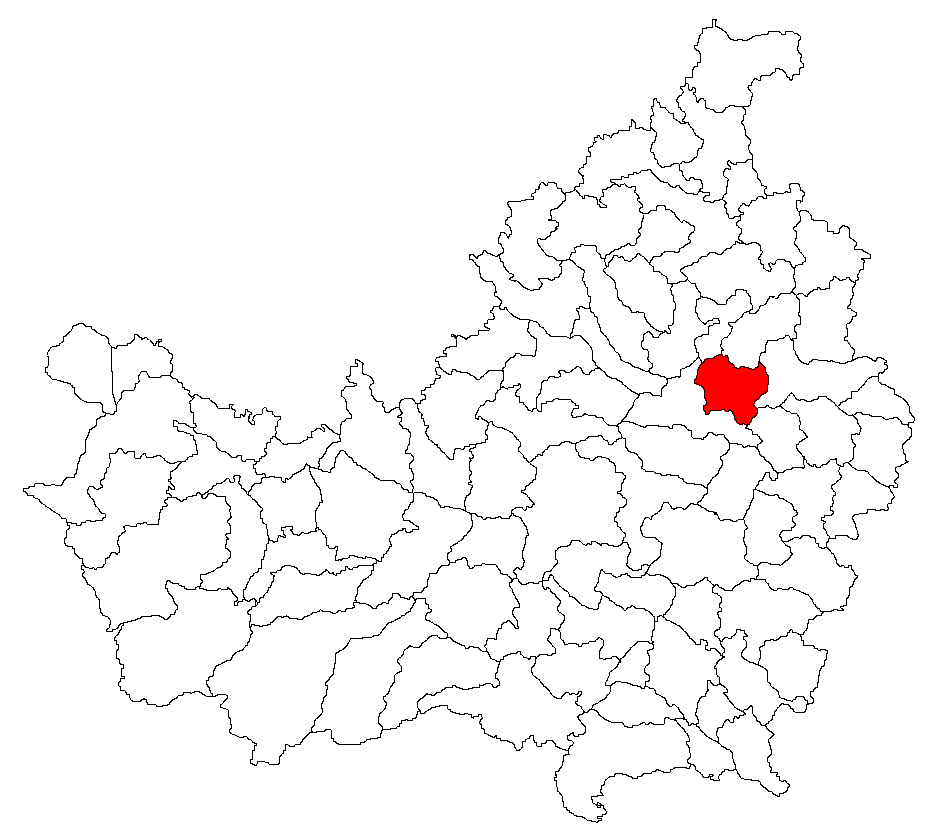
- Location in Cluj County

- Location in Romania
- Coordinates: 46°55′47″N 23°53′47″E
- Country: Romania
- County: Cluj

Government
  - Mayor (2020–2024): Ioan Sallai (Ind.)
- Area: 56.37 km^{2} (21.76 sq mi)
- Elevation: 294 m (965 ft)
- Population (2021-12-01): 2,234
  - Density: 39.63/km^{2} (102.6/sq mi)
- Time zone: UTC+02:00 (EET)
  - Summer (DST): UTC+03:00 (EEST)
- Postal code: 407540
- Area code: +40 x64
- Vehicle reg.: CJ
- Website: szek-sic.ro

Sic (Hungarian: Szék; German: Secken) is a commune in Cluj County, Transylvania, Romania. It is composed of a single village, Sic.

A former salt-mining town, the commune is located in the eastern part of the county, in the Transylvanian Plain, 15 km (9.3 mi) south of Gherla and 39 km (24 mi) northeast of the county seat, Cluj-Napoca.

== Demography ==
At the 2011 census, the commune had 2,459 inhabitants; 93.8% were Hungarians, 3.6% Romanians, and 0.4% Roma. At the 2002 census, 75% were Hungarian Reformed, 10% Seventh-day Adventists, 6.6% Roman Catholics, and 3.7% Romanian Orthodox. At the 2021 census, Sic had a population of 2,234; of those, 91,18% were Hungarians, 4.83% Romanians, and 1,3% Roma.

== Natives ==
- György Aranka (1737–1817), Hungarian writer

== Gallery ==
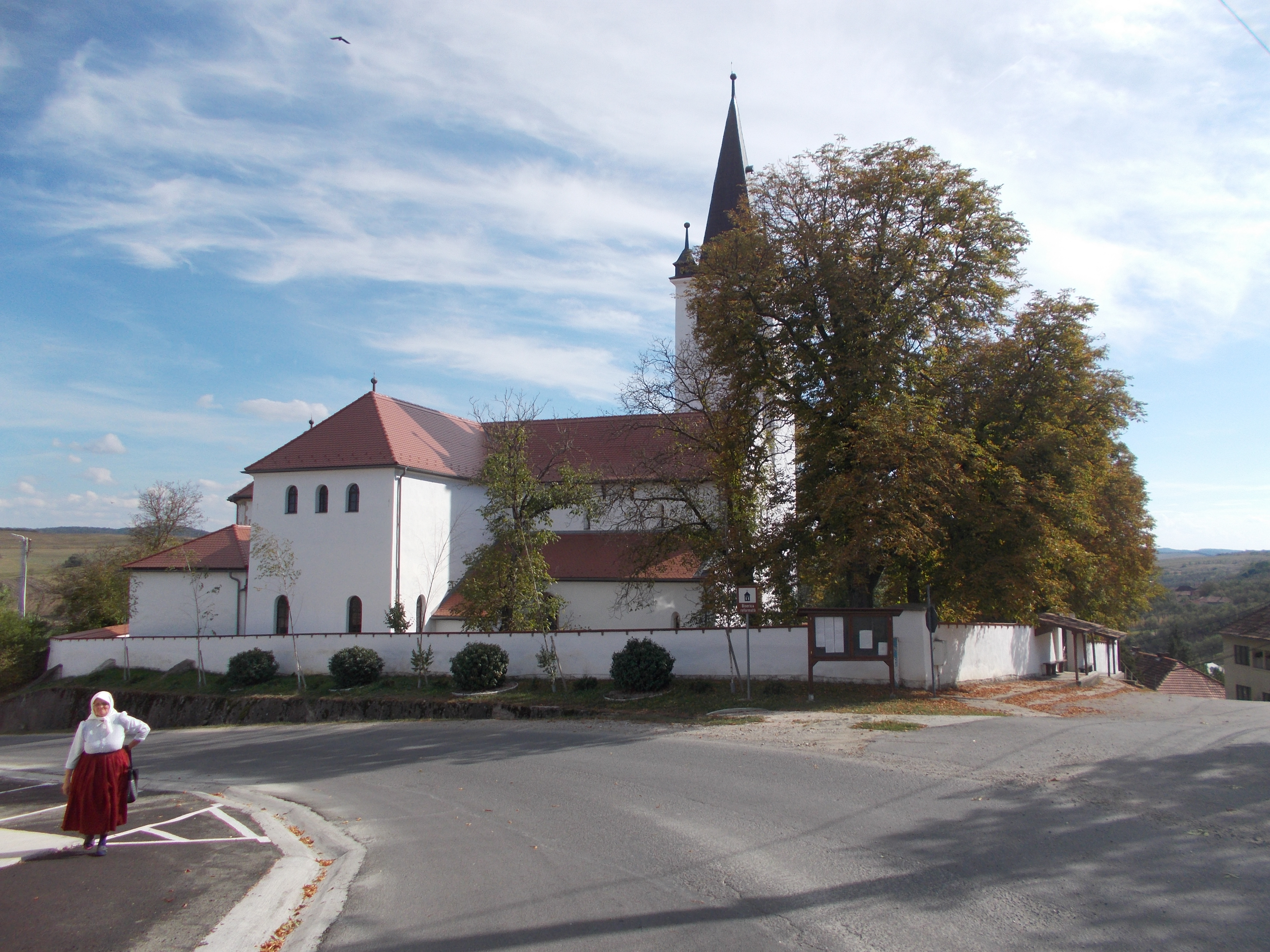
Reformed church

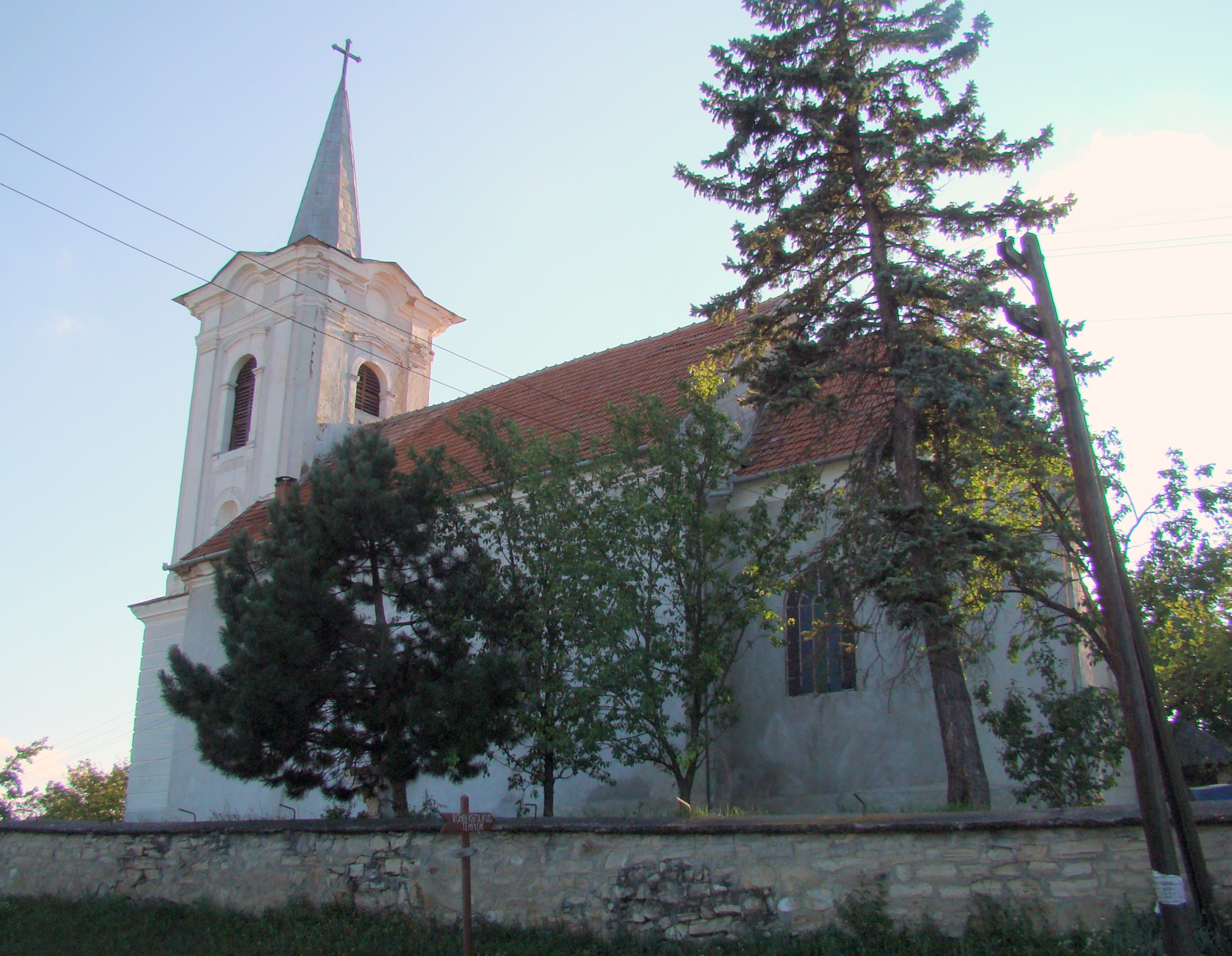
Franciscan monastery church

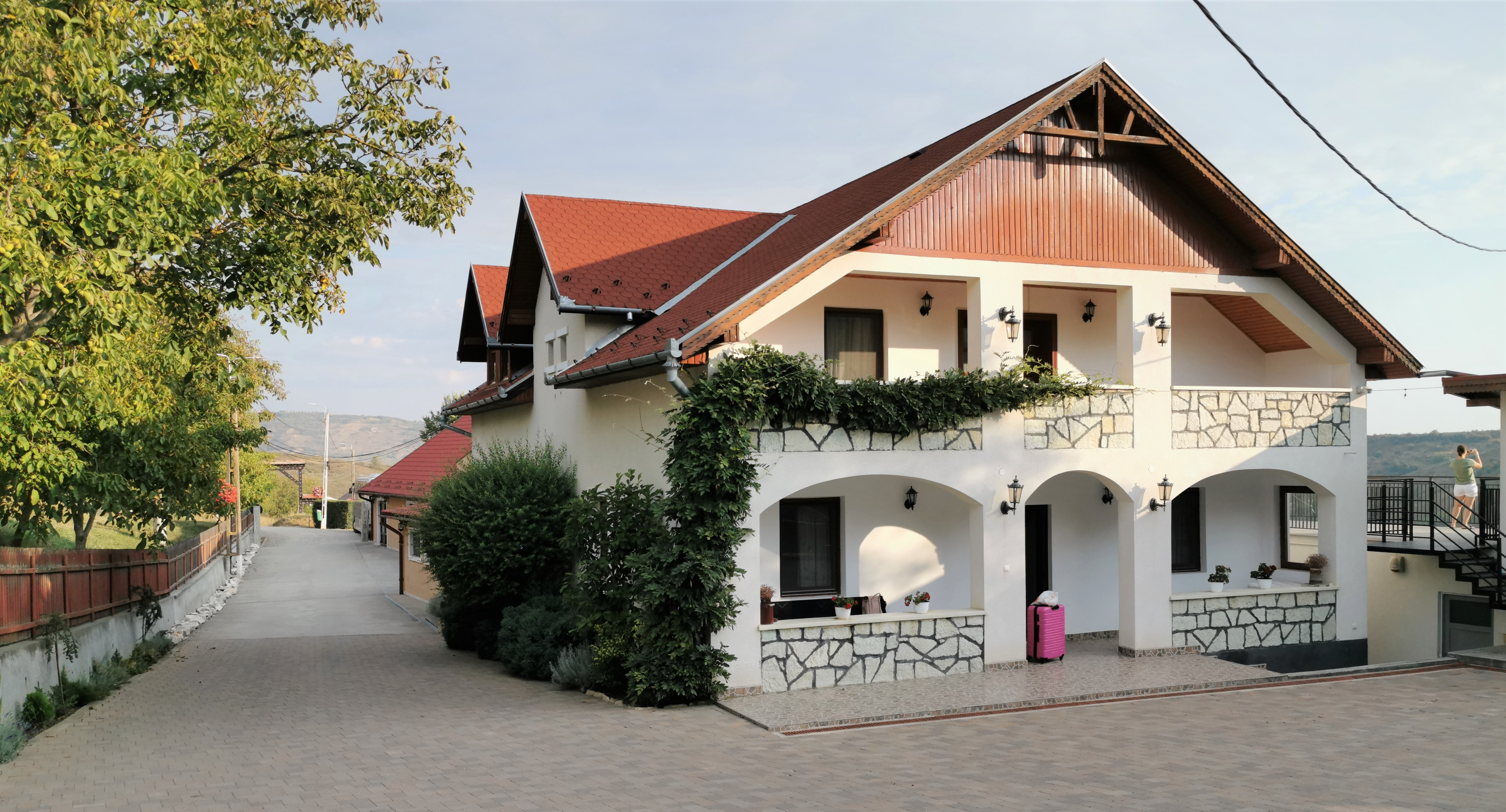
Sóvirág Inn

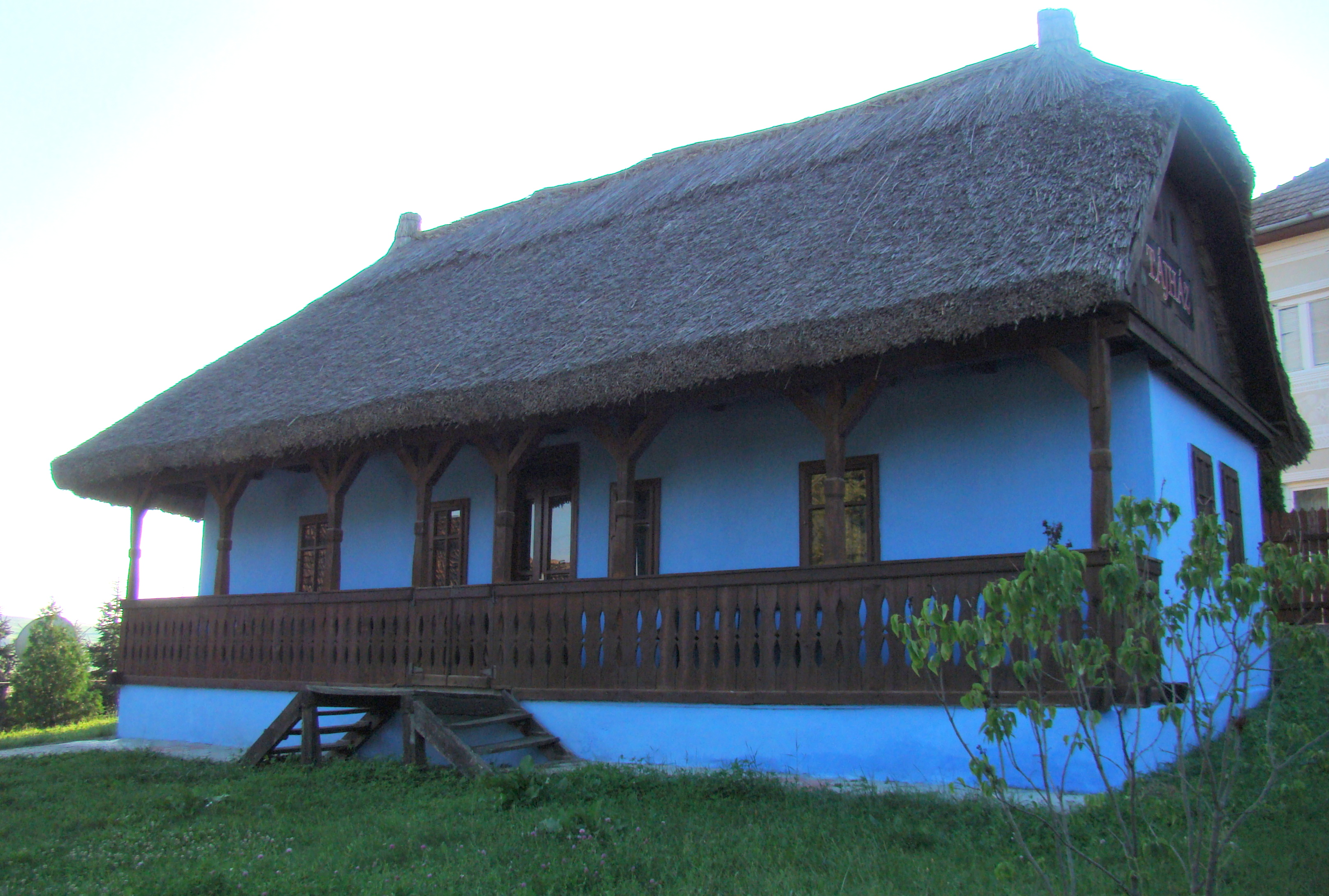
House in Sic
