= 0137 =

German television talk show, 1991–1994

- Genre: Talk show
- Starring: Roger Willemsen, Sandra Maischberger, Hubert Winkels and Sabine Brandi
- Country of origin: Germany

Production
- Running time: 45 min

Original release
- Network: Premiere
- Release: 1991 – 1993

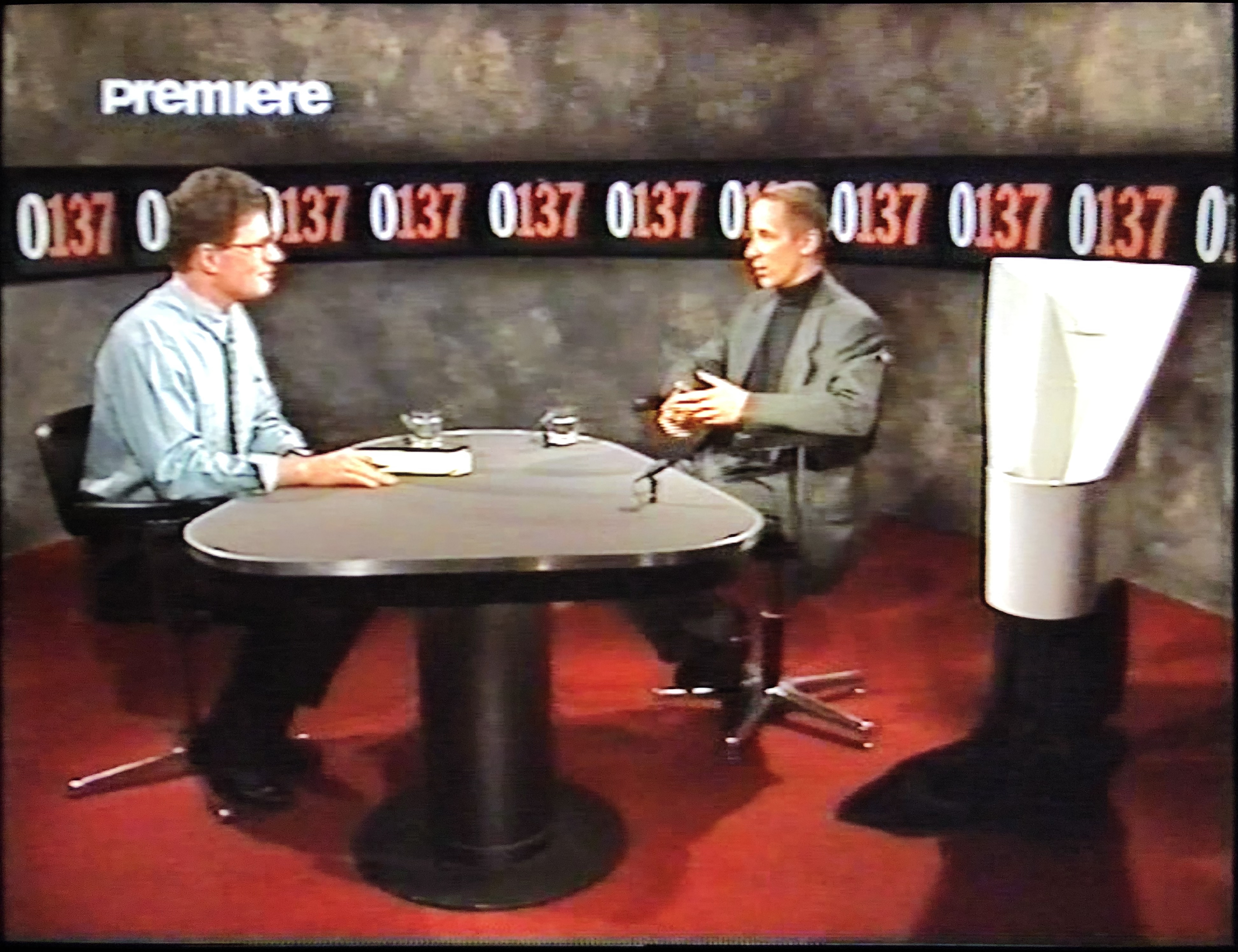
Roger Willemsen interviewing Martin Rendel. Talkshow 0137. Premiere

0137 was a live-broadcast German talk show. It was broadcast between 1991 and 1994 on pay-TV channel Premiere, now known as Sky Deutschland.

The structure of the show consisted of three short interviews of 15 minutes daily from 7:30 pm. The third guest was selected by the audience using phone voting. Hosts of the program included Sabine Brandi, Maggie Deckenbrock, Sandra Maischberger (1992), Roger Willemsen and Hubert Winkels.

An offshoot, 0137 Night Talk, was hosted by Bettina Rust.

== See also ==
- List of German television series
