= Andrea Fischer =

German politician

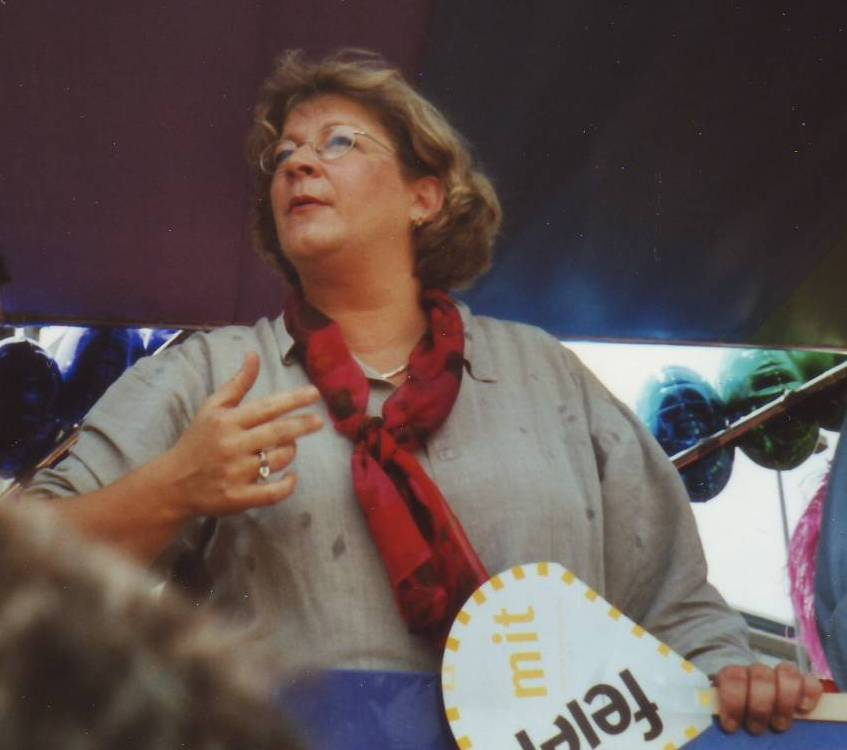
- Fischer in 2000

Federal Minister of Health
- In office 27 October 1998 – 12 January 2001
- Chancellor: Gerhard Schröder
- Preceded by: Horst Seehofer
- Succeeded by: Ulla Schmidt

Personal details
- Born: 14 January 1960 (age 66) Arnsberg, West Germany
- Party: Alliance 90/The Greens
- Education: Free University of Berlin
- Occupation: Politician; Lobbyist

Andrea Fischer (born 14 January 1960) is a former member of the German Bundestag for the German Green Party and from 1998 until 2001 was Federal Minister for Health. She dropped out of the Bundestag in 2002.

== Life ==
=== Education and profession ===
After graduating from high school, Andrea Fischer completed an apprenticeship as an offset printer. She then worked as a printer and proofreader and additionally completed her studies in economics at the Free University of Berlin. After completing her studies, she worked as a research assistant at the European Parliament, the WZB Berlin Social Science Center and the Federal Insurance Institution for Employees (Bundesversicherungsanstalt für Angestellte).

=== Political career ===
She has been a member of the German Green Party since 1985, before that she was a member of the Group of International Marxists (GIM), the then German section of the Fourth International. From 1994 to 2002 she was a member of the German Bundestag. After the 1998 federal elections, she was appointed Federal Minister of Health on 27 October 1998, as a member of the federal government headed by Gerhard Schröder. She resigned from office on 9 January 2001 in the wake of the BSE crisis. Shortly afterwards, the resignation of the Federal Minister of Agriculture, Karl-Heinz Funke, was also announced. In the film Schlachtfeld Politik – Die finstere Seite der Macht (Battlefield Politics – The dark side of power) by Stephan Lamby, she describes that there was massive pressure from the party leadership. The film asks whether Andrea Fischer had to resign after Joschka Fischer's wild years (Der Spiegel edition 2/2001), not so much because of the BSE crisis as to relieve Joschka Fischer.

Fischer was elected as the leading Alliance 90/The Greens candidate in the Berlin election on 18 September 2011, in the district assembly (Bezirksverordnetenversammlung) of Berlin's Mitte borough, where she was chair of the Alliance 90/The Greens parliamentary group until 30 October 2012.

On 15 October 2012 Fischer was elected by the Regional Assembly to the office of Finance Director of the Hanover Region, which had been restructured by Regional President Hauke Jagau. It manages the areas of finance, facility management and hospitals. In April 2013 she took over as chairman of the supervisory board of the Klinikum Region Hanover.

=== Lobbyism ===
After her time as an active politician, Fischer became active as a freelance publicist and lobbyist in international health policy. From 2001 to 2009 she was patron of the Federal Association of Experienced Psychiatrists (Bundesverband Psychiatrie-Erfahrener). From 2004 to 2006 Fischer was a member of the management team of the consulting firm Institut für Organisationskommunikation (IFOK GmbH), where she was responsible for health and nutrition. Previously, she was head of the Center of Canadian Universities (CUC) in Berlin.

Fischer is Vice Chairwoman of the Board of Trustees of the Institute of Man, Ethics and Science (Institut Mensch, Ethik und Wissenschaft).

From 2006 to 2009 she worked at the PR agency Pleon in Munich, where she headed the medical-pharmaceutical area of healthcare. Since then she has been self-employed in this field. Since April 2006, Fischer has been co-editor of GesundheitsNachrichten, a specialist journal for the health industry.

=== Journalism ===
From October 2002 to the end of 2003, Andrea Fischer and BamS editor-in-chief Claus Strunz hosted the n-tv programme Grüner Salon. She appears regularly in broadcasts on Deutschlandradio Kultur, where she presents new publications of German-language crime literature.

=== Other commitments ===
Fischer supported the Berlin Pro-Reli campaign, which failed in April 2009, as a testimonial. Since 2008 she has been the diocesan leader of the Malteser Hilfsdienst in Berlin.

=== Religion ===
As a young woman, Fischer left the Catholic Church, into which she rejoined a good twenty years later.

== Publications ==
- Andrea Fischer: Was glaubst denn du?: Die Menschen und der liebe Gott. Goldmann HC, 2008, ISBN 978-3-442-31163-7.
- Andrea Fischer, Rainer Sibbel (Hrsg.): Der Patient als Kunde und Konsument. Wie viel Patientensouveränität ist möglich? Gabler Verlag, Wiesbaden 2011, ISBN 978-3-8349-2056-0.

Gesundheitsminister of the Bundesrepublik Deutschland:
Elisabeth Schwarzhaupt | Käte Strobel | Katharina Focke | Antje Huber | Anke Fuchs | Heiner Geißler | Rita Süssmuth | Ursula Lehr | Gerda Hasselfeldt | Horst Seehofer | Andrea Fischer | Ulla Schmidt
