= Sandra Maischberger =

German journalist, talk show host, and author

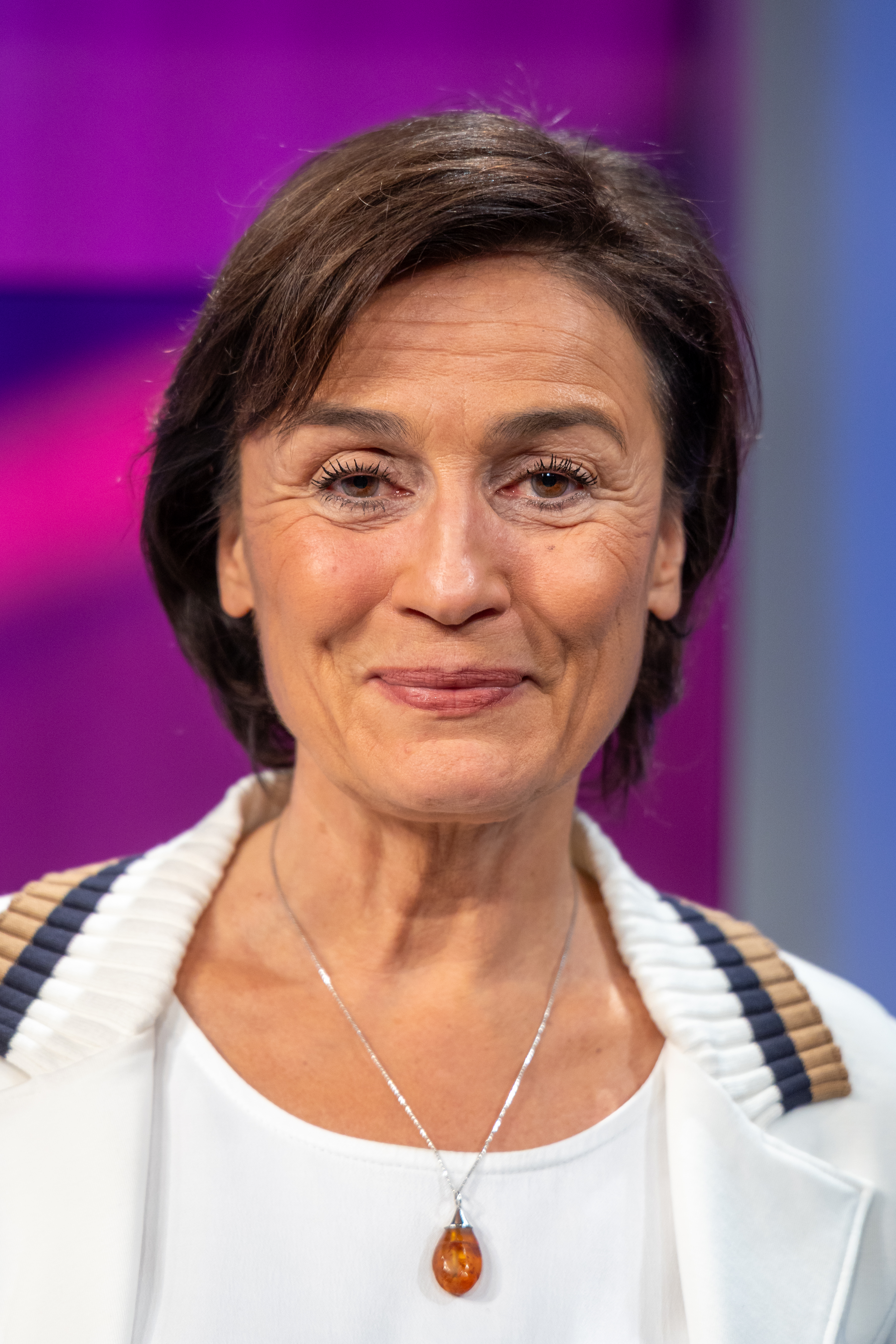
- Maischberger in 2025
- Born: 25 August 1966 (age 60); Munich, West Germany
- Spouse: Jan Kerhart
- Children: Samuel (born 24 February 2007)
- Presenting career
- Show: Maischberger's Guests 2003–present
- Network: ARD
- Show: Maischberger (2000–2006)
- Network: n-tv

Sandra Maischberger (German: [ˈzandʁa ˈmaɪʃbɛʁɡɐ]; born 25 August 1966) is a German journalist, talk show host, and author.

== Early life and education ==
Born in Munich, Maischberger spent five years of her childhood in Frascati, near Rome, Italy, and also grew up in Garching, near Munich. Her father was a physicist for the Max Planck Society and her mother was a tour guide. She is the sister of German archeologist Martin Maischberger.

Maischberger's initial career choices while growing up were to become a veterinarian or a detective. She later attended LMU Munich's School of Journalism but dropped out after 3 days in order to start her media career directly.

== Career ==
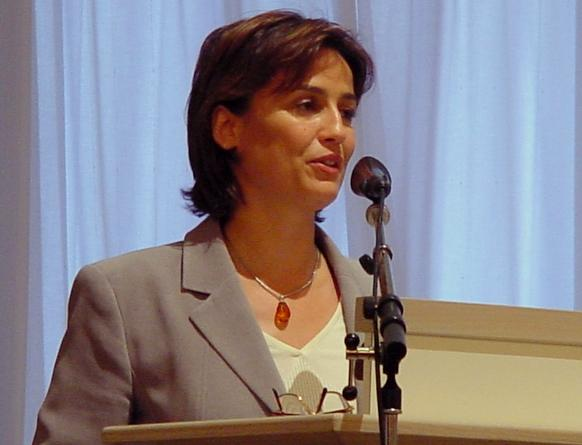
Maischberger in 2002

Maischberger started her career at the Bayerischer Rundfunk and has since been working for various television stations including Premiere, RTL, VOX, n-tv, and ARD. From 1992, she moderated 0137, a live-broadcast talk show, in rotation with Roger Willemsen.

Maischberger has written several books including Hand aufs Herz (an interview with Helmut Schmidt) and Die musst Du kennen — Menschen machen Geschichte, an encyclopaedia of the most prominent scientists, artists and politicians from classical times to the present.

Since 2003, Maischberger has been moderating the talk show maischberger. die woche on Das Erste. In 2009, on the occasion of the 60th anniversary of the Federal Republic of Germany, she interviewed Chancellor Angela Merkel. Alongside Maybrit Illner, Peter Kloeppel and Claus Strunz, Maischberger later moderated the only TV election debate between Merkel and her competitor Martin Schulz ahead of the 2017 elections, which was aired live on four of Germany's most-watched television channels during prime-time. In her talk show, she has also interviewed international guests, including Minister of Finance Yanis Varoufakis of Greece (2016), Chancellor Sebastian Kurz of Austria (2018) former President of the European Commission Jean-Claude Juncker (2020) and Bill Gates (2021).

Maischberger co-hosted the annual German Television Award ceremony in 2002, 2010 and 2014. She served on the award's jury in 2001, 2002 and 2006.

== Other activities ==
In addition to her work as a journalist, Maischberger holds a variety of honorary positions, including the following:

- Federal Chancellor Helmut Schmidt Foundation, Member of the Board of Trustees (since 2017)
- Freya von Moltke Foundation for the New Kreisau, Member of the Advisory Board
- Jugend debattiert, Member of the Board of Trustees

In 2001, Maischberger and many other famous Berliners took part in the street art activity Buddy Bear Berlin Show. The proceeds raised from auctioning many bears were given to several children's and youth projects in Berlin. The bear designed by Maischberger in homage to the sculptures of Niki de Saint Phalle was auctioned in 2003 at Mercedes World at the Salzufer in Berlin. The total proceeds came to over €171,000. Today, the bear can be found at the museum in Bad Pyrmont.

In 2008, Maischberger founded an organization called Vincentino, which helps expose underprivileged children to the arts through sponsoring cultural projects in schools. Moreover, she supports the work done by the Freya von Moltke Foundation and the Kreisau Initiative in the running of the New Kreisau in regards to the opportunities that are given to the younger population throughout Europe.

Launched at the 81st Venice International Film Festival in Italy, Sandra produced the documentary directed by Andres Veiel, Riefenstahl, a documentary about the German filmmaker Leni Riefenstahl.

== Recognition ==
Maischberger has been awarded numerous prizes, including the Golden Camera from German magazine Hörzu for her Helmut Schmidt interview.

- 2000: Hanns-Joachim-Friedrichs-Award
- 2001: Bavarian TV Award
- 2002: Ernst Schneider Prize
- 2002: Goldene Kamera
- 2004: Medienpreis für Sprachkultur, Association for the German Language (GfdS)
- 2008: Goldene Kamera
- 2013: Order of Merit of the Federal Republic of Germany
- 2016: Romy
- 2024: Deutscher Fernsehpreis (National German Television Award)

== Personal life ==
Maischberger is married to cameraman Jan Kerhart. After 12 years of marriage, their first child, son Samuel, was born on 24 February 2007. The family has homes in Hamburg and in Berlin. Maischberger likes to travel and also enjoys mountain climbing and diving. She speaks Italian, Spanish, English and French.
