= Reggel =

Daily newspaper in Hungary (2004–2005)

- Type: Daily newspaper
- Owner: Axel Springer
- Editor-in-chief: Zsolt H. Toót
- Founded: 18 October 2004
- Ceased publication: December 2005
- Language: Hungarian
- Headquarters: Budapest
- Country: Hungary

Reggel (Hungarian pronunciation: [ˈrɛɡːɛl], Hungarian: Morning) was a daily newspaper published in Budapest, Hungary, between October 2004 and December 2005.

== History and profile ==
Reggel was first published on 18 October 2004. Axel Springer was the founder and owner of the daily which was based in Budapest. The paper was modeled on Hamburger Abendblatt and it targeted the readers in the greater Budapest area.

Zsolt H. Toót served as the editor of the paper. Between October and December 2004 Reggel had a circulation of 55,130 copies. The paper ceased publication in December 2005.
