= Maischberger. die woche =

German talk show

maischberger. die woche
- Logo from 2016 to 2019
- Genre: Talk show
- Presented by: Sandra Maischberger
- Country of origin: Germany
- Original language: German

Production
- Running time: 75 minutes
- Production company: Vincent Berlin GmbH

Original release
- Network: Das Erste
- Release: 2 September 2003 – present

maischberger. die woche ("maischberger. the week"; from 2003 to 2016: Menschen bei Maischberger, "People at Maischberger"; from 2016 to 2019: maischberger) is a German weekly talk show named after the show's host Sandra Maischberger, first aired in 2003.

In the show, five to six guests discuss current political topics. It is aired Wednesdays on Das Erste.

== History ==
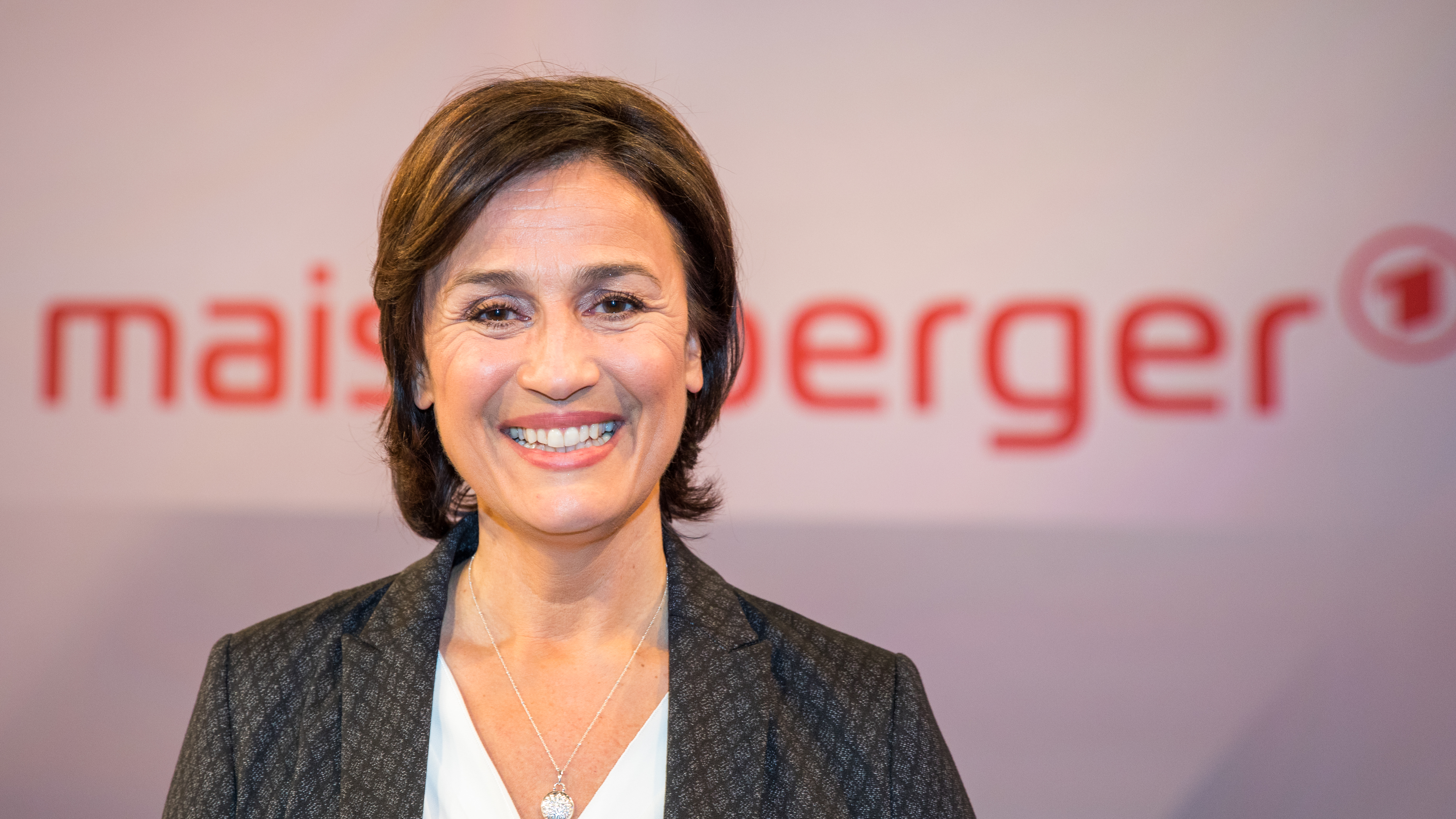
Moderator Sandra Maischberger in 2019

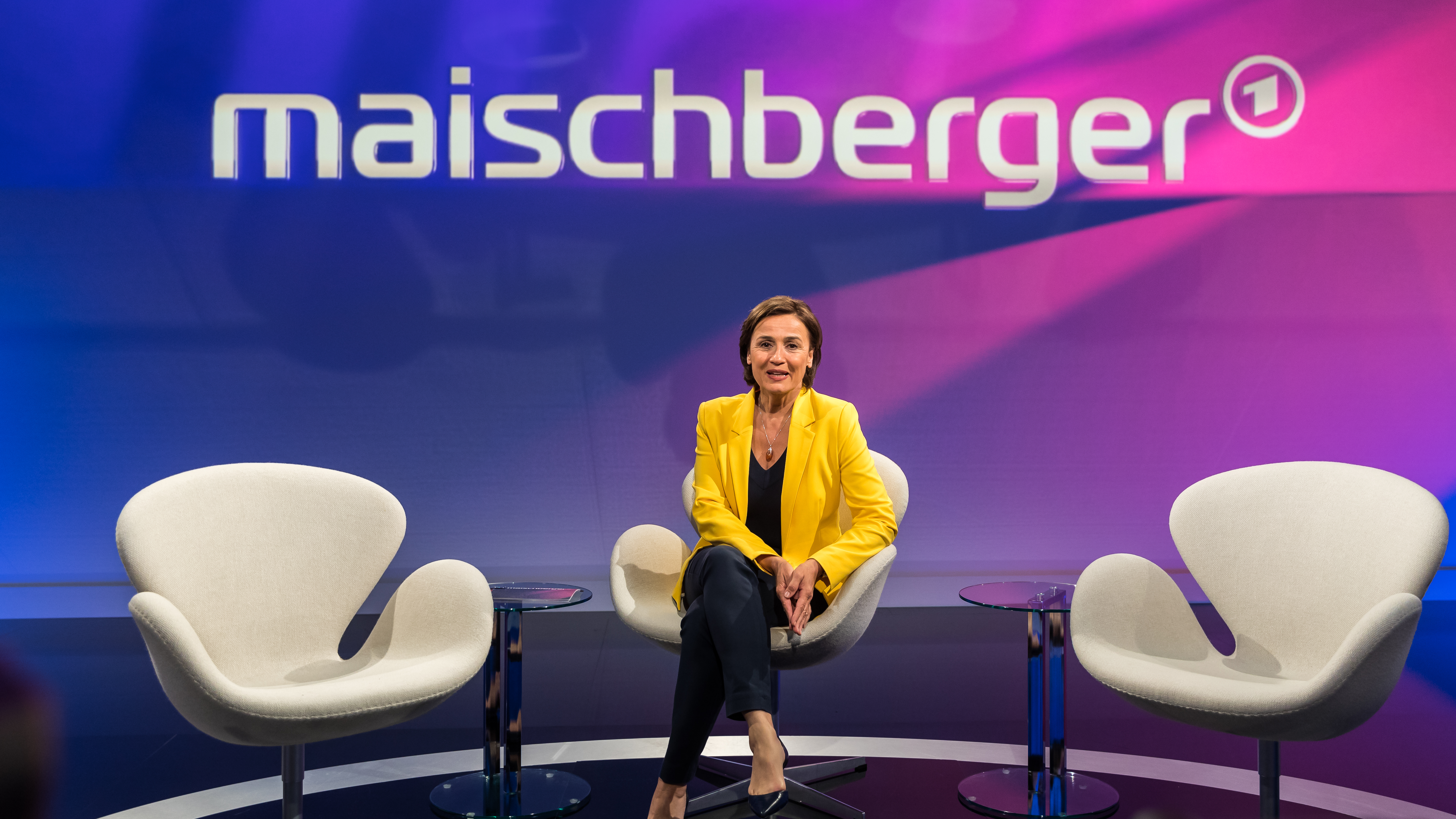
The studio of maischberger

The show was first aired on 2 September 2003 on Das Erste under the name Menschen bei Maischberger. It replaced the show Boulevard Bio moderated by Alfred Biolek. On 13 January 2016, after 475 parts, the channel place changed and the show was renamed to maischberger. On 21 November 2017, due to the failed exploratory talks on the formation of a government after the federal election, an issue was broadcast on a Tuesday, exceptionally. On 12 June 2019, the show was renamed again to maischberger. die woche.

Since 11 March 2020, a variation of the show called maischberger. vor ort is planned that will be produced in different regions of Germany. The format is produced by the Berlin-based company Vincent Berlin GmbH, in which Sandra Maischberger has a stake, on behalf of Westdeutscher Rundfunk (WDR).

== Awards ==
- 2016: Deutscher Fernsehpreis for Beste Talkshow ("best talk show")
- 2019: Die Goldene Kartoffel (negative price) for its content
