= Grüner Salon =

- Presented by: Erich Böhme; Heinz Eggert; Claus Strunz; Andrea Fischer
- Country of origin: Germany
- Original language: German

Production
- Producer: n-tv
- Production location: Volksbühne Berlin

Original release
- Release: 6 October 1997 – 2003

Grüner Salon was a weekly talk show on the German news channel n-tv mostly hosted by Erich Böhme and Heinz Eggert.

n-tv stopped the show at the end of 2003 due to financial reasons, but also program optimization would have played a role in this decision.

== Location ==
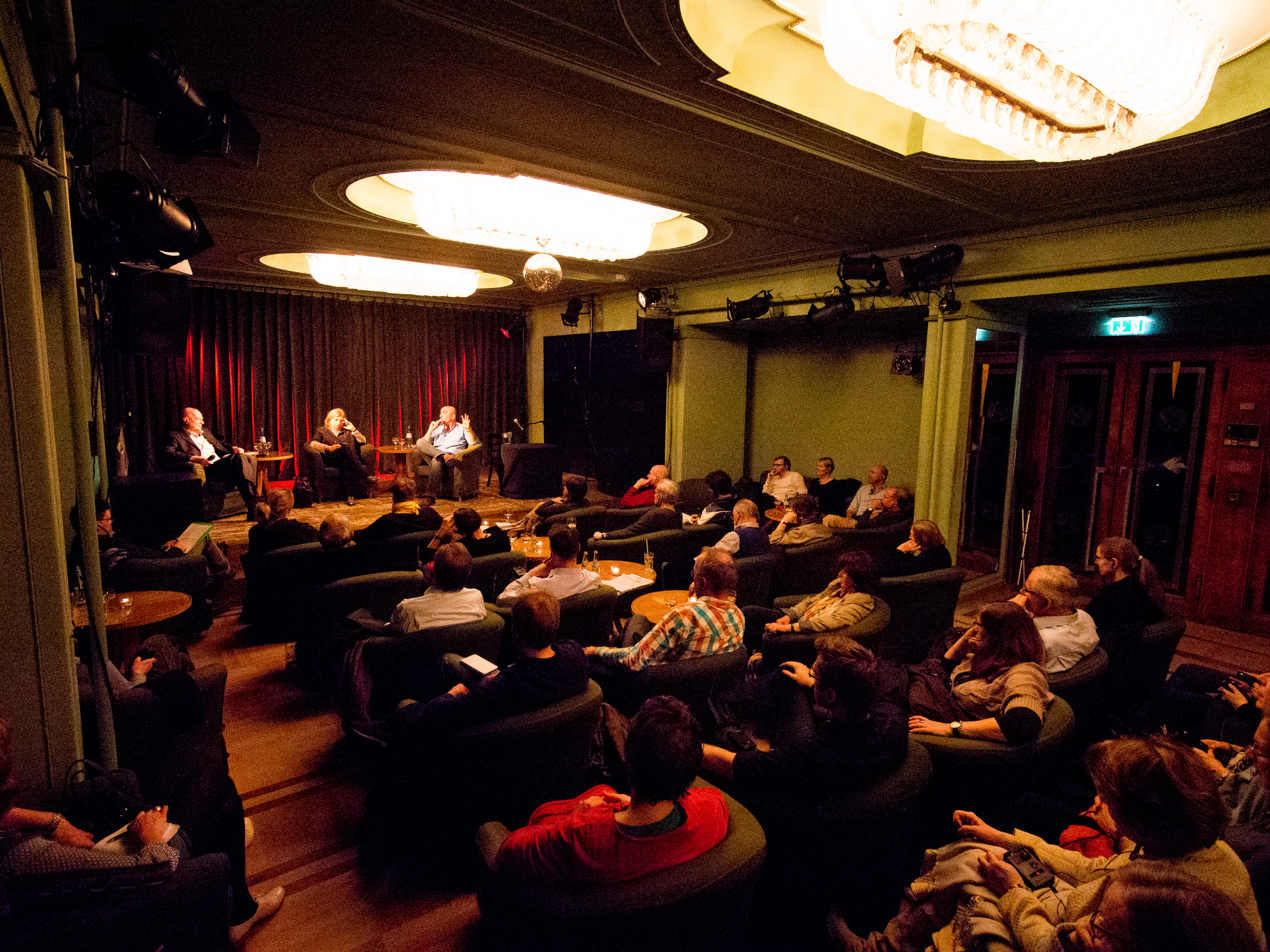
Grüner Salon of the Berlin's Volksbühne.

The program was broadcast from the Grüner Salon of the Volksbühne in Berlin.

== Hosts ==
- Heinz Eggert (1997-2002)
- Erich Böhme (1997–2002)
- Claus Strunz (2002-2003)
- Andrea Fischer (2002-2003)
