= Mercurius Hungaricus =

Newspaper

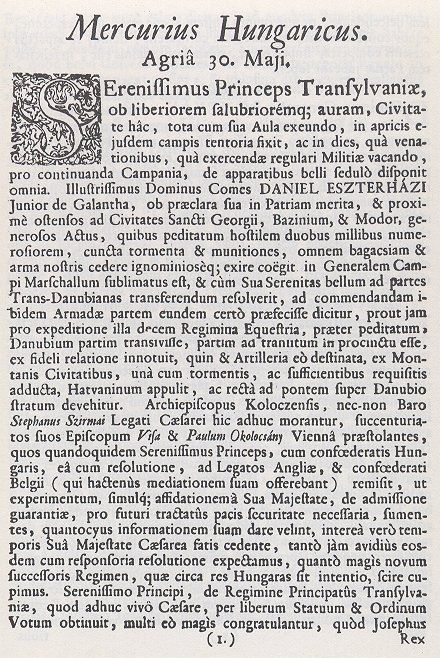
- May 1705 issue
- Type: Periodical newspaper
- Format: Octavo
- Owner: Francis II Rákóczi's chancellery
- Founded: 5 June 1705
- Language: Latin
- Country: Hungary

Mercurius Hungaricus (Hungarian: Magyar Merkúr), later Mercurius Veridicus ex Hungaria was the first periodical newspaper in the Kingdom of Hungary, published between 1705 and 1710 (only seven issues). It was a semiofficial news release for the Rákóczi's War of Independence, the articles were written in mostly Latin language.
