= Klaus Bresser =

German journalist and television presenter (1936–2026)

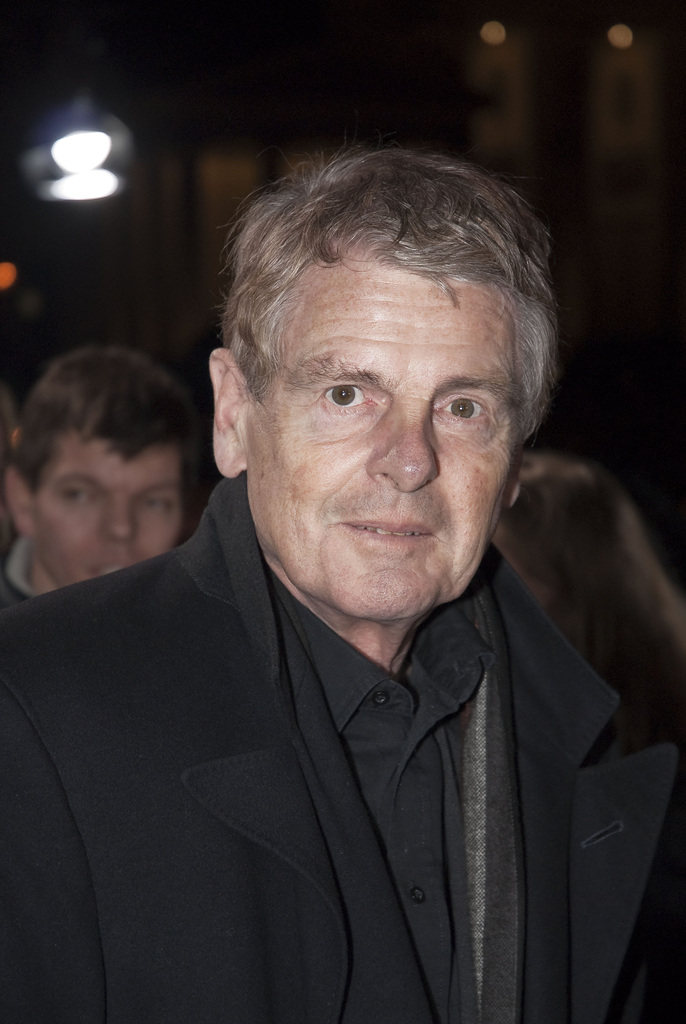
Bresser at Berlinale 2008

Klaus Bresser (22 July 1936 – 7 October 2026) was a German journalist and television presenter.

== Life and career ==
Bresser was born in Berlin on 22 July 1936. He studied at the University of Cologne. Bresser worked as a journalist for German broadcasters (from 1965 for Westdeutscher Rundfunk and from 1977 for ZDF). He was Editor-in-Chief of ZDF. He died on 7 October 2026, at the age of 90.

== Awards ==
- Theodor Wolff Prize (1963)
- Goldene Kamera (1986)
- Herbert Quandt Medien Prize (1989)
- Order of Merit of Rhineland-Palatinate (2000)

== Books by Bresser ==
- Bresser, Klaus (1994). Was nun, liebe Wähler? Die deutschen Parteien, ihre Kandidaten und ihre Ziele 1994 (in German). Stuttgart: Dt. Verl.-Anst. ISBN 978-3-421-06684-8. OCLC 243782151.
- Bresser, Klaus (1992). Was nun? : über Fernsehen, Moral und Journalisten (in German). Hamburg: Luchterhand. ISBN 3-630-87111-9. OCLC 32444790.
- Bresser, Klaus (1988). Sonntagsgespräche (in German). München: Knaur. ISBN 3-426-03928-1. OCLC 19674227.

=== Caricatures of the year ===
- Die Karikaturen des Jahres 1990/91. Verlag Walter Podszun, Brilon 1991, ISBN 3-923448-85-6
- Die Karikaturen des Jahres 1991/92. Verlag Walter Podszun, Brilon 1992, ISBN 3-923448-97-X
- Die Karikaturen des Jahres 1992/93. Verlag Walter Podszun, Brilon 1993, ISBN 3-86133-114-4
- Die Karikaturen des Jahres 1993/94. Verlag Walter Podszun, Brilon 1994, ISBN 3-86133-121-7
- Die Karikaturen des Jahres 1996. Verlag Walter Podszun, Brilon 1997, ISBN 3-86133-149-7
- Die Karikaturen des Jahres 1997. Verlag Walter Podszun, Brilon 1998, ISBN 3-86133-164-0
- Die Karikaturen des Jahres 1998. Verlag Walter Podszun, Brilon 1999, ISBN 3-86133-182-9
