= Eins gegen Eins =

- Presented by: Claus Strunz
- Country of origin: Germany
- Original language: German

Production
- Producer: Sat.1
- Production location: Berlin
- Running time: 38 min

Original release
- Release: 21 March 2011 – 29 October 2013

Eins gegen Eins was a German political talk show, hosted by Claus Strunz, which was broadcast on Sat.1 and produced by Focus TV Produktions GmbH.

== Concept ==
At Eins gegen Eins, two persons, each with fundamentally different opinions, should start a speech duel against each other. At the beginning, a topic is given on which the audience should vote, on which there is a pro- and a contra-opinion, which differ clearly from each other. In the second half of the programme, you say goodbye to the title "One against one" and give each party another proponent of the opinion who should support the respective proponent or opponent. The studio reminds a lot of a show, because it is equipped with many light effects. The talk was presented by Claus Strunz. Until the next show started, you was also able to vote on the question via Facebook.

== Production ==
The show was produced by Focus TV and was broadcast from season 1 to 3 Mondays at 11.30 pm. In the 1st and 3rd season the program was broadcast after the Spiegel TV Reportage and in the 2nd season after the Focus TV Reportage. On 21 May 2012, after the season final of the third season, Eins gegen Eins was extended by a fourth season, which began broadcasting on 7 May 2013. The new season also got a new slot, on Tuesdays around 11.25 pm, after the Akte 2013 magazine.

On 28 October 2013, a day before the season final of season four, Eins gegen Eins was extended by a fifth season, which was scheduled to be broadcast in 2014. In August 2014 it became known that a broadcast in 2014 will not take place.

== Hosts ==
- Claus Strunz (2011–2013)
