= Hamburger Abendblatt =

German newspaper in Hamburg

- The 29 January 2011 front page
- Type: Daily newspaper (except Sunday)
- Format: Broadsheet
- Owner: Funke Mediengruppe
- Editor-in-chief: Claus Strunz
- Founded: 1948; 78 years ago
- Language: German
- Headquarters: Hamburg, Germany
- Circulation: 286,992 (Quarter 2, 2009)
- ISSN: 0949-4618
- OCLC number: 85355780
- Website: www.abendblatt.de

Hamburger Abendblatt (lit. 'Hamburg Evening Newspaper') is a German daily newspaper in Hamburg belonging to the Funke Mediengruppe, publishing Monday to Saturday.

The paper focuses on news in Hamburg and its surrounds, and produces regional supplements with news from Norderstedt, Harburg, and Pinneberg.

Its authors have won journalistic prizes including the Theodor Wolff Prize (Jan Haarmeyer, Barbara Hardinghaus, Miriam Opresnik, Özlem Topçu), the Wächterpreis der Tagespresse (Christian Denso, Marion Girke, and the Deutscher Reporter:innenpreis (German Reporter Prize) (Volker ter Haseborg, Antje Windmann). The paper was also awarded the Deutscher Lokaljournalistenpreis six times since 2004 by the Konrad Adenauer Foundation.

== History and profile ==
Four previous Hamburg newspapers had the word Abendblatt (lit. 'Evening Newspaper') in their title, including Hamburger Abendblatt founded on 2 May 1820. However, the incarnation of Hamburger Abendblatt, was first published after World War II on 14 October 1948 with an initial edition of 60,000 copies. The paper received a publishing license from the Hamburg Senate and Mayor Max Brauer, making it the first daily paper of post-war Germany to receive a license from German rather than Allied occupation authorities. After about six months of operation, its circulation increased to 170,000 copies daily.

From 1948 through 2013, Hamburger Abendblatt was published by Axel Springer AG. The paper is published by Funke Mediengruppe, which purchased it from Axel Springer effective 1 January 2014. The paper used to appear Monday through Saturday only, but since 29 October 2006 it has also published a Sunday edition to compete with the Hamburger Morgenpost's introduction of a Sunday edition on 5 November 2006.

== Circulation ==
Hamburger Abendblatt had a circulation of 288,000 copies in 2001. The circulation of the paper was 252,533 copies in the first quarter of 2006. It rose to 286,992 copies in the second quarter of 2009.

== Editors-in-chief ==
- Wilhelm Schulze, 1948–1952
- Otto Siemer, 1952–1965
- Martin Saller, 1965–1969
- Werner Titzrath, 1969–1983
- Klaus Korn, 1983–1989
- Peter Kruse, 1989–2001
- Menso Heyl, 2001–2008
- Claus Strunz, 2008 until June 2011
- Lars Haider, since July 2011
