= Heinz Eggert =

German theologian and politician

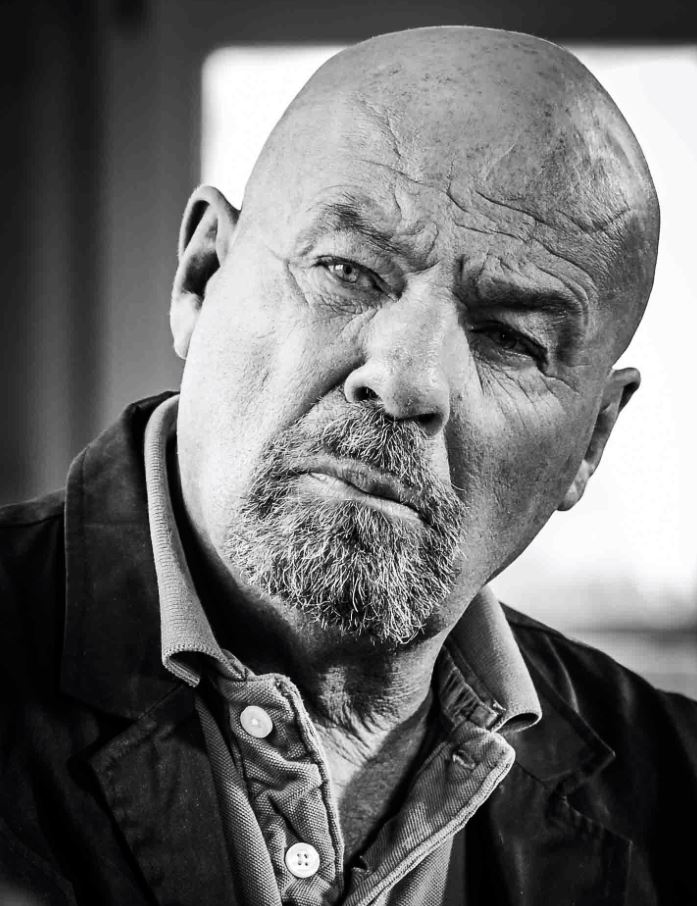
- Heinz Eggert (2014)
- Born: 6 May 1946 (age 80); Rostock, Germany

Heinz Eggert (born 6 May 1946 in Rostock) is a German theologian and politician (CDU). He was Saxon Minister of the Interior from 1991 to 1995 and a member of the Saxon State Parliament from 1994 to 2009.

== Life ==
After an apprenticeship at the Deutsche Reichsbahn, he worked from 1964 as signal box master and dispatcher at the Rostock port railway. After his protest in 1968 against the invasion of Warsaw contract troops in Prague, he was no longer allowed to work at the Warnemünde border station for political reasons. From 1969 to 1974 he studied Protestant-Lutheran theology at the University of Rostock and then became parish priest in Oybin and student priest in Zittau until 1990. His parsonage was a meeting point for many in the GDR who had problems with the political system. During this time, up to 67 persons of the State Security Service were assigned to spy on him.

According to his own statement, he had voluntarily registered as a patient of the psychiatry in Großschweidnitz after a severe dysentery disease. The Stasi file later revealed that two of the doctors there were unofficial Stasi employees (IM). Investigations by the Dresden Public prosecutor's office were closed for lack of evidence.

In the phase of the peaceful revolution in the GDR, he became involved as a member of the New Forum and participated in the Runder Tisch.

Heinz Eggert is married and has four children.

== Politics ==
In May 1990, Eggert became a non-party district administrator in the Zittau district.

He became known nationwide through the immediate dismissal of all communist leaders in the district administration. Hence the name "Reverend Merciless".

In October 1990 he joined the CDU, from 1991 to 1995 and from 1997 to 2001 was deputy state chairman of the CDU in Saxony and from 1992 to 1995 deputy federal chairman of the CDU ("Der Schimanski von Dresden").

On 30 September 1991 he was appointed Saxony's Minister of State for the Interior. During his time in office, he fought hard against extremist tendencies in Saxony.

In July 1991 he founded the "SOKO REX", which was intended to counter the drastic right-wing extremist acts of violence and assaults.

In 1994 he entered the Saxon State Parliament with a direct mandate and 65 percent of the votes.

In October 1995, Eggert was re-elected to the CDU state executive and was again deputy state chairman of the Saxon CDU from 1997 to 2001. In the 1999 elections he was confirmed as a member of parliament with 65.2% of the votes in his constituency of Löbau-Zittau 2.

From April 2005 to July 2008, Eggert headed the Enquete Commission appointed by the Saxon State Parliament on "Demographic development and its effects on the areas of life of people in the Free State of Saxony and its consequences for the political fields of action", which presented its 400-page report on 30 September 2008.

Heinz Eggert did not stand for the state elections on 30 August 2009. Stephan Meyer (CDU) from Oderwitz was elected to the Saxon state parliament for his constituency.

== Accusations and leave of absence ==
On 19 June 1995, he took leave of absence at his own request after male employees had made accusations of sexual harassment. Eggert rejected all accusations, requested an investigation and later filed a complaint himself, which was not pursued further by the Public prosecutor's office, since there was no justified initial suspicion. However, he could not prevent this incident from attracting a great deal of media attention and rumours of alleged bisexuality being spread. Finally, on 10 July 1995 Eggert resigned as Minister of the Interior, resigned his party offices, but retained his mandate in the Landtag. Prime Minister Kurt Biedenkopf, who had had the accusations investigated by an independent judge, regretted Eggert's resignation and declared: "Unfortunately, Eggert had fallen victim to an infamous intrigue".

Eggert himself considers the accusations to be an originally personal action that was used politically. In December 1995 Eggert won a trial against his former press spokesman Schönherr before the Dresden Regional Court and may continue to claim: "My former press spokesman Detlef Schönherr is arrogant, was lazy and has always lied to me."

== Other activities ==
From April 1996 to 1998, Eggert worked in the trust property company (Treuhandliegenschaftsgesellschaft) to accelerate the return of the requested property to the municipalities. From 1996 to September 2002 he hosted the Grüner Salon together with Erich Böhme and later with Andrea Fischer on n-tv. Since April 2010 Heinz Eggert has been President of the Television Academy Central Germany in Leipzig as successor to Jürgen Doetz. Since 2009 Eggert has been working as a volunteer at the hospice in Herrnhut.

Eggert was also a columnist for the Kostblog.

== Literature ==
- Klaus-Jürgen Holzapfel (Hrsg.): Sächsischer Landtag. 4. Wahlperiode. 2004–2009. Stand: 12. Juni 2006. Rheinbreitbach 2006, S. 40.
