= Esti Budapest =

Defunct Hungarian newspaper

- Esti Budapest, 6 October 1956
- Type: Evening newspaper
- Founded: 2 April 1952
- Ceased publication: 23 October 1956
- Language: Hungarian
- Headquarters: Budapest
- Country: Hungary
- OCLC number: 34883422

Esti Budapest (Hungarian pronunciation: [ˈɛʃti ˈbudɒpɛʃt], meaning Evening Budapest in English, was a Hungarian newspaper. It was published daily (except Sundays) from 2 April 1952 to 23 October 1956.

== History and profile ==
Esti Budapest was first published on 2 April 1952. The paper was the successor of Vilagossag. It was an evening newspaper and featured mostly leisure- and culture-related news. The paper was the organ of the Budapest Party Committee of the Hungarian Working People's Party and the Budapest City Council.

Esti Budapest ceased publication on 23 October 1956, and was later replaced by Esti Hírlap.

== See also ==
- Eastern Bloc information dissemination
