= Mai Nap =

Daily newspaper in Hungary (1989–2005)

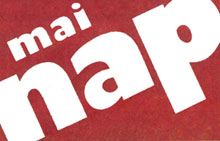
- Type: Daily newspaper
- Format: Tabloid
- Founded: 9 February 1989
- Ceased publication: 15 June 2005
- Language: Hungarian
- Headquarters: Budapest
- Country: Hungary
- ISSN: 1588-2403
- Website: Mai Nap

Mai Nap (Hungarian pronunciation: [ˈmɒji ˈnɒp], Hungarian: Today's Day) was a tabloid newspaper published daily in Budapest, Hungary. It began publishing early in the country's post-communist era. It was in circulation between 1989 and 2005.

== History and profile ==
Mai Nap was the first newspaper published immediately following the collapse of the communism in Hungary. The paper was first published in February 1989 and the founders were three Hungarian journalists. It was a tabloid newspaper. During its initial period it included 24 to 32 pages and was published daily except for Saturdays.

The owner of Mai Nap was a state-owned bank. Rupert Murdoch acquired 50% of Mai Nap in January 1990, but sold it back in 1993 due to its low circulation levels. Then the paper was acquired by the Swiss company JMG Ost Press. At the beginning of the 2000s it was owned by the VNU group, a Dutch company, which also owned another Hungarian paper, Magyar Hirlap.

Marcell Murányi served as the editor-in-chief of Mai Nap. Although the paper was independent, its editorials were supportive of the right-wing political parties in the periods of 1994 general election and 1998 general election.

Mai Nap folded in June 2005 due to low circulation levels.

== Circulation ==
In the 1990s, Mai Nap had highest circulation levels on Sundays. The paper sold 140,000 copies in January 1991 and 104,000 copies in July 1992. The circulation of the paper was 85,000 copies in March 1993. The paper had a circulation of 79,000 copies and had 396,000 readers in 1998. The 2003 circulation of the paper was 66,000 copies.
