= Magyar Hírmondó =

Hungarian newspaper

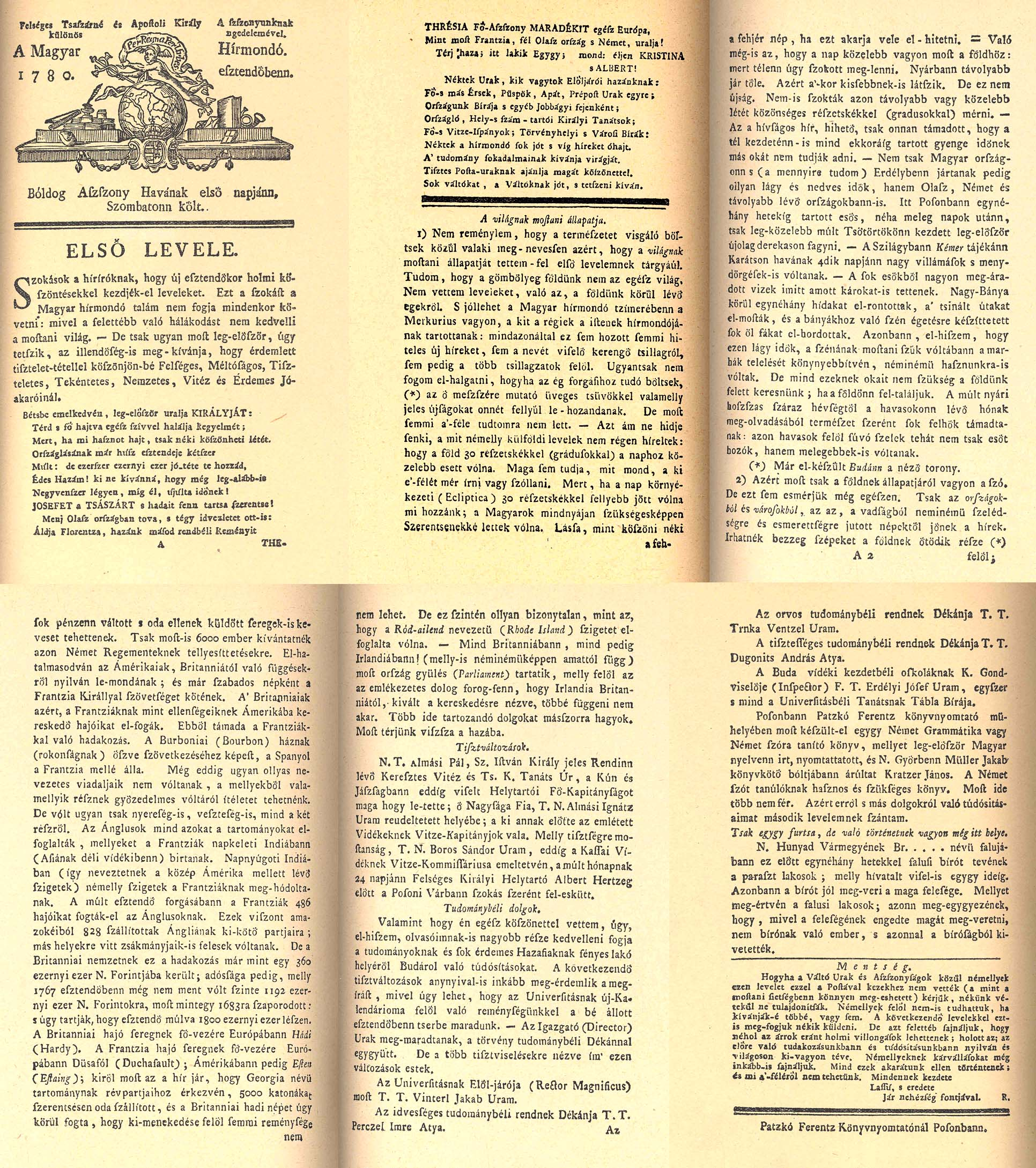
- Publisher: Ferenc Ágoston Patzkó
- Editor: Mátyás Rát
- Founded: 1 January 1780
- Language: Hungarian
- Ceased publication: 1788
- Headquarters: Pressburg, Kingdom of Hungary
- Country: Hungary

Magyar Hírmondó is the first newspaper to be published in the Hungarian language in Pressburg, Kingdom of Hungary (present-day Bratislava, Slovakia). The first issue appeared on 1 January 1780. Its founders were Mátyás Rát, a Lutheran pastor and Ferenc Ágoston Patzkó, a publisher from Pressburg. The latter was also the publisher. The paper was published in octavo format (a single column on half a printed sheet) twice a week, on Wednesdays and Saturdays. Mátyás Rát was the editor of the paper from its foundation in 1780 to 1782. Magyar Hírmondó folded in 1788.
