= Esti Hírlap =

Hungarian evening newspaper (1956–1996)

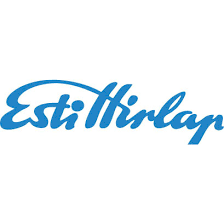
- Type: Evening newspaper
- Format: Tabloid
- Founded: 24 December 1956
- Ceased publication: 1996
- Language: Hungarian
- Headquarters: Budapest
- Country: Hungary
- OCLC number: 25621774

Esti Hírlap (Hungarian pronunciation: [ˈɛʃti ˈhiːrlɒp], Hungarian: Evening News or Evening Gazette) was a tabloid evening newspaper published in Budapest, Hungary, between 1956 and 1996.

== History and profile ==
Esti Hírlap was first published on 24 December 1956 which was a Communist evening paper. Its start was a reflection of the political consolidation in Hungary. The paper was the successor of Esti Budapest, another evening paper, and was based in Budapest. Until the end of the communist regime the paper was under the control of the Hungarian Communist Party. During this period it covered significant events which were regarded as appropriate for the people by the Communist authorities. In fact, it was populist and featured short human interest articles.

The British media company Mirror Group owned 40% of Esti Hírlap in October 1990. The other owners were the Hungarian News Publishing Company with the same share and the paper's editorial board with a 20% share. However, due to lower circulation levels the Mirror Group sold its share in 1992, and Esti Hírlap was renationalized. Under the cabinet led by Prime Minister Gyula Horn the editor-in-chief of the paper was removed from the post. It was closed down in 1996.

== Circulation ==
In 1987 Esti Hírlap had a circulation of 200,000 copies. The paper sold 130,000 copies in January 1989 and 93,000 copies in January 1991. The paper had a circulation of 70,000 copies in July 1992 and 60,000 copies in March 1993.
