= Claus Strunz =

German journalist and television host (born 1966)

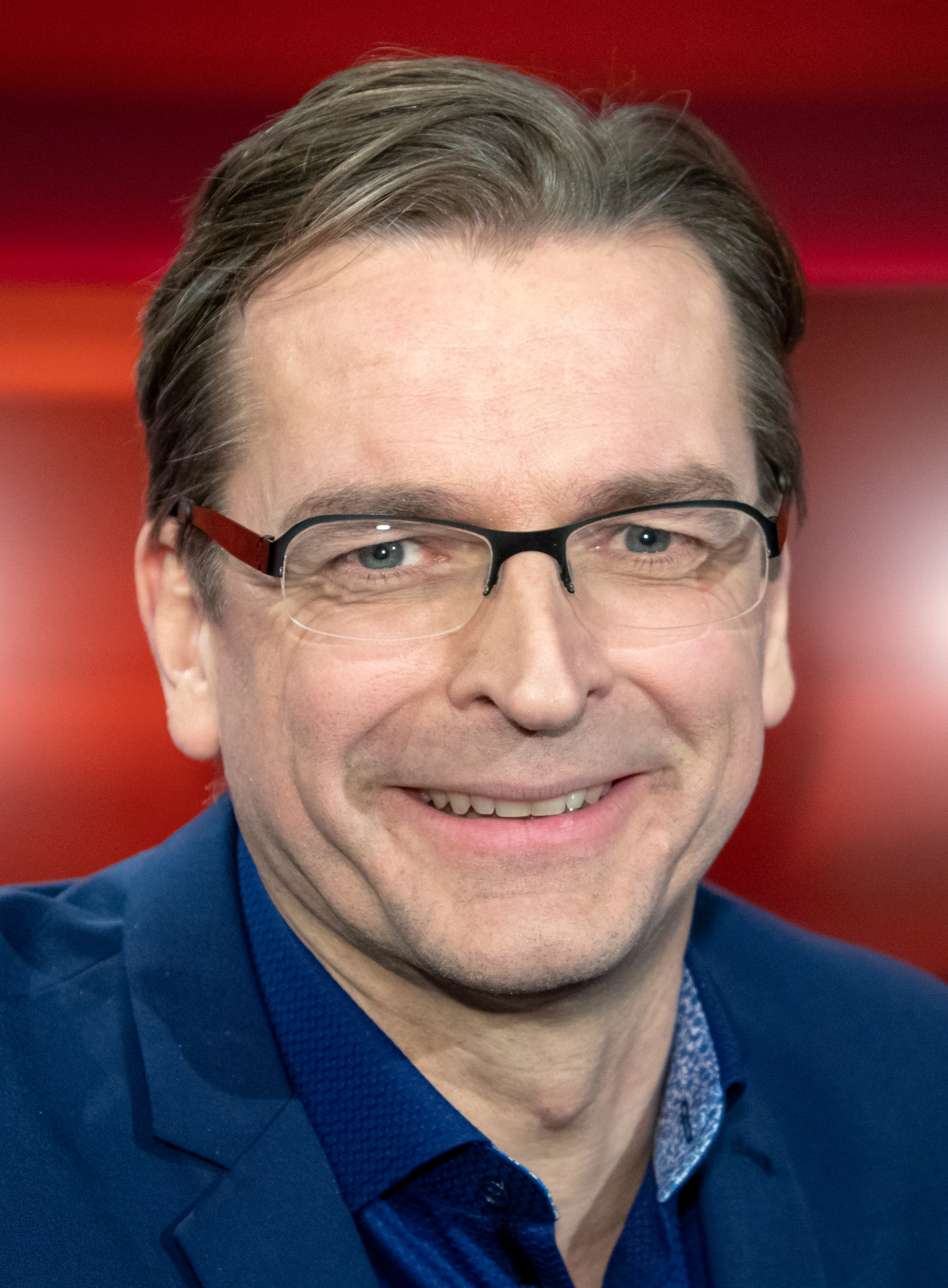
Strunz in 2018

Claus Strunz (born 29 September 1966) is a German journalist, television host, and media manager.

== Biography ==
Strunz was born in Münchberg. After graduating from high school in Bayreuth, he worked as a trainee at the Nordbayerischer Kurier. He then studied political science, German studies and media law at LMU Munich from 1989 to 1994. He became editor and head of the news department of the Munich Abendzeitung.

Strunz was deputy editor-in-chief of the daily newspaper Die Welt and from October 2000 editor-in-chief of Bild am Sonntag, the sunday edition of Bild, which he left on 1 August 2008. From October 2008 to mid-2011 Strunz was editor-in-chief of the Hamburger Abendblatt. Since then he has headed the TV and video production division at Axel Springer SE, which was created especially for him.

Since 2009 he has been a regular guest lecturer at the European Media and Business Academy of the Hochschule Mittweida.

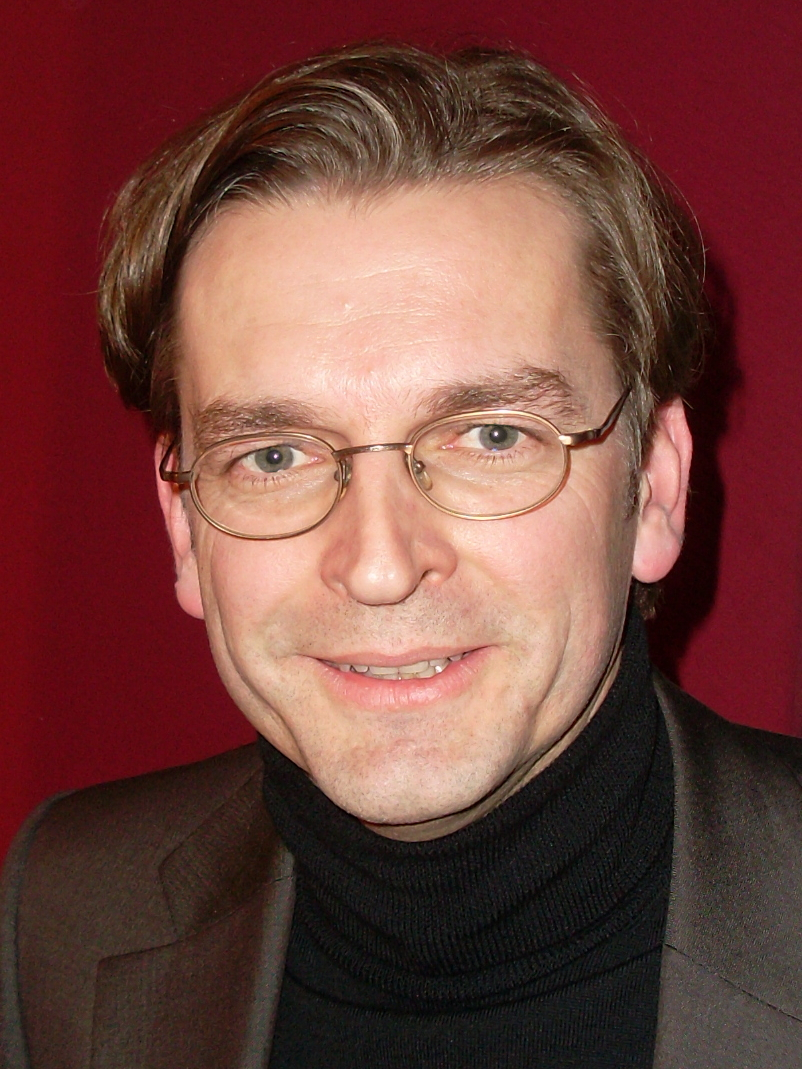
Strunz in 2008

Strunz appeared on television as host of the discussion programme Was erlauben Strunz!? (in reference to the famous statement by football coach Giovanni Trapattoni about player Thomas Strunz), which was broadcast by N24 (ProSiebenSat.1 Media AG at that time) until it was discontinued in summer 2010. Previously he had replaced Heinz Eggert on the n-tv talk show Der Grüne Salon from 2002. From March 2011 to October 2013 Strunz hosted the political debate Eins gegen Eins on Sat.1 and from June to December 2013 Deutschland Akut – der WELT Talk on N24.

On 1 July 2014 Strunz became managing director of Maz & More TV Produktion, which produces the breakfast television of Sat.1 (Sat.1-Frühstücksfernsehen). Strunz also appears there regularly as a commentator on current events. After Strunz moderated the program Akte – Reporter kämpfen für Sie in September 2015 as a representative for Ulrich Meyer, he took over the main presentation of the program on Sat.1 in January 2017.

In August and September 2017 he hosted several broadcasts on Sat.1 for the 2017 federal elections.

Strunz was married to the journalist and editor-in-chief of the Gala magazine Anne Meyer-Minnemann from 2005 to 2019 and has two daughters with her.

Strunz was one of four presenters of the TV duel between Angela Merkel and Martin Schulz for the 2017 federal elections. Strunz quoted SPD chancellor candidate Schulz as follows: "What the refugees bring to us is more valuable than gold." Schulz then fully echoed the quotation used against him by the AfD: "What the refugees bring to us is more valuable than gold. It is the unwavering belief in the dream of Europe. A dream we lost at some point." Strunz also asked with reference to the 226,000 persons obliged to leave Germany at the end of June 2017: "When will they be gone?" This choice of words and the fact that Strunz did not specifically mention the proportion of tolerated persons (159,678) met with criticism on the internet and in the media.

In October 2024, Strunz became CEO and editorial director of Euronews which came under criticism as their owners are tied to Hungarian prime minister Viktor Orbán. Therefore, rivaling Brussels news outlet Politico Europe voiced criticism about Strunz becoming appointed.
