= Roger Willemsen =

German author, essayist and TV presenter

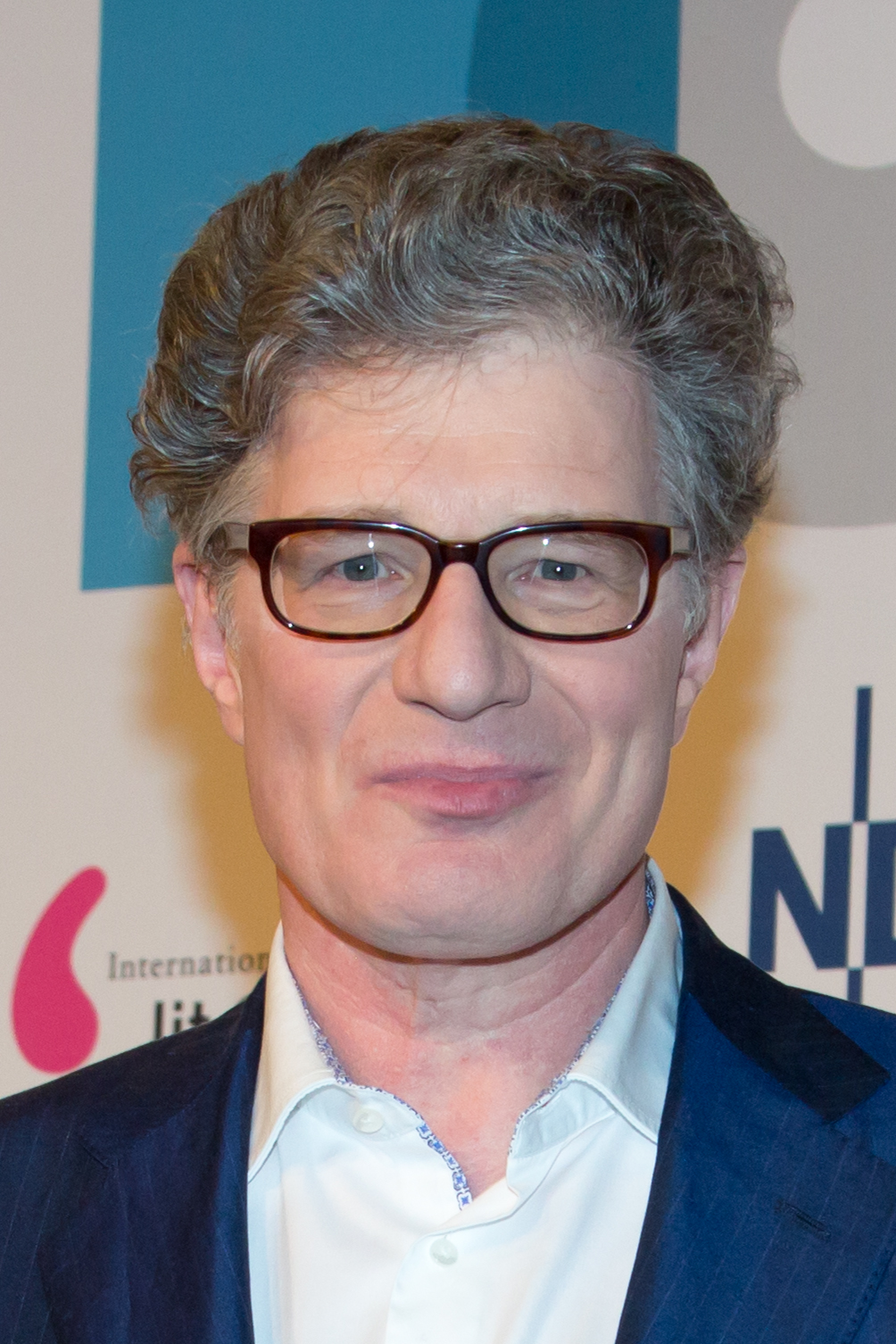
- Willemsen in March 2015
- Born: 15 August 1955; Bonn, North Rhine-Westphalia, West Germany
- Died: 7 February 2016 (aged 60); Wentorf bei Hamburg, Germany
- Scientific career
- Fields: German studies

Roger Willemsen (15 August 1955 – 7 February 2016) was a German author, essayist and TV presenter.

== Biography ==
Willemsen was born and passed his Abitur in Bonn. He studied German philology (Germanistik), philosophy and history of art in Bonn, Munich and Vienna and was awarded a scholarship by the Evangelisches Studienwerk. He did his postgraduate studies on Robert Musil and received his PhD.

He started his TV career in 1991 as head interviewer at 0137, a daily talkshow and signature programme at newly founded German pay-TV Premiere. He performed about 1.000 interviews, including some with imprisoned members of the Red Army Faction, a fugitive bank robber, a leftover cosmonaut in space station MIR and a cannibal. He also interviewed Audrey Hepburn, Jesse Jackson, Yasser Arafat, Lech Wałęsa, Dame Edna Everage and Madonna. Driven by Willemsen, the show won numerous prestigious awards. Willemsen was praised for his intellect, charm and wit. 1994 Willemsen got his own show Willemsens Woche on public broadcaster ZDF. In 2006 he ended his career in mass-TV.

In 1999, he interviewed the German musician Herbert Grönemeyer for Stern after Grönemeyer's wife Anna had died of cancer. Willemsen wrote newspaper columns in Zeit Magazin and Die Woche. He authored about 50 books, many of them inspired by travelling such as Die Enden der Welt / The Ends of the Earth. His last bestseller, published in 2014, is Das Hohe Haus: Ein Jahr im Parlament, reflecting on a year sitting in meetings of the German parliament Bundestag.

He died of cancer on 7 February 2016, aged 60.

== Writings ==
- Robert Musil. Piper, München, Zürich 1985, ISBN 3-492-05208-8
- Deutschlandreise. Eichborn, Frankfurt am Main 2002, ISBN 3-8218-0718-0
- Afghanische Reise. Fischer, Frankfurt am Main 2006, ISBN 3-10-092103-8
- Momentum. Fischer, Frankfurt am Main 2012, ISBN 978-3-10-092107-9
- Es war einmal oder nicht. Afghanische Kinder und ihre Welt. S. Fischer Verlag, Frankfurt am Main 2013, ISBN 978-3-10-092108-6
- Das Hohe Haus: Ein Jahr im Parlament. Fischer, Frankfurt am Main 2014, ISBN 978-3-10-092109-3.
