= Dunja Hayali =

German journalist and television presenter

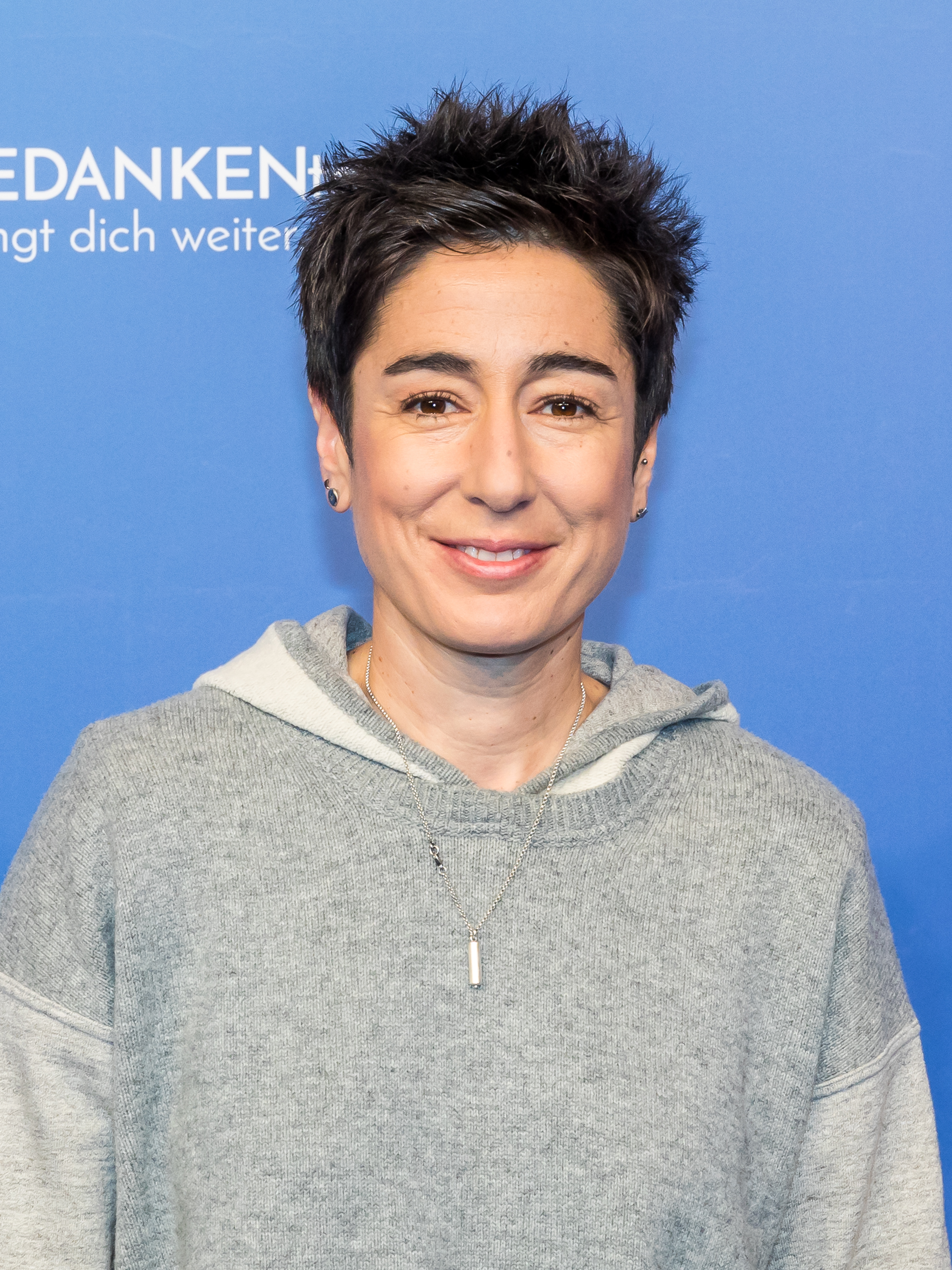
- Hayali in 2018
- Born: 6 June 1974 (age 52); Datteln, West Germany
- Occupations: Journalist, TV presenter
- Partner: Mareike Arning (2007–2011)

Dunja Hayali (born 6 June 1974) is a German journalist and television presenter for public broadcaster ZDF. She has an interest in sports, and is also known for her social activism.

== Early life and education ==
Hayali is the daughter of Assyrians from Mosul. Her mother is Chaldean Catholic, and her father is Syriac Orthodox. Hayali herself was a Catholic and was an altar server when she was young. However, she has left the church. Her parents initially moved from Baghdad to Vienna, Austria, to study medicine and pharmacy. At the time of Hayali's birth, her father ran his own practice in Datteln, where her mother helped out. Hayali's older brother is also a doctor, and her older sister first worked as a physician's assistant and later in a hospital.

In her youth, Hayali intensively pursued various sports. She played volleyball and soccer, trained judo and played tennis as a competitive sport until the age of 15.

Hayali studied at the German Sport University in Cologne from 1995 to 1999, majoring in "Media and Communication". During her studies, she completed internships at German radio and television stations.

== Career ==
=== Early beginnings ===
After graduation, Hayali worked as a sports presenter for Deutsche Welle in Cologne and Bonn, as a freelancer for the private station Radio Cologne and as a presenter of the news program Journal on DW-TV in Berlin. Additionally, she presented some sports and news broadcasts on tv.nrw, a regional TV station in North Rhine-Westphalia that ceased operations in mid-2005.

=== ZDF, 2007–present ===
In April 2007, Hayali became the anchor of ZDF's daily news programme heute, including both the weekday heute – in Deutschland and the weekend editions. She was also a co-anchor of the heute-journal, usually with chief anchor Steffen Seibert.

Hayali has also been hosting the ZDF Morning Magazine since October 2007. In October 2010 she succeeded Patricia Schäfer as chief anchor of the second half of the programme, from 7 to 9 am. Her last appearance as co-host on heute-journal was on 21 September 2010.

In summer 2015 and 2016, Hayali stood in for Maybrit Illner as host of the ZDF program ZDFdonnerstalk. The talk magazine was broadcast seven times in 2017 under the new title Dunja Hayali. From July 2018, it was broadcast once a month. In 2021, the show was discontinued.

In 2023, Hayali re-joined the heute-journal, this time as anchor in rotation with Marietta Slomka, Christian Sievers and Anne Gellinek.

Among other international leaders, Hayali has interviewed Chancellor Angela Merkel of Germany (2012), Chancellor Sebastian Kurz of Austria (2018) and former U.S. Secretary of State John Kerry (2021). In addition to her work for ZDF, she has also been a presenter at events such as the 2012 Berlin Conference on Renewable Energy, organised by the German Association of Energy and Water Industries (Bundesverband der Energie- und Wasserwirtschaft).

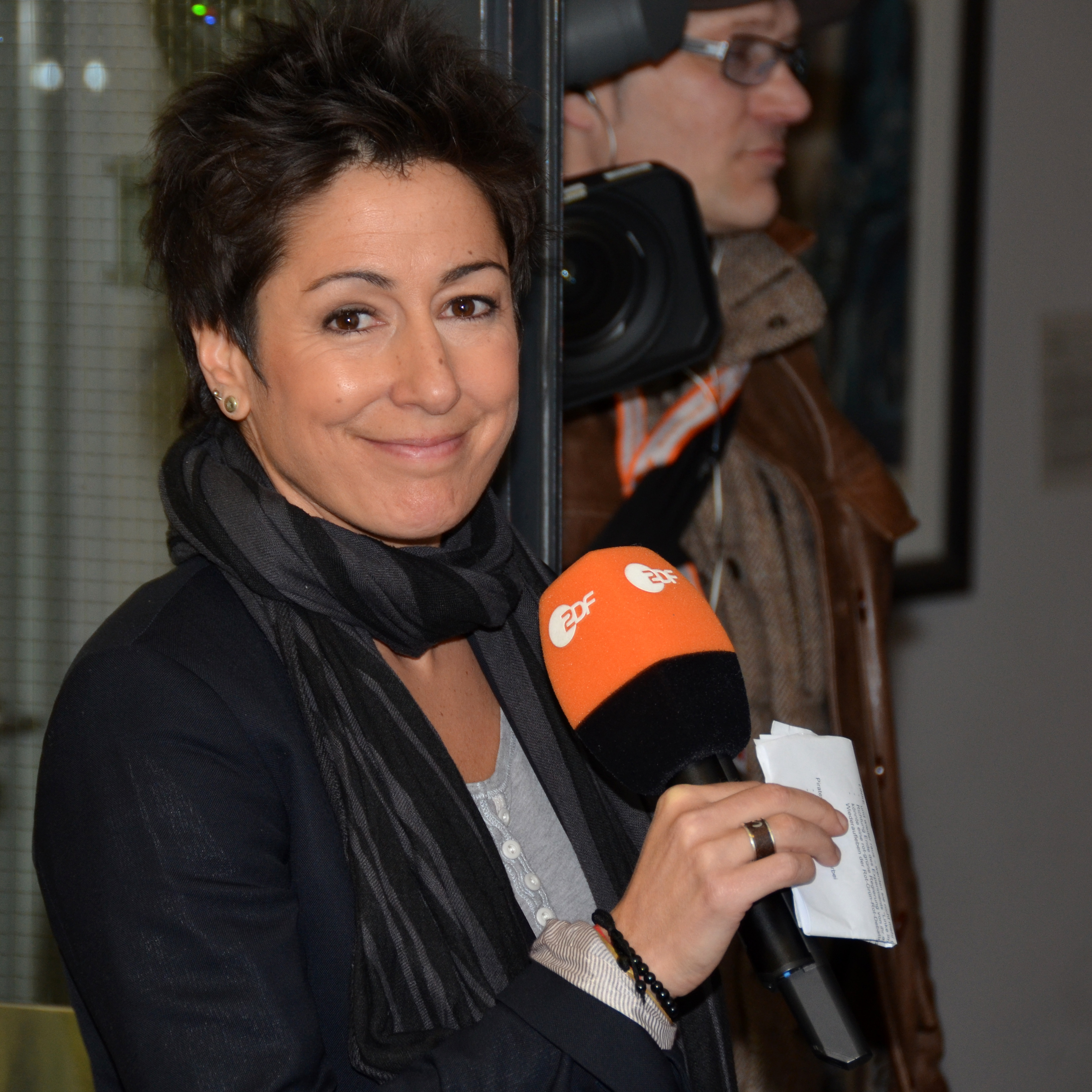
Hayali in 2013

== Other activities ==
- DFL Foundation, Member of the Board of Trustees (since 2017)
- Save the Children Germany, Member of the Supervisory Board (since 2015)

== Public engagement ==
=== Commitment to Open Dialogue ===
In March 2017, Hayali gave an interview to the weekly newspaper Junge Freiheit. In it, she pleaded for open dialogue regardless of political positions: "We must be able to put up with each other's opinions without immediately denigrating them or getting personal." She called for journalists to treat citizens with understanding and respect and vice versa. Although journalists will sometimes make mistakes, this is not automatically fake news. The interview led to controversial reactions. Heribert Prantl, German journalist and jurist, spoke of a mistake, since Hayali was paving the way for a new readership for the newspaper that "does not necessarily feel at home on the far right." Jan Fleischhauer, also a German journalist, countered that anyone who was not a politician did not have to worry about driving up the newspaper's circulation: "They do their thing. They ask me, I give them an answer." Hayali commented on the criticism on Twitter.

=== Commitment to children and young people ===
Dunja Hayali has been a member of the Board of Trustees of the DFL Foundation, a charitable foundation dedicated to social projects since 2017.

=== Commitment against hate speech ===
In her speech at the awards ceremony of the Goldene Kamera award on 6 February 2016, she also addressed the hatred she has been facing for some time. She said, "In a country where freedom of expression is such a high good, everyone is allowed and must be able to express their concerns and their fears without immediately being put in the right-wing Nazi corner. However, if you make racist comments, then you are a racist, dammit." She received a standing ovation in the hall for her speech.

=== Commitment against racism and xenophobia ===
Hayali is a supporter of the association Gesicht Zeigen! As an ambassador, she supports the initiative Respekt! Kein Platz für Rassismus. In 2018, Hayali was awarded the Order of Merit of the Federal Republic of Germany for her commitment against racism and xenophobia.

== Criticism and orders from the industry ==
Dunja Hayali was criticized because, in addition to her job as a journalist, she also moderated trade conventions for companies and events in the gambling industry. She received money from Amazon and BMW, among others. This was reported in 2018 by the media magazine Zapp from NDR. She herself does not see this as a loss of impartiality in her critical work as a professional journalist, as it is not a matter of advertising appearances. "I often make myself available on a voluntary basis or ask to donate the intended honorarium", she emphasized. "Just as, by the way, I donate any prize money I receive through awards."

== Awards ==
- 2016: Goldene Kamera in the category Best Information
- 2016: Robert-Geisendörfer-Preis: Special jury prize for exemplary journalistic or artistic achievements
- 2016: Order of Merit of North Rhine-Westphalia
- 2016: Annemarie Renger Award of the Arbeiter-Samariter-Bund Deutschland
- 2017: Radio Regenbogen Award for Media Woman 2016
- 2017: Theodor Heuss Medal of the Theodor Heuss Foundation
- 2018: Benedict Prize of Mönchengladbach for value-oriented and against the background of the Christian-occidental experiences in a special way outstanding action
- 2018: Order of Merit of the Federal Republic of Germany
- 2019: "Die Blaue Zunge"
- 2020: Tolerance Award of the Protestant Academy of Tutzing in the category Civil Courage
- 2020: Walter Lübcke Democracy Award (together with Robert Erkan and the "Mobile Counseling System against Right-Wing Extremism and Racism - for Democratic Culture in Hesse")

== Personal life ==
Hayali has extensive tattoos on her right arm and back; these were first seen at the presentation of the Deutscher Fernsehpreis on 9 October 2010 in Cologne; on television they had always been covered.

Hayali is lesbian; in 2008 she announced that since 2007 she had been in a relationship with Mareike Arning, the vocalist of the punk-pop band Uschi's Orchester. The couple separated in 2011.

In February 2016, the State Court of Hamburg issued a preliminary injunction forbidding a Facebook user from making offensive hate comments on Hayali's Facebook page and setting a fine of up to €250,000 for any violations of the injunction. Hayali lives in Berlin-Kreuzberg.

== Publications ==
- with Elena Senft. Is' was, Dog? Mein Leben mit Hund und Haaren. Berlin: Ullstein, 2014, ISBN 978-3-86493-021-8; 2015, ISBN 978-3-548-37592-2 (in German).
- Haymatland: Wie wollen wir zusammenleben?. Berlin: Ullstein, 2018 ISBN 978-3-550-20017-5
