= Bettina Schausten =

German journalist

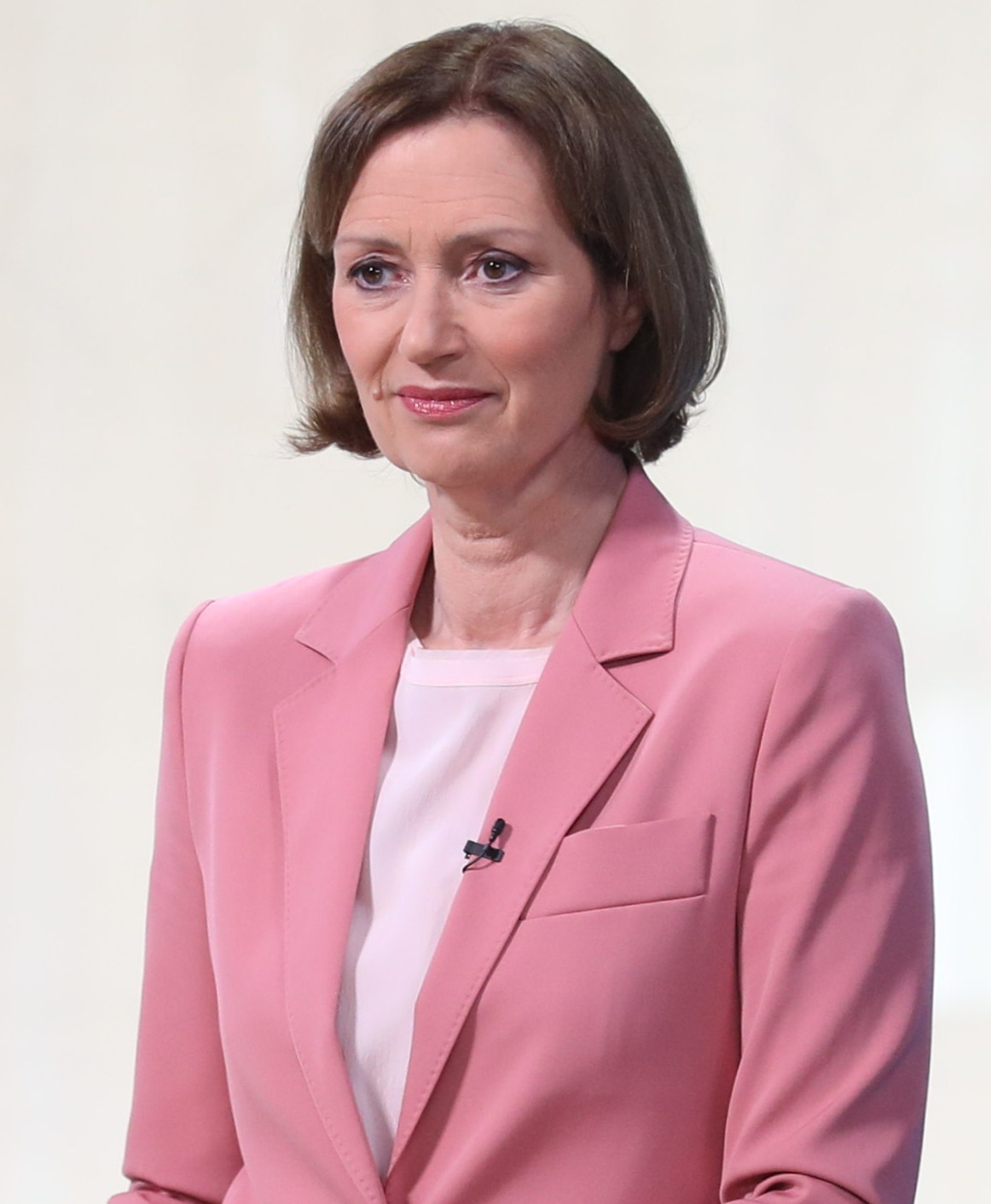
- Schausten at the 2022 Saarland state elections
- Born: 18 February 1965 (age 61); Lüdinghausen, Germany
- Occupation: Journalist
- Spouse: Thomas Fuhrmann (m. 2008)
- Awards: See Awards

Bettina Schausten (born 18 February 1965, in Lüdinghausen) is a German journalist.

== Early life and education ==
Schausten studied literature, history and Catholic theology in Cologne and in Munich from 1986 to 1992.

== Career ==
From 1992 to 1996 Schausten worked for German broadcaster SWF as a television reporter.

In 1996, Schausten moved to German broadcaster ZDF and soon worked as chief of staff to editor-in-chief Klaus Bresser. She later presented of the channel's morning show, ZDF-Morgenmagazin, from 1999 to 2002 and Politbarometer from 2003 to 2010. From 2010 until 2019, she led the ZDF bureau in Berlin; she was the first woman in that position.

Since March 2019 Schausten has been serving as deputy editor-in-chief of ZDF, alongside editor-in-chief Peter Frey. In addition, she has occasionally been the anchor of ZDF's daily news show heute-journal since July 2020, filling in for Claus Kleber, Marietta Slomka and Christian Sievers.

During her time at ZDF, Schausten notably was one of the few TV journalists who conducted interviews with Chancellor Angela Merkel almost annually: in 2010, 2012, 2013, 2014, 2015, 2016, 2017, 2018 and 2020. In 2013, she produced a documentary on Merkel.

== Awards ==
- 2009: Deutscher Fernsehpreis

== Personal life ==
Schausten has been married to German ZDF journalist Thomas Fuhrmann.
