= Klaus-Peter Siegloch =

Former German journalist and lobbyist

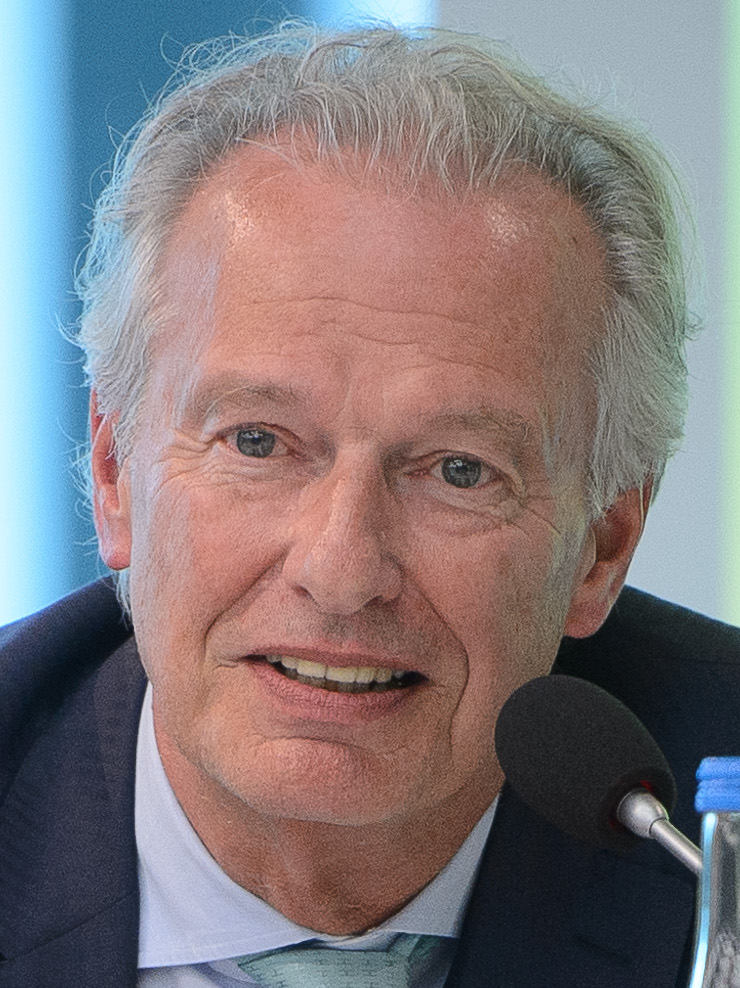
- Siegloch in 2015
- Born: 15 May 1946 (age 80)
- Occupations: Journalist; Lobbyist
- Awards: See Awards

Klaus-Peter Siegloch (born 15 May 1946) is a German former journalist and lobbyist.

== Life ==
Siegloch was born in Hamburg. He studied sociology, economics and political science at the University of Hamburg, graduating in 1973. Siegloch worked as a television journalist between 1973 and 2011, for German public broadcaster ARD from 1973 to 1988 and from 1988 to 2011 for ZDF.

His professional career began in 1973, as an editor at NDR, where he worked on the Tagesschau and on regional broadcasts; from 1982 to 1985, he also presented news magazine Tagesthemen. Siegloch moved to ZDF in 1988, where he became head of the main editorial department for domestic affairs, working on such programmes as the Politbarometer. Siegloch became the head of ZDF's Bonn studio in 1991, before becoming deputy editor-in-chief of ZDF's news the following year. From 1995 to 1999, Siegloch was ZDF's chief Washington correspondent. In 1999, Siegloch became chief presenter of the 7pm heute news, alternating with Petra Gerster. From 2003 onwards, he was deputy editor-in-chief of ZDF, and head of the news department; alongside these duties, he presented Heute Journal between 2003 and 2007, acting as a regular substitute for Marietta Slomka and Claus Kleber.

In June 2007, Siegloch returned to Washington, where he once again became chief Washington, D.C. correspondent. From December 2008, he was head of the ZDF office in New York, responsible for reporting on Wall Street, the United Nations, and Canada. Siegloch retired from ZDF in April 2011 for age reasons. He went on to become president of the German Aviation Association (BDL), a position which he held until April 2016. Besides his profession, he was member of the Board of Trustees of the Bertelsmann Stiftung, for example.

Siegloch is married and has two children.

== Awards ==
- 1989: Herbert Quandt Medien Prize
- 1998: TV-Prize by RIAS-Berlin-Kommission
