= Petra Gerster =

German journalist and news presenter

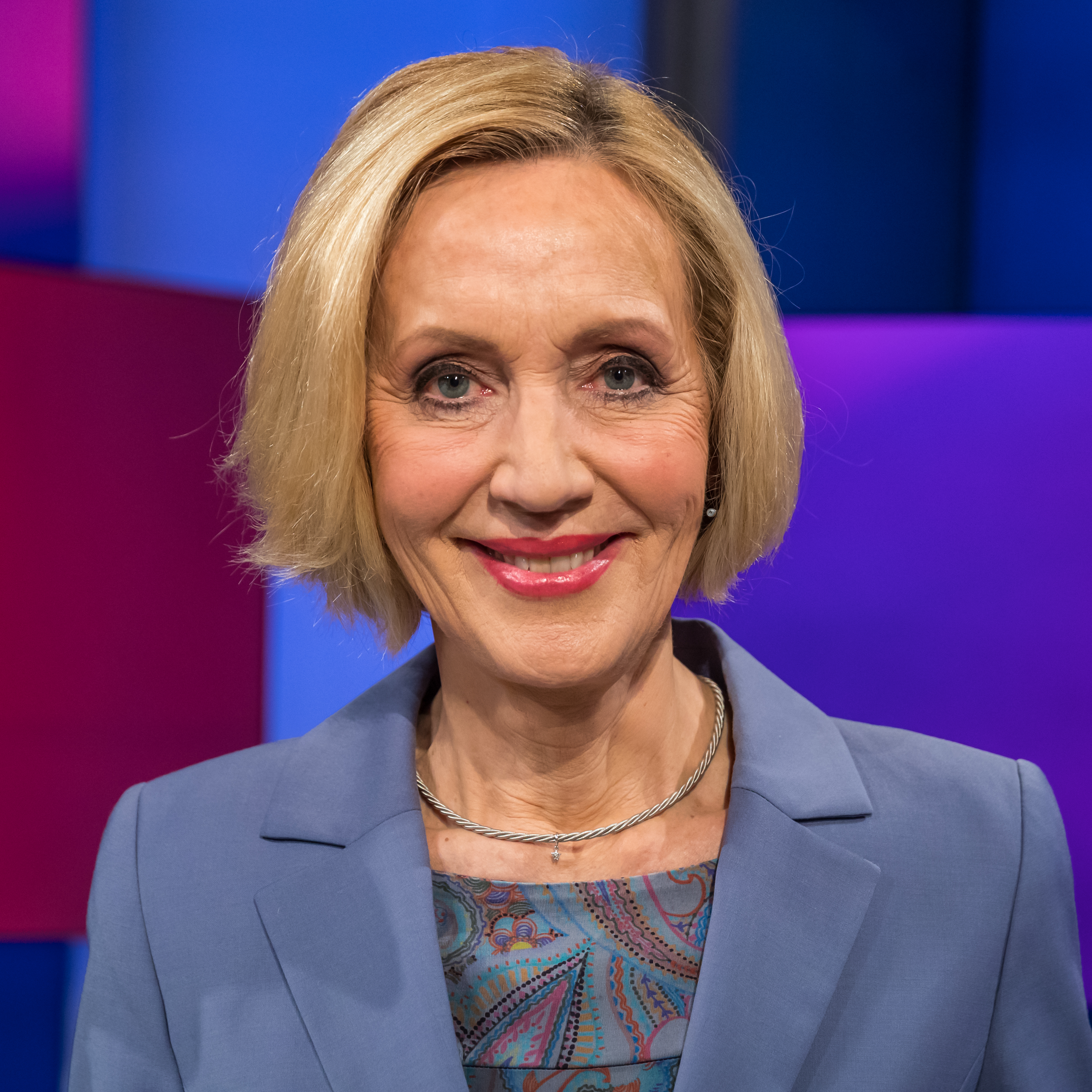
- Gerster in 2025
- Born: Petra Gerster; 25 January 1955 (age 71); Worms, Rhineland-Palatinate, West Germany (now Germany)
- Occupation: German television presenter
- Spouse: Christian Nürnberger
- Children: 2

Petra Gerster (German pronunciation: [ˈpeːtʁa ˈgɛɐ̯stɐ]; born 25 January 1955) is a German journalist and news presenter.

== Early life and education ==
Starting in 1973, Gerster studied German studies, Slavic studies, and literature with a grant of the German Academic Scholarship Foundation at the University of Konstanz, as well as in the US and in Paris. In 1981 she received a Master of Arts.

== Career ==
Gerster began her career as a newspaper journalist with Kölner Stadt-Anzeiger. From 1989, she worked as a TV journalist for ZDF. She was a presenter on the German women's magazine show Mona Lisa for ten years.

From 1998 until 2021, Gerster worked as anchor for ZDF's daily news magazine heute, in rotation with Peter Hahne (1998–1999), Klaus-Peter Siegloch (1999–2003), Steffen Seibert (2003–2010), Matthias Fornoff (2010–2014) and Christian Sievers (2014–2021).

== Other activities ==
- Witten/Herdecke University, Member of the Supervisory Board
- Hertie Foundation, Member of the Board of Trustees
- Wormser Dom, Member of the Board of Trustees

== Personal life ==
Gerster is the sister of politician Florian Gerster and is married to journalist and politician Christian Nürnberger. They live in Mainz.

== Literature ==
- Petra Gerster, Christian Nürnberger: Der Erziehungsnotstand. Wie wir die Zukunft unserer Kinder retten. Berlin (Rowohlt Verlag). 2002. ISBN 3-87134-433-8
- Petra Gerster, Christian Nürnberger: Stark für das Leben. Wege aus dem Erziehungsnotstand. Berlin (Rowohlt Verlag). 2003. ISBN 3-87134-464-8
- Petra Gerster: Reifeprüfung: Die Frau von 50 Jahren. Berlin (Rowohlt Verlag). 2007. ISBN 978-3-87134-533-3
- Petra Gerster, Andrea Stoll: Ihrer Zeit voraus. Frauen verändern die Welt. Munich (cbj Verlag). 2009. ISBN 978-3-570-13403-0
- Petra Gerster, Christian Nürnberger: Charakter: Worauf es bei Bildung wirklich ankommt, Berlin (Rowohlt Verlag). 2010. ISBN 978-3-87134-679-8
- Petra Gerster: Es wächst zusammen... Wir Deutschen und die Einheit. Cologne (Lingen Verlag), 2010. ISBN 978-3-938323-61-8

== Awards ==
- 1996: Hanns-Joachim-Friedrichs-Award
