= Burns Fellowship =

Burns Fellowship or Burns Fellow may refer to:

- Arthur F. Burns Fellowship, organized by the International Center for Journalists; awardees include Anne Gellinek
- Robert Burns Fellowship, University of Otago, a New Zealand literary fellowship
