= Höttges =

Höttges is a surname. Notable people with the surname include:

- Horst-Dieter Höttges (born 1943), German footballer
- Timotheus Höttges (born 1962), German businessman
