= Hildegard von Bingen Prize for Journalism =

German journalism award

The Hildegard von Bingen Prize for Journalism (Hildegard-von-Bingen-Preis für Publizistik) is an annual journalism award. Since 1995, it is awarded by the Board of Trustees of the Hildegard von Bingen Prize. Former award winners are members of the Board of Trustees. The award was founded in 1995 by the biographer and journalist Helmut Ahrens. A publicist is honored "for an outstanding, professionally and culturally important journalistic individual achievement or a life's work." The prize money is €10,000. The prize is awarded in Mainz. The award is named after the medieval abbess Hildegard von Bingen. The abbess was convinced that writing and word have their own effect.

== Recipients ==
- 1995 Walter Kannengießer
- 1996 Helmut Markwort
- 1997 Gabriele Krone-Schmalz
- 1998 Johannes Gross
- 1999 Peter Scholl-Latour
- 2000 Joachim Fest
- 2001 Joachim Kaiser
- 2002 Sandra Maischberger
- 2003 Harald Schmidt
- 2004 Claus Kleber
- 2005 Gerhard Stadelmaier
- 2006 Maybrit Illner
- 2007 Giovanni di Lorenzo
- 2008 Henryk M. Broder
- 2009 Necla Kelek
- 2010 Fritz J. Raddatz
- 2011 Felicitas von Lovenberg
- 2012 Antonia Rados
- 2013 Gustav Seibt
- 2014 Denis Scheck
- 2015 Juli Zeh
- 2016 Ulrich Wilhelm
- 2017 Theo Koll
- 2018 Anja Reschke
