= Politbarometer =

German election poll and TV programme

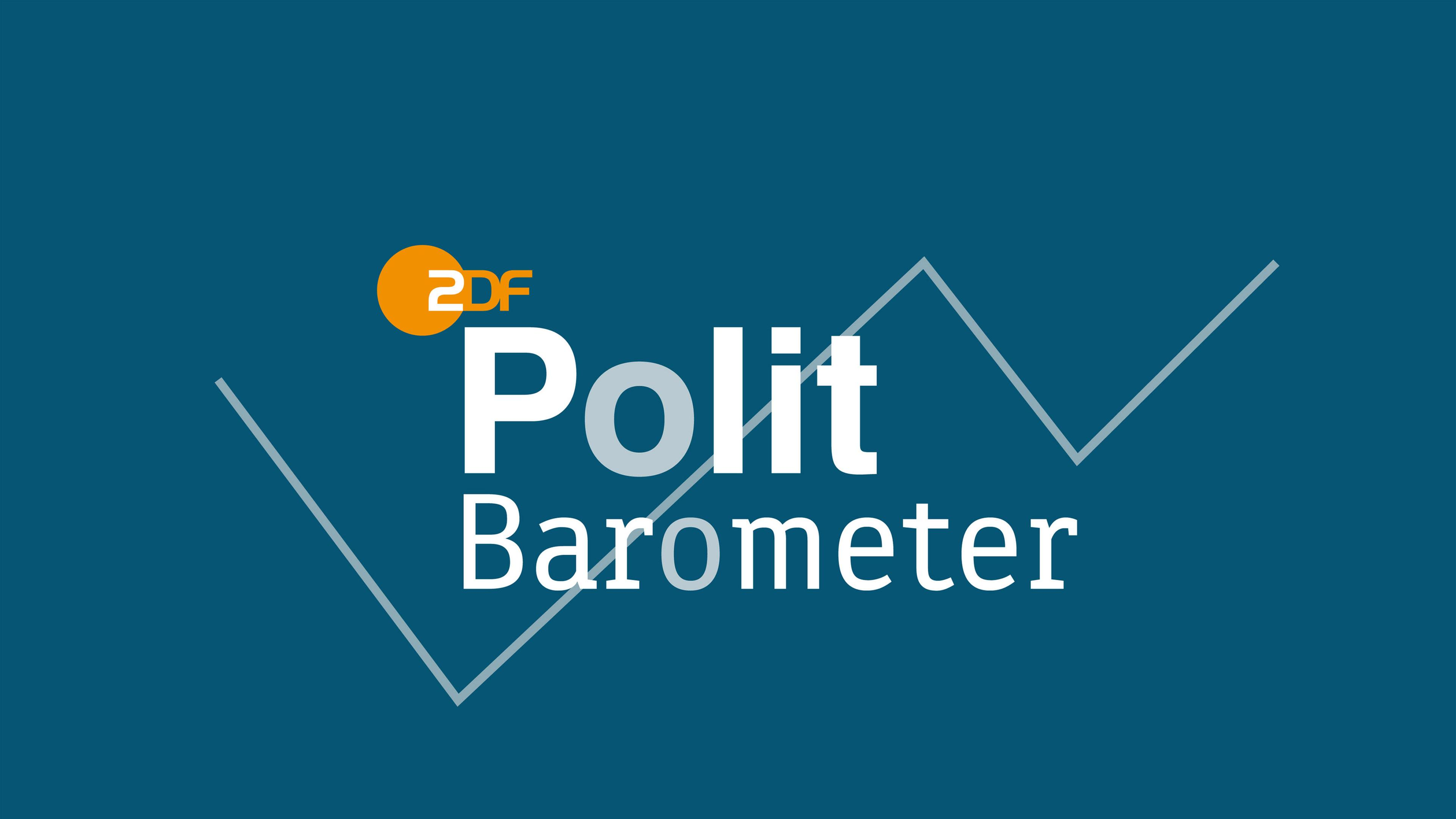
Logo

The Politbarometer (lit. political barometer) is a long-standing German election poll and television program on ZDF. The program is aired monthly, usually on Friday evenings. During the program, the survey results are presented. The survey is conducted since 1977 by Forschungsgruppe Wahlen (FGW).

The polling of the Politbarometer includes:

- The "political mood" in Germany
- The projection - "if next Sunday were federal elections" (Sonntagsfrage, lit. "Sunday question")
- Ratings of the most important politicians
- Survey on current topics from politics and business

== Presenters ==
=== Current presenters ===
- since 2014: Matthias Fornoff
- since 2014: Antje Pieper (substitute)

=== Former presenters ===
- until 2010: Bettina Schausten
- 2010–2014: Theo Koll
- Detlef Sprickmann
- Horst Schättle
- Klaus Bresser
- Klaus-Peter Siegloch
- Barbara Groth
- Thomas Bellut
- Ralph Schumacher (substitute)

== Literature ==
- Andreas M. Wüst (ed.): Politbarometer. Leske + Budrich, Opladen 2003.
