= Theo Koll =

German journalist and television moderator

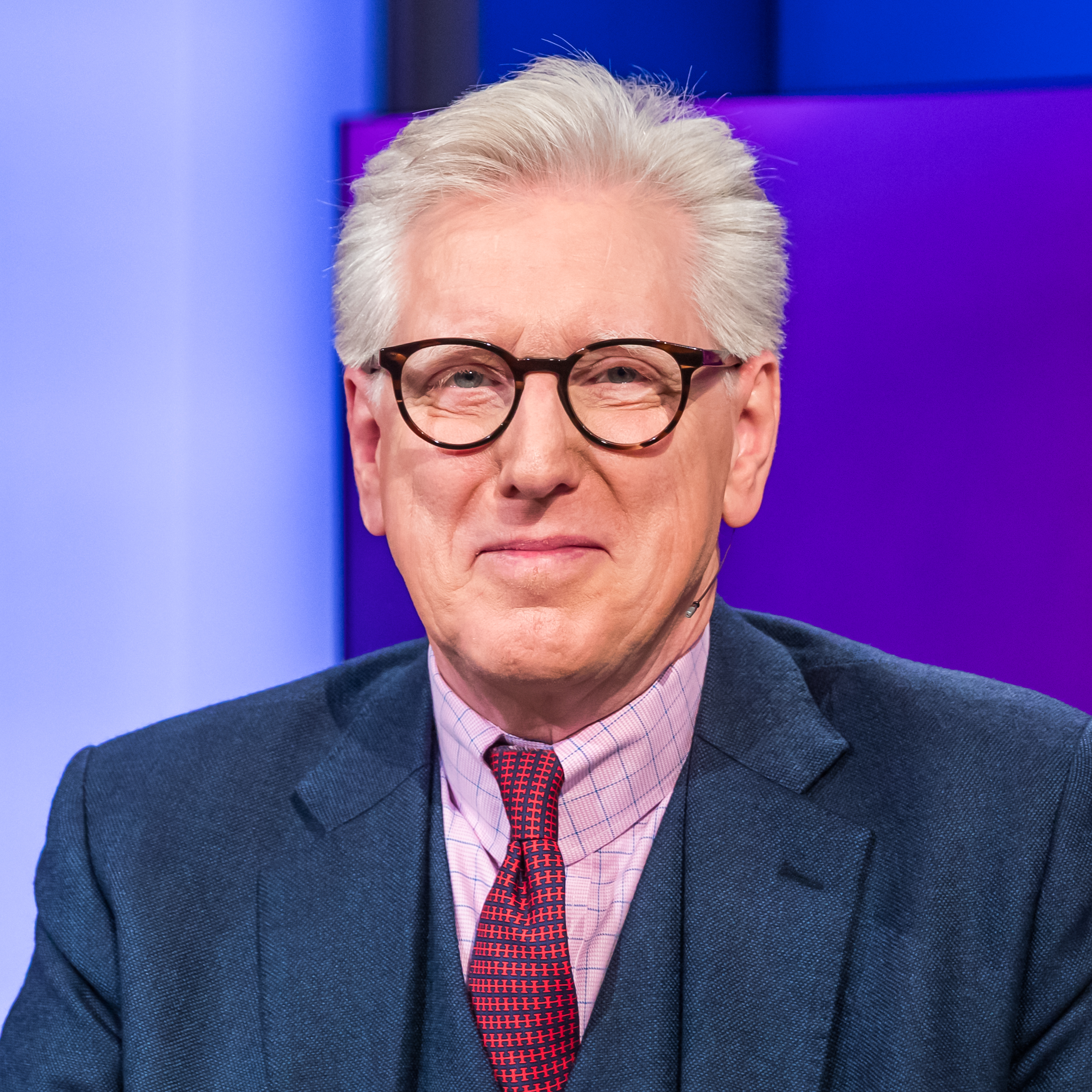
- Koll in 2026
- Born: 19 March 1958 (age 68); Bensberg, Bergisch Gladbach, North Rhine-Westphalia, Germany
- Education: University of Bonn
- Occupations: Journalist; Television presenter
- Awards: See Awards

Theo Koll (born 19 March 1958) is a German journalist and television presenter.

== Early life and education ==
Koll was born on 19 March 1958 in Bensberg, Bergisch Gladbach, North Rhine-Westphalia, Germany. From 1977 to 1985, he studied political science, modern history, sociology and constitutional law at the University of Bonn, as well as in London, Paris and Hamburg with a master's degree.

== Career ==
Koll has been working for Zweites Deutsches Fernsehen (ZDF) since 1990. He led the program's London bureau from 1993 to 2001. From 2001 to 2019, he presented political journal Frontal. In addition, he presented the theater magazine Foyer on 3sat from October 2006 to April 2010, alternating with Esther Schweins.

On 1 July 2014, Koll moved to Paris as the studio manager of ZDF. In 2016, was one of the final candidates considered for the leadership of public broadcaster RBB; the position eventually went to Patricia Schlesinger instead. On 1 March 2019, he took over the management of the ZDF capital studio in Berlin, succeeding Bettina Schausten.

== Personal life ==
Koll was in a relationship with Monika Grütters. He is married to Franziska Castell.

== Awards ==
- 2005: Bayerischer Fernsehpreis as moderator und ensemble member of Frontal 21
- 2006: Hanns-Joachim-Friedrichs-Preis as moderator and ensemble member of Frontal 21
- 2007: Goldener Prometheus as Fernsehjournalist des Jahres (Television Journalist of the Year)
- 2007: Goldene Kamera in the category Bestes Polit-Magazin (Leserwahl) (Best Polit Magazine (Reader's Election)) as ensemble member of Frontal 21
- 2008: B.A.U.M.-Umweltpreis in the category Medienvertreter (Media Representative) as ensemble member of Frontal 21
- 2013: Deutscher Fernsehpreis in the category Beste Information (Best Information) as ensemble member of auslandsjournal XXL: Brasilien
- 2017: Hildegard von Bingen Prize for Journalism
