= Gabriele Krone-Schmalz =

German broadcast journalist and author (born 1949)

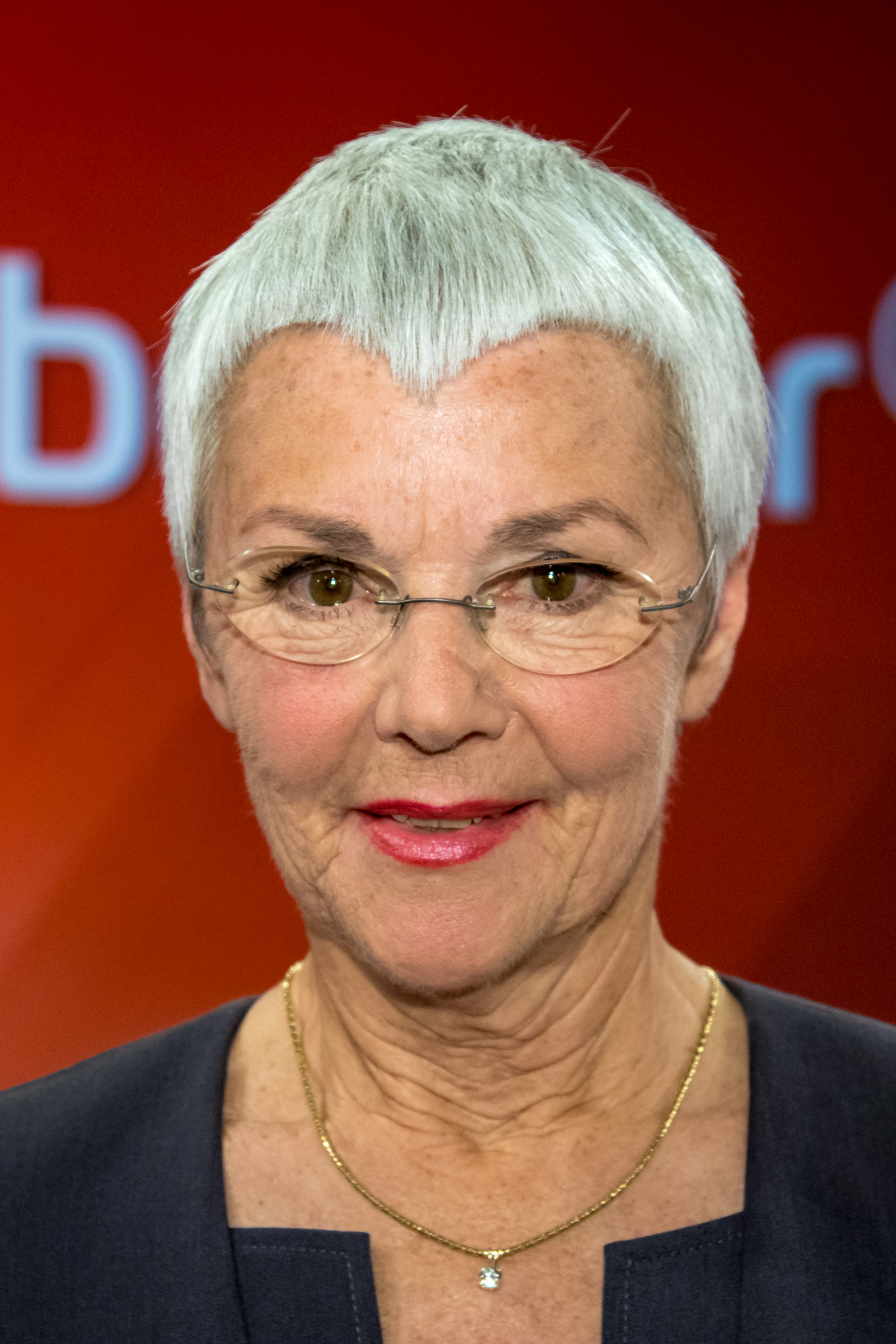
- Krone-Schmalz in 2018
- Born: 8 November 1949 (age 77); Lam, District of Cham, Bavaria, West Germany
- Occupations: Journalist, author
- Known for: Reporting on Russia

Gabriele Krone-Schmalz (born 8 November 1949 in Lam, District of Cham, Bavaria) is a German broadcast journalist and author.

== Biography ==
With an academic background in Eastern European history, political science, and Slavic studies, Krone-Schmalz holds a doctorate in history and political science. Since 1976, she has worked primarily for various radio and television broadcasts of the West German broadcasting company Westdeutscher Rundfunk.

Krone-Schmalz worked at the Moscow studio of ARD broadcasting from 1987 to 1992. Between 1992 and 1997, she hosted the world culture programming of the ARD. Since then, she has been self-employed as a freelance journalist.

In 2008 she was awarded the Pushkin Medal of the Russian Federation.

In her 2015 book "Understanding Russia: The Battle for Ukraine and the Arrogance of the West", Krone-Schmalz justified Russian occupation of Crimea as defensive in nature.

In September 2026, the Bündnis Sahra Wagenknecht (BSW) proposed Krone-Schmalz as its candidate for Federal President. The proposal was made ahead of the 2027 presidential election, with the BSW stating that it would support her candidacy in the Federal Convention.

== Books ==
- 1993: Russland wird nicht untergehen... (Russia Will Not Stand Down), ECON Verlag, ISBN 3-430-15697-1
- 2000: An Russland muss man einfach glauben. Meine Moskauer Jahre. (You Simply Must Believe in Russia. My Years in Moscow), ECON-Verlag, ISBN 3-612-26012-X
- 2007: Was passiert in Russland (What Is Happening in Russia), Herbig-Verlag, 1. Auflage, 29. September 2007, ISBN 3-7766-2525-2
- 2015: Russland verstehen: Der Kampf um die Ukraine und die Arroganz des Westens (Understanding Russia: The Battle for Ukraine and the Arrogance of the West), ISBN 978-3-406-67525-6

== Career recognition ==
- 1987 Adolf-Grimme-Preis, Live special award in silver for Drei vor Mitternacht (Three before midnight, German)
- 1989 German Critics' Prize for Kraftakte – Frauenalltag in der Sowjetunion (Women's Everyday Life in the Soviet Union, ARD film)
- 1990 Golden Gong for KGB-Verbrechen und Glasnost (KGB Crimes and Glasnost, ARD film)
- 1997 Hildegard von Bingen Prize for Journalism
- 1997 Waldschmidt Prize of the Bavarian Forest Association
- 1997 Order of Merit of the Federal Republic of Germany, 1st class
- 2008 Pushkin Medal
