= Wolf von Lojewski =

German journalist

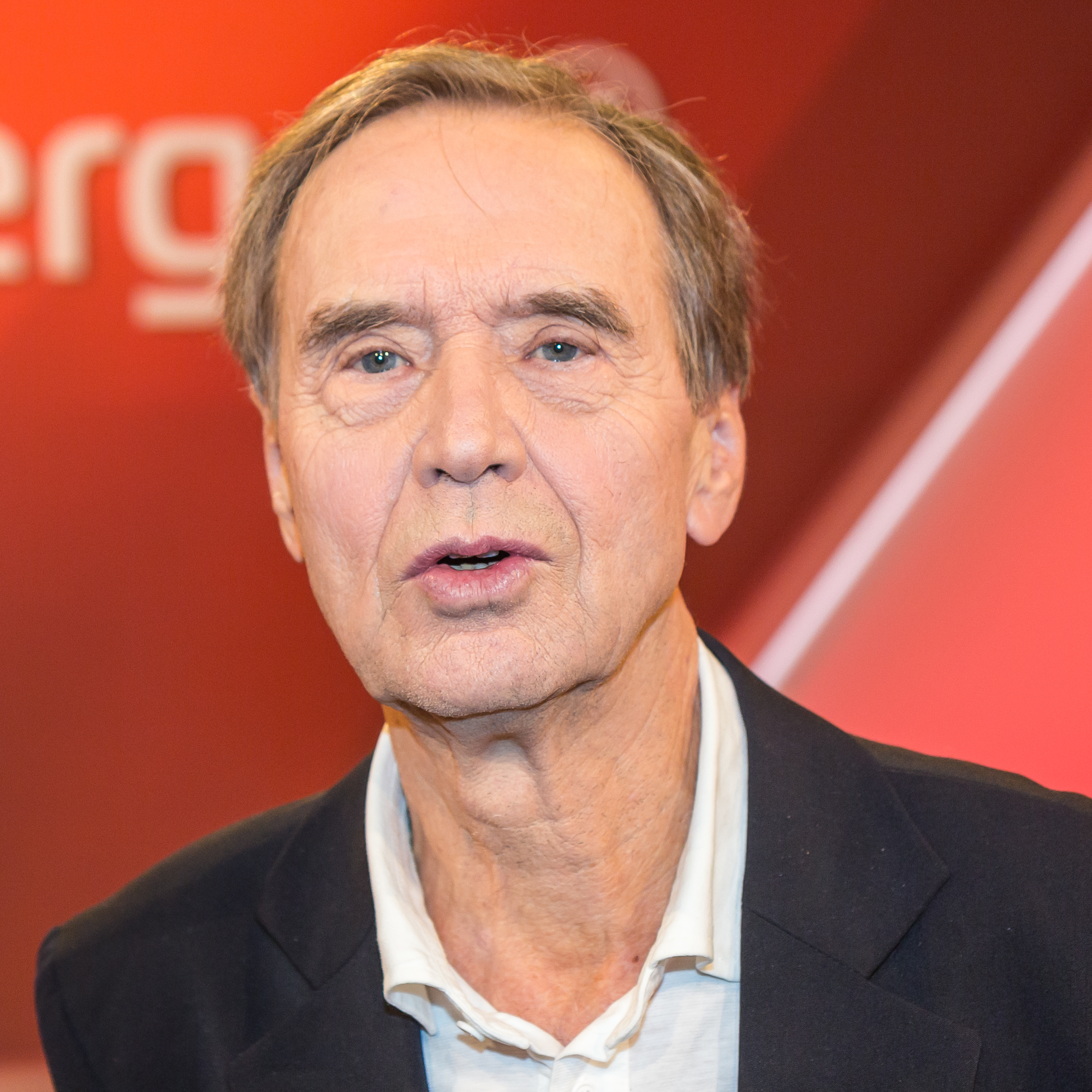
Wolf von Lojewski, 2016

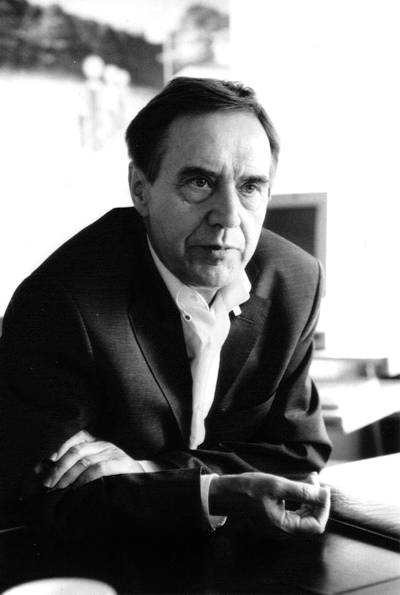
Wolf von Lojewski

Wolf von Lojewski (born 4 July 1937) is a German journalist.

== Life ==
Lojewski was born in Berlin and studied German law. Later he worked as a journalist for German public broadcasters NDR, ARD and ZDF. From 1 March 1992 until 2 January 2003 he presented the heute-journal on ZDF. Lojewski has written several books on his life as a journalist.

== Works ==
- 1991: Amerika: Ein Traum vom neuen Leben
- 2001: Live dabei. Erinnerungen eines Journalisten
- 2006: Der schöne Schein der Wahrheit. Politiker, Journalisten und der Umgang mit den Medien

== Awards ==
- 1983 – Goldener Gong for Rund um Big Ben
- 1994 – Goldene Kamera
- 1995 – Telestar Best moderation documentation/news for heute-journal
- 1999 – Hanns Joachim Friedrichs Award
- 2003 – Carl Zuckmayer Medal
- 2008 – Bayerischer Fernsehpreis for Meine Heimat - Deine Heimat
