= Andreas Wil Gerdes =

German businessman

Andreas Wilhelm Gerdes
- Born: 10 September 1970 (age 55); Münster, Germany
- Occupations: entrepreneur, digital nomad, consultor

Andreas Wilhelm Gerdes is a German entrepreneur, digital nomad, consultor and benefactor based in Malta. He has been one of the speakers at the Kairos Society, and is a consultant on the MaNaBu educational project. He was involved in the project to make Andes, New York, one of the first towns with free and extensive Wi-Fi coverage in the United States.

== Biography ==
Gerdes was born in Münster, Germany, on September 10, 1970. In elementary school he was one of only eight male students, among 1000 female students. Gerdes affirms “it was a collaborative environment, so that is why it feels more natural to me. Gerdes founded in the mid-1980s, in Germany, a company in the field of telecommunications together with René Obermann. The business was partially bought by Hutchison Whampoa in 1992, and renamed Hutchinson Telecom (now The Phone House Deutschland). Later, in 1998, the company was bought by Orange PLC.

The Kairos EU Summit (an international invite-only event that seeks to serve as a space for international think leaders, Funded by Kairos) has featured Gerdes as a special guest several times since 2014, the last one being in 2019. Gerdes is also involved as a consultant in MaNaBu, a non-profit educational project dedicated to teach children through an online platform and videos. Gerdes is the serial entrepreneur of this project, which seeks to reach some of the UN's SDGs.

Gerdes nowadays works as a digital-nomad both in Malta and Croatia, where he also financially and technologically backs local start-ups. Besides being a vocal advocate for ethical food management, Gerdes is currently also a consultant on issues of parental custody and child rearing.

== Wi-Fi in Andes, New York ==
Gerdes arrived in the United States in 2005 from Malta, where he ran the iWorld Group, an incubator for mobile and information technology start-ups. After buying a house from the 19th century and adapting it to his technological demands, he dedicated himself during the summer of that year to also introduce Wi-Fi hotspots in the shops and public places of the town, starting with the library. Before the arrival of Gerdes, the town had mobile phone connection problems during the weekends (when the town's population increased), and extremely slow internet connections; but after Gerdes's donation, Andes became one of the first towns covered by a network of routers in the Eastern United States. After the library and some public spaces, Gerdes gave routers to some businesses along Main Street for free, and all agreed to share their access. This attracted press and tourism, and improved the economy of local businesses.

== Parental litigation ==
Gerdes' struggle to regain custody of his daughter after she was abducted by her mother (a Croatian national) caught the attention of the Maltese media in 2018. The 31-month-old girl was taken from Malta (where she lived in Marsaxlokk, with her father) by her mother with a new passport, after reporting the girl's original one as stolen, even though it was at Gerdes' house, On the new passport, she was stated as the sole parent. The girl settled with her mother in Zagreb, Croatia, where Gerdes was finally able to locate her and begin the legal process to acquire full parental custody of the child. This process was successfully closed in favor of Gerdes in 2019.
