= René Obermann =

German businessman (born 1963)

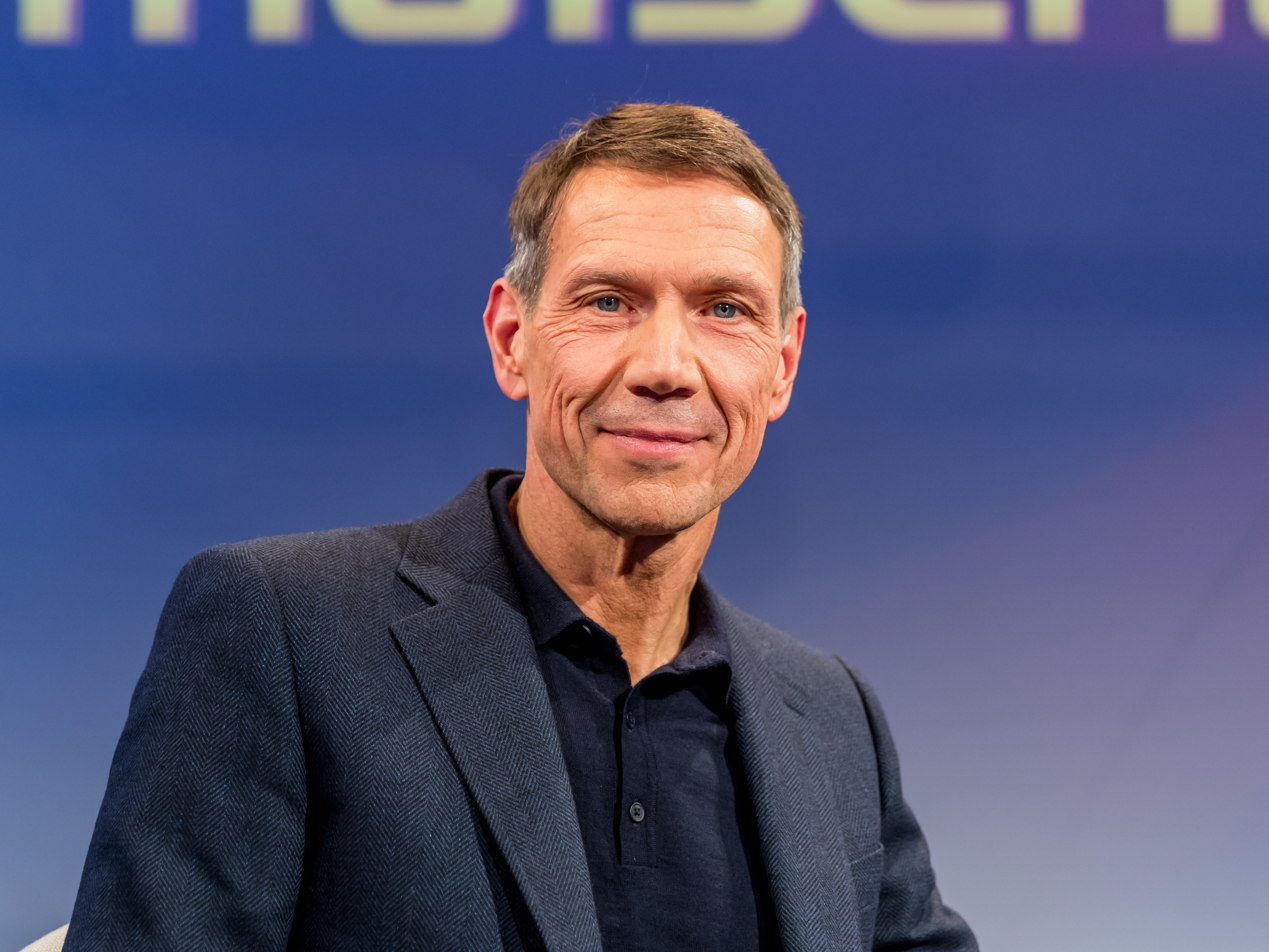
- Obermann in 2025
- Born: 5 March 1963 (age 63); Düsseldorf, West Germany
- Education: University of Münster
- Occupation: Chairman of the Board of Airbus
- Known for: CEO of Deutsche Telekom (2006–2013)
- Spouse: Maybrit Illner (m. 2010–2025)

René Obermann (born 5 March 1963) is a German businessman who is chairman of Warburg Pincus International LLC's European operations, and chairman of Airbus since April 2020. He was previously (from November 2006 to December 2013) CEO of Deutsche Telekom.

== Early life ==
Obermann was born in Düsseldorf and was raised in Krefeld. After graduating from high school and completing military service, where he spent two years in the air force, he started his professional career at BMW in Munich and completed a business apprenticeship programme in 1986. From 1986 to 1988, he studied economics at Westfälische Wilhelms-Universität in Münster.

== Career ==
Also in 1986, Obermann founded his own company ABC Telekom (now The Phone House Telecom GmbH), located in Münster, Germany. Andreas Gerdes was his business partner from 1988 to 1992.

He gave up studying after 2 years due to the successful development of ABC. In 1991, ABC Telekom merged with Hutchison Whampoa and became Hutchison Mobilfunk. Obermann was Managing Partner from 1992 to 1993 and Chief Executive Officer from 1993 to 1998.

After having sold his remaining shares, Obermann started his career at Deutsche Telekom Group, first at T-Mobile Deutschland GmbH as a Member of the Executive Board. From March 2000 to March 2002 he was CEO of T-Mobile Deutschland. In June 2001, he additionally became CEO Europe at T-Mobile International AG. In November 2002, he became Board Member of Deutsche Telekom AG and was then appointed as CEO of the group's mobile division, T-Mobile International AG. He took over the last two roles from Kai-Uwe Ricke who was appointed as CEO of Deutsche Telekom AG.

After Ricke had resigned in 2006, Obermann became the CEO of Deutsche Telekom AG. During Obermann's tenure as CEO, he was instrumental in obtaining an exclusive partnership from Apple Inc. for Deutsche Telekom to sell the original iPhone in Germany and in other European countries in late-2007. Other successes were the German market leadership, the merger of Orange UK and T-Mobile UK to Everything Everywhere (now EE Limited) and the merger of MetroPCS with T-Mobile USA in the US and its subsequent IPO. In 2012, Obermann also took over responsibility for innovation in the group.

From February 2007 to November 2013, Obermann was Vice President of Germany's digital association BITKOM.

Obermann left Deutsche Telekom in December 2013 and assumed the role of CEO of the Dutch cable and internet provider, Ziggo. His decision had already been published in 2012 – that he wanted to go back to a more operational role – back into the 'machine room' where he came from. In 2014, it was made public that Ziggo would become the takeover target of Liberty Global. Obermann announced that he would therefore leave the company upon completion of the merger, which took place at the end of 2014.

In February 2015, Obermann became Partner and Managing Director at Warburg Pincus International LLC. He is also a managing director of Warburg Pincus Deutschland GmbH.

In 2025, Federal Minister for Economic Affairs and Energy Katherina Reiche appointed Obermann as one of four external advisors – alongside Moritz Schularick, Nico Lange. and Jürgen-Joachim von Sandrart – on Germany's defence industry.

== Other activities ==
=== Corporate boards ===
- SAP, Member of the Supervisory Board (since 2026)
- Airbus Chairman of the Board of Directors (since 2020)
- Inmarsat, Non-Executive Member of the Board of Directors
- 1&1 Ionos, Chairman of the Supervisory Board (since 2017)
- Strato AG, Chairman of the Supervisory Board (since 2017)
- Telenor Group Member of the Board of Directors (2018–2019)
- Allianz Deutschland AG, Member of the Supervisory Board (2017–2020)
- inexio Beteiligungs GmbH & Co. KGaA, Member of the Supervisory Board (2017–2020)
- Die Zeit, Member of the Editorial Board (2017–2019)
- CompuGroup Medical, Member of the Supervisory Board (2015–2017)
- Spotify Technology, Member of the Supervisory Board (2014–2016)
- E.ON, Member of the Supervisory Board (2011–2016)
- ThyssenKrupp, Member of the Supervisory Board (2013–2018)

=== Non-profit organizations ===
- German Startups Association, Member of the Board of Trustees (since 2019)
- German Internet Economy Foundation, Member of the Advisory Board (since 2016)
- German Association for Information Technology, Telecommunications and New Media (BITKOM), Vice-President (2007–2013)

== Personal life ==
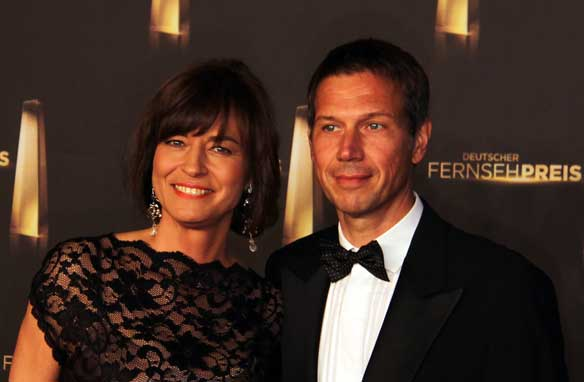
Obermann and Maybrit Illner at the 2012 German Television Awards

Obermann married German television presenter Maybrit Illner in August 2010. He also has two children from a previous marriage. The couple confirmed in November 2025 that they had separated.

Business positions
Preceded by Denis Ranque	Chairman of Airbus; 16 April 2020 – present	Current holder
Preceded by Kai-Uwe Ricke	Chief Executive of Deutsche Telekom; 13 November 2006 – 31 December 2013	Succeeded by Timotheus Höttges
