= Matthias Fornoff =

German television journalist

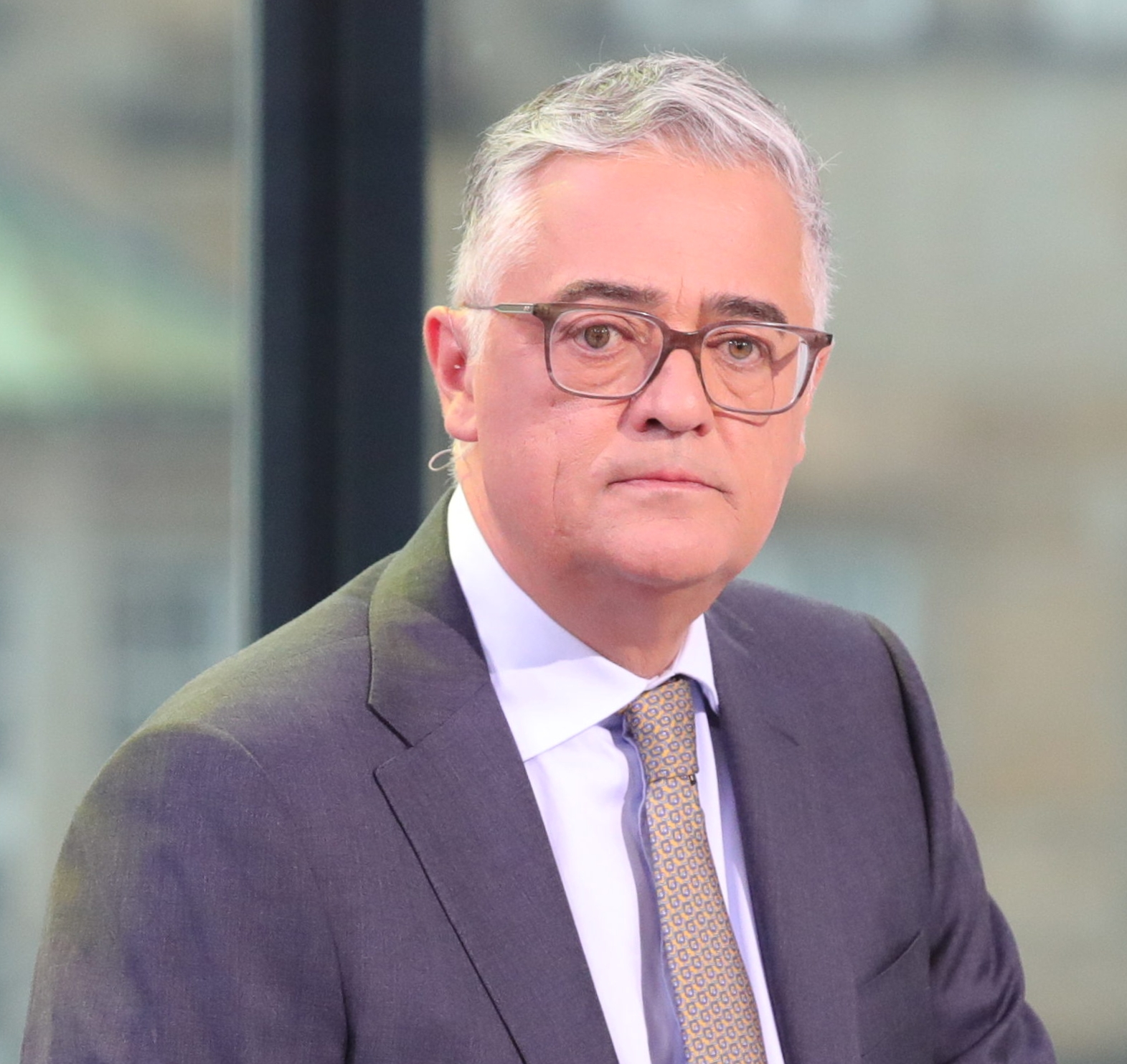
- Fornoff in 2023
- Born: 28 August 1963 (age 63); Mainz, West Germany
- Occupation: Television journalist

Matthias Fornoff (born 28 August 1963, in Mainz) is a German television journalist.

== Early life and career ==
Fornoff studied history, Slavic studies and politics at the University of Mainz, and received a master's degree from the Free University of Berlin.

Fornoff has worked for the German broadcaster ZDF since 1992. In 1997, he received a Telestar award for his reporting on the 1997 Central European flood. He later served as ZDF's Washington, D.C. correspondent from 2007 to 2010. Beginning in 2010, Fornoff served alongside Petra Gerster as a moderator of the German news show heute. In 2014, he became the head of ZDF's editorial department concerning politics and current affairs, also serving as a supervisor for election polling. Fornoff also currently serves as a presenter on the ZDF show Politbarometer.

== Personal life ==
Fornoff is married and has two children.

== Awards ==
- 1997: Telestar – for reporting on the 1997 Central European flood
