= Denis Scheck =

German literary critic

- Denis Scheck at the Frankfurt Book Fair 2026
- Born: 15 December 1964 (age 61); Stuttgart, West Germany
- Occupations: Journalist, literary critic, television presenter
- Known for: Presenting the television show Druckfrisch

Signature
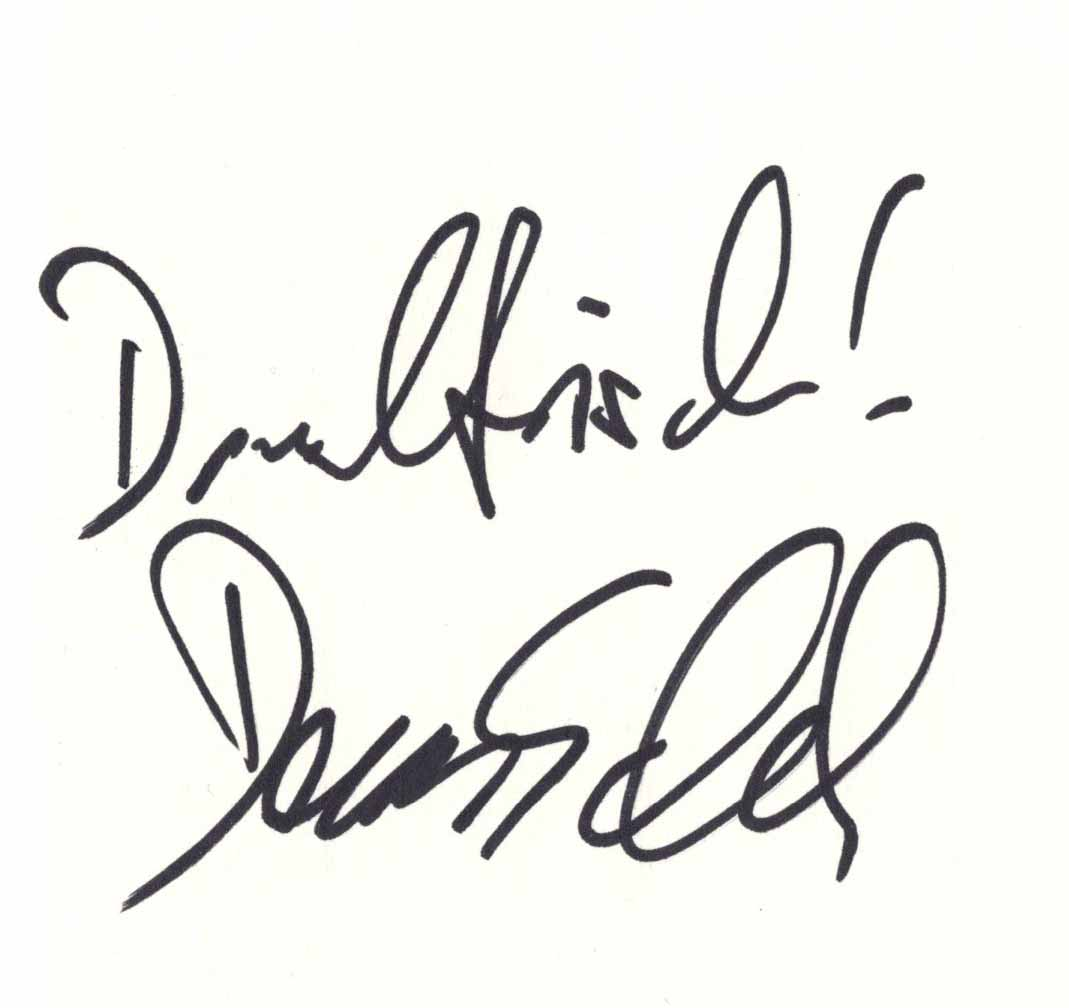

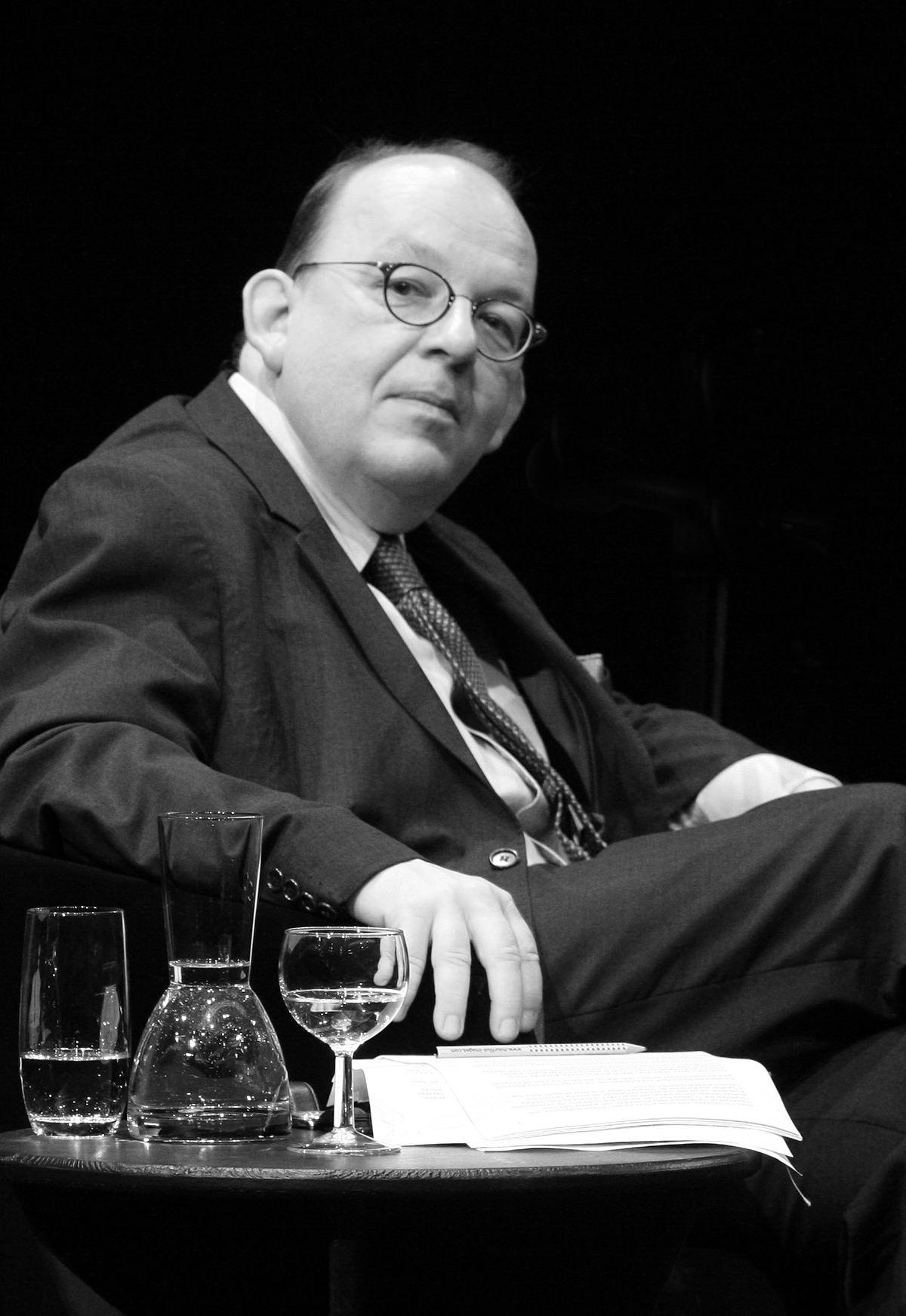
Scheck in 2010

Denis Scheck (born 15 December 1964) is a German literary critic, journalist, television presenter and former translator.

== Biography ==
Born in Stuttgart, he studied German studies, contemporary history and political science at the universities of Tübingen, Düsseldorf and Dallas, and earned a master's degree at the University of Texas at Dallas. He was a visiting professor at the University of Göttingen in 2004.

Scheck has been a literary agent, translator of American and British authors, publisher and independent critic. In 1997, he was appointed literary editor at Deutschlandfunk. He has presented the ARD programme Druckfrisch since February 2003.

Scheck lives with his wife in Cologne.

== Controversy ==
Scheck criticized the decision by German publisher Thienemann to change racist and racially insensitive terms in newer editions of children's books by Otfried Preußler and Astrid Lindgren. In response, and as an act of protest, in January 2013, he appeared on TV in blackface. Scheck, who describes himself as a critic of political correctness and censorship in the literary world, does, however, condemn the use of racist terms in contemporary and everyday language.

Scheck has been criticised several times for his harsh treatment of books, which he considers inferior. In the ‘Anti-Kanon’ section of his show Lesenswert, he presents what he considers to be the worst works in the history of literature. At the end of the review, the book is destroyed by an animated explosion. Critics drew comparisons with the burning of books, whereupon the animation was changed. His handling of books was also criticised by the German literary critic Elke Heidenreich, with whom he had already clashed several times, including through mutual insults.

== Publications ==
- 1993: King Kong, Spock & Drella – ein Lexikon amerikanischer Trivialmythen
- 1994: Hell's Kitchen – Streifzüge durch die zeitgenössische US-Literatur
- 2011: Sie & Er, der kleine Unterschied beim Essen und Trinken
- 2014: Kurt Vonnegut
- 2019: Schecks Kanon: Die 100 wichtigsten Werke der Weltliteratur
- 2022: Hungrig auf Berlin
- 2022: Schecks kulinarischer Kompass
- 2023: Der undogmatische Hund
- 2024: Schecks Bestsellerbibel: Schätze und Schund aus 20 Jahren

== Television ==
- Druckfrisch (since 2003)
- Lesenswert Quartett (2014–2025)
- Lesenswert (2016–2025)
- Kunscht! (2016–2018)

== Honours ==
- Kritikerpreis des Deutschen Anglistentages, 2000
- Übersetzerbarke des Deutschen Literaturübersetzerverbandes, 2007
- Hanns-Joachim-Friedrichs-Award, 2012
- Bavarian TV Awards, 2013
- Hildegard von Bingen Prize for Journalism, 2014
- Julius-Campe-Preis, 2015
