= Fritz J. Raddatz =

German writer and journalist (1931–2015)

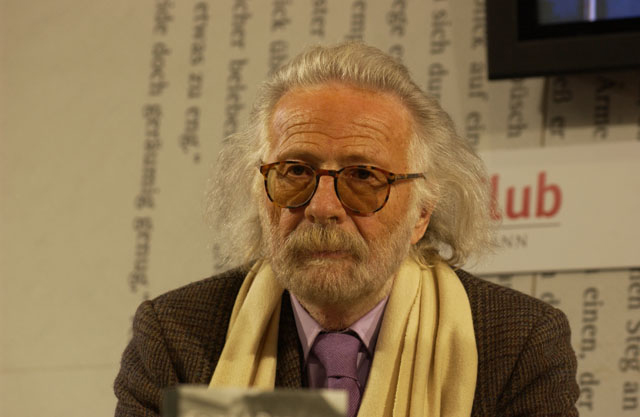
Fritz J. Raddatz (2003)

Fritz Joachim Raddatz (3 September 1931 – 26 February 2015) was a German feuilletonist, essayist, biographer, journalist and romancier.

== Life ==
Fritz Raddatz was born in Berlin. His mother, according to Raddatz a "Parisienne from a rich family", died after giving birth to him. His father was, as Raddatz once put it, "a relatively known" man. Raddatz, who knew his name but had no relationship to his biological father, never identified him. His stepfather was a fighter pilot in World War I. Raddatz was battered by him and also forced to have sex with his stepmother.

After his stepfather had died in 1946 the Protestant pastor Hans-Joachim Mund (1914–1986) became his legal guardian. At age 15 Raddatz started an affair with Mund. In 1950 Raddatz moved to East Berlin. He started to study German studies, history, theatre studies, art and American studies. In 1953 he closed his studies with the Staatsexamen at Humboldt University of Berlin. In 1958 Raddatz received a doctorate and in 1971 he was habilitated at University of Hannover under Hans Mayer.

Aged 20 he started to write for Berliner Zeitung. From 1953 to 1958 he led the foreign department of the publishing house Volk und Welt in East Berlin. Because Raddatz had ongoing conflicts with East German authorities he moved back to West Germany in 1958.

In 1960 he became chief editor and deputy publishing manager of Rowohlt Verlag. He held these positions until 1969, when he had to step down due to the "balloon affair". From 1976 until 1985 he was leading the feuilleton of Die Zeit.

Raddatz was one of the most influential literary critics in the field of German literature. He also published his diaries as well as many essays, novels and biographies.

Raddatz lived openly as a bisexual. In Hamburg he lived for more than 30 years with his partner Gerd.

In September 2014 Raddatz announced his retirement from active writing.

Raddatz, who was an advocate of Euthanasia, died by assisted suicide at the age of 83 on 26 February 2015 in Zürich. He never wanted to become a nursing case. In full possession of his powers he decided: "That's it, it's enough."

He was chairman of the Kurt Tucholsky Foundation and a member of PEN-Zentrum Germany and the Freie Akademie der Künste Hamburg.

== Awards ==
François Mitterrand awarded him the Officier of the Ordre des Arts et des Lettres. In 2010 Raddatz was awarded the Hildegard von Bingen Prize for Journalism.

== Selected works ==
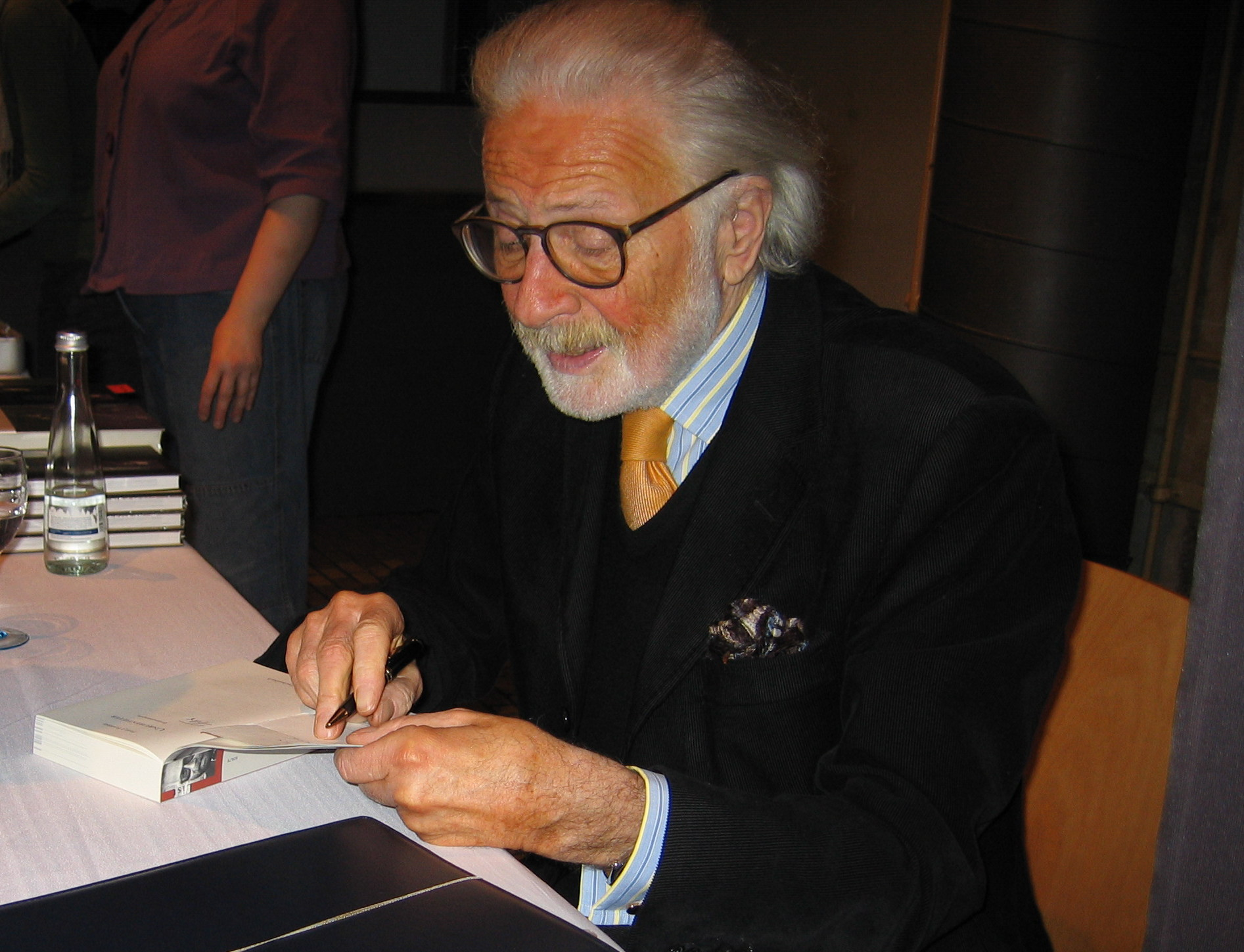
Fritz J. Raddatz (2012)

- Herders Konzeption der Literatur, dargelegt an seinen Frühschriften, 1958
- Traditionen und Tendenzen. Materialien zur Literatur der DDR. Suhrkamp, Frankfurt am Main 1972, ISBN 3-518-03995-4
- Georg Lukács in Selbstzeugnissen und Bilddokumenten. Rowohlt, Reinbek 1972, ISBN 3-499-50193-7
- Karl Marx. Eine politische Biographie. Hoffmann und Campe, Hamburg 1975, ISBN 3-455-06010-2
- Heinrich Heine. Ein deutsches Märchen. Essay. Hoffmann und Campe, Hamburg 1977, ISBN 3-455-06011-0
- Revolte und Melancholie. Essays zur Literaturtheorie. Knaus, Hamburg 1979, ISBN 3-8135-2543-0
- Von Geist und Geld. Heinrich Heine und sein Onkel, der Bankier Salomon. Eine Skizze. With six etchings by Günter Grass. Bund, Köln 1980, ISBN 3-7663-0631-6
- Eros und Tod. Literarische Portraits. Knaus, Hamburg 1980, ISBN 3-8135-2555-4
- Pyrenäenreise im Herbst. Auf den Spuren Kurt Tucholskys. Rowohlt, Reinbek 1985, ISBN 3-498-05705-7
- Die Nachgeborenen. Leseerfahrungen mit zeitgenössischer Literatur. S. Fischer, Frankfurt am Main 1983, ISBN 3-10-062802-0
- Lügner von Beruf. Auf den Spuren William Faulkners. Rowohlt, Reinbek 1987, ISBN 3-498-05711-1
- Tucholsky, ein Pseudonym. Essay. Rowohlt, Reinbek 1989, ISBN 3-498-05706-5
- Taubenherz und Geierschnabel. Heinrich Heine. Eine Biographie. Beltz, Weinheim 1997, ISBN 3-88679-288-9
- Ich habe dich anders gedacht. Erzählung. Arche, Zürich 2001, ISBN 3-7160-2287-X
- Gottfried Benn. Leben – niederer Wahn. Eine Biographie. Propyläen, Berlin 2001, ISBN 3-549-07145-0
- Günter Grass. Unerbittliche Freunde. Ein Kritiker. Ein Autor. Arche, Zürich 2002, ISBN 3-7160-2308-6
- Literarische Grenzgänger. Sieben Essays. List, München 2002, ISBN 3-548-60220-7
- Unruhestifter. Erinnerungen. Propyläen, Berlin 2003, ISBN 3-549-07198-1
- Eine Erziehung in Deutschland. Trilogie. Rowohlt, Reinbek 2006, ISBN 3-498-05778-2
- Liebes Fritzchen, Lieber Groß-Uwe. Der Briefwechsel (with Uwe Johnson). Suhrkamp, Frankfurt am Main 2006, ISBN 3-518-41839-4
- Schreiben heißt, sein Herz waschen. Literarische Essays. Zu Klampen, Springe 2006, ISBN 3-934920-95-0
- Mein Sylt. Photos by Karin Székessy. Mare, Hamburg 2006, ISBN 3-936384-26-6
- Das Rot der Freiheitssonne wurde Blut. Literarische Essays. Zu Klampen, Springe 2007, ISBN 978-3-86674-013-6
- Rainer Maria Rilke. Überzähliges Dasein. Eine Biographie. Arche, Zürich 2009, ISBN 978-3-7160-2606-9
- Nizza – mon amour. Arche, Zürich 2010, ISBN 978-3-7160-2636-6
- Tagebücher 1982–2001. Rowohlt, Reinbek 2010, ISBN 978-3-498-05781-7
- Bestiarium der deutschen Literatur. Rowohlt, Reinbek 2012, ISBN 978-3-498-05793-0
- Tagebücher 2002–2012. Rowohlt, Reinbek 2014, ISBN 978-3498057978.
- Jahre mit Ledig: Eine Erinnerung. Rowohlt, Reinbek 2015, ISBN 978-3-498-05798-5
