= Thomas Oppermann (academic) =

German academic (1931–2019)

Thomas Oppermann (15 February 1931 in Heidelberg – 26 January 2019) was a German legal academic and university administrator.

Oppermann received his Doctor of Laws from the University of Freiburg in 1959 and became a professor in Public, European, International Law and Foreign Politics at the University of Tübingen in 1967. He served as dean of the Tubingen Faculty of Law between 1971 and 1972, and became the university vice president in 1983.

Between 1985 and 2003, Oppermann served as a judge on the Baden-Württemberg State Court of Justice, the state's constitutional court. He has also served on several legal associations, including as chair of the Association of German Constitutional Lawyers. For his legal scholarship, Oppermann received the Order of Merit of the Federal Republic of Germany in 2004.

Oppermann is married to Ingrid Oppermann (née Cording), and has four children.

== Selected publications ==
- Focus: Administrative, Constitutional, Educational and Media Law – EU Law, European Politics and International Law (e.g. WTO-Law)
- Die algerische Frage, 1959 (French 1961)
- Britisches Unterhauswahlrecht und Zweiparteiensystem, 1961
- Kulturverwaltungsrecht, 1969
- Das parlamentarische Regierungssystem des Grundgesetzes, Veröffentlichungen der Vereinigung der Deutschen Staatsrechtslehrer 33 (1975), 624
- Auf dem Wege zur gemischten Rundfunkverfassung der Bundesrepublik Deutschland, Juristenzeitung 1981, 721
- A new GATT for the Nineties and Europe '92, 1992 (Ed. with Josef Molsberger)
- Die Europäische Union von Lissabon, Deutsches Verwaltungsblatt 2008, 473
- Deutschland in guter Verfassung ? - 60 Jahre Grundgesetz, Juristenzeitung 2009, 481
- Europarecht (Text-book) 5 editions (1991, 1999, 2005, 2009, 2011) – Since 2009 together with Claus-Dieter Classen and Martin Nettesheim
