= Heute-journal =

German television news program

heute-journal
- Presented by: Marietta Slomka; Christian Sievers; Bettina Schausten
- Country of origin: Germany
- Original language: German

Production
- Producer: ZDF
- Production location: Mainz
- Running time: Weekdays: 30 minutes Weekends: 15 minutes

Original release
- Network: ZDF
- Release: 2 January 1978 – present

Related
- heute

heute-journal (roughly Today's Journal) is a German television news program broadcast on ZDF.

== History ==
The programme premiered on 2 January 1978 as a late weekday evening 20 minute program. Originally, it was broadcast at 9 p.m. Monday through Thursday and at 10 p.m. on Fridays. It has been broadcast at 9:45 p.m. since 1 January 1984. In 1991, the running time of the programme was extended to 30 minutes. 15-minute editions were added on Saturdays (in 1992) and Sundays (in 2000). The running time of the programme is sometimes extended to one hour, to cover special events or particularly important stories. During football matches, a short edition of heute-journal is generally broadcast during the half-time break, eliminating the second news summary, stock market report and the final report (usually related to science or culture).

The programme usually starts at 9:45pm and runs for 27 minutes, followed by a 3-minute weather forecast. On Fridays it starts at 10:00pm, after the Friday crime drama; on Saturdays it is usually broadcast from 10:45pm.

== Concept ==
In contrast to Heute, its early evening counterpart, heute-journal provides in-depth coverage of the news, usually with detailed background information and interviews with politicians, business leaders, experts, and other key people. There is also a daily report from the Frankfurt Stock Exchange and a weather forecast. Wolf von Lojewski, a former presenter and managing editor of the programme, once said that while heute will report that a particular politician has resigned, heute-journal will also provide detailed analysis on the reasons for the resignation.

Each edition of heute-journal has two presenters: the main presenter, who introduces most reports and conducts interviews, and the co-presenter, who is part of the editorial team and presents news summaries during the programme. The presenters generally alternate weekly.

The programme is comparable to Tagesthemen broadcast on Das Erste. The programmes' audience is sometimes higher than that of heute.

== Opening sequence ==
Initially, the program programme's opening sequence showed the anchors, with a clock overlay and a ticker with headlines of the day. The ticker sound effect was Morse code for "heute".

The programme moved to a new, virtual studio in 2009, and a new opening sequence was added at the same time. The camera panned towards the anchors while the day's headlines, along with the time, were seen in the background; there was no real title sequence.

As of 19 February 2011, a darker background is used than for other heute news programmes. Instead of a 2D world map in the background, five globes are shown. At the start of the sequence, the clock and headlines appear in the foreground, followed by a title sequence, and finally either a zoom to the presenters or a cut to footage of the main story.

As of 25 June 2007, the program is broadcast in 16:9. It is available as a video or audio podcast.

== Presenters ==
=== Current presenters ===
Presenter	Start date	Role
Marietta Slomka	29 January 2001	Main presenter
Christian Sievers	15 January 2013	Main presenter (Relief presenter before 2022)
Anne Gellinek	18 August 2022	Relief presenter
Dunja Hayali	20 February 2023	Relief presenter

=== Former presenters ===
Presenter	Years
Klaus Bresser	1978–1983
Dieter Kronzucker	1978–1980; 1986–1988
Karlheinz Rudolph	1978–1983
Jochen Schweizer	1978–1982
Gustav Trampe	1978–1979
Ingeborg Wurster	1979–1984
Ruprecht Eser	1985–1992
Sigmund Gottlieb	1988–1991
Alexander Niemetz	1991–2000
Wolf von Lojewski	1992–2003
Eberhard Piltz	1993–1997
Helmut Reitze	1997–2002
Klaus-Peter Siegloch	2003–2007
Claus Kleber	2003–2021
Steffen Seibert	2007–2010
Maybrit Illner	2010–2012
Bettina Schausten	2020–2022

== Co-presenters ==
Since 30 June 1986, there has been a co-presenter, or an "editor in the studio", who presents a news summary during the programme.

Co-presenter	Start date	Comments
Gundula Gause	8 February 1993	usually with Anne Gellinek or Dunja Hayali
Heinz Wolf	11 January 1999	usually with Marietta Slomka
Hanna Zimmermann	10 January 2022	usually with Christian Sievers

=== Former co-presenters ===
Co-presenter	Year started	Year left
Nina Ruge	1989	1994
Bernhard Nellessen	1992	1994
Anja Charlet	1995	2001
Alexander Stock	1995	1997
Michaela Kolster	2000	2000
Caroline Hamann	2001	2002
Barbara Hahlweg	2003	2007
Carsten Rüger	2015	2015

== Controversies ==
In February 2026, heute-journal controversially broadcast artificial intelligence-generated videos of ICE deportations in the United States without specifying the videos' origin. ZDF later removed the segment and stated that the images should have been labeled as AI-generated.
