= Claus Kleber =

German journalist (born 1955)

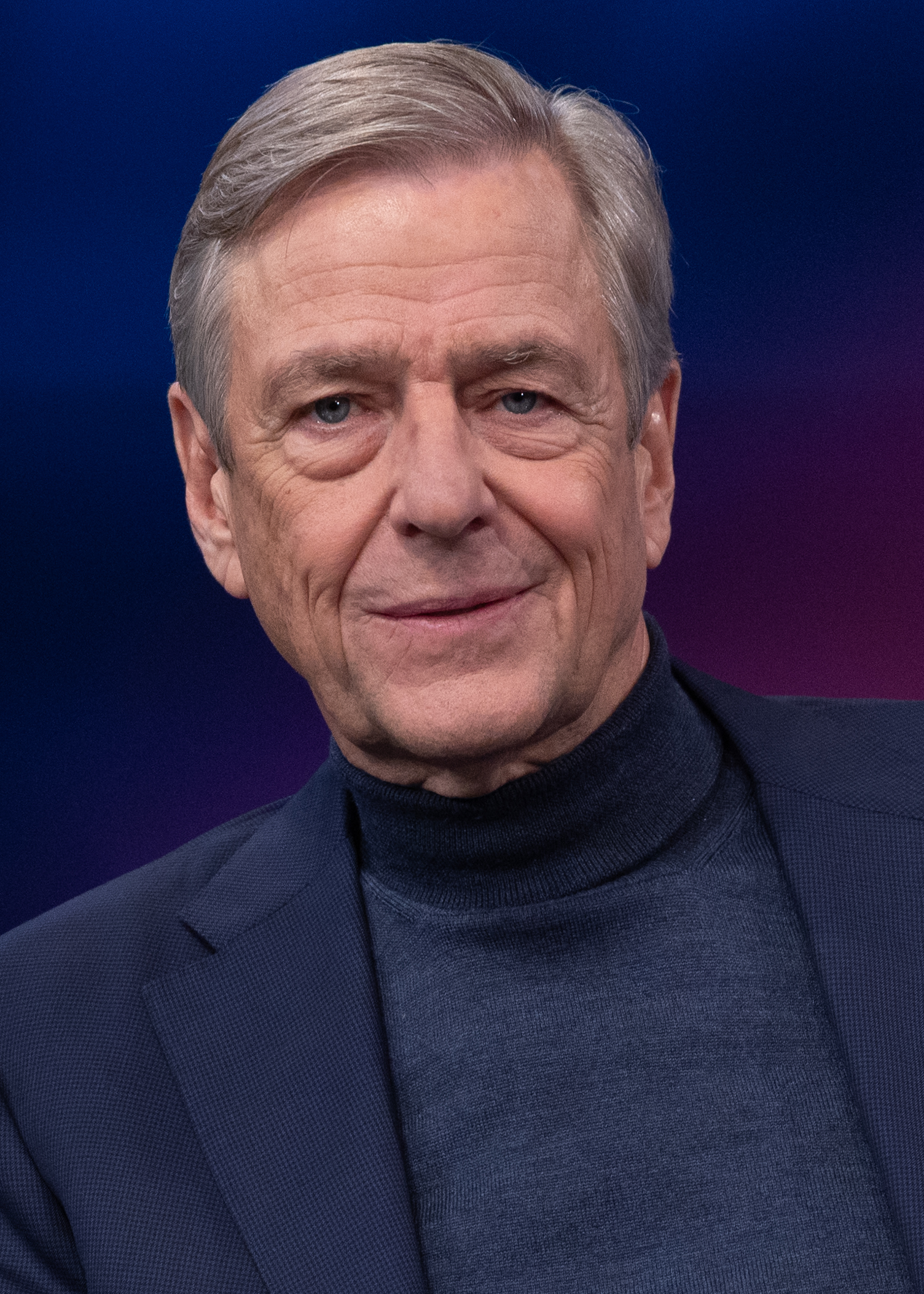
- Kleber in November 2025
- Born: Claus-Detlev Walter Kleber; 2 September 1955 (age 71); Reutlingen, Baden-Württemberg, then part of West Germany
- Occupations: Journalist, news presenter
- Years active: 1986–2021, 2022–present
- Employer: ZDF
- Notable credit: heute-journal (2003–2021)
- Spouse: Renate Kleber (after 1982)
- Children: 2
- Awards: See Awards

Claus-Detlev Walter Kleber (born 2 September 1955) is a German journalist and former lawyer. He was the anchor of the Heute-journal, an evening news program on the German public television station ZDF. Kleber has reported on international politics, including U.S. affairs and German-American relations, themes covered in his published book Amerikas Kreuzzüge ("America's Crusades") in 2005.

== Early life ==
Claus Kleber was born in Reutlingen, Germany. He attended the Otto-Hahn-Gymnasium in Bergisch Gladbach and completed his Abitur in 1974. During his school years, he worked as a freelance reporter for the local newspaper Kölner Stadt-Anzeiger. In 1974, Kleber began studying law at the University of Tübingen and spent two semesters abroad at the University of Lausanne in Switzerland (1978-1979). Kleber passed his first Staatsexamen in law in autumn of 1980 and completed his legal training in Stuttgart. In 1983, he passed his second Staatsexamen, after which he conducted doctoral research in New York City and Washington, D.C., supported by scholarships from the Studienstiftung and the German Academic Exchange Service DAAD. He worked as a lawyer in Stuttgart, specializing in commercial law and competition law. In 1986, he completed his PhD in law under Thomas Oppermann at the University of Tübingen.

== Career ==
=== Radio and television ===
While completing his law degree and doctorate, Kleber worked as a freelance radio reporter and news anchor. After earning his doctorate, he entered journalism full time, first in public broadcasting and later as a foreign correspondent. During the 1980s, he served as the Washington correspondent for the German public broadcaster Deutschlandfunk (DLF), covering U.S. politics and international affairs. In 1989, he returned to Germany to become chief editor of RIAS, a Berlin-based broadcaster then operated by the United States Information Agency.

From 1990 to 2002, Kleber worked for ARD as a senior correspondent and bureau chief. During this period, he conducted interviews with U.S. presidents, as well as with Donald Rumsfeld and Colin Powell. In June 2002, he was appointed ARD bureau chief in London.

A few months later, he became managing editor and principal anchor of Heute-journal, a 30-minute late-evening news programme produced and televised by ZDF, a nationwide public television channel in Germany. In 2014, he interviewed U.S. President Barack Obama. In June 2021, he announced his departure from ZDF at the end of the year.

=== Documentaries ===
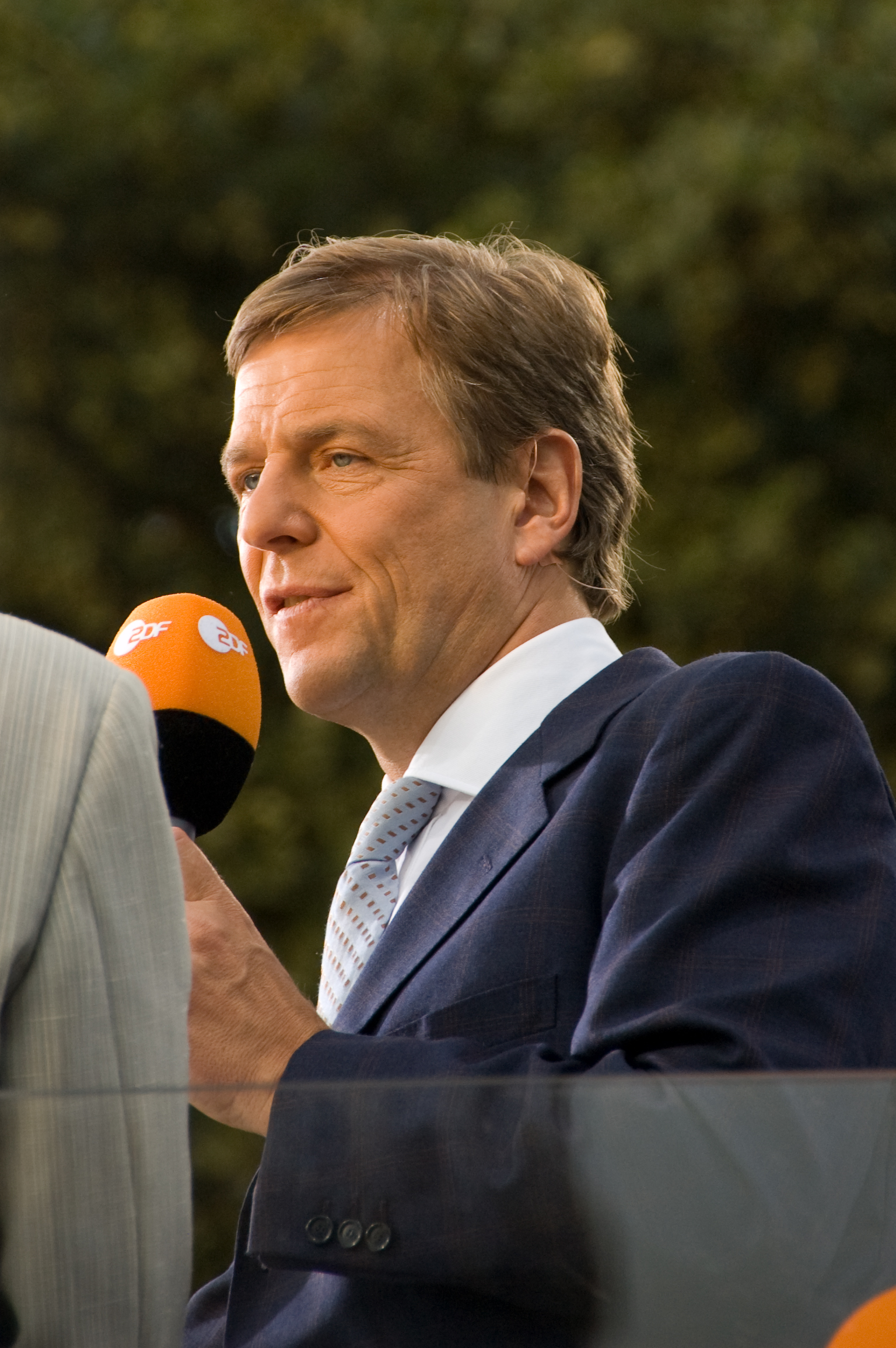
Claus Kleber in July 2008, attending Barack Obama's speech at the Victory Column in Berlin

Kleber has produced documentary films in partnership with Angela Andersen, including India – Unstoppable which was released for the DVD market in 2006.

They later also made documentaries for broadcasting, such as The Bomb (2009), about nuclear threats in the 21st century; Machtfaktor Erde (2011) on climate change; and HUNGER! and DURST! (Thirst), a two-part documentary (2014) that explored the global challenge and efforts to feed 10 billion people by 2050.

In 2017, their 90-minute report on human rights, Unantastbar (Inviolable), won the Silver Award at the New York Film Festival and was nominated for Best Documentary at the Monaco International Film Festival.

In 2021, ZDF aired "We have the better story," a 40-minute conversation between Kleber and U.S. President Barack Obama discussing his achievements and shortcomings.

=== Books ===
Kleber's book Amerikas Kreuzzüge ('America's Crusades') won the 2005 Corine Literature Prize for Best Non-Fiction. Shortly before the 2008 presidential election, Kleber published an updated edition reflecting more recent developments and candidates. In 2012, Kleber published Spielball Erde about the global strategic consequences of Climate Change.

=== Further information ===
Since 2015, Kleber has been an Honorary Professor at his alma mater, the University of Tübingen. He is a member of Atlantik-Brücke, an organization promoting cultural, economic, and military cooperation between Germany and the United States.

== Recognition ==
Kleber is the recipient of several awards, including the Media prize of the Johanna Quandt Foundation (1998) for economic reporting, the RIAS TV prize (1997, 1999 and 2003), and the Deutscher Fernsehpreis (the German equivalent of the American Emmy Awards) in 2005, 2006 and 2013 (Heute-journal as best German news program). Claus Kleber and his ZDF partner anchor Marietta Slomka, were awarded the Grimme-Preis (Grimme Prize) in 2009 for their merits in the evolution of television. In 2010, he won the Hanns Joachim Friedrichs Award for Outstanding Journalism. His documentary work on global challenges (with Angela Andersen) received the Deutscher Fernsehpreis for The Bomb in 2009 and the Bayerischer Fernsehpreis for HUNGER! DURST! in 2015. In a 2018 survey conducted by Forsa Institute, he was voted Germany's most trusted news presenter.

== Awards ==
- 1998: Preis der RIAS Berlin Kommission für die Fernsehproduktion Pioneer Square (ARD-Studio Washington zusammen mit Tom Buhrow, Sabine Reifenberg)
- 1999: Fernsehpreis der RIAS Berlin Kommission für die Produktion Oh Gott, Amerika! Glaube, Seelen, Scharlatane (ARD-Studio Washington zusammen mit Tom Buhrow, Georg Kellermann, Sabine Reifenberg)
- 1999: Herbert Quandt Medien-Preis der Johanna-Quandt-Stiftung
- 2004: Hildegard von Bingen Prize for Journalism
- 2004: Fernsehpreis der RIAS Berlin Kommission für die Produktion Allmacht Amerika. Die Welt im Griff (ZDF, zusammen mit der Filmemacherin Angela Andersen)
- 2005: Corine, internationaler Literaturpreis für das Buch Amerikas Kreuzzüge – Was die Weltmacht treibt
- 2006: Carl-Schurz-Plakette der State Legislative Leaders Foundation
- 2005: Deutscher Fernsehpreis für die beste Moderation einer Informationssendung
- 2006: Deutscher Fernsehpreis für die Moderation der „Besten Informationssendung“ (ZDF spezial: Krieg ohne Ende)
- 2006: Luchs des Monats (Juli) für das Jugendbuch Nachrichten, die Geschichte machten. Von der Antike bis heute
- 2008: Nominierung für den Bambi 2008 (Kategorie Moderation)
- 2008: Politikjournalist des Jahres 2008 von Medium Magazin
- 2009: Adolf-Grimme-Preis des Jahres 2009 – Besondere Ehrung des Deutschen Volkshochschul-Verbandes (gemeinsam mit Marietta Slomka)
- 2009: Deutscher Fernsehpreis für die beste Reportage (Die Bombe), gemeinsam mit Angela Andersen
- 2010: Hanns Joachim Friedrichs Preis für Fernsehjournalismus
- 2010: Krawattenmann des Jahres
- 2013: Goldene Kamera (Beste Information – Bester Anchorman)
- 2013: Karl-Carstens-Preis des Freundeskreis der Bundesakademie für Sicherheitspolitik e. V.
- 2015: Bayerischer Fernsehpreis zusammen mit Angela Andersen als Autoren der zweiteiligen Dokumentation Hunger! Durst! (ZDF)
- 2017: Schöne Neue Welt – Wie Silicon Valley unsere Zukunft bestimmt, Silver World Medal. New York Film Festival 2017, nominiert „Beste Dokumentation“ beim TV Festival Monte Carlo, Special Selection „Science Film Festival“

== Bibliography ==
- Kleber, Claus (2008) [2005]. Amerikas Kreuzzüge. Wohin treibt die Weltmacht? (in German) (eight and updated ed.). München: C. Bertelsmann Verlag. ISBN 978-3-570-55001-4.
- Kleber, Claus and Paskal, Cleo (2012). Spielball Erde. Machtkämpfe im Klimawandel. (in German) (original ed.). München: C. Bertelsmann Verlag. ISBN 978-3-570-10134-6.
