= Anne Gellinek =

German journalist and TV host

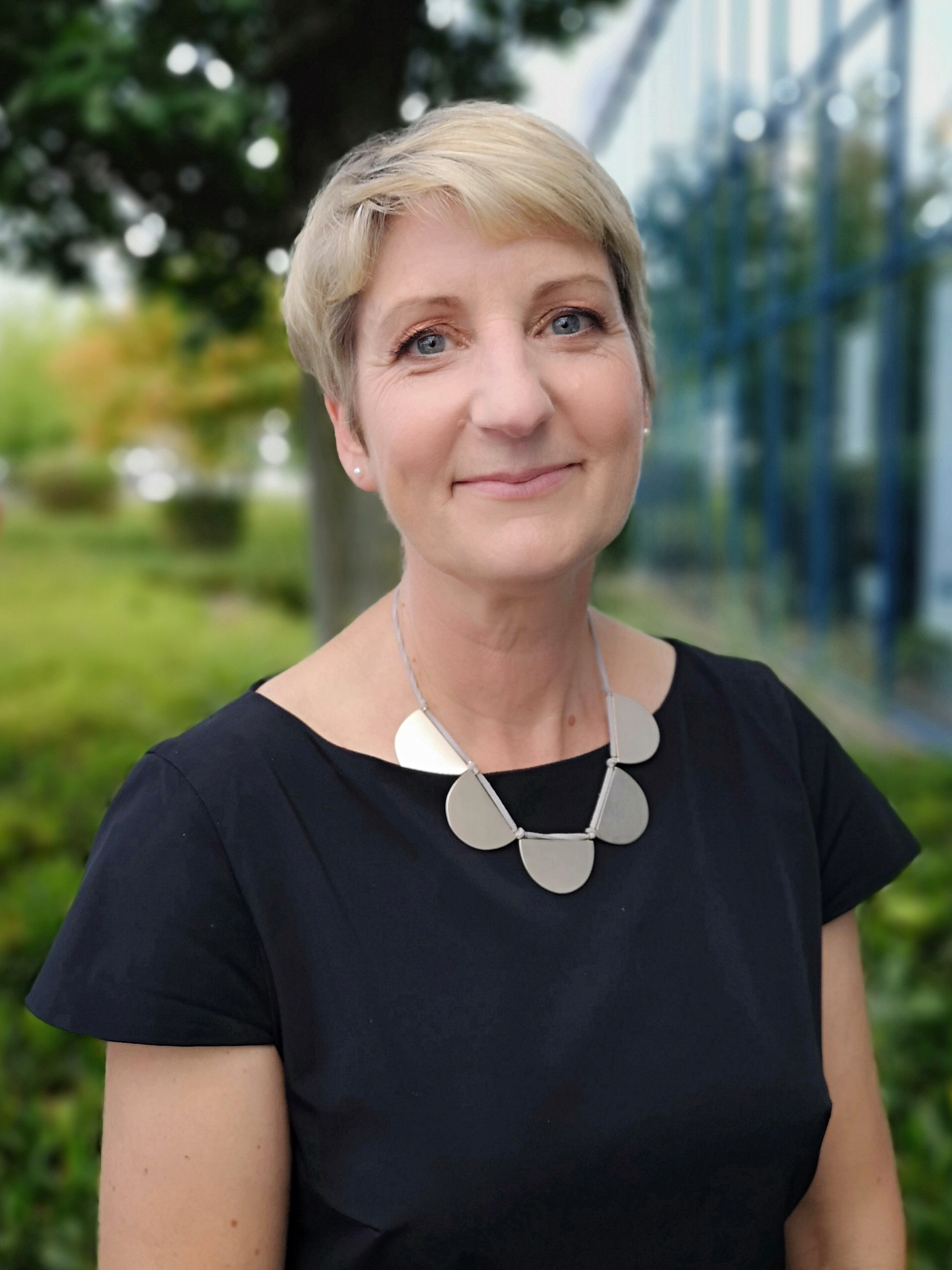
- Gellinek in 2018
- Born: 1962 (age 63–64); Mülheim an der Ruhr, Germany
- Occupations: Journalist; TV host
- Years active: 1991–today

Anne Gellinek (born 1962) is a German journalist and TV host who has been one of the anchors of heute-journal, a television news magazine broadcast on German public-service broadcaster ZDF, since 2022.

Gellinek previously worked as the Brussels Bureau Chief of ZDF and was ranked as number 6 among influential women in Brussels by European affairs weekly newspaper Politico in 2018.

== Early life and education ==
Gellinek was born in 1962 in Mülheim an der Ruhr, Germany.

Starting university in 1981, Gellinek studied Slavic Studies, Eastern European History and Journalism in Münster and Moscow.

== Career ==
While in Moscow, Gellinek worked as a freelance journalist for the Moscow offices of the Rheinische Post and Newsweek. From 1991 to 1992 she interned at ZDF in Mainz and from 1992 to 1995 she worked for ZDF in Düsseldorf. In 1994 Gellinek also received a three-month grant from the Arthur F. Burns Fellowships for Young Journalists in Seattle, US. Since the, Gellinek has continued to work for German broadcaster ZDF, as a journalist and TV-host, in Berlin and Moscow.

In August 2014, Gellinek started as a correspondent at the ZDF studio Brussels and in 2015 she was promoted to Brussels bureau chief of ZDF. In 2018 Politico, named Gellinek as one of the most influential women shaping Brussels politics.

She shapes how millions of Germans see Brussels everyday as chief of the ZDF television network’s office in the EU capital. With so much of EU policy hanging on German public opinion, from Greek bailouts to an open door for refugees, Gellinek holds one of the most prized journalism roles in the city.

— https://www.politico.eu/list/the-women-who-shape-brussels/anne-gellinek/
