= Timotheus Höttges =

German businessman

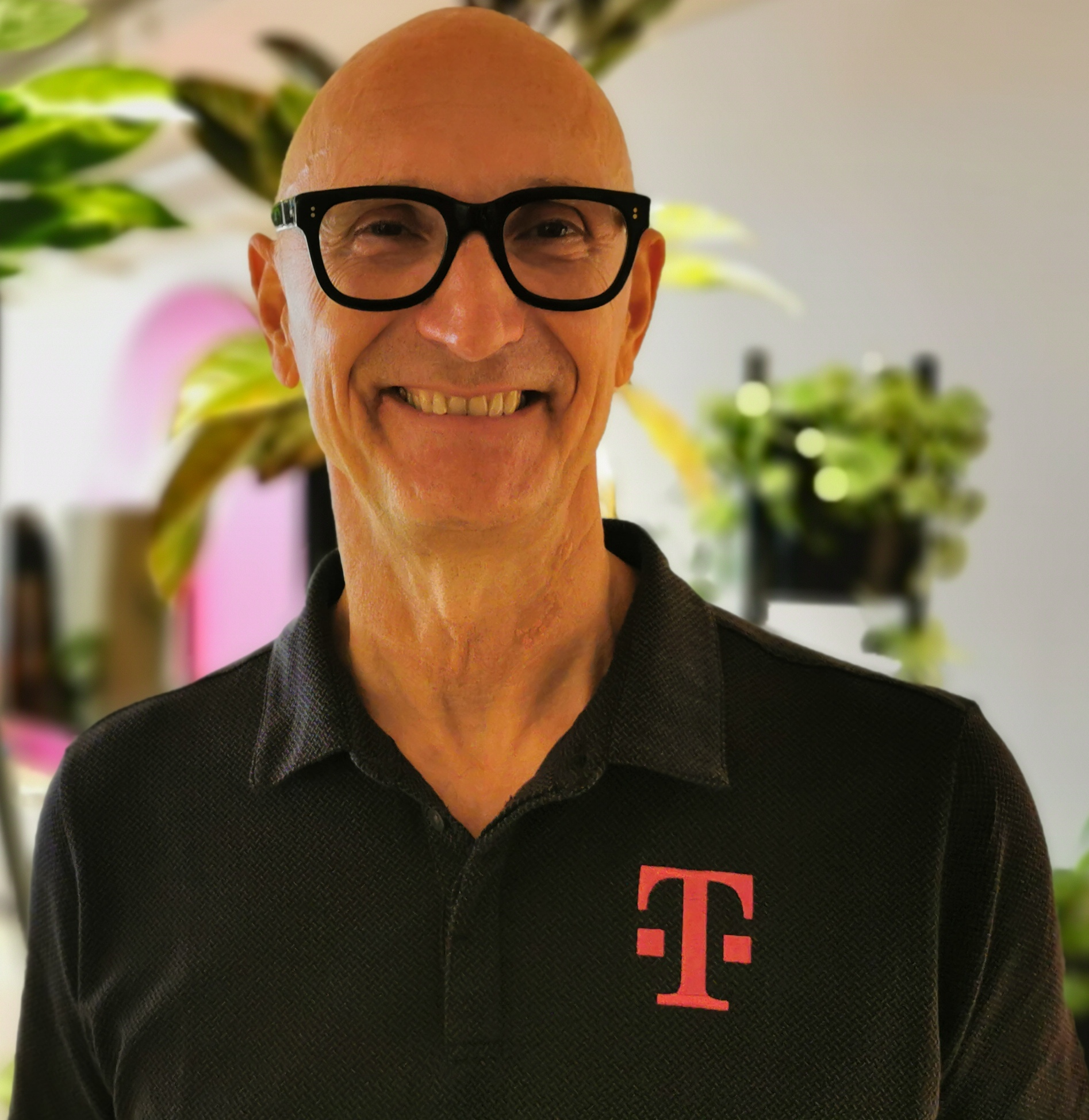
- Höttges in 2025
- Born: 18 September 1962 (age 64); Solingen, Germany
- Occupation: Businessman
- Employer: Deutsche Telekom

Timotheus Höttges (born 18 September 1962) is a German business executive who has been chief executive officer of Deutsche Telekom AG, the majority shareholder of T-Mobile US, since 2014.

== Early life and education ==
He was born in Solingen in North Rhine-Westphalia (Nordrhein-Westfalen). His father was an engineer. He went to the August-Dicke-Schule in Solingen, one of four gymnasium schools in Solingen. He then did his Zivildienst – compulsory community work.

Höttges received a degree in Business (Betriebswirtschaftslehre) from the University of Cologne (Universität zu Köln).

== Career ==
=== VIAG AG ===
In 1992, Höttges began working for VIAG in Munich. VIAG merged with VEBA (Düsseldorf) in 2000 to form Düsseldorf-headquartered E.ON.

=== Deutsche Telekom AG ===
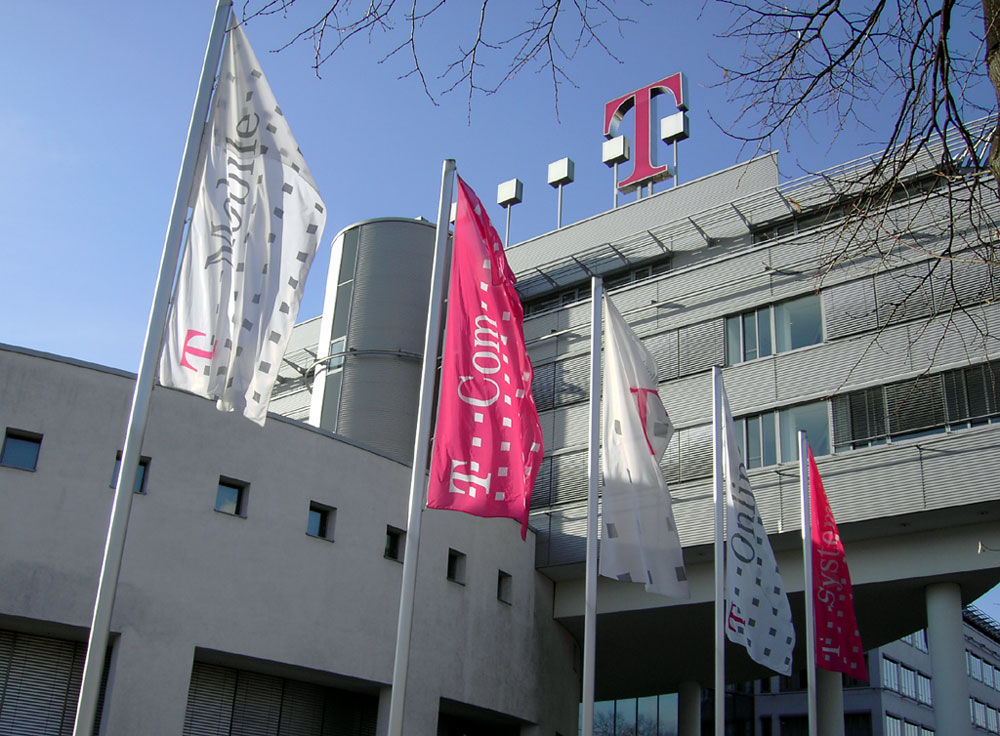
Bonn headquarters of Deutsche Telekom

Höttges joined Deutsche Telekom in 2000. From 2006-09 he worked on the T-Home brand, and helped develop the Telekom Entertain (former T-Home Entertain) internet TV service. He joined the company's board of directors on 5 December 2006. On 1 March 2009 he became Finance Director of Deutsche Telekom.

Höttges then became CEO of Deutsche Telekom on 1 January 2014, succeeding René Obermann. Following BT Group's takeover of EE, formerly a joint venture of Deutsche Telekom and Orange, Höttges became a member of BT Group's board of directors.

== Other activities ==
=== Corporate boards ===
- T-Mobile US, Chairman Board of Directors
- Daimler, Member of the Supervisory Board (since 2020)
- BT Group, Non-Executive Member of the Board of Directors (2016–2021)
- Henkel, Member of the Supervisory Board (2016–2021)
- FC Bayern Munich, Member of the Supervisory Board (2010–2021)
- EE, Non-Executive Member of the Board of Directors (-2014)
- OTE, Non-Executive Member of the Board of Directors (2011-2013)

=== Non-profit organizations ===
- Deutsche Telekom Stiftung, Chairman of the Board of Trustees
- European Round Table of Industrialists (ERT), Member
- European School of Management and Technology (ESMT), Member of the Board of Trustees
- Federation of German Industries (BDI), Member of the Presidium (2017-2019)
- Deutsche Sporthilfe, Member of the Foundation’s Council (since 2015)

== Personal life ==
Höttges lives with his wife and two sons in the Bad Godesberg district of Bonn.

Business positions
Preceded by René Obermann	Chief Executive of Deutsche Telekom; January 2014 -	Succeeded by Incumbent
Preceded by	Finance Director of Deutsche Telekom; March 2009 - December 2013	Succeeded by Thomas Dannenfeldt
Preceded by	Managing Director of Telekom Deutschland; April 2002 - January 2005	Succeeded by
Preceded by	Finance Director of Telekom Deutschland; September 2000 - April 2002	Succeeded by
