= Marietta Slomka =

German journalist (born 1969)

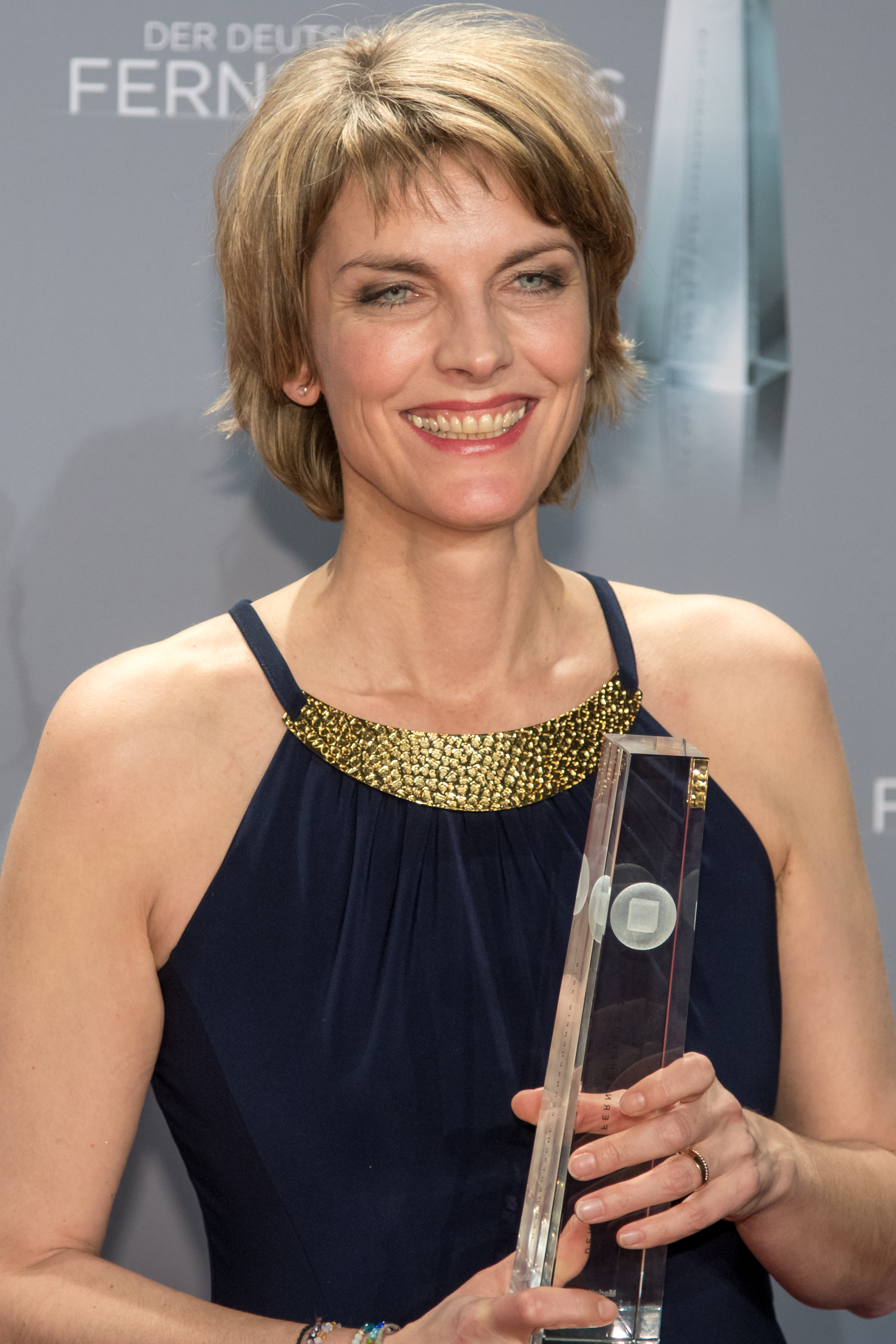
- Slomka in 2018
- Born: 20 April 1969 (age 57); Cologne, North Rhine-Westphalia, West Germany
- Occupations: Journalist; News presenter
- Years active: 1996–present
- Employer: ZDF
- Notable credit: heute-journal (2001–present)

Marietta Slomka (born 20 April 1969 in Cologne) is a German journalist who has been the anchor of TV news show heute-journal since 2001.

== Education ==
The daughter of a teacher, Slomka studied international politics and economics at the universities of Cologne and Kent. In 1988, she completed an internship at Roussel Uclaf in Paris.

Slomka lives in Cologne and Mainz.

== Career ==
After university, Slomka worked from 1991 to 1996 for Cologne Institute for Economic Research (IW). In parallel, she started her career in journalism at local newspaper Kölnische Rundschau in 1994.

As television journalist, Slomka has been working on German broadcaster ZDF since 1998. Between 1998 and 2000, she worked as news correspondent in Bonn and Berlin. In 2000, she took over as presenter of heute nacht, a late-night news show. Since 2001, she has been the anchor of news magazine heute-journal on ZDF, currently in rotation with Claus Kleber (since 2003) and Christian Sievers (since 2013). Her co-anchor is Heinz Wolf. As anchor, she has interviewed national and international political leaders, including Hillary Clinton (2009), Jean-Claude Juncker (2012) and Angela Merkel (2021). In May 2017, she reported live from Paris during the French presidential elections.

In addition to her role as presenter, Slomka has produced several documentaries, including Afrikas Schätze (2010) and Zwischen Anden und Amazonien – mit Marietta Slomka durch Südamerika (2014).

== Recognition ==
In a 2018 survey conducted by Forsa Institute, Slomka was voted Germany's most trusted female news presenter. In addition, she has been awarded numerous prizes, including the following:

- 2009: Adolf Grimme Award
- 2012: Medienpreis für Sprachkultur, Association for the German Language (GfdS)
- 2015: Hanns Joachim Friedrichs Award
- 2017: Goldene Kamera for "Best Information"
- 2018: German Television Award
- 2020: German Television Award

== Books ==
- Slomka, Marietta (2009). Kanzler lieben Gummistiefel so funktioniert Politik (in German). München. ISBN 978-3-570-13555-6. OCLC 31728600.
- Slomka, Marietta (2011). Mein afrikanisches Tagebuch Reise durch einen Kontinent im Aufbruch (in German). München. ISBN 978-3-570-10076-9. OCLC 702643444.
