= Maybrit Illner =

German journalist and television presenter (born 1965)

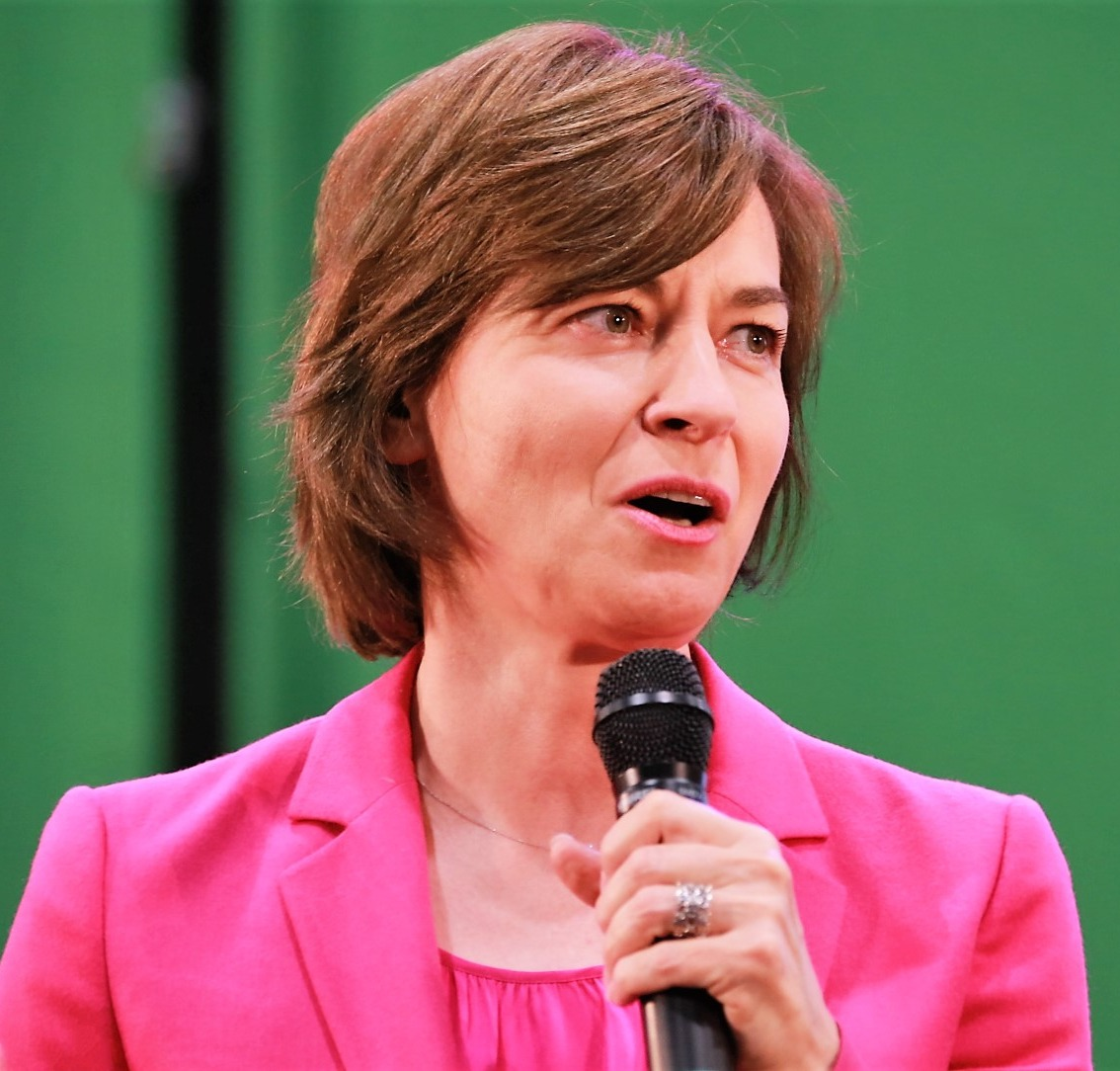
- Illner in 2016
- Born: Maybrit Klose; 12 January 1965 (age 61); East Berlin, East Germany
- Education: University of Leipzig (1984–1988)
- Occupations: Journalist, television presenter, author
- Years active: 1980s–present
- Spouses: Michael Illner (m. 1988–2007) René Obermann (m. 2010–2025)
- Awards: See Awards

Maybrit Illner (née Klose; born 12 January 1965) is a German journalist, television presenter, and author. She is best known as the long-time host of the ZDF political talk show maybrit illner.

== Early life and education ==
Born Maybrit Klose in East Berlin, she is the daughter of a teacher (mother) and a scientist/energy economist (father). She grew up in the Friedrichshain district and attended the Erweiterte Oberschule "Friedrich Engels" (today Andreas-Gymnasium), completing her Abitur in 1983.

From 1983 to 1984 she completed a traineeship in the sports department of Deutscher Fernsehfunk (DFF), the state broadcaster of the German Democratic Republic. She studied journalism at the Karl-Marx-Universität Leipzig from 1984 to 1988, graduating with a diploma.

== SED membership ==
While studying in Leipzig, Illner joined the ruling Socialist Unity Party of Germany (SED) in 1986 at the age of 21.

She later explained her decision as motivated by reformist hopes inspired by Mikhail Gorbachev's policies of perestroika and glasnost:

Yes, at the age of 21 I joined the SED – with the idea that what had happened a year earlier under Gorbachev in the CPSU would now also happen with the SED. I wanted to be part of it when socialism finally implemented the lofty ideals it had always proclaimed, thanks to a completely reformed party. And there were one or two signs that nourished this hope. But it soon turned out that the hope was an illusion.

She left the SED in 1989 following the Wende and the fall of the Berlin Wall (some sources cite 1991). Her party membership and early work in GDR state media have occasionally been discussed publicly, though no high-ranking functions or Stasi involvement have been documented. Illner has addressed her past openly in the context of youthful idealism within the GDR system.

== Career ==
=== GDR period ===
After her studies, Illner worked as a sports journalist for Deutscher Fernsehfunk. She contributed to the main news programme Aktuelle Kamera and later moved to the foreign affairs/editorial department. She moderated programmes including azur – das Reisejournal until the broadcaster was dissolved in 1991.

=== ZDF ===
Illner joined the ZDF in 1992 as co-presenter of the weekday morning programme ZDF-Morgenmagazin, becoming its head presenter in 1998.

In October 1999 she launched the political talk show Berlin Mitte, renamed maybrit illner in March 2007. The programme airs on Thursday evenings and features debates with politicians and experts.

She has moderated or co-moderated several federal election television debates (2002, 2005, 2013, 2017, and 2021). Notable interviews include Vladimir Putin (2006), Angela Merkel, and Olaf Scholz (2022 and 2023). From 2010 to 2012 she co-anchored the heute-journal evening news.

== Personal life ==
Her first name is an unusual German spelling of the Swedish Maj-Britt. She was married to television journalist Michael Illner from 1988 until their divorce in 2007.

On 14 August 2010 she married René Obermann, then CEO of Deutsche Telekom, at Schloss Ulrichshusen. In November 2025 the couple announced their separation after 15 years of marriage.

Illner has worked with the German Red Cross, travelling to Iraq (2003) and Pakistan (2004). In 2018 she chaired the jury of the Ludwig-Börne-Preis.

== Publications ==
- (Editor) Frauen an der Macht. 21 einflussreiche Frauen berichten aus der Wirklichkeit. Hugendubel, 2005, ISBN 3-7205-2649-6.
- Politiker-Deutsch/Deutsch-Politiker. Langenscheidt, 2007, ISBN 978-3-468-73190-7.
- (with Ingke Brodersen) Ente auf Sendung. Von Medien und ihren Machern. Deutsche Verlags-Anstalt, 2003, ISBN 3-421-05751-6.

== Awards ==
- 2000: Hanns-Joachim-Friedrichs-Preis
- 2001: Hans-Klein-Medienpreis
- 2002 and 2007: Bambi
- 2003: Bayerischer Fernsehpreis
- 2004: Deutscher Fernsehpreis (Best Information Programme)
- 2006: Hildegard-von-Bingen-Preis für Publizistik
- 2009: Goldene Kamera (Best Information)
