= Christian Sievers =

German television presenter and journalist

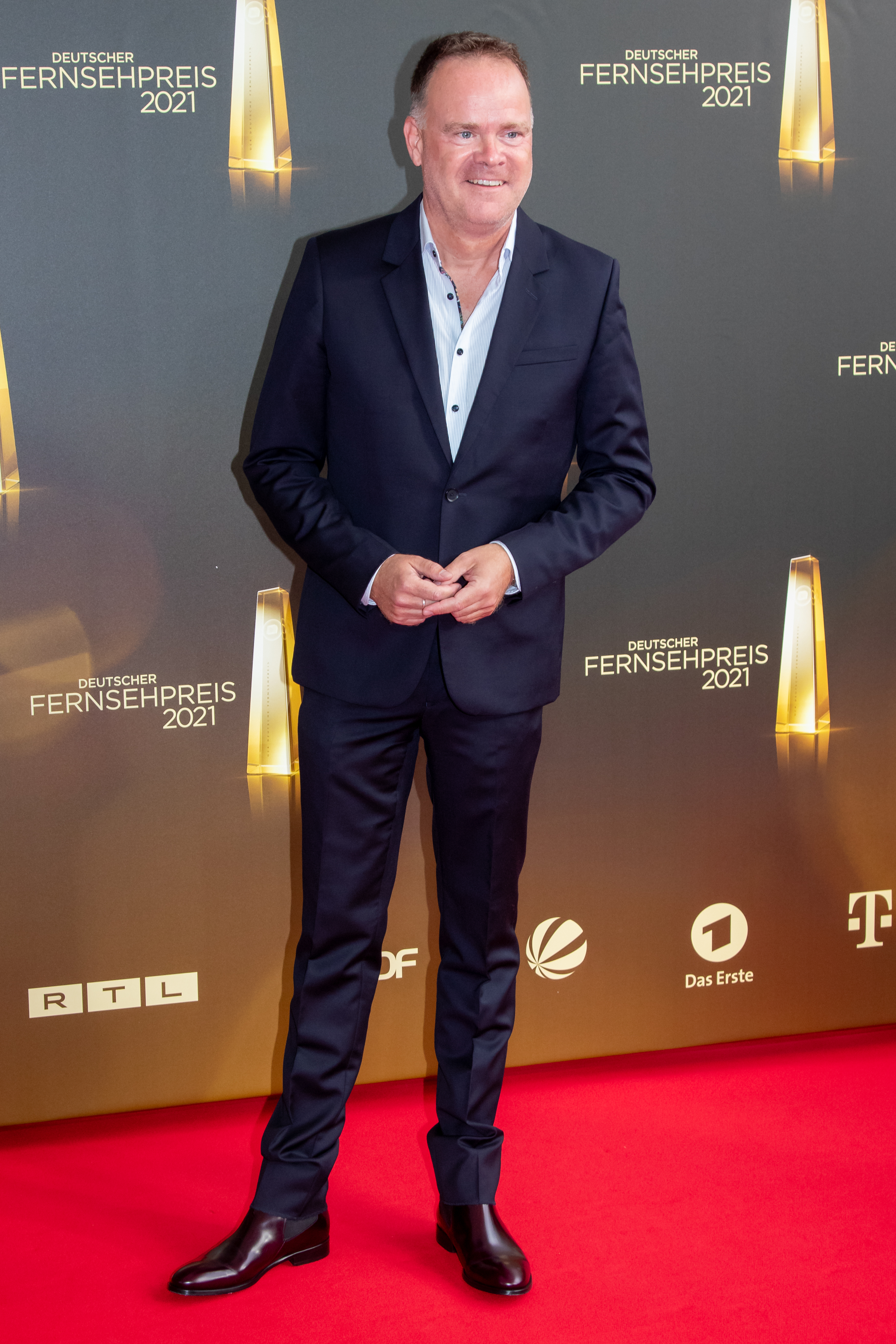
Christian Sievers at the German Television Award 2021

Christian Sievers (born 10 December 1969 in Offenbach am Main) is a German journalist and evening news anchor.

== Career ==
After graduating secondary school with his Abitur in 1989, Sievers studied law in Berlin and Freiburg. During his studies, he also worked at various radio and television stations: from 1989 to 1991 as a reporter at RIAS Berlin, as a presenter and reporter at Südwestfunk in Freiburg between 1991 and 1993, and from 1993 to 1995 as a presenter and editor at the same station in Baden-Baden. In 1995, Sievers completed his first law Staatsexamen. Between 1996 and 1997, Sievers worked as a reporter at the ABC station WTNH in New Haven, Connecticut, as a fellow of the Carl Duisberg Society.

Since 1997, Sievers has been a presenter, reporter and editor for ZDF. From 1997 to 2009, Sievers presented the ZDF Morgenmagazin, ZDF's breakfast programme.

From 2008 to 2009, Sievers presented the graphics and statistics sections of ZDF's election broadcasts, replacing Steffen Seibert.

From October 2009 to August 2014, Sievers was ZDF's Middle East correspondent, based in Tel Aviv.

In January 2013 he replaced Maybrit Illner as presenter of heute-journal, of which he acted as a relief presenter; from 2014 to 2022, Sievers has also been chief presenter of the 7 pm edition of heute.

Since January 2022 he has been the primary anchor of heute-journal, ZDF‘s flagship evening newscast.
