= Warendorf (electoral district) =

Federal electoral district of Germany

129 Warendorf
- Electoral district for the Bundestag
- Warendorf in 2025
- State: North Rhine-Westphalia
- Population: 277,800 (2019)
- Electorate: 208,754 (2021)
- Major settlements: Ahlen; Warendorf; Beckum
- Area: 1,319.4 km^{2}

Current electoral district
- Created: 1949
- Party: CDU
- Member: Henning Rehbaum
- Elected: 2021, 2025

Warendorf is an electoral constituency (German: Wahlkreis) represented in the Bundestag. It elects one member via first-past-the-post voting. Under the current constituency numbering system, it is designated as constituency 129. It is located in northern North Rhine-Westphalia, comprising the district of Warendorf.

Warendorf was created for the inaugural 1949 federal election. Since 2021, it has been represented by Henning Rehbaum of the Christian Democratic Union (CDU).

== Geography ==
Warendorf is located in northern North Rhine-Westphalia. As of the 2021 federal election, it is coterminous with the district of Warendorf.

== History ==
Warendorf was created in 1949, then known as Beckum – Warendorf. It acquired its current name in the 1980 election. In the 1949 election, it was North Rhine-Westphalia constituency 37 in the numbering system. From 1953 through 1961, it was number 96. From 1965 through 1976, it was number 94. From 1980 through 1998, it was number 100. From 2002 through 2009, it was number 131. In the 2013 through 2021 elections, it was number 130. From the 2025 election, it has been number 129.

Originally, the constituency comprised the districts of Warendorf and Beckum. Since the 1980 election, it has been coterminous with the district of Warendorf.

| Election | No. | Name | Borders |
|---|---|---|---|
| 1949 | 37 | Beckum – Warendorf | Beckum district; Warendorf district |
| 1953 | 96 | Beckum – Warendorf | Beckum district; Warendorf district |
| 1957 | 96 | Beckum – Warendorf | Beckum district; Warendorf district |
| 1961 | 96 | Beckum – Warendorf | Beckum district; Warendorf district |
| 1965 | 94 | Beckum – Warendorf | Beckum district; Warendorf district |
| 1969 | 94 | Beckum – Warendorf | Beckum district; Warendorf district |
| 1972 | 94 | Beckum – Warendorf | Beckum district; Warendorf district |
| 1976 | 94 | Beckum – Warendorf | Beckum district; Warendorf district |
| 1980 | 100 | Warendorf | Warendorf district |
| 1983 | 100 | Warendorf | Warendorf district |
| 1987 | 100 | Warendorf | Warendorf district |
| 1990 | 100 | Warendorf | Warendorf district |
| 1994 | 100 | Warendorf | Warendorf district |
| 1998 | 100 | Warendorf | Warendorf district |
| 2002 | 131 | Warendorf | Warendorf district |
| 2005 | 131 | Warendorf | Warendorf district |
| 2009 | 131 | Warendorf | Warendorf district |
| 2013 | 130 | Warendorf | Warendorf district |
| 2017 | 130 | Warendorf | Warendorf district |
| 2021 | 130 | Warendorf | Warendorf district |
| 2025 | 129 | Warendorf | Warendorf district |

== Members ==
The constituency has been held continuously by the Christian Democratic Union (CDU) since its creation. It was first represented by Bernhard Raestrup from 1949 to 1957. Heinrich Windelen then served from 1957 to 1990. Peter Paziorek was representative from 1990 to 2009. Reinhold Sendker was elected in 2009, and re-elected in 2013 and 2017. He was succeeded by Henning Rehbaum in 2021, who was re-elected in 2025.

| Election | Member | Party | % |
|---|---|---|---|
| 1949 | Bernhard Raestrup | CDU | 41.7 |
| 1953 | Bernhard Raestrup | CDU | 67.5 |
| 1957 | Heinrich Windelen | CDU | 66.5 |
| 1961 | Heinrich Windelen | CDU | 63.0 |
| 1965 | Heinrich Windelen | CDU | 63.3 |
| 1969 | Heinrich Windelen | CDU | 60.5 |
| 1972 | Heinrich Windelen | CDU | 53.4 |
| 1976 | Heinrich Windelen | CDU | 54.5 |
| 1980 | Heinrich Windelen | CDU | 52.7 |
| 1983 | Heinrich Windelen | CDU | 58.4 |
| 1987 | Heinrich Windelen | CDU | 51.7 |
| 1990 | Peter Paziorek | CDU | 50.0 |
| 1994 | Peter Paziorek | CDU | 50.0 |
| 1998 | Peter Paziorek | CDU | 46.9 |
| 2002 | Peter Paziorek | CDU | 45.3 |
| 2005 | Peter Paziorek | CDU | 50.3 |
| 2009 | Reinhold Sendker | CDU | 49.0 |
| 2013 | Reinhold Sendker | CDU | 51.3 |
| 2017 | Reinhold Sendker | CDU | 46.4 |
| 2021 | Henning Rehbaum | CDU | 36.3 |
| 2025 | Henning Rehbaum | CDU | 41.6 |

== Election results ==
=== 2025 election ===
Federal election (2025): Warendorf
| Notes: | Blue background denotes the winner of the electorate vote. Pink background denotes a candidate elected from their party list. Yellow background denotes an electorate win by a list member, or other incumbent. A ✓ or ✗ denotes status of any incumbent, win or lose respectively. | | | | | | |
| Party | Candidate | Votes | % | ±% | Party votes | % | ±% |
|---|---|---|---|---|---|---|---|
| CDU | ✓ Henning Rehbaum | 72,681 | 41.6 | ▲5.4 | 64,092 | 36.6 | ▲5.2 |
| SPD | Dennis Kocker | 36,284 | 20.8 | ▼10.0 | 32,533 | 18.6 | ▼10.3 |
| AfD | Dennis Dinter | 27,935 | 16.0 | ▲9.8 | 27,955 | 16.0 | ▲9.6 |
| Greens | Anja Beiers | 18,940 | 10.9 | ▼2.1 | 19,715 | 11.3 | ▼2.9 |
| Left | Selmar Ibrahimović | 9,798 | 5.6 | ▲3.1 | 10,496 | 6.3 | ▲3.5 |
| BSW | | | | | 6,288 | 3.6 | |
| FDP | Markus Diekhoff | 5,119 | 2.9 | ▼4.8 | 7,133 | 4.1 | ▼7.0 |
| Tierschutzpartei | | | | | 1,729 | 1.1 | ▲0.6 |
| FW | Martin Pörtzel | 3,768 | 2.2 | | 1,354 | 0.8 | ▲0.2 |
| Volt | | | | | 990 | 0.6 | ▲0.4 |
| PARTEI | | | | ▼1.7 | 825 | 0.5 | ▼0.5 |
| dieBasis | | | | ▼1.1 | 358 | 0.2 | ▼0.7 |
| PdF | | | | | 307 | 0.2 | ▲0.1 |
| Team Todenhöfer | | | | | 251 | 0.1 | ▼0.2 |
| BD | | | | | 208 | 0.1 | |
| Values | | | | | 88 | 0.1 | |
| MERA25 | | | | | 61 | 0.0 | |
| MLPD | | | | | 28 | 0.0 | 0.0 |
| Pirates | | | | | | | ▼0.3 |
| ÖDP | | | | ▼0.3 | | | ▼0.1 |
| Gesundheitsforschung | | | | | | | ▼0.1 |
| Bündnis C | | | | | | | ▼0.1 |
| Humanists | | | | | | | ▼0.1 |
| SGP | | | | | | | 0.0 |
| Informal votes | | 1,440 | | | 1,037 | | |
| Total valid votes | | 174,525 | | | 174,928 | | |
| Turnout | | 175,965 | 84.7 | ▲5.3 | | | |
| CDU hold | Majority | 36,397 | 20.8 | | | | |

=== 2021 election ===
Federal election (2021): Warendorf
| Notes: | Blue background denotes the winner of the electorate vote. Pink background denotes a candidate elected from their party list. Yellow background denotes an electorate win by a list member, or other incumbent. A ✓ or ✗ denotes status of any incumbent, win or lose respectively. | | | | | | |
| Party | Candidate | Votes | % | ±% | Party votes | % | ±% |
|---|---|---|---|---|---|---|---|
| CDU | Henning Rehbaum | 59,631 | 36.3 | ▼10.1 | 51,722 | 31.4 | ▼8.9 |
| SPD | Bernhard Daldrup | 50,685 | 30.8 | ▲2.9 | 47,648 | 28.9 | ▲4.9 |
| Greens | Jessica Wessels | 21,245 | 12.9 | ▲7.4 | 23,309 | 14.2 | ▲7.5 |
| FDP | Oliver Niedostadek | 12,768 | 7.8 | ▲0.8 | 18,193 | 11.1 | ▼2.0 |
| AfD | Dennis Dinter | 10,211 | 6.2 | ▼0.6 | 10,533 | 6.4 | ▼1.0 |
| Left | Reiner Jenkel | 4,074 | 2.5 | ▼2.3 | 4,525 | 2.7 | ▼2.8 |
| Tierschutzpartei | | | | | 1,729 | 1.1 | ▲0.6 |
| PARTEI | Joachim Göbel | 2,772 | 1.7 | ▲0.5 | 1,553 | 0.9 | ▲0.3 |
| dieBasis | Thomas Hesse | 1,773 | 1.1 | | 1,518 | 0.9 | |
| FW | | | | | 1,014 | 0.6 | ▲0.3 |
| Independent | Marius Brehm | 709 | 0.4 | | | | |
| Team Todenhöfer | | | | | 635 | 0.4 | |
| Pirates | | | | | 535 | 0.3 | 0.0 |
| Volt | | | | | 351 | 0.2 | |
| LIEBE | | | | | 207 | 0.1 | |
| ÖDP | Ludger Gerhardt | 497 | 0.3 | | 200 | 0.1 | 0.0 |
| Gesundheitsforschung | | | | | 179 | 0.1 | 0.0 |
| LfK | | | | | 132 | 0.1 | |
| NPD | | | | | 128 | 0.1 | ▼0.1 |
| Bündnis C | | | | | 113 | 0.1 | |
| Humanists | | | | | 108 | 0.1 | 0.0 |
| V-Partei3 | | | | | 84 | 0.1 | 0.0 |
| du. | | | | | 62 | 0.0 | |
| PdF | | | | | 54 | 0.0 | |
| LKR | | | | | 33 | 0.0 | |
| DKP | | | | | 31 | 0.0 | 0.0 |
| SGP | | | | | 13 | 0.0 | 0.0 |
| MLPD | | | | | 13 | 0.0 | 0.0 |
| Informal votes | | 1,443 | | | 1,186 | | |
| Total valid votes | | 164,365 | | | 164,622 | | |
| Turnout | | 165,808 | 79.4 | ▲1.4 | | | |
| CDU hold | Majority | 8,946 | 5.5 | ▼13.0 | | | |

=== 2017 election ===
Federal election (2017): Warendorf
| Notes: | Blue background denotes the winner of the electorate vote. Pink background denotes a candidate elected from their party list. Yellow background denotes an electorate win by a list member, or other incumbent. A ✓ or ✗ denotes status of any incumbent, win or lose respectively. | | | | | | |
| Party | Candidate | Votes | % | ±% | Party votes | % | ±% |
|---|---|---|---|---|---|---|---|
| CDU | ✓ Reinhold Sendker | 75,017 | 46.4 | ▼4.9 | 65,357 | 40.3 | ▼6.8 |
| SPD | Bernhard Daldrup | 45,094 | 27.9 | ▼4.1 | 38,992 | 24.0 | ▼5.1 |
| FDP | Oliver Niedostadek | 11,291 | 7.0 | ▲4.7 | 21,175 | 13.1 | ▲7.6 |
| AfD | Joachim Multermann | 11,078 | 6.9 | ▲4.6 | 12,025 | 7.4 | ▲4.5 |
| Greens | Marion Schniggendiller | 8,968 | 5.5 | ▼0.4 | 10,815 | 6.7 | ▼0.6 |
| Left | Reiner Jenkel | 7,738 | 4.8 | ▲1.3 | 8,997 | 5.5 | ▲1.2 |
| PARTEI | Paulo da Silva | 1,886 | 1.2 | | 1,056 | 0.7 | ▲0.4 |
| Tierschutzpartei | | | | | 808 | 0.5 | |
| AD-DEMOKRATEN | | | | | 622 | 0.4 | |
| Pirates | | | | | 538 | 0.3 | ▼1.7 |
| Independent | Olaf Barton | 514 | 0.3 | | | | |
| FW | | | | | 472 | 0.3 | 0.0 |
| NPD | | | | | 271 | 0.2 | ▼0.5 |
| DM | | | | | 153 | 0.1 | |
| ÖDP | | | | | 153 | 0.1 | 0.0 |
| Volksabstimmung | | | | | 142 | 0.1 | ▼0.1 |
| V-Partei³ | | | | | 133 | 0.1 | |
| Gesundheitsforschung | | | | | 119 | 0.1 | |
| BGE | | | | | 102 | 0.1 | |
| DiB | | | | | 90 | 0.1 | |
| Die Humanisten | | | | | 69 | 0.0 | |
| MLPD | | | | | 30 | 0.0 | 0.0 |
| SGP | | | | | 13 | 0.0 | 0.0 |
| DKP | | | | | 12 | 0.0 | |
| Informal votes | | 1,945 | | | 1,387 | | |
| Total valid votes | | 161,586 | | | 162,144 | | |
| Turnout | | 163,531 | 78.0 | ▲2.9 | | | |
| CDU hold | Majority | 29,923 | 18.5 | ▼0.8 | | | |

=== 2013 election ===
Federal election (2013): Warendorf
| Notes: | Blue background denotes the winner of the electorate vote. Pink background denotes a candidate elected from their party list. Yellow background denotes an electorate win by a list member, or other incumbent. A ✓ or ✗ denotes status of any incumbent, win or lose respectively. | | | | | | |
| Party | Candidate | Votes | % | ±% | Party votes | % | ±% |
|---|---|---|---|---|---|---|---|
| CDU | ✓ Reinhold Sendker | 80,272 | 51.3 | ▲2.3 | 73,764 | 47.1 | ▲6.5 |
| SPD | Bernhard Daldrup | 50,056 | 32.0 | ▼0.6 | 45,609 | 29.1 | ▲4.8 |
| Greens | Alexander Ringbeck | 9,300 | 5.9 | | 11,305 | 7.2 | ▼2.2 |
| Left | Karl Stephan Schulte | 5,488 | 3.5 | ▼4.3 | 6,858 | 4.4 | ▼2.0 |
| FDP | Johannes Philipper | 3,533 | 2.3 | ▼8.4 | 8,486 | 5.4 | ▼9.9 |
| AfD | | 3,455 | 2.2 | | 4,571 | 2.9 | |
| Pirates | Sebastian Wiesendahl | 3,163 | 2.0 | | 3,123 | 2.0 | ▲0.5 |
| NPD | | 1,134 | 0.7 | | 1,090 | 0.7 | ▲0.1 |
| FW | | | | | 378 | 0.2 | |
| PARTEI | | | | | 329 | 0.2 | |
| Volksabstimmung | | | | | 223 | 0.1 | ▲0.1 |
| ÖDP | | | | | 178 | 0.1 | 0.0 |
| PRO | | | | | 147 | 0.1 | |
| REP | | | | | 122 | 0.1 | ▼0.1 |
| Nichtwahler | | | | | 93 | 0.1 | |
| Party of Reason | | | | | 70 | 0.0 | |
| BIG | | | | | 53 | 0.0 | |
| RRP | | | | | 53 | 0.0 | ▼0.1 |
| PSG | | | | | 29 | 0.0 | 0.0 |
| BüSo | | | | | 25 | 0.0 | 0.0 |
| MLPD | | | | | 23 | 0.0 | 0.0 |
| Die Rechte | | | | | 4 | 0.0 | |
| Informal votes | | 1,684 | | | 1,552 | | |
| Total valid votes | | 156,401 | | | 156,533 | | |
| Turnout | | 158,085 | 75.2 | ▲1.2 | | | |
| CDU hold | Majority | 30,216 | 19.3 | ▲2.9 | | | |

=== 2009 election ===
Federal election (2009): Warendorf
| Notes: | Blue background denotes the winner of the electorate vote. Pink background denotes a candidate elected from their party list. Yellow background denotes an electorate win by a list member, or other incumbent. A ✓ or ✗ denotes status of any incumbent, win or lose respectively. | | | | | | |
| Party | Candidate | Votes | % | ±% | Party votes | % | ±% |
|---|---|---|---|---|---|---|---|
| CDU | Reinhold Sendker | 75,187 | 49.0 | ▼1.3 | 62,706 | 40.6 | ▼1.7 |
| SPD | Bernhard Daldrup | 49,996 | 32.6 | ▼5.5 | 37,608 | 24.4 | ▼10.7 |
| FDP | Jutta Wonnemann | 16,333 | 10.6 | ▲6.9 | 23,668 | 15.3 | ▲4.7 |
| Greens | | | | | 14,609 | 9.5 | ▲3.4 |
| Left | Reiner Jenkel | 12,005 | 7.8 | ▲4.7 | 9,824 | 6.4 | ▲2.5 |
| Pirates | | | | | 2,308 | 1.5 | |
| NPD | | | | | 977 | 0.6 | 0.0 |
| Tierschutzpartei | | | | | 688 | 0.4 | ▲0.1 |
| FAMILIE | | | | | 685 | 0.4 | 0.0 |
| RENTNER | | | | | 443 | 0.3 | |
| REP | | | | | 302 | 0.2 | 0.0 |
| RRP | | | | | 132 | 0.1 | |
| ÖDP | | | | | 119 | 0.1 | |
| Volksabstimmung | | | | | 112 | 0.1 | 0.0 |
| Centre | | | | | 107 | 0.1 | 0.0 |
| DVU | | | | | 82 | 0.1 | |
| PSG | | | | | 16 | 0.0 | 0.0 |
| BüSo | | | | | 14 | 0.0 | 0.0 |
| MLPD | | | | | 8 | 0.0 | 0.0 |
| Informal votes | | 2,696 | | | 1,809 | | |
| Total valid votes | | 153,521 | | | 154,408 | | |
| Turnout | | 156,217 | 73.9 | ▼7.0 | | | |
| CDU hold | Majority | 25,191 | 16.4 | ▲4.2 | | | |

=== 2005 election ===
Federal election (2005): Warendorf
| Notes: | Blue background denotes the winner of the electorate vote. Pink background denotes a candidate elected from their party list. Yellow background denotes an electorate win by a list member, or other incumbent. A ✓ or ✗ denotes status of any incumbent, win or lose respectively. | | | | | | |
| Party | Candidate | Votes | % | ±% | Party votes | % | ±% |
|---|---|---|---|---|---|---|---|
| CDU | ✓ Peter Paziorek | 84,140 | 50.3 | ▲4.9 | 70,698 | 42.3 | ▲0.6 |
| SPD | Reinhard Schultz | 63,717 | 38.1 | ▼1.7 | 58,675 | 35.1 | ▼3.4 |
| Greens | Gerhard Nergert | 6,619 | 4.0 | ▼0.3 | 10,103 | 6.0 | ▼0.5 |
| FDP | Karl-Heinz Wonsak | 6,324 | 3.8 | ▼5.5 | 17,695 | 10.6 | 0.0 |
| Left | Walter Rottstaedt | 5,301 | 3.2 | ▲2.3 | 6,489 | 3.9 | ▲3.0 |
| NPD | Markus Pohl | 1,329 | 0.8 | | 1,102 | 0.7 | ▲0.5 |
| Familie | | | | | 700 | 0.4 | ▲0.2 |
| Tierschutzpartei | | | | | 564 | 0.3 | ▲0.1 |
| REP | | | | | 384 | 0.2 | ▼0.1 |
| GRAUEN | | | | | 374 | 0.2 | ▲0.1 |
| PBC | | | | | 126 | 0.1 | |
| From Now on... Democracy Through Referendum | | | | | 112 | 0.1 | |
| Centre | | | | | 66 | 0.0 | |
| Socialist Equality Party | | | | | 38 | 0.0 | |
| MLPD | | | | | 28 | 0.0 | |
| BüSo | | | | | 24 | 0.0 | 0.0 |
| Informal votes | | 2,227 | | | 2,479 | | |
| Total valid votes | | 167,430 | | | 167,178 | | |
| Turnout | | 169,657 | 81.0 | ▼2.6 | | | |
| CDU hold | Majority | 20,423 | 12.2 | | | | |
