= Eifel Literature Festival =

Literature event

The Eifel Literatur Festival (German: Eifel Literatur Festival) is a volunteer-organized literature event held in the Eifel mountains in the German state of Rhineland-Palatinate every two years as part of the state's "Cultural Summer".

The aim of the festival is to raise the Eifel onto the European literature stage. The festival originated from a private initiative by Germanic scholar, Dr. Josef Zierden. In 1994, he inaugurated the Eifel Literature Festival in the town of Prüm, in the small cashier's room of a bank, as an accompanying programme for the presentation of his book "The Eifel in Literature".

== History ==
Until 2001, the focus was on belletristic literature from or about the Eifel. Later the literary programme was expanded: the Eifel was to become a literary stage for authors outside the Eifel, for example, for Martin Walser, Mario Adorf and Siegfried Lenz in 2001.

Having taken place for a week in the autumn, from 1994 to 1998, its duration was extended to readings from May to November.

In 2006, the 7th Eifel Literature Festival went beyond the boundaries of the county of Bitburg-Prüm and recorded over 10,000 visitors at about 20 readings in the neighbouring counties of Daun (today Vulkaneifel), Bernkastel-Wittlich, Ahrweiler and Mayen-Koblenz as well as Euskirchen and Mayen-Koblenz in the state of North Rhine-Westphalia.

== 2008 Festival ==
The eighth festival in 2008 covered all ten counties of the Eifel - all the way to North Rhine-Westphalia. Authors were also invited as guests in the German-speaking Community of Belgium. The 2008 festival ran from 25 April to 14 November.

The weekly programme included 30 events at 18 venues with authors and recitators, from Martin Walser to Iris Berben, from Senta Berger to Father Anselm Grün, from Petra Gerster to Dirk Sager, Urs Widmer and Ingo Schulze to Roger Willemsen.

== 2010 Festival ==
With around 15,000 visitors at 28 events, the 9th Eifel Literature Festival in 2010 was the most successful in its history With about 1,100 visitors to the monastery church of Himmerod Abbey, Father Anselm Grün set the record for the number of visitors. For the first time a festival journal was published in spring and autumn 2010: with many interviews, photo documentaries and background information on past and upcoming events. The magazine buchjournal ranked the festival among the twelve most important literary events of 2010.

== International Eifel Literature Prize ==
In 2008, the 1st International Eifel Literature Prize was awarded, with 15,000 euros for the first prize and 3,000 euros for the 'advancement award' (Förderpreis). The international character of the literature prize is intended to reflect the cross-border character of the festival. The jury (Martin Lüdke, head of SWR Literature, Literatur im Foyer, chairman; Sigrid Löffler, Literaturen; and Volker Hage, Der Spiegel") chose British writer A. L. Kennedy (Glasgow), one of the most important contemporary voices in Great Britain, for the main prize. She awarded the advancement prize to Wolfgang Herrndorf (Berlin).

== Prizes ==
- Eifel Award 2010 of the Zukunftsinitiative Eifel (ZIE), awarded in March 2011 at the ITB Berlin.
- Wolf von Reis Cultural Prize of the Eifel Club 2011, awarded in May 2011 in Hellenthal/ Eifel.

== Authors ==
Authors who have been guests at the Eifel Literature Festival include: Mario Adorf, Simon Beckett, Klaus Bednarz, Iris Berben, Senta Berger, Peter Bichsel, Norbert Blüm, Tom Buhrow & Sabine Stamer, Michael Degen, Friedrich Christian Delius, Joachim C. Fest, Arved Fuchs, Sigfrid Gauch, Heiner Geißler, Hans-Dietrich Genscher, Petra Gerster, Ralph Giordano, Dietrich Grönemeyer, Anselm Grün, Gisbert Haefs, Volker Hage, Ulla Hahn, Petra Hammesfahr, Elke Heidenreich, Judith Hermann, Wolfgang Herrndorf, Corinne Hofmann, Tommy Jaud, Margot Käßmann, Wladimir Kaminer, Daniel Kehlmann, Walter Kempowski, A. L. Kennedy, Imre Kertész, Bodo Kirchhoff, Pavel Kohout, Sibylle Knauss, Ursula Krechel, Sabine Kuegler, Günter Kunert, Sarah Kuttner, Benjamin Lebert, Wolfgang Leonhard, Günter Lamprecht, Siegfried Lenz, Erich Loest, Martin Lüdke, Roger Manderscheid, Margriet de Moor, Martin Mosebach, Herta Müller, Sten Nadolny, Leoluca Orlando, Hanns-Josef Ortheil, Christoph Peters, Fritz Pleitgen, Ulrich Plenzdorf, Erika Pluhar, Richard David Precht, Christoph Ransmayr, Katja Riemann, Harry Rowohlt, Peter Rühmkorf, David Safier, Rüdiger Safranski, Dirk Sager, Frank Schätzing, Rafik Schami, Maximilian Schell, Éric-Emmanuel Schmitt, Peter Scholl-Latour, Bernd Schroeder, Rainer Maria Schröder, Ingo Schulze, Alice Schwarzer, Arnold Stadler, Martin Suter, Leonie Swann, Uwe Timm, Günter Wallraff, Martin Walser, Christine Westermann, Urs Widmer, Roger Willemsen, Gabriele Wohmann and Juli Zeh.
