= Menne =

Menne or Mennes is a surname that may refer to:

== Menne ==
- Al Menne, American singer
- Bob Menne (born 1942), American golfer
- Dave Menne (born 1974), American mixed martial arts fighter
- Peter Menne (born 1960), German production designer, stage designer, painter and musician
- Wilhelm Menne (1910–1945), German rower

== Mennes ==
- John Mennes (1599–1671), English Naval officer
- Wim Mennes (born 1977), Belgium footballer
