= Grafenwalder =

Beer Brand

Grafenwalder is a private brand beer sold at Lidl supermarkets. It has four known products, Grafenwalder Pilsner, Grafenwalder Spezial, Grafenwalder Hefe-Weißbier and Grafenwalder Strong. It is usually sold in plastic bottles, cans or 5l mini kegs. It is made by Lindenbrauerei in Unna, owned by the Oetker Group and by Frankfurter Brauhaus in Frankfurt (Oder).

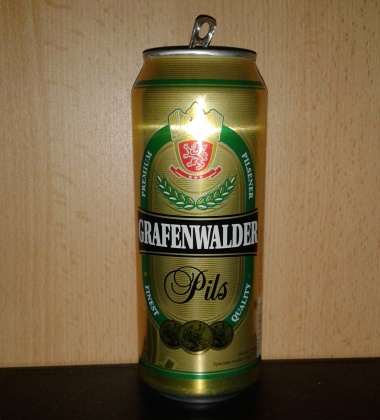
A can of Grafenwalder Pils

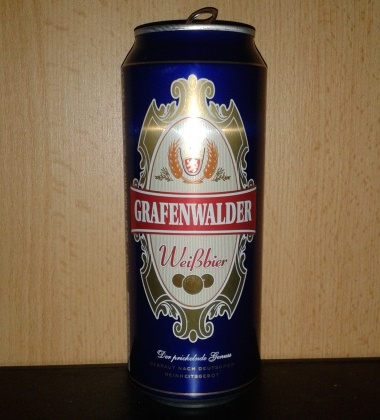
A can of Grafenwalder Weißbier

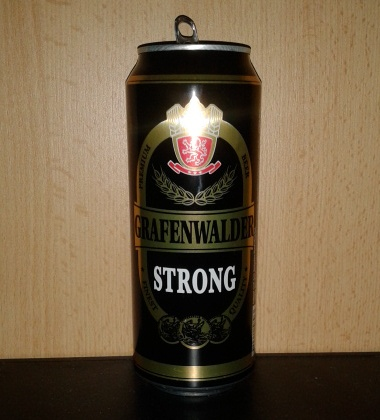
A can of Grafenwalder Strong

== See also ==
- Beer in Germany
