= Unna =

- Town
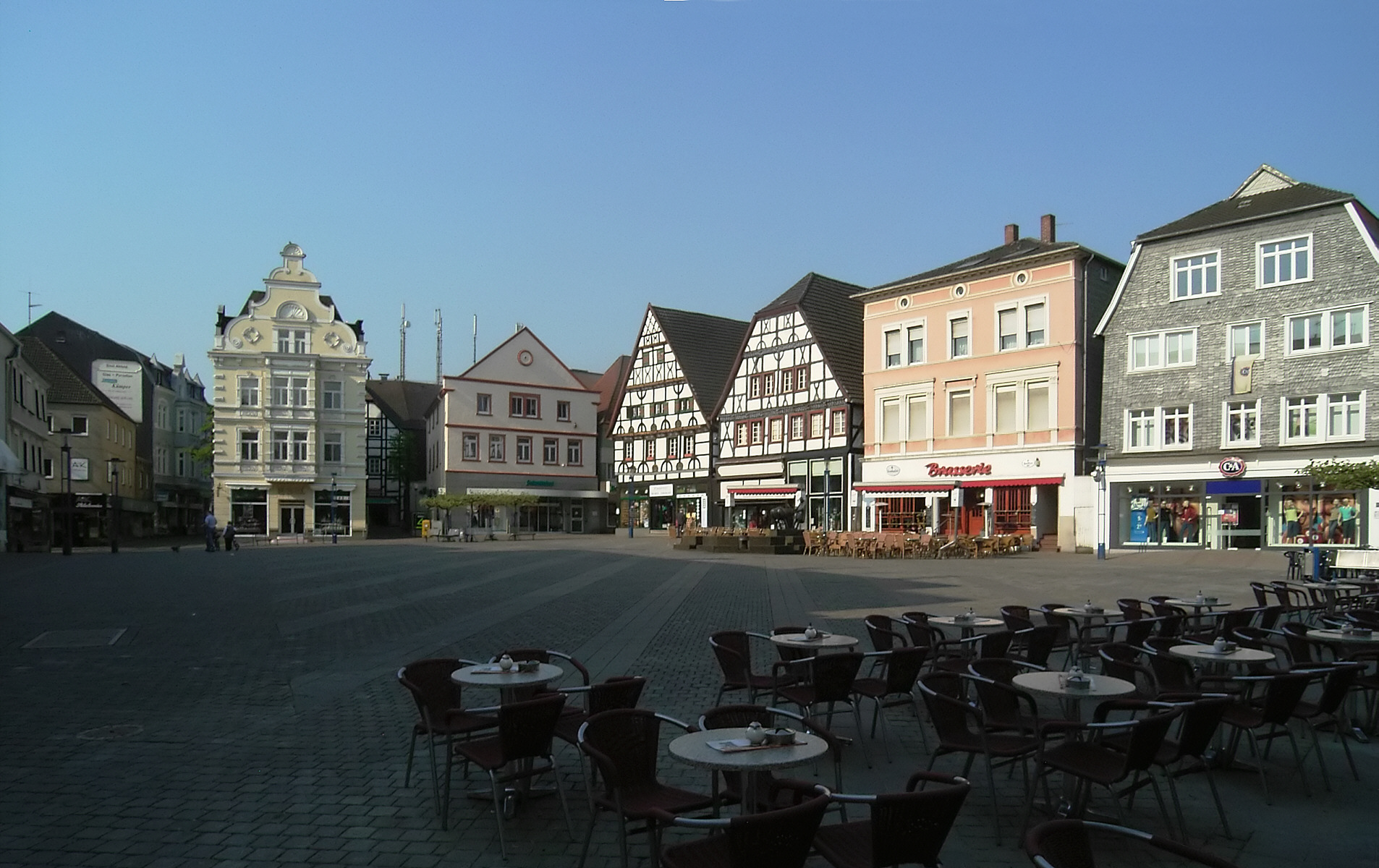
- The Old Market in Unna

- Flag Coat of arms

- Location of Unna within Unna district
- Interactive map of Unna
- Location within Germany Location within North Rhine-Westphalia
- Coordinates: 51°32′05″N 7°41′20″E
- Country: Germany
- State: North Rhine-Westphalia
- Admin. region: Arnsberg
- District: Unna

Government
  - Mayor (2020–25): Dirk Wigant (CDU)

Area
  - Total: 88.56 km^{2} (34.19 sq mi)
- Elevation: 142 m (466 ft)

Population (2025-12-31)
  - Total: 57,961
  - Density: 654.5/km^{2} (1,695/sq mi)
- Time zone: UTC+01:00 (CET)
  - Summer (DST): UTC+02:00 (CEST)
- Postal codes: 59423, 59425, 59427
- Dialling codes: 02303, 02308
- Vehicle registration: UN
- Website: www.unna.de

Unna (German pronunciation: [ˈʊna]) is a city of around 59,000 people in North Rhine-Westphalia, Germany, the seat of the Unna district.

The newly refurbished Unna station has trains to all major cities in North Rhine Westphalia including Dortmund, Cologne, Münster, Hamm, Düsseldorf and Wuppertal. There is also the Regional-Express 7 (Rhein-Münsterland-Express), which runs from Rheine via Cologne to Krefeld.

== Geography ==
Unna is situated on an ancient salt-trading route, the Westphalian Hellweg. Trade on this route and during the period of the Hanseatic League came from as far as London. The city is located at the eastern extremity of the Ruhr district, about 15 kilometres (9 miles) east of the centre of Dortmund. Unna also serves as a dormitory city, being home to many commuters who work in Dortmund and other nearby cities. Local dialects of German include Westfälisch and Ruhrpott. The recreational district of Sauerland is nearby. The River Ruhr runs just south of Unna through Fröndenberg, before heading through the main part of the Ruhr district.

=== Districts ===
Unna consists of the following districts:

- Unna (city centre)
- Königsborn
- Massen
- Afferde
- Billmerich
- Kessebüren
- Mühlhausen and Uelzen
- Lünern and Stockum
- Hemmerde, Westhemmerde and Siddinghausen

Massen and Königsborn are former industrial and mining areas; the other districts have a more rural character.

== History ==
The history of human settlement in what is now the city of Unna can be traced back to the Neolithic Era.

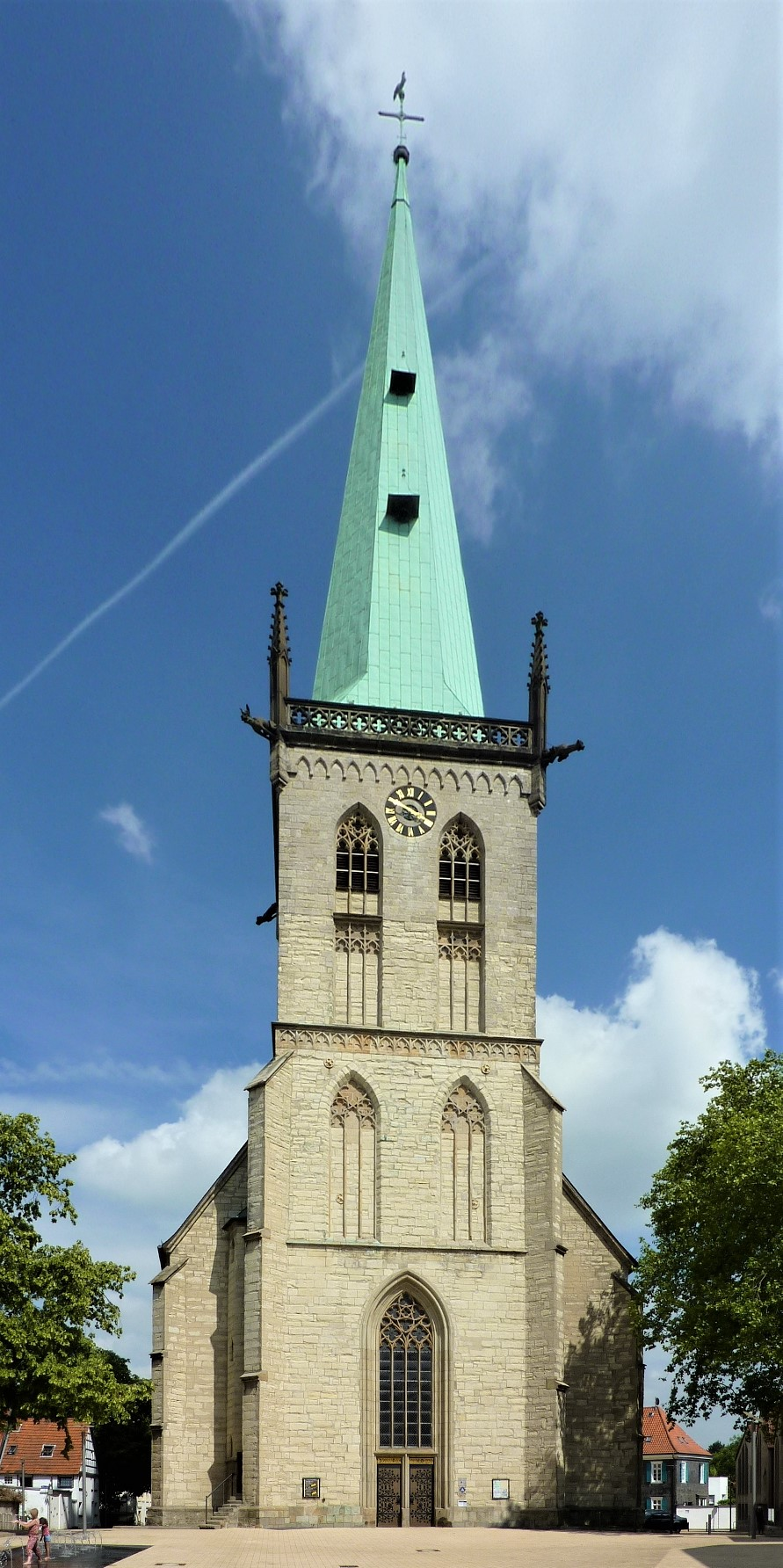
The medieval Gothic Church

In the Middle Ages, Unna gained significance as a way station on the Hellweg. It is first recorded by name in an ecclesiastical document of 1032. Around 1200, Count Friedrich von Altena-Isenberg was invested with the fiefdom of Unna, among other estates, by the archbishop-electorate of Cologne. Over the next few hundred years the town was repeatedly fought over, and burned down several times. In the 14th century the town became wealthy: a mint was established and regional trade blossomed. This is documented by the discovery of around 70 gold coins during excavation works in 1952. The coins originated from various countries and are thought to have been buried around 1375.

From the mid-15th century on, the city was a notable trade centre and member of the Hanseatic League. In 1597 more than half the population died of the Bubonic plague. In the early 17th century, the town changed hands several times in religious wars, and in 1666 fell under the control of Prussia. In the early 19th century, the primary character of the town started to change from agricultural to industrial, with improved communications by road, rail and waterways. Coal mining started in 1870, together with industries dependent on it. The population rose from around 2,500 at the start of the 19th century to 15,000 in 1900.

At the beginning of the 19th century, the city district Königsborn (then Bad Königsborn) gained prominence as a health resort with mineral springs. The cityscape of Königsborn still shows many historic buildings from that era, and the former spa gardens still serve as a recreation place for locals and tourists. In 2013, a geological survey showed that the mineral springs could still be used for health purposes.

During the Second World War, in 1943-45 there were major air attacks directed at the significant barracks and other military installations in the city. In the older part of the city, there are many half-timbered buildings built between the 16th and 19th centuries. Unna's economy was largely based on agriculture until the 19th century, when it became industrialised. After World War II, the artisan district which had survived bombing was largely torn down to make way for modern development; however many of the buildings have been restored.

== Population ==
Historical population

Year	Pop.	±% p.a.
1965	49,173	—
1970	50,299	+0.45%
1975	54,480	+1.61%
1980	56,419	+0.70%
1985	58,782	+0.82%
1990	61,552	+0.93%
1995	66,475	+1.55%

Year	Pop.	±% p.a.
2000	71,375	+1.43%
2005	68,264	−0.89%
2010	66,502	−0.52%
2015	59,111	−2.33%
2020	58,816	−0.10%
2025	57,961	−0.29%

Source: Landesdatabank Nordrhein-Westfalen

== Culture ==
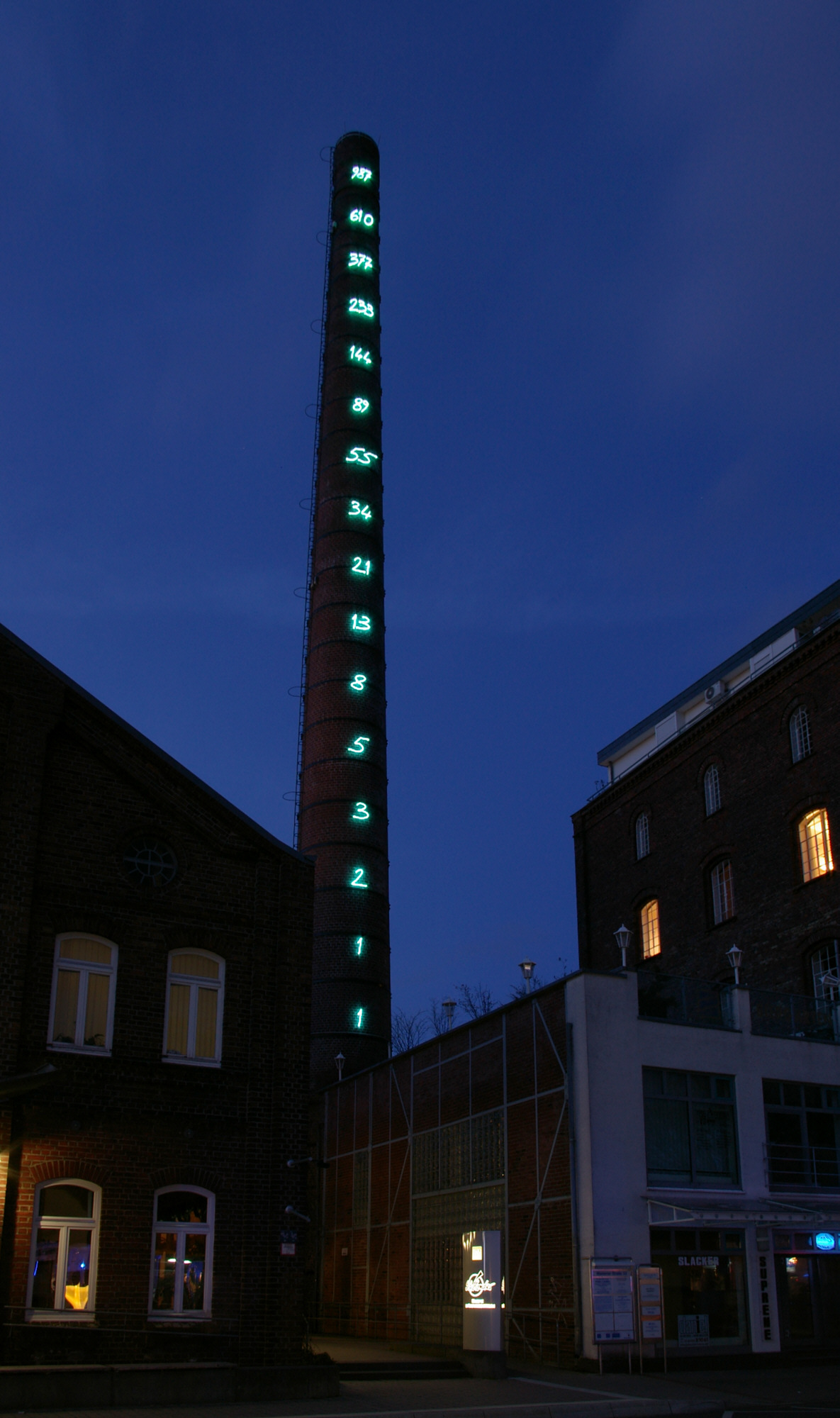
The Centre for International Light Art (CILA): Installation of Fibonacci numbers by Mario Merz.

Unna is seat of the world's only art museum dedicated exclusively to the collection and presentation of Light art, the Centre for International Light Art (CILA). It is located in the former Linden brewery, a red brick industrial building complex dating from the 19th century close to the heart of the city. Its landmark is an installation of Fibonacci numbers by Italian artist Mario Merz on the brewery's chimney (the thirteenth-century mathematician Leonardo Fibonacci lived in Pisa, twinned with Unna since 1996). The light art installations are integrated into the industrial structures of the brewery's former cellar vaults. The former brewery buildings are also home to the city library, the adult education centre (Volkshochschule), and the tourist information centre.

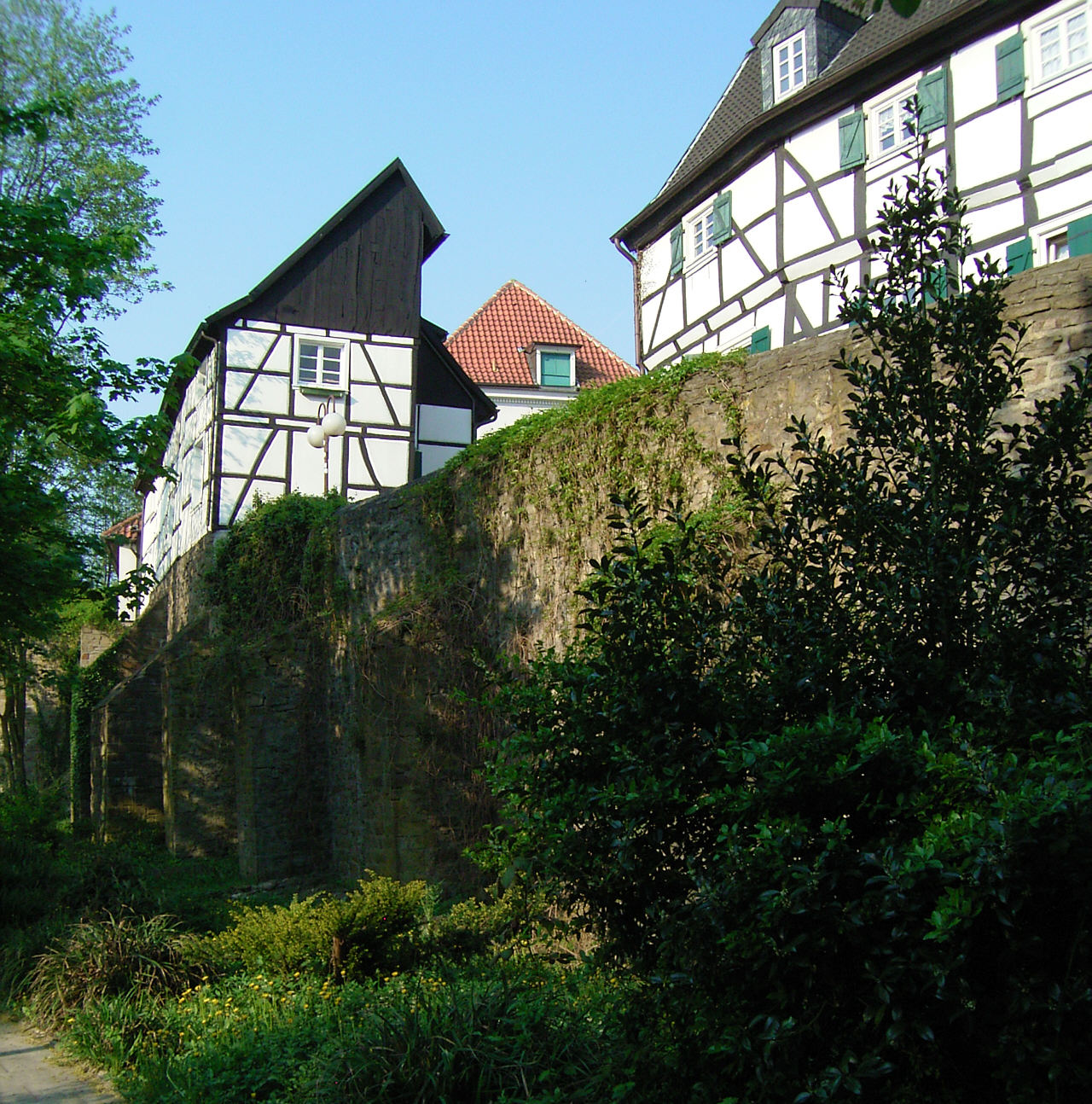
Part of the medieval city wall

Unna's Hellweg Museum, a regional history museum, is located in the medieval Unna castle. Many historic buildings as well as parts of the city wall, including towers near the artisan quarter, remain intact and in good condition. Unna holds the largest Italian festival north of Italy every two years (happily named Un(n)a Festa Italiana), when buildings are decorated with light installations by artists from Bari in Italy. An annual Christmas market and a city festival are located in the Old Market Square, stretching from there through the pedestrian area to the city hall.

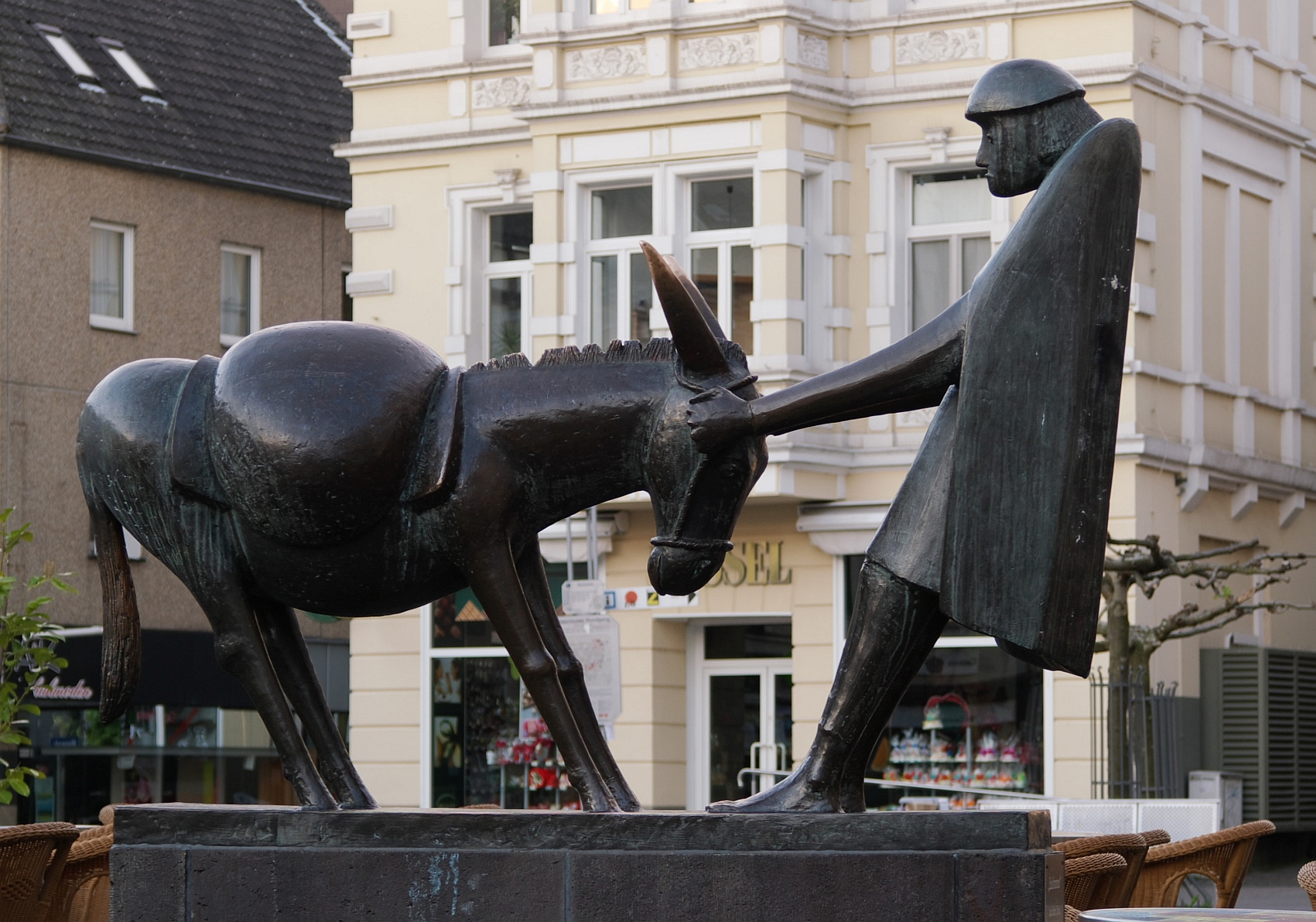
Donkey fountain in the city square (Josef Baron)

Unna is home to a large community of artists, some of whose works are on public display in the city. In the Old Market Square, e.g., there is a statue by painter and sculptor Josef Baron, depicting a man pulling a stubborn donkey, which is the city mascot.

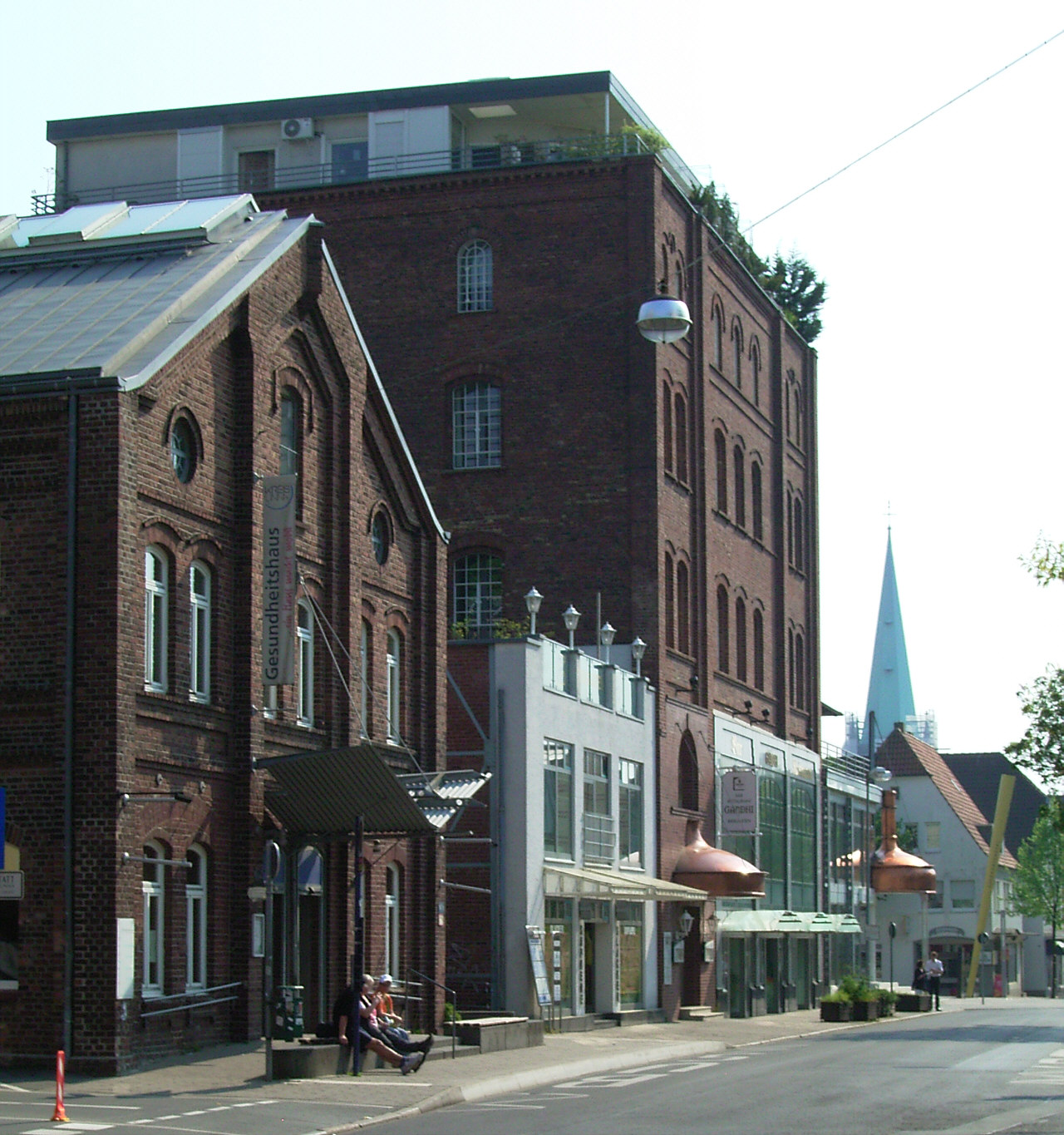
Former Brewery (Lindenbrauerei)

A common part of traditional German drinking culture, numerous breweries once formed part of the cityscape, of which the largest and most well known was the Lindenbrauerei (formerly Linden-Adler-Brauerei). It marketed its products under the name Lindenbier or Lindenpils. Most of the breweries have since closed down, but the Lindenbrauerei started a small-scale production again at the beginning of the 21st century. In common with other German towns, Unna also produces its own traditional herbal liquor, 'Herting Pörter', named after the city's Herting gate or 'port'. The liquor is produced near where the gate used to be, and is sold locally.

== Economy ==
Until the mid-nineteenth century the focus of Unna's economy was on the region's agriculture. Industrialisation rapidly followed. In contrast with the switch to service sector employment in some industrial towns further west in the Ruhr area, most of the jobs in Unna are still in heavy industry (iron and metal work, machine manufacturing) or craft based. Since 1972, the nickel alloys producer VDM Metals operates a melting and casting plant in Unna, for example. Also known is Alexis Tsiami, who has developed new methods for opening car doors.

In recent years Unna has boomed as a logistics centre. It houses the former distribution centre for the (recently much diminished) Karstadt department store chain; the distribution centre has been acquired by the DHL division of Deutsche Post. There is also a DPD distribution centre along with a central distribution depot for the pump producer Wilo. Another large logistics complex belonging to DHL came into operation in 2008.

== Twin towns – sister cities ==
Unna is twinned with:

- Waalwijk, Netherlands (1968)
- Enkirch, Germany (1969)
- Palaiseau, France (1969)
- Döbeln, Germany (1989)
- Ajka, Hungary (1990)
- Pisa, Italy (1996)

== Notable people ==
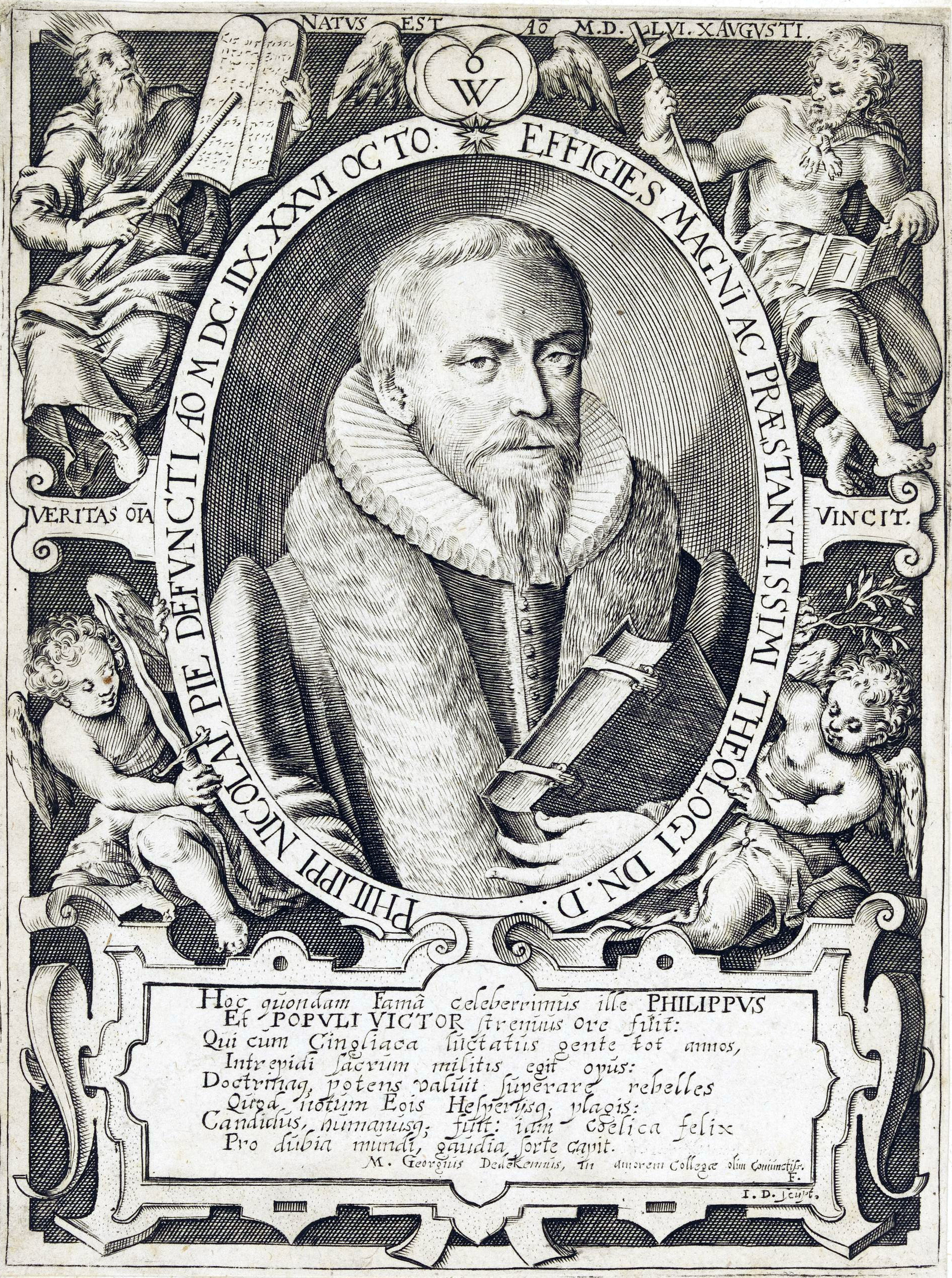
Philipp Nicolai

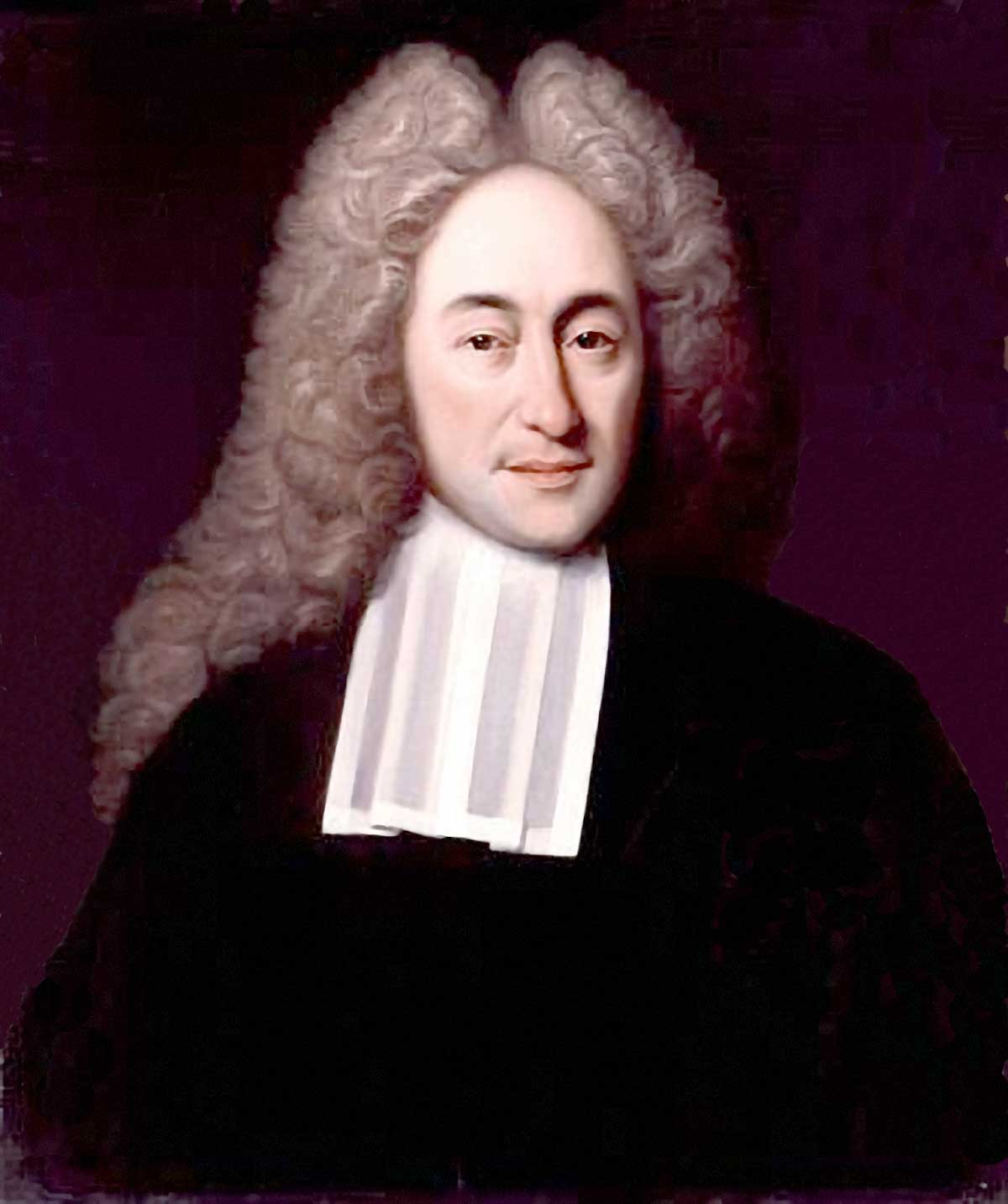
Karl Andreas Duker in 1718

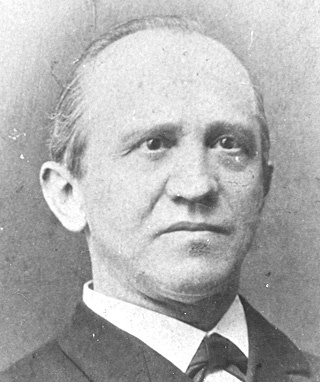
Hermann Cremer around 1890

- Johannes von Soest (1448–1506), medieval musician, music theorist, poet, and composer
- Philipp Nicolai (1556–1608), poet and composer, pastor in Unna in 1596–1601
- Karl Andreas Duker (1670–1752), philologist, rhetorician, historian, professor and rector of University of Utrecht
- Hermann Cremer (1834–1903), theologian
- Hermann Osthoff (1847–1909), linguist, co-founder of the Junggrammatiker
- Thea Rasche (1899–1971), artist
- Paul Verhoeven (1901–1975), actor and director
- Hermann Schomberg (1907–1975), actor
- Inge Donnepp (1918–2002), lawyer and politician
- Sibylle Knauss (born 1944), writer
- Roland Pröll (born 1949), pianist
- Peter F. Woeste (born 1950), cinematographer, director, professor at Capilano University
- Rudi Rauer (1950–2014), handball player
- Petra Reski (born 1958), journalist and writer
- Peter Menne (born 1960), set designer, painter
- Bernd Stelter (born 1961), singer and cabaret artist
- Sönke Möhring (born 1972), actor
- Giuseppe Reina (born 1972), footballer
- Marco Jakobs (born 1974), bobsledder
- Sabine Heinrich (born 1976), presenter
- Christofer Heimeroth (born 1981), footballer
- Christina Hammer (born 1990), boxer
- Laura Nolte (born 1998), bobsleigh pilot

== Gallery ==
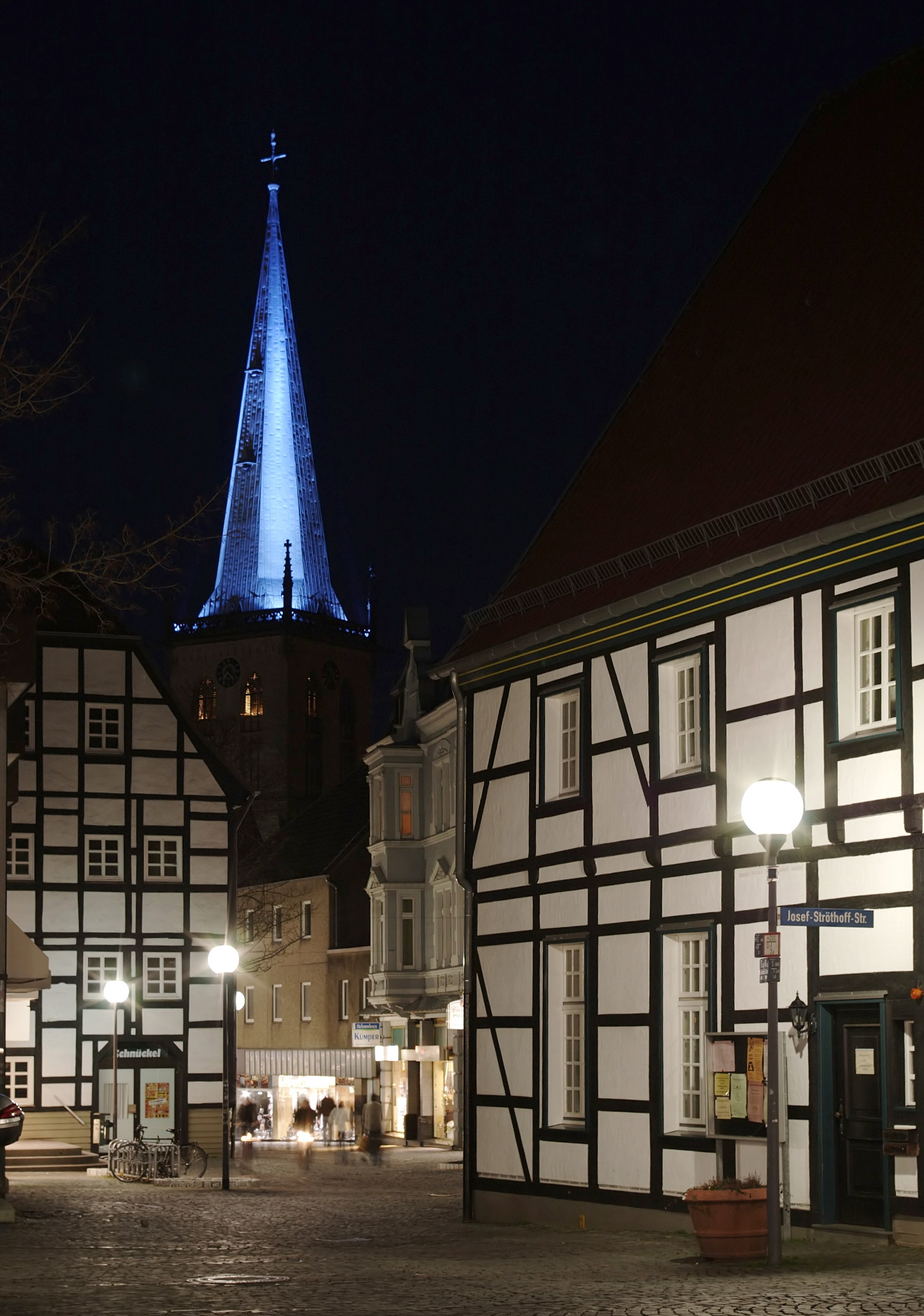
City church with evening lighting

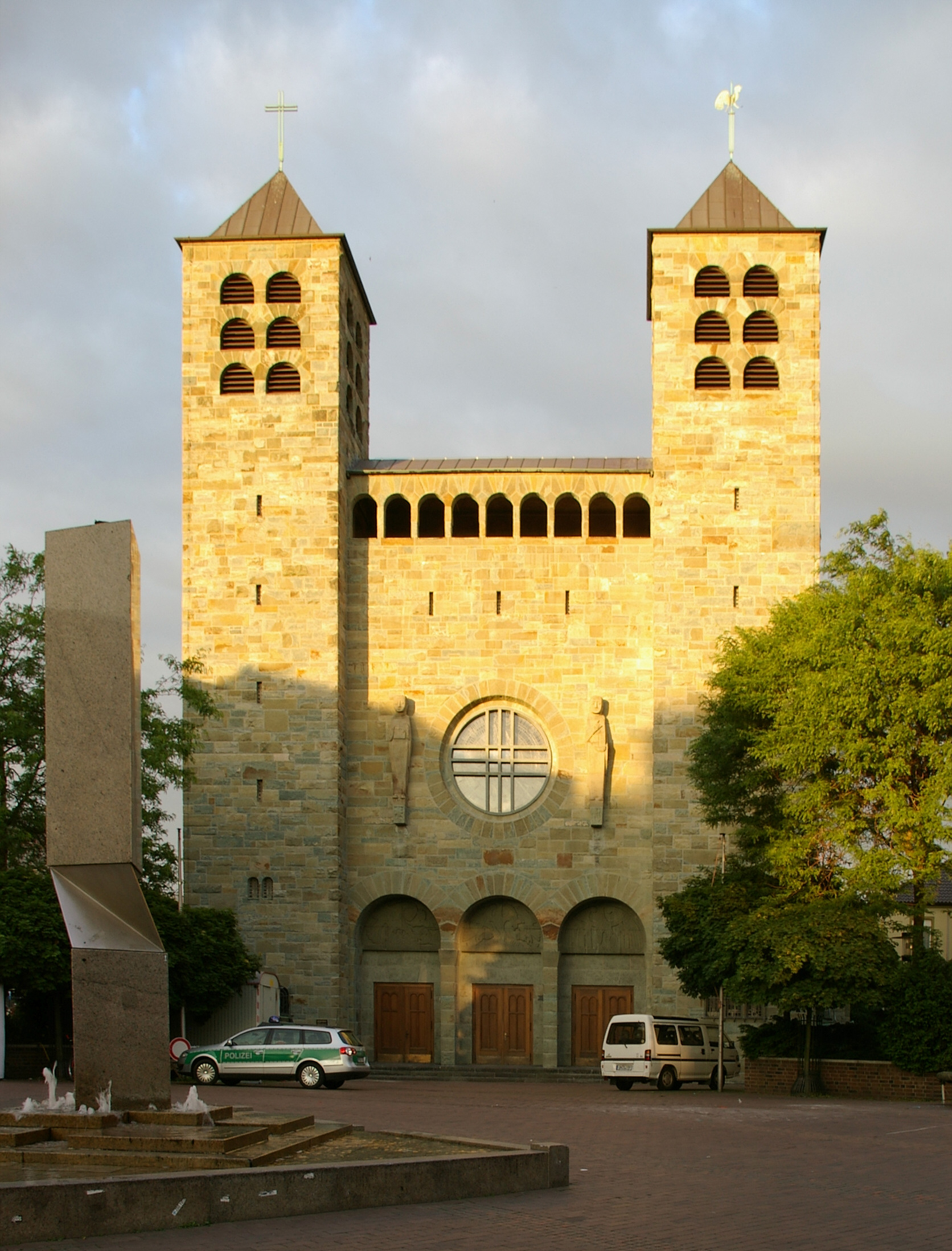
Church of St Catherine

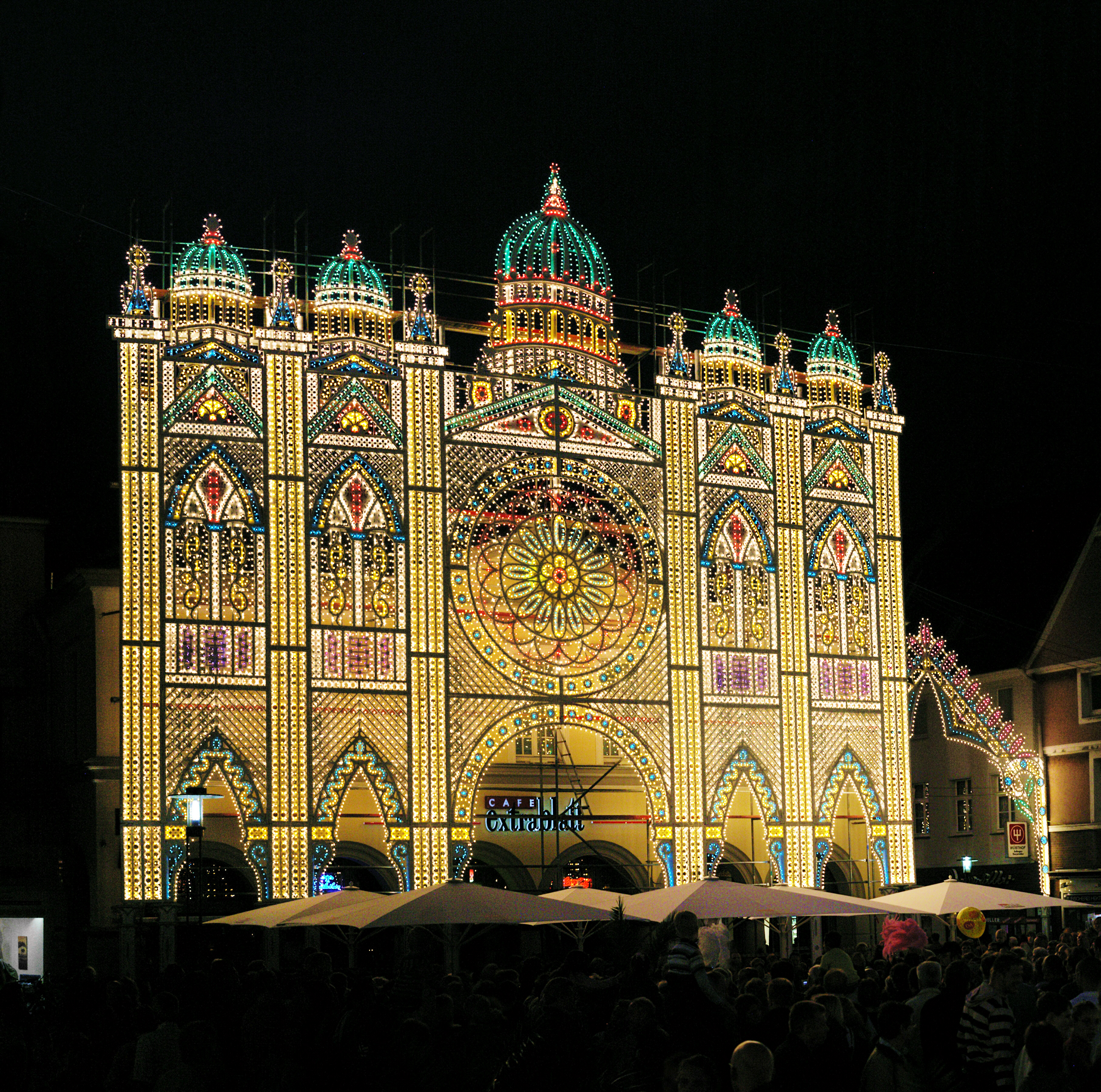
Italian Festival 2007

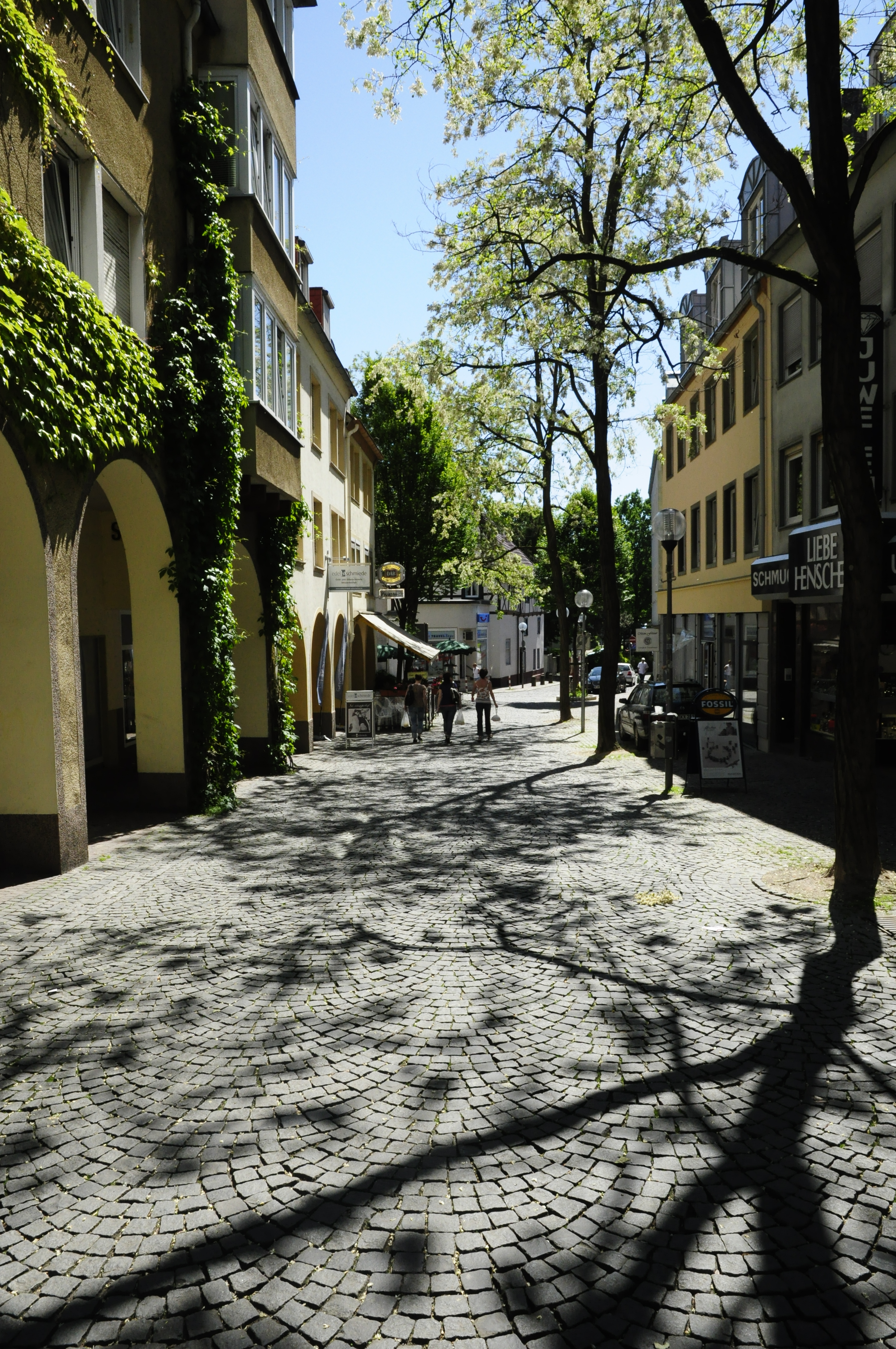
Looking down Wasserstraße - Waterstreet

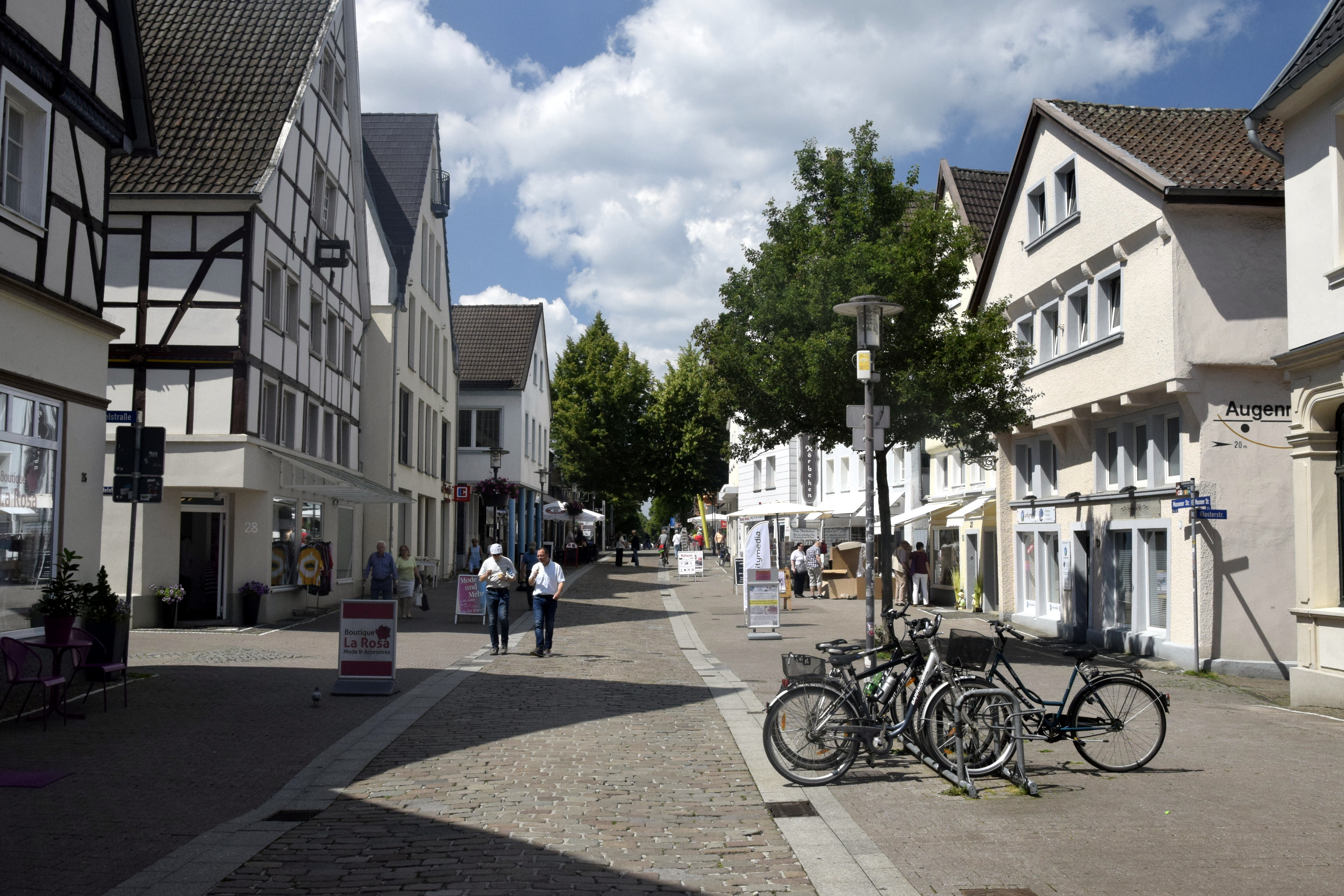
Unna, Inner City in direction of Lindenbrauerei

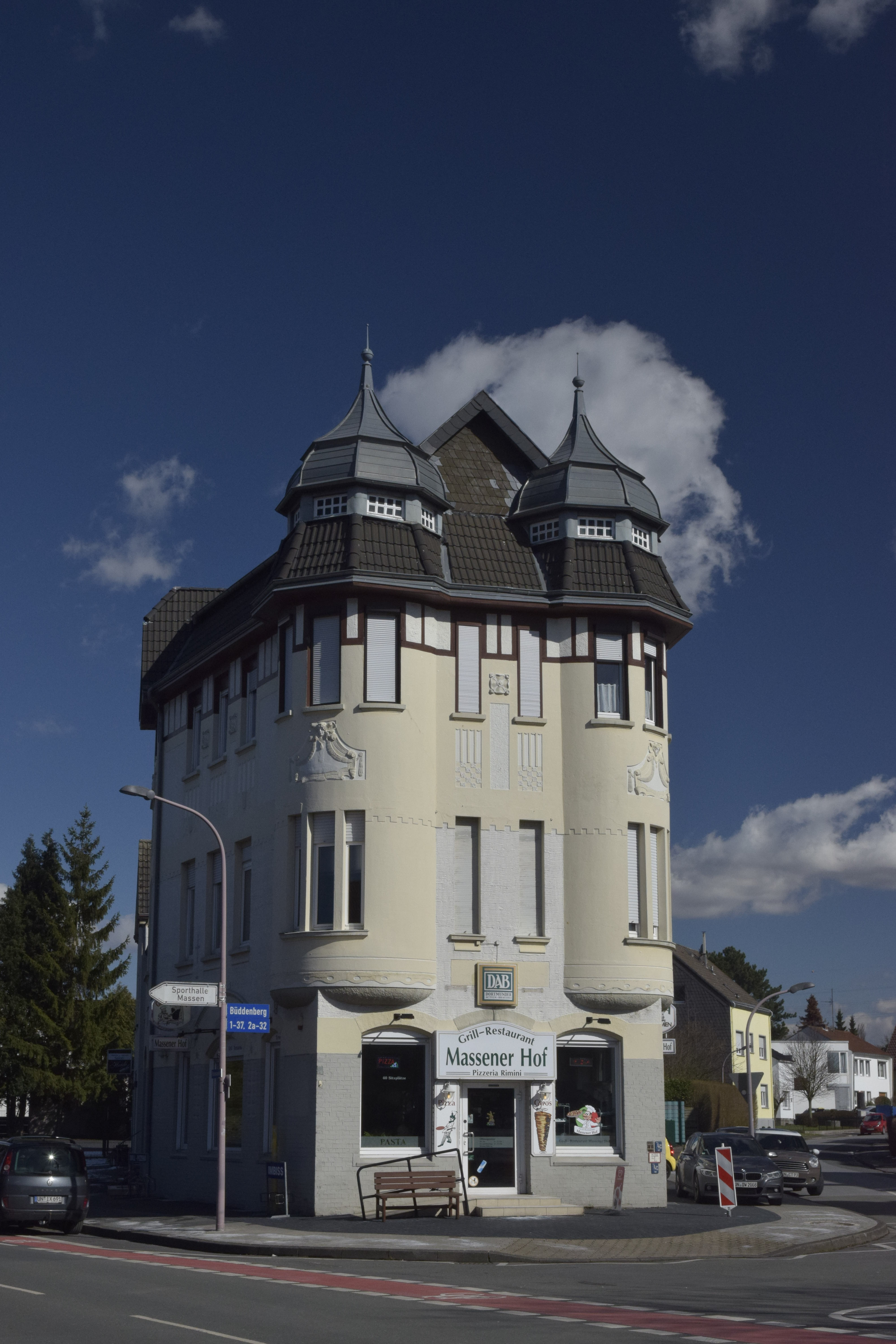
Massener Hof, Unna-Massen

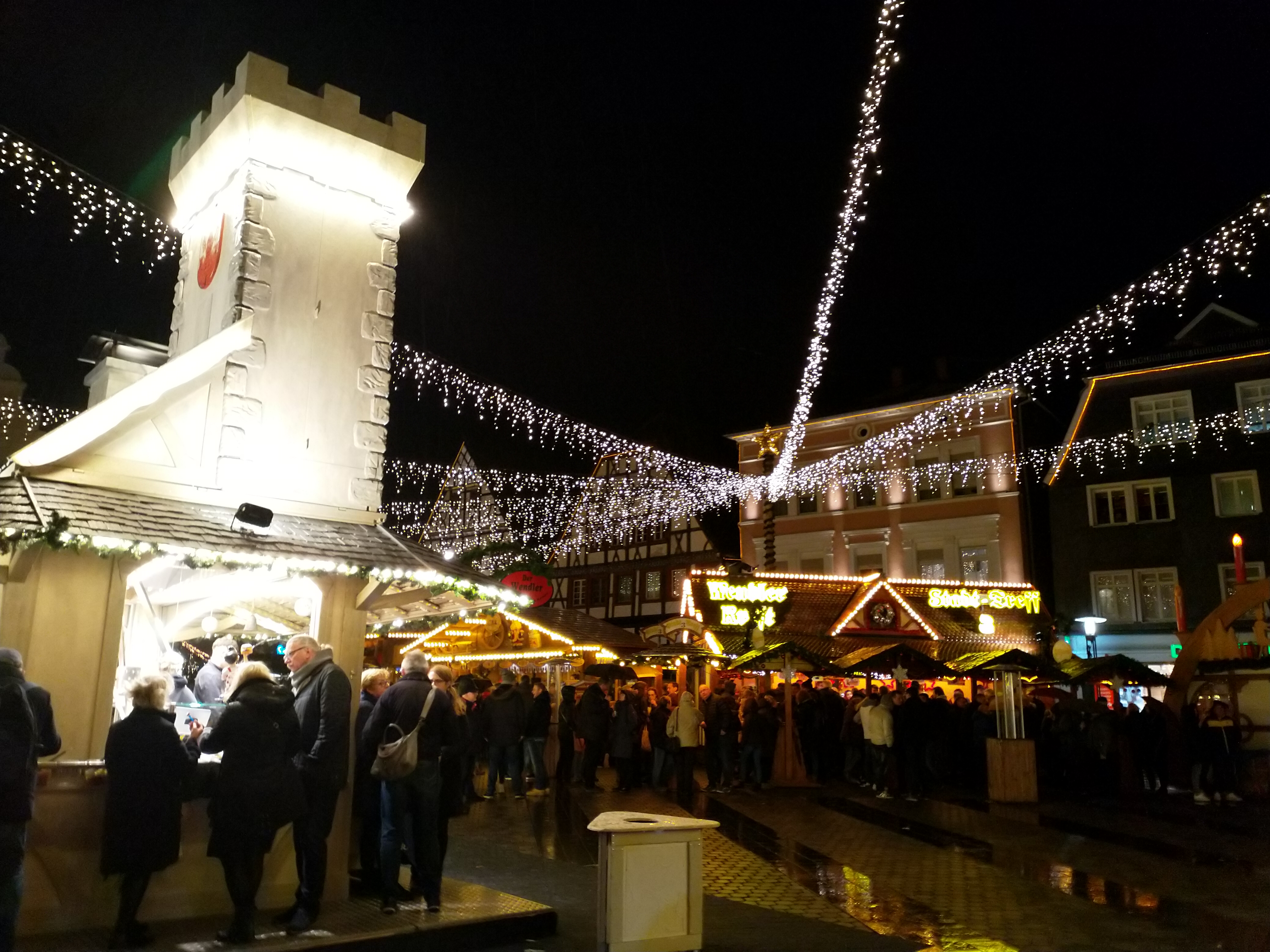
Unna, Weihnachtsmarkt 2018, Christmas market, Markt

== See also ==
- Grafenwalder, a private brand beer, made in Unna
