= Rudolf Rauer =

German handball player (1950-2014)

Rudolf "Rudi" Rauer (15 January 1950 – 15 July 2014) was West German handball player who competed in the 1976 Summer Olympics. He was born in Unna, North Rhine-Westphalia. In 1976 he was part of the West German team which finished fourth in the Olympic tournament. He played five matches as goalkeeper.
