= Bernhard Daldrup =

German politician (born 1956)

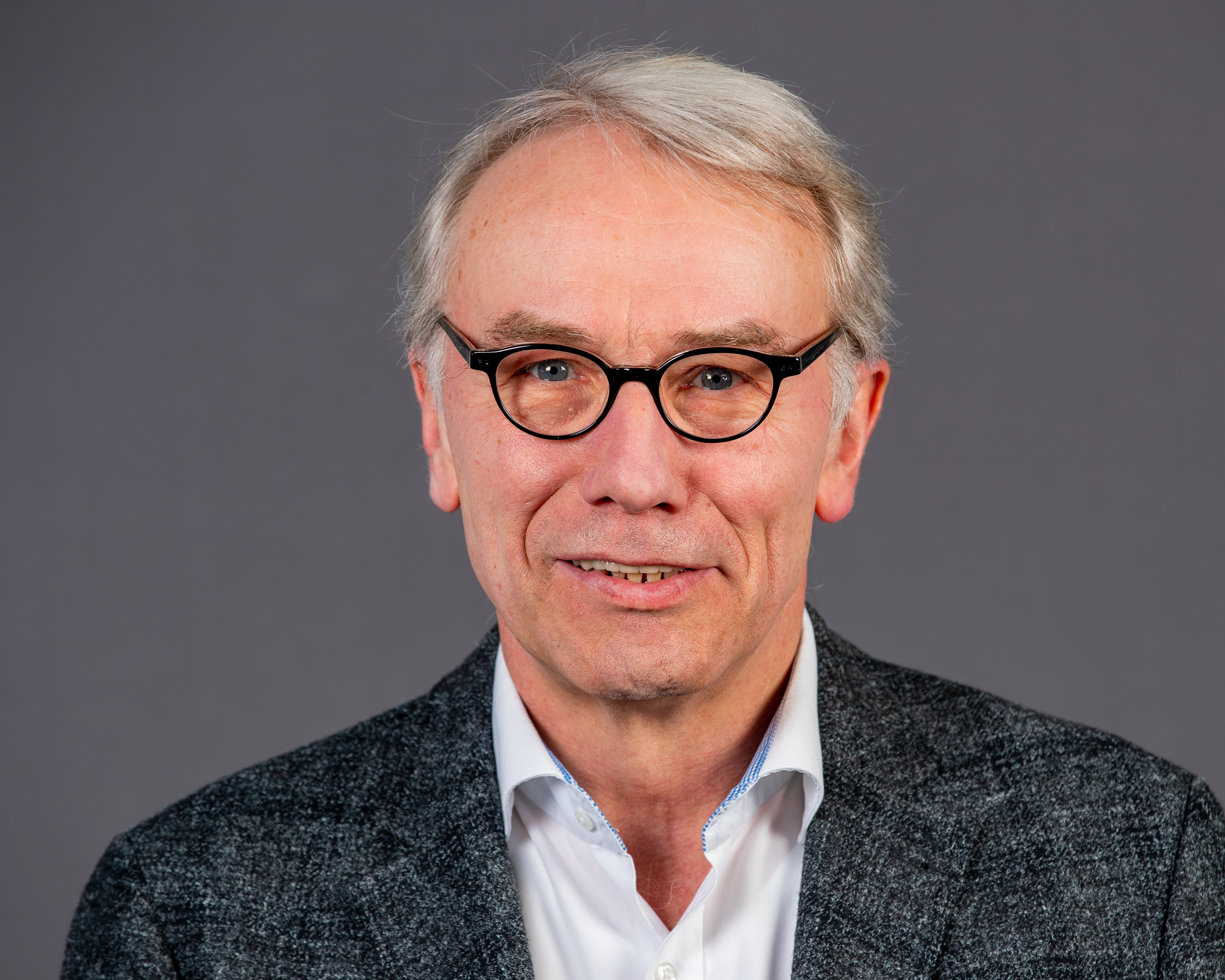
- Bernhard Daldrup in 2020

Member of the Bundestag
- In office 2013–2025

Personal details
- Born: 1 June 1956 (age 69) Sendenhorst, West Germany (now Germany)
- Party: SPD

Bernhard Daldrup (born 1 June 1956) is a German politician of the Social Democratic Party (SPD) who has been serving as a member of the Bundestag from the state of North Rhine-Westphalia from 2013 to 2025.

== Education and early career ==
Daldrup received his master's degree in 1983 after studying political science, philosophy and German literature at the University of Münster.

Daldrup then worked as an assistant, initially to the then State Minister of Justice Inge Donnepp, and later to Günter Harms, Member of the State Parliament. From 1986 to 1990 he was a lecturer at the University of Applied Sciences for Public Administration North Rhine-Westphalia. From 1991 to 2003 he was head of the Office for Urban Development and Economic Development of the City of Beckum.

== Political career ==
Since 2003, Daldrup has been the state manager of the Social Democratic Community for Local Government in North Rhine-Westphalia.

Daldrup first became a member of the Bundestag in the 2013 German federal election. In parliament, he was a member of the Committee for Construction, Housing, Urban Development and Communities and the Finance Committee. He was also his parliamentary group’s spokesperson for housing, urban development and construction.

In the negotiations to form a so-called traffic light coalition of the SPD, the Green Party and the FDP under Chancellor Olaf Scholz following the 2021 federal elections, Daldrup was part of his party's delegation in the working group on building and housing, chaired by Kevin Kühnert, Christian Kühn and Daniel Föst.

In October 2024, Daldrup announced that he would not stand in the 2025 federal elections but instead resign from active politics by the end of the parliamentary term.

== Political positions ==
Within his parliamentary group, Daldrup belonged to the Parliamentary Left, a left-wing movement.
