= Bernhard Raestrup =

German politician (1880–1959)

Deputy of the Provincial Landtag Province of Westphalia (Landtag President, 1931–1933)
- In office 21 February 1921 – 31 March 1933

Deputy of the Landtag of Prussia
- In office 5 March 1933 – 14 October 1933

Deputy of the Bundestag
- In office 7 September 1949 – 6 October 1957

Personal details
- Born: 25 January 1880 Oelde, Province of Westphalia, Kingdom of Prussia, German Empire
- Died: 20 July 1959 (aged 79) Oelde, West Germany
- Party: Christian Democratic Union of Germany
- Other political affiliations: Centre Party; Nazi Party

Bernhard Raestrup (25 January 1880 – 20 July 1959) was a German businessman and politician. He was successively a member of the Centre Party, the Nazi Party and the Christian Democratic Union (CDU). He was a long-serving deputy, and later the presiding officer, in the provincial Landtag of the Prussian Province of Westphalia. He then served as a deputy in the Landtag of Prussia during the last days of the Weimar Republic, and in the national Bundestag in the early years of the Federal Republic of Germany.

== Early life and career ==
Raestrup was born the son of a factory owner who ran a malt factory in Oelde. After attending high school in Münster and obtaining his Abitur, he attended a vocational school and completed a commercial apprenticeship. He then worked in his parents' business. In 1906, he also founded the stamping and enameling works Krone Raestrup & Co. in Oelde. During the Weimar Republic, he was chairman of the Association of West German Enamel Works. He also served as a commercial judge until 1933.

== Party memberships ==
Raestrup joined the Centre Party in 1919, initially serving as a district chairman from 1920, and as party chairman of the Province of Westphalia in 1931. On 1 April 1940, he applied for membership in the Nazi Party and was admitted on 1 July (membership number 8,073,697). After the end of the Second World War, he joined the Christian Democratic Union of Germany (CDU). From 1945, he was chairman of the Beckum CDU district association.

== Elected offices ==
Raestrup became a city councilor in Oelde. He was a member of the provincial parliament of the Province of Westphalia from 1921 to 1933 and served as its president from 1931 to 1933. In March 1933, he was elected as a deputy of the Landtag of Prussia, serving until its dissolution by the Nazis in October 1933.

In 1945, Raestrup was elected to the district council of the Beckum district. He was a deputy of the German Bundestag from its first election in the 1949 federal election until 1957. He represented the Bekum-Warendorf constituency as a directly elected member of parliament and was reelected at the 1953 federal election, receiving 67.5% of the first votes in 1953.

== Honors ==
- 1955: Grand Cross of Merit of the Federal Republic of Germany
- Bernhard-Raestrup-Platz in Oelde

== Sources ==
- Rudolf Vierhaus, Ludolf Herbst (eds.), Bruno Jahn (collaborators): Biographical Handbook of the Members of the German Bundestag. 1949–2002. Vol. 2: N–Z. Appendix. K. G. Saur, Munich 2002, ISBN 3-598-23782-0, pp. 663–664.
- Ernst Kienast (ed.): Handbook for the Prussian State Parliament, Edition for the 5th Electoral Period, Berlin 1933, p. 372.
