= Henning Rehbaum =

German politician

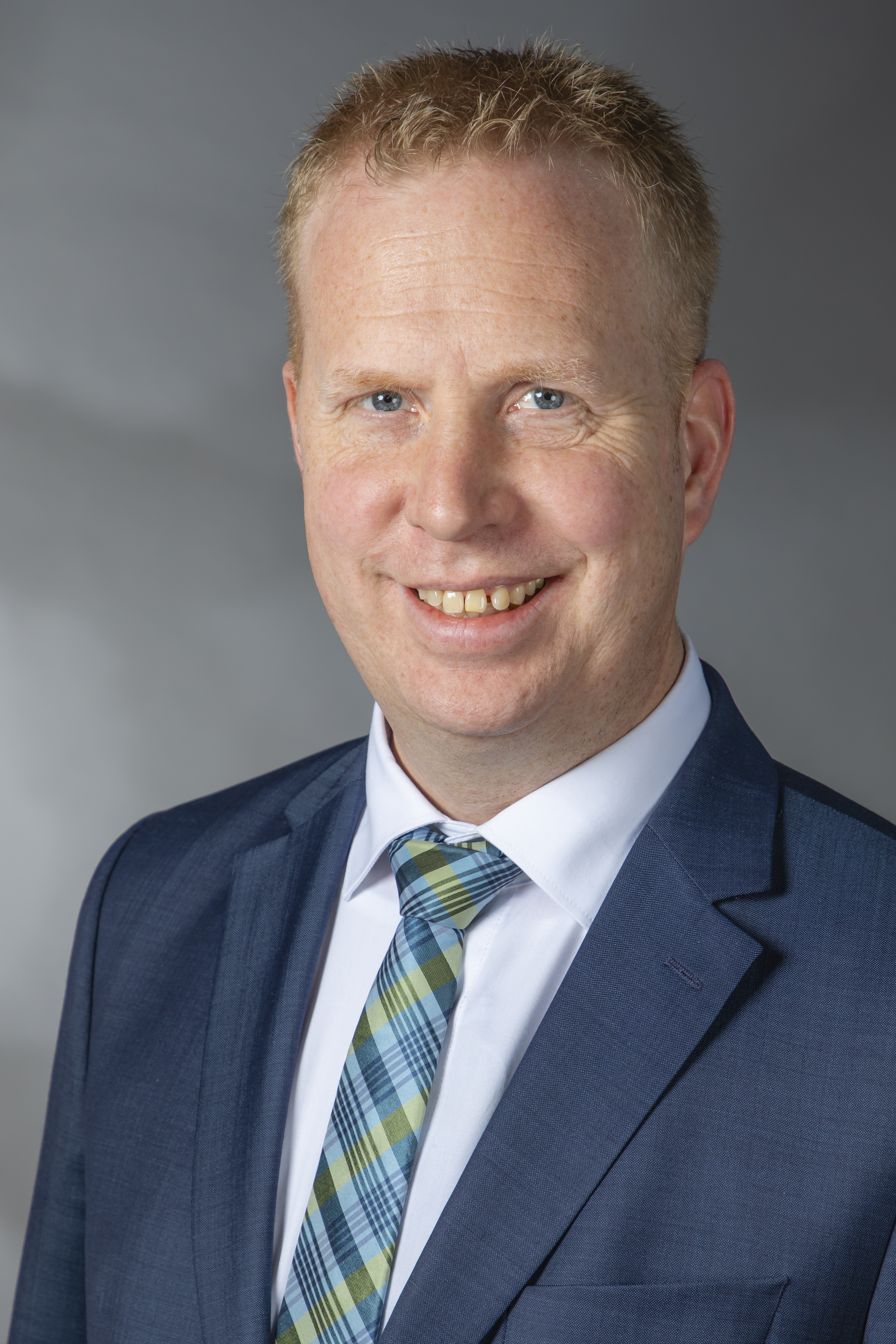

Member of the Bundestag
- Incumbent
- Assumed office 2021

Personal details
- Born: 10 September 1973 (age 53) Münster, West Germany
- Party: CDU
- Education: Heilbronn University of Applied Sciences

Henning Rehbaum (born 10 September 1973) is a German politician of the Christian Democratic Union (CDU) who has been serving as a member of the Bundestag since 2021.

== Political career ==
Rehbaum was a member of the State Parliament of North Rhine-Westphalia from 2012 to 2021.

In the 2021 elections, Rehbaum was elected directly to the Bundestag, representing the Warendorf district. He has since been serving on the Committee on Transport.

== Other activities ==
- Federal Network Agency for Electricity, Gas, Telecommunications, Posts and Railway (BNetzA), Alternate Member of the Rail Infrastructure Advisory Council (since 2022)
