= Sibylle Knauss =

German writer and academic (born 1944)

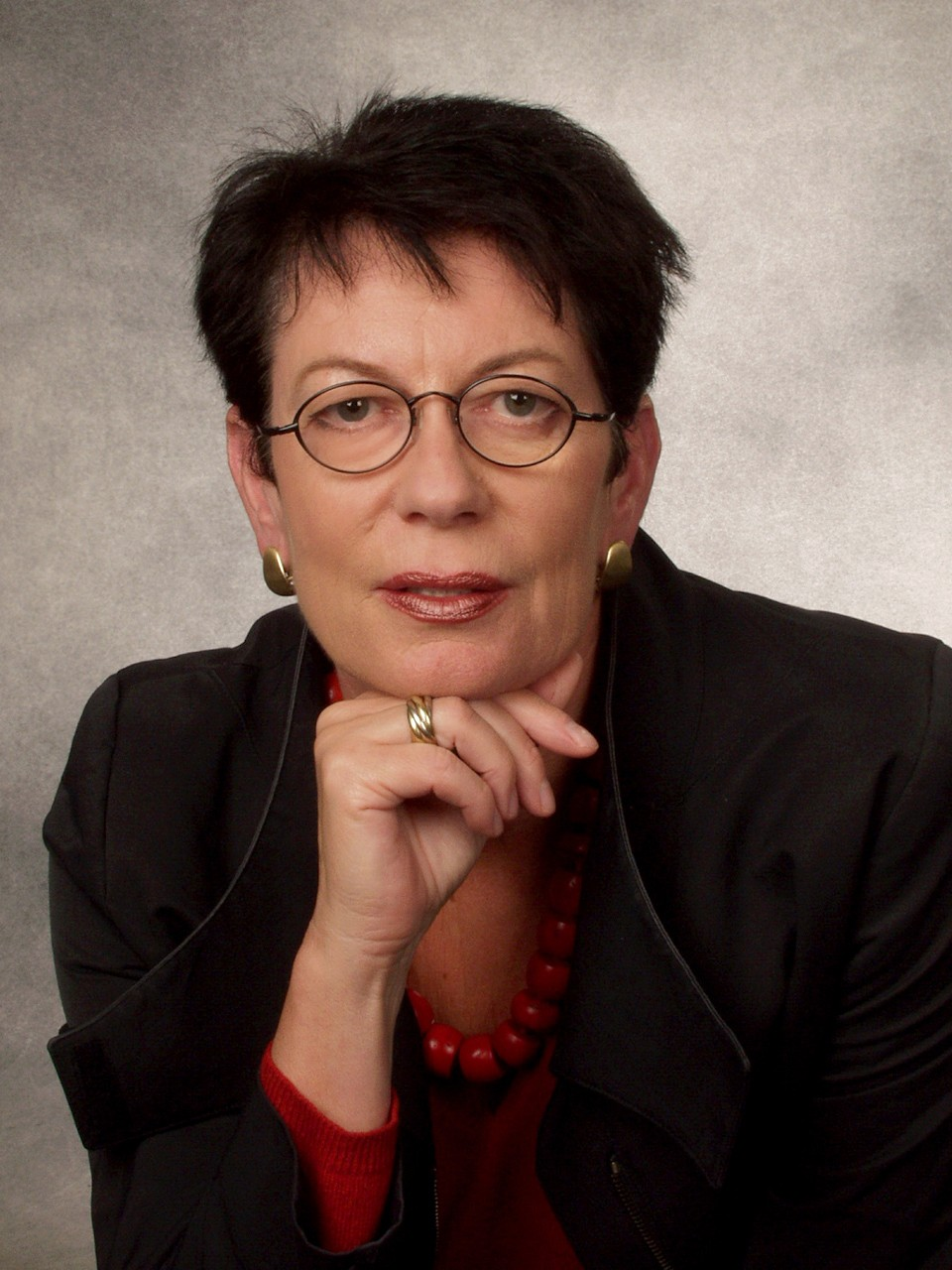
Sibylle Knauss

Sibylle Knauss (born 5 July 1944 in Unna, Germany) is a German writer and academic.

== Biography ==
Knauss studied German, English and Theology in Munich and Heidelberg. Starting in 1970, she worked in a grammar school. Since 1981, Knauss has been working as a freelance writer. For over 20 years she lived and worked in St. Ingbert. Knauss is a professor at the Film Academy Baden-Württemberg (Ludwigsburg) in the field of "screenplay." She is a member of the PEN Center in Germany. Knauss lives in Remseck near Stuttgart.

== Awards and honors ==
Knauss' first work Oh Elise or love is a solitary business was awarded the 1982 prize of the New Literary Society in Hamburg. Her bestseller Evas Cousine was listed in the New York Times "Books of the Year" in 2002.

In July 2006, Knauss was awarded the "Saarland Art Prize (Literature)." The jury stated: "The clear composition of her novels is especially worth mentioning. Her great themes have been thoroughly researched; Sibylle Knauss must be attested to an excellent literary treatment of her subjects. For her novels, she chooses mainly historical figures of women whose ways of life she describes in a particular way. Sibylle Knauss' language is free of ideological ballast, her novels read with pleasure."

Saarland Minister of Culture, Jürgen Schreier, described Knauss as "an outstanding literary ambassador of our country."

Knauss was listed in the list of 50 major Saarlanders by the Landesarbeitsgemeinschaft Kommunale Frauenbeauftrag [Google translation: National Workers' Union Communal Women's Commission] in Saarland.

== Reviews ==
Edelgard Abenstein, Deutschlandradio Kultur: "Knauss' talent is always reflected in the successful combination of facts and fiction, such as in "Eden," where she presents herself as a master of the biographical novel, whose greatest strengths lie in the life of the adventurer Mary Leakey, where style, wit, and color sparkle."

== Selected publications ==
- Oh Elise, or, Loves is a lonely business. Novel. Hoffmann & Campe, Hamburg 1981, ISBN 3-455-03860-3 ( Elise Lensing )
- The master's room. Novel. Hoffmann & Campe, Hamburg 1983
- Erlkönig's daughters. Novel. Hoffmann & Campe, Hamburg 1985
- Charlotte Corday. Novel. Hoffmann & Campe, Hamburg 1988
- Uninvited guests. Novel. Droemer Knaur, Munich 1991 ISBN 3-455-03864-6
- School of narrative - a guide. Fischer TB, Frankfurt 1995 ISBN 3-596-12885-4;
- Over Neuaufl.: School of narrative. A guide for novels and screenplay authors. Authors House, Berlin 2006 ISBN 3-86671-011-9
- The night with Paul. Novel. Droemer Knaur, Munich 1996 ISBN 3-426-65103-3
- The missionary. Novel. Hoffmann & Campe, Hamburg, 1997 ISBN 3-455-03866-2
- Eva's cousin. Novel. Claassen, Munich 2000 ISBN 3-546-00236-9
- Feet in the fire. Novel. Claassen, Hamburg 2003 ISBN 3-546-00288-1
- The Marquise de Sade. Novel. Hoffmann & Campe, Hamburg, 2006, ISBN 3-455-03867-0
- Eden. Novel. Hoffmann & Campe, Hamburg 2009 ISBN 978-3-455-40144-8
- Stranger Novel. Hoffmann & Campe, Hamburg 2012 ISBN 978-3-455-40358-9
- The love memory. Novel. Klöpfer & Meyer, Tübingen, Germany 2015 ISBN 978-3-86351-092-3

== Further information ==
- Helga Abret: In the twilight of distance and proximity. On Sibylle Knauss' novel "Charlotte Corday" (1988). In: Helga Abret, Ilse Nagelschmidt (Hrsg.): Between distance and proximity . A generation of authors in the 80s. (= Convergences 6). Peter Lang, Bern et al., 1998, ISBN 3-906759-98-9, pp. 211-234.
- Katharina Schnell: On Subjectivity in the Reception and Interpretation of Works by the example of the author Sibylle Knauss. Proseminar work. Johannes Gutenberg University, Mainz, Germany.
- Simplice Agossavi: External hermeneutics in contemporary German literature with examples by Uwe Timm, Gerhard Polt, Urs Widmer, Sibylle Knauss, Wolfgang Lange and Hans Christoph Buch (= Saarbrücker Contributions to Literary Sciences, volume 77). Röhrig, St. Ingbert 2003, ISBN 3-86110-339-7 (Dissertation University of the Saarland 2002, Speaker: Gerhard Sauder, 186 pages).
