= Peter Menne =

German painter

Movie Set - Secret Lab of Mr. Dump

Peter Menne (born 1960 in Unna, North Rhine-Westphalia) is a German production designer, stage designer, painter and musician.

== Career ==
Menne studied Fine Arts and Stage Design at the National Academy of Fine Arts in Düsseldorf under Tony Cragg and Luise Kimme. He subsequently travelled and worked in many areas of the world, and had art exhibitions in Germany, Netherlands, Austria, and Australia.

His illustrations were published in "Tempo" and "Playboy" magazine.

He began working in stage design and graphic arts at Hoffmanns Comic Teater in 1976, on a production of Unna. He has since worked on stage design for more than 45 theatre, musical and opera productions around Germany.

== Filmography ==
- 1990: Türmers Traum – Director: diverse, WDR
- 1996: Zwei Tage Grau – Director: Jörg Siepmann – Harry Flöter, Angst Film
- 1997: Hotel – Director: Harry Flöter – Jörg Siepmann, Angst Film
- 1997: Lotto - Dreamboys - Director: Veit Helmer, Markenfilm Hamburg; Commercial
- 1997: Lotto - The Parrot - Director: Veit Helmer, Markenfilm Hamburg; Commercial
- 1998: Silverstar – Director: Jörg Siepmann – Harry Flöter, Flöter Siepmann Film
- 1998: 5 Uhr Schatten – Director: Andreas Wunderlich, September Film
- 1999: L'Amour, l'Argent, l'Amour – Director: Philip Gröning, Gröning Film
- 1999: Pola X – Director: Leos Carax, Pandora Film, Art Director Germany
- 1999: Rembrandt – Director: Charles Matton, Ognon Pictures, Art Director
- 1999: Luckys grosse Abenteuer – Director: Sergei Bodrov, Columbia Pictures. Art Director Germany
- 2000: Wolfsheim – Director: Nicole Weegmann, SWR
- 2001: Die Frau, die an Dr. Fabian zweifelte – Director: Andi Rogenhagen, Lichtblick Film
- 2001: Feuer, Eis & Dosenbier – Director: Mathias Dinter, Goldkind Film
- 2001: Do Fish Do It? – Director: Almut Getto, Icon Film
- 2002: Besser als Schule – Director: Simon Rost, Schokolade Film
- 2002: Sea of Silence – Director: Stijn Coninx, Isabella Films
- 2003: Schwer verknallt – Director: Josh Broecker, Cameo Film
- 2003: Dear Wendy – Director: Thomas Vinterberg, Zentropa, Art Director
- 2004: Rabenkinder – Director: Nicole Weegmann, zero west
- 2004: Tatort – Erfroren – Director: Züli Aladag, Colonia Media Film
- 2005: Emma's Bliss – Director: Sven Taddicken, Wüste Film
- 2005: Rage – Director: Züli Aladag, Colonia Media Filmp
- 2006: Vivere – Director: Angelina Maccarone, Elsani Film
- 2007: The Calling Game – Director: Felix Randau, Wüste Film West
- 2007: Messy Christmas – Director: Vanessa Jopp, X Filme Creative Pool
- 2007: Coxless Pair – Director: Jobst Oetzmann, Lichtblick Film
- 2008: The Murder Farm – Director: Bettina Oberli, Wüste Film, Christiane Krumwiede - Peter Menne
- 2008: 12 Meter ohne Kopf – Director: Sven Taddicken, Wüste Film
- 2010: Alive and Ticking – Director: Andi Rogenhagen, Wüste Film
- 2011: The Rhino and the Dragonfly – Director: Lola Randl, Coin Film
- 2012: 300 Worte Deutsch – Director: Züli Aladag, Sperl Productions
- 2014: Tatort – Schwerelos – Director: Züli Aladag, Geißendörfer Film und Fernsehproduktion
- 2016: NSU German History X: Die Opfer – Vergesst mich nicht – Director: Züli Aladag, Wiedemann & Berg Television
- 2017: Rock my Heart – Director: Hanno Olderdissen, Neue Schönhauser Filmproduktion
- 2018: Harter Brocken – Der Geheimcode – Director: Markus Sehr, H&V Entertainment
- 2019: Irish Crime Scene - Forgiveness – Director: Züli Aladag, Good friends Filmproduction
- 2019: Irish Crime Scene - Samhain, The Night of the Dead – Director: Züli Aladag, Good friends Filmproduction

== Stage Design ( Selection ) ==
- 1997: Das Tor zum Paradies, by Peter Möbius – Stadttheater Unna; Director: Tony Glaser
- 1996: Nach dem Mittag, byKarst Woudstra - Theater Fletch Bizzel Dortmund; Director: Hans Peter Krüger
- 1995: Unser Faust I und II, based on Johann Wolfgang von Goethe – Theater Fletch Bizzel; Director: Helmut Palitsch
- 1995: Die Braut der Brüder, by Peter Möbius – Alte Synagoge Essen (Uraufführung); Director: Tony Glaser, Music: Rio Reiser
- 1994: Eine Mittsommernachts-Sexkomödie, by Woody Allen; Director: Helmut Palitsch
- 1994: Jephtha, by Georg Friedrich Händel; Director: Udo van Ooyen
- 1993: Die Kinder von Nr. 67, based on Lisa Tetzner – Stadthalle Unna; Director: Edzard Krückeberg
- 1993: Ermione, by Gioachino Rossini – Rossini-Festival Putbus (Spielstätte Marstall); Director: Helmut Palitsch
- 1992: Auslaufmodelle, by Mamma Grappa; Director: Helmut Palitsch
- 1992: Offene Zweierbeziehung, by Dario Fo und Franca Rame; Director: Helmut Palitsch
- 1992: Fallen, Fälle, Zwischenfälle, by Daniil Charms; Director: Helmut Palitsch
- 1991: Heinrich V, by William Shakespeare – Kampnagel Hamburg; Director: Kees Campfens
- 1990: Caveman, by Rob Becker – Klexs Theater Hamburg; Director: Helmut Palitsch
- 1989: Das Wasser des Lebens, Unnas Stadtoper - by Peter Möbius; Director: Peter Möbius, Music: Rio Reiser
- 1989: Der Bürgergeneral, by Johann Wolfgang von Goethe; Director: Helmut Palitsch
- 1988: Der Ozeanflug, by Bertolt Brecht – Klexs Theater Hamburg; Director: Helmut Palitsch
- 1985: Freispiel, by Enke / Richter – Landestheater Tübingen (LTT); Director: Peter Möbius, Music: Rio Reiser
- 1981: Märzstürme 1920, – Hoffmanns Comic Teater (Ruhrgebiet, Zelt-Tournee); Director: Peter Möbius, Music: Rio Reiser
