= Reinhold Sendker =

German politician

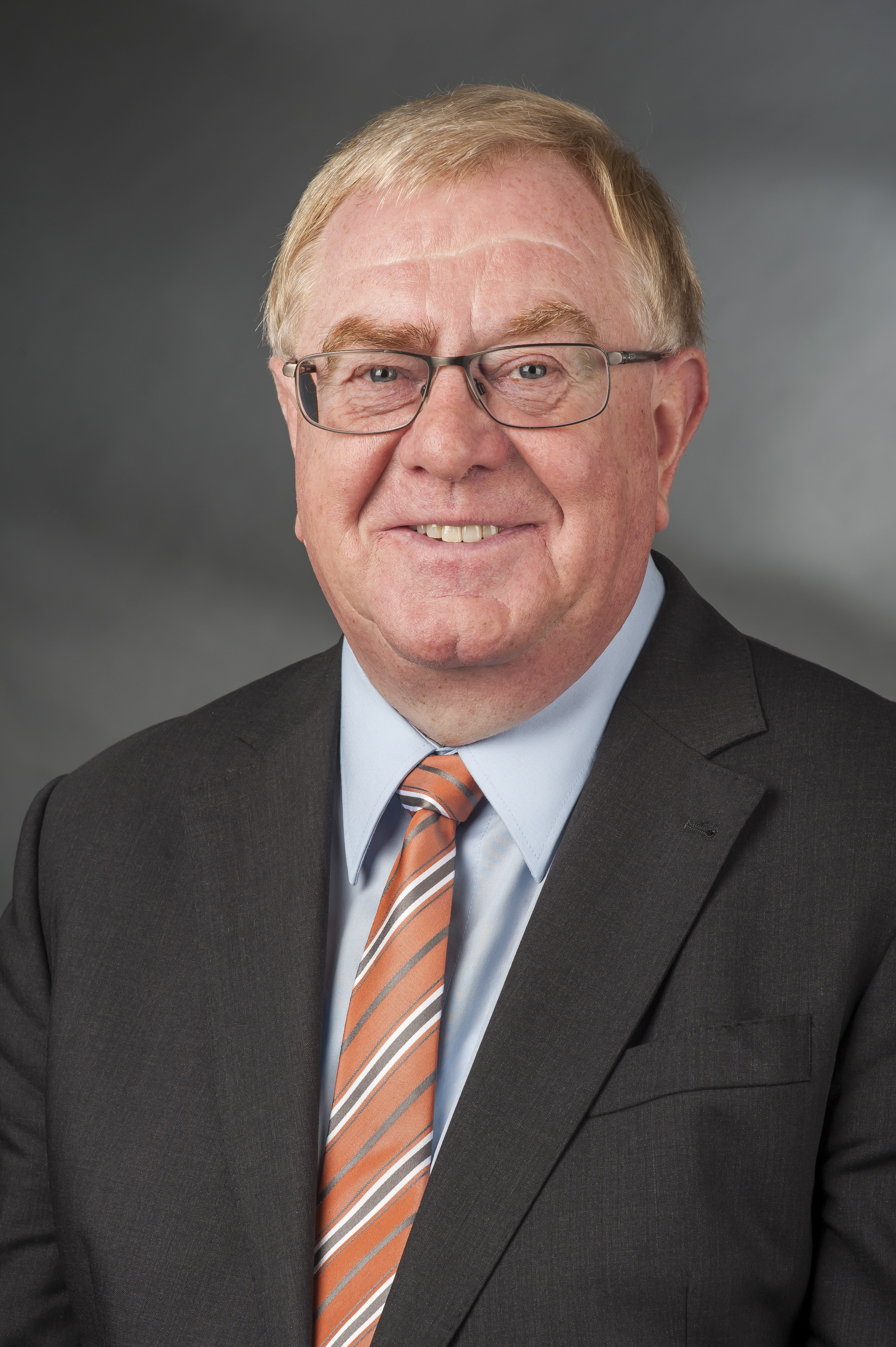
- Sendker in 2014

Member of the Bundestag
- Incumbent
- Assumed office 2009

Personal details
- Born: 24 October 1952 (age 73) Warendorf, West Germany (now Germany)
- Party: CDU

Reinhold Sendker (born 24 October 1952) is a German politician of the Christian Democratic Union (CDU) who has been serving as a member of the Bundestag from the state of North Rhine-Westphalia since 2009.

== Political career ==
Sendke became a member of the Bundestag in the 2009 German federal election. He is a member of the Committee on Transport and Digital Infrastructure.

== Other activities ==
- Federal Network Agency for Electricity, Gas, Telecommunications, Posts and Railway (BNetzA), Alternate Member of the Rail Infrastructure Advisory Council
