= Inge Donnepp =

German politician

Inge Donnepp (13 December 1918 – 31 July 2002) was a German lawyer and politician (SPD). She was the first woman minister of Justice of a German state. Because of her political commitment, she was called in the SPD also "mother Courage of the Ruhr area".

== Early life and education ==
Donnepp was born in Unna. She studied New Philology at the University of Heidelberg. She attended law school at Rostock and Berlin, receiving her degree in 1947. She worked as a lawyer from 1947 until 1954. She became a judge at the end of 1954, at the social courts of Münster and Gelsenkirchen.

== Death ==
She died in Recklinghausen.
