= Der schwarze Kanal =

East German television series of political propaganda programmes (1960–1989)

- Logo
- Presented by: Karl-Eduard von Schnitzler
- Country of origin: East Germany
- Original language: German
- No. of episodes: 1,519

Production
- Running time: 20 minutes

Original release
- Network: DFF
- Release: 21 March 1960 – 30 October 1989

Intro to Der schwarze Kanal, last edition 30 October 1989.

Der schwarze Kanal (English: The Black Channel) was a series of polemical talk shows hosted by Karl-Eduard von Schnitzler that aired weekly between 1960 and 1989, on the East German state television broadcaster DFF. Each edition was made up of recorded extracts from recent West German television programmes re-edited to include a communist commentary.

The 20-minute programme was usually scheduled for transmission at around 21:30 CET on Monday evenings (which repeated again on Tuesday mornings at 11:30), before or after some popular item in the hope that viewers tuning in early to catch the film would see the programme. According to some sources, official surveys gave a 5% audience figure.

The title sequence featured an eagle (symbol of the Federal Republic) with a black, white and red chest band representing their flag of the German Empire during the pre-World War I era, while the antennas also featured a parody of the ARD's Tagesschau title sequence between 1956 and 1973.

== History ==
The programme was hosted by Karl-Eduard von Schnitzler and began on 21 March 1960. The name "Black Channel" is a play on words; in the German language "black channel" is a euphemism by plumbers for a sewer (compare English soil pipe). The name and the concept of the programme were originally a reaction to a contemporaneous West German programme named Die rote Optik ("The Red Viewpoint") authored by journalist Thilo Koch, which analyzed East German television clips. Although the programme was primarily intended for domestic consumption, as the makers (at least in the early days) hoped that those in the West who could receive DFF would also watch. The tones of his speech were described as polemical and aggressive by the Institute of Philology of LMU Munich.

Terrestrial penetration of West German TV reception (red) in East Germany for ARD first channel

The geography of divided Germany meant that West German television signals (particularly ARD) could be received fairly readily in most of East Germany. Areas with no reception (black) such as parts of Eastern Saxony around Dresden were jokingly referred to as "Valley of the Clueless" (Tal der Ahnungslosen), showing acronyms ZDF and ARD accounted for Zentrales Deutsches Fernsehen Außer Rügen und Dresden (Central German TV except Rügen and Dresden). Whilst radio signals from international broadcasters like the BBC and the American-backed local station RIAS in West Berlin could be jammed, it was diplomatically and technically awkward to block West German television as it would have been impossible to do so (with any degree of effectiveness) without affecting reception in parts of West Germany as well which (apart from being outlawed by treaty) in turn could have prompted the West Germans to retaliate against Eastern broadcasts.

The solution as seen by DFF, was to record items from the ARD and ZDF that were unwelcome in the East or provided a different spin on a news story and replay the items on the main DFF1 channel with a commentary "explaining" what was really "meant" by the item, or how the item was "untrue" or "flawed".

The programme ceased broadcasting on 30 October 1989, just ahead of the opening of the borders with the west on 9 November, when the East German television service declared itself "free of government interference" before it merged less than a year later with its formerly-rival West German television networks as a result of reunification. In 1992, ORB broadcast a last edition made at the end of 1991, with additional new comments himself by Schnitzler. On 9 November 2009, ZDF broadcast the mockumentary Der schwarze Kanal kehrt zurück ("The Black Channel Returns"), which parodies Schnitzler's manipulative handling of archive material.

== Concept ==
Other representatives of the programme included Günter Herlt (26 editions), Ulrich Makosch (19 editions) and Heinz Grote (144 editions) who instead employed a less aggressive tone, as well as various speakers like Götz Förster (four editions), Volker Ott and Albert Reisz (both two editions) who only commented on some data.

== Reception ==
Schnitzler originally worked at NWDR and was one of the best-known commentators in the East German media. He was often respectfully ambivalently referred to "Karl-Eduard", and humorously as "Karl-Eduard von Schni–", suggesting that viewers would either change the channel or turn the TV off before he could finish speaking his name in the introduction. Furthermore, the singer-songwriter Wolf Biermann railed against Schnitzler on 1 December 1989 in his Ballade von den verdorbenen Greisen ("Ballad of the Corrupt Old Men"), giving him the nickname "Sudel-Ede" (roughly "Dirty Eddie") and saying that he would "even lie to the worms in his grave".

Especially in the 1960s and early 1970s, the programme was sometimes regarded as a kind of mandatory viewing in some industries. For example, the content of Der schwarze Kanal was used in army political education (Nationale Volksarmee or Grenztruppen) and at discretion in civics lessons in schools.

The German Broadcasting Archive accused Schnitzler of manipulating the statements through significant cuts in scenes and re-editing of footage.

== Availability ==
Title graphic for the programme

According to the German Broadcasting Archive, the custodian of the East German television archives, GDR television only recorded the clips presented in magazine programmes like Der schwarze Kanal, not live commentaries and introductions by the moderators. In the case of Der schwarze Kanal specifically, neither Schnitzler's commentary nor the original West German television clips themselves survived because Schnitzler usually had them destroyed shortly after being broadcast. However, the scripts from which Schnitzler gave his commentary have been largely preserved and are available on the German Broadcasting Archive's website.

The episodes surviving today—around 350 of the total 1,519 aired—were recorded by West German institutions during their live broadcast on East German television and are now in the possession of the archive. In addition, 33 editions of Der schwarze Kanal are commercially available in a 6-DVD box set released on 27 October 2016 with a total of twelve hours.

In 2004, the daily newspaper Junge Welt has used the title "Schwarzer Kanal" for a weekly column, which also been produced as a video and podcast since 2019. In 2011, the conservative journalist Jan Fleischhauer adopted the name for his online column in Der Spiegel.

The programme was featured in the 1999 movie Sonnenallee and the 2019 TV series Deutschland 86.

== See also ==
- Aktuelle Kamera
- Ossi and Wessi
- Eastern Bloc media and propaganda
