= Angelika Unterlauf =

German journalist

- Born: 1946 (age 79–80); Gröningen, Saxony-Anhalt, Allied-occupied Germany
- Known for: "face of the GDR"

Angelika Unterlauf (born 1946) is a German television journalist. As the anchor of the main GDR television news programme, Aktuelle Kamera, she was regarded as the "face of the GDR" until German reunification.

== Life ==
In 1977, Angelika Unterlauf, a trained architectural draftswoman, made her debut as a newsreader in the studios of Aktuelle Kamera. However, she had already gained experience as a presenter on radio from 1969, for example on Notenbude, a rock music programme of the Stimme der DDR radio station. In 1985, she was voted "TV favourite of the year" by the readers of the GDR TV magazine FF dabei.

Unterlauf joined the SED in 1987, and left in 1989.

On July 2, 1990, Angelika Unterlauf presented the news in DFF's AK am Abend for the last time and was dismissed in 1991. Afterwards she worked as a narrator for Spiegel TV. She has been a full-time editor at Sat.1 since 1993.

Even before 1989 she became famous in the Federal Republic of Germany when singer Lonnie (aka: former RIAS employee Klaus Heilbronner) dedicated the song Angelika vom Fernsehen in der DDR to her. It took several months for Unterlauf to refute the Stasi's accusations that she maintained a relationship with Heilbronner.

On 17 August 2004 she married journalist and TV presenter Erich Böhme. The couple lived in a former manor house on the lake in Worin from May 2006. Angelika Unterlauf has two daughters and has been a widow since 27 November 2009.
