= Ochsenkopf Transmitter =

Transmitter important in bringing West German TV to East Germany

Coordinates: 50°01′50″N 11°48′29″E

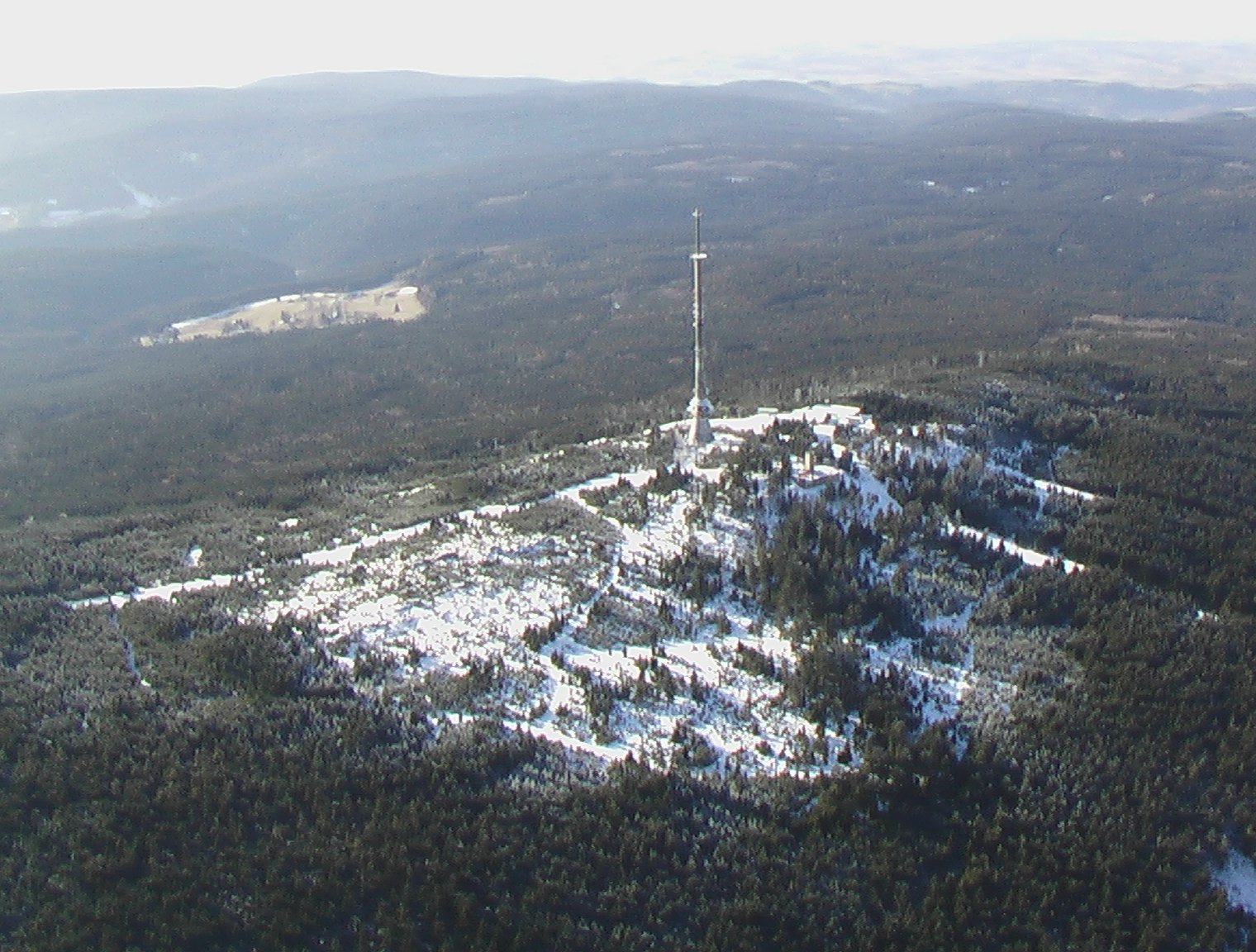
Aerial view of Ochsenkopf TV Tower

The Ochsenkopf Transmitter (German: Sender Ochsenkopf) is a 163-metre (535 ft) radio and TV tower of reinforced concrete, which was built in 1958 on the summit of the 1,024-metre (3,360 ft) Ochsenkopf mountain, the second-highest mountain in the Fichtel Mountains in Northern Bavaria, Germany. The tower replaced a 50-metre (160 ft) guyed steel tube TV mast that collapsed in January 1958 as result of icing. The tower, which is not accessible to the public, has a hyperbolic-shaped basement with five floors for technical equipment. Above it, there are platforms for directional antennas. The antennas for FM-transmission are on the upper part of the concrete tower, those for TV transmission on a steel tube mast on the top.

== Transmitting to the former GDR ==
Penetration of West German TV reception (red) in East Germany for channel ARD. Areas with no reception (dark grey) were jokingly referred to as "Valley of the Clueless" (Tal der Ahnungslosen).

Ochsenkopf TV Tower played an important role in transmitting to the former GDR many West German FM and TV programs, notably ARD, West Germany's first – and between 1952 and 1963 only – television channel. Its signal could penetrate deep into the southern territory of East Germany due to its closeness to the border, its use of a low frequency (VHF Band I channel 4), and of vertical polarization. Under good conditions, its signal could be received as far away as Görlitz on the East German-Polish border, even though most aerials there were pointed at the West Berlin transmitters.

The transmitter required large and specifically mounted aerials nicknamed Ochsenkopf-Antenne, or Ochsenkopf for short, thus making the homes of viewers of western television easily recognizable. A campaign in the early 1960s by East Germany's state youth organisation FDJ aimed at turning away or removing such aerials exploited this fact.

== Similar towers ==
Many other TV towers of similar design were built after 1958 in Germany and other European countries, including:

- Święty Krzyż TV Tower in Poland
- Brotjacklriegel TV Tower in Germany
- Donnersberg TV Tower in Germany
- Ještěd Tower in Czech Republic
- Schladming TV Tower, Austria
- Kitzbüheler Horn transmitter, Austria
- Mugel TV Tower, Austria
- Slanchev Bryag TV Tower, Bulgaria
- Stramni Rid TV Tower, Bulgaria
- Ostankino Tower in Moscow, Russia

== Transmitted Programs ==
=== FM Radio ===
Program	Frequency	ERP
Bayern 1	90.7 MHz	100 kW
Bayern 1	91.2 MHz	20 kW
Bayern 2 Radio	96.0 MHz	100 kW
Bayern 3	99.4 MHz	100 kW
DLF	100.3 MHz	100 kW
Bayern 4 Klassik	102.3 MHz	100 kW
Antenne Bayern	103.2 MHz	100 kW
B5 Aktuell	107.1 MHz	100 kW

=== Television (digital, DVB-T standard) ===
Launched on November 25, 2008.

Channel	Frequency [MHz]	Multiplex	Programs in Multiplex	ERP [kW]	Antenna Type	Polarization horizontal (H) / vertical (V)	Modulation	FEC	Guard Interval	Bit Rate [MBit/s]
E23	490	ZDFmobil-Bouquet	ZDF; 3sat; KI.KA (6 AM - 9 PM) ZDFneo (9 PM - 6 AM, since November 1, 2009) ZDFdokukanal (9 PM - 6 AM, until October 21, 2009); ZDFinfokanal	50	omni	H	16-QAM	2/3	1/4	13.47
E29	538	ARD Bouquet	Das Erste (BR Nord); arte; Phoenix; EinsPlus	100	omni	H	16-QAM	2/3	1/4	13.47
E40	626	BR-Bouquet	Bayerisches Fernsehen (Franconia); BR-alpha; MDR Fernsehen (Thuringia); hr-fernsehen	100	omni	H	16-QAM	2/3	1/4	13.47

== Former Programs ==
=== Television (analogue, PAL standard) ===
Shut down on November 30, 2008.

Program	Frequency	ERP
ARD (BRF region)	Ch E4 vertical	50 kW (used to be 100 kW)

The public channels ZDF and Bayerisches Fernsehen for the region were previously transmitted from the nearby mountain Großer Waldstein.

== See also ==
- List of towers
