= Hans-Dieter Lange =

- Born: 20 June 1926; Elbing, East Prussia, Germany
- Died: 18 May 2012 (aged 85); Berlin, Germany
- Occupation: Journalist

Hans-Dieter Lange (20 June 1926 – 18 May 2012) was a German TV journalist and anchorman of the East German newscast Aktuelle Kamera.

== Biography ==
Lange was born in Elbing (Elbląg), Germany. After passing his Abitur he started to attend the stage school in Danzig. In 1944, he was drafted to the Wehrmacht and became a Canadian prisoner of war in 1945. Until 1946 he was deployed as an ambulanceman for the UNRRA at Bergen-Belsen DP camp. Lange worked as an actor at the theaters of Hildesheim and Bonn and started to work for the East German radio in 1950 and the East German TV station in 1963. Until 1990, he presented the main newscast Aktuelle Kamera.
