= Tal der Ahnungslosen =

Sarcastic designation of regions in East Germany

Penetration of ARD's Erstes Deutsches Fernsehen (grey) in East Germany. Areas with no reception (black) were jokingly referred to as "Valley of the Clueless" (Tal der Ahnungslosen), while ARD was said to stand for "Außer (except) Rügen und Dresden"

Tal der Ahnungslosen (Valley of the Clueless) was a sarcastic designation for two regions in the southeast and northeast of East Germany (GDR) that were generally unable to receive television broadcasts from West Germany (FRG) from the mid to late 1950s until early 1990, shortly before German reunification. These broadcasts included the West German public broadcasters ARD and ZDF.

== Overview ==
After the reestablishment of broadcasting in Germany, West German broadcasters took measures to cover as much of East Germany as possible, building high-powered transmitter sites on the highest ground possible near the border (as well as in West Berlin) and placing ARD on the VHF Band I channels which carried the farthest. Notable in this regard was the transmitter on Ochsenkopf in Bavaria, which covered much of southern East Germany with ARD on VHF channel E4 (61–68 MHz), but required the use of large and conspicuous antennas nicknamed Ochsenkopfantenne for reception. Though the East German government would have preferred to prevent its citizens from viewing West German media, jamming the West German broadcasts within East Germany would have been diplomatically difficult; as a technical matter, this jamming could not be accomplished without affecting reception within West Germany itself, and in any case it was prohibited by treaty.

Accordingly, viewing West German television became common practice in most of East Germany, the main exception being the regions that were too far from the West German transmitters to receive a signal. West German television stations were widely regarded as more up-to-date and reliable in their coverage than their East German counterpart, Fernsehen der DDR. As a result, people who could not receive those stations were considered less well-informed about contemporary events in their country and the wider world, even though they still had access to some international radio. East Germans therefore jokingly used the abbreviation ARD to stand for Außer Rügen und Dresden (except Rügen and Dresden), since the programmes could be viewed in almost all other parts of East Germany, such as Erfurt, Leipzig, Magdeburg, Rostock, and Schwerin.

=== Response ===
The East German government was well aware that its citizens were watching West German public broadcasters and could do little to prevent it, as the practice was widespread. In response, it produced programmes such as Der schwarze Kanal and Aktuelle Kamera that sought to parody and ridicule West German broadcasts by "explaining" what was supposedly "really meant" by the content, or by claiming that the items were "false" or "flawed".

Tony Judt noted that by the mid-1980s the East German government even ran a cable from the West German border to the Dresden area, in what he described as "the wishful belief that if East Germans could watch West German television at home they would not feel the need to emigrate". However, a 2009 study of the opened Stasi documents revealed that dissatisfaction with the regime was recorded higher in the "Valley of the Clueless". A later reanalysis of the same data argued that this stabilising effect does not extend to the committed viewers who sought out Western television wherever they lived; for that group, the reanalysis found, exposure to West German television reduced rather than increased support for the regime.

Effects of these media exposure differences have been found to last a decade after German reunification, with those not exposed to Western television broadcasts less inclined to believe that effort rather than luck determines success in life.

== See also ==
- Deutscher Fernsehfunk
- Der schwarze Kanal
- Ochsenkopf Transmitter
- Culture of East Germany
