= Prisma (German TV programme) =

East German television series (1963–1991)

- Title screen
- Genre: News magazine
- Presented by: See Hosts below
- Country of origin: East Germany
- Original language: German

Production
- Running time: 30–40 minutes

Original release
- Network: DFF
- Release: March 1963 – December 1991

Prisma, subtitled Probleme – Projekte – Personen (English: Problems – Projects – People), was a current affairs television programme that aired on East German state broadcaster DFF.

== Premise ==
Conceived by journalist Gerhard Scheumann, Prisma was first broadcast in March 1963. It aired usually every two weeks, though ended shortly after German reunification in December 1991.

The show was unique in that it identified and discussed everyday problems in East Germany, such as shortages and bureaucracy, though it did not question the foundations of the socialist system itself. Prisma received a large amount of mail from East Germans writing in to discuss their concerns.

Because Gerhard Scheumann felt that "the information system appeared too politically restricted," the creator of the television series withdrew from television work after its broadcast on September 30, 1965. That same year, he wrote a "Prisma Testament" criticizing the state's media policy. It was intended to serve as a basis for cultural policy discussions at the 11th Plenum of the SED Central Committee . However, at this meeting, also known as the "Clear-Cut Plenum" due to its serious consequences for the cultural policy and landscape of the GDR, the document was ignored.

== Hosts ==
- Gerhard Scheumann (1963–1965)
- Karl-Heinz Gerstner (1965–1978)
- Hans Jacobus (1965–1966)
- Axel Kaspar (1968–1991)
- Rosemarie Rosi Ebner (1972–1990)
- Claudia Berlin (1990–1991)
