= Kitzbüheler Horn =

Mountain in the Kitzbühel Alps in Tyrol, Austria

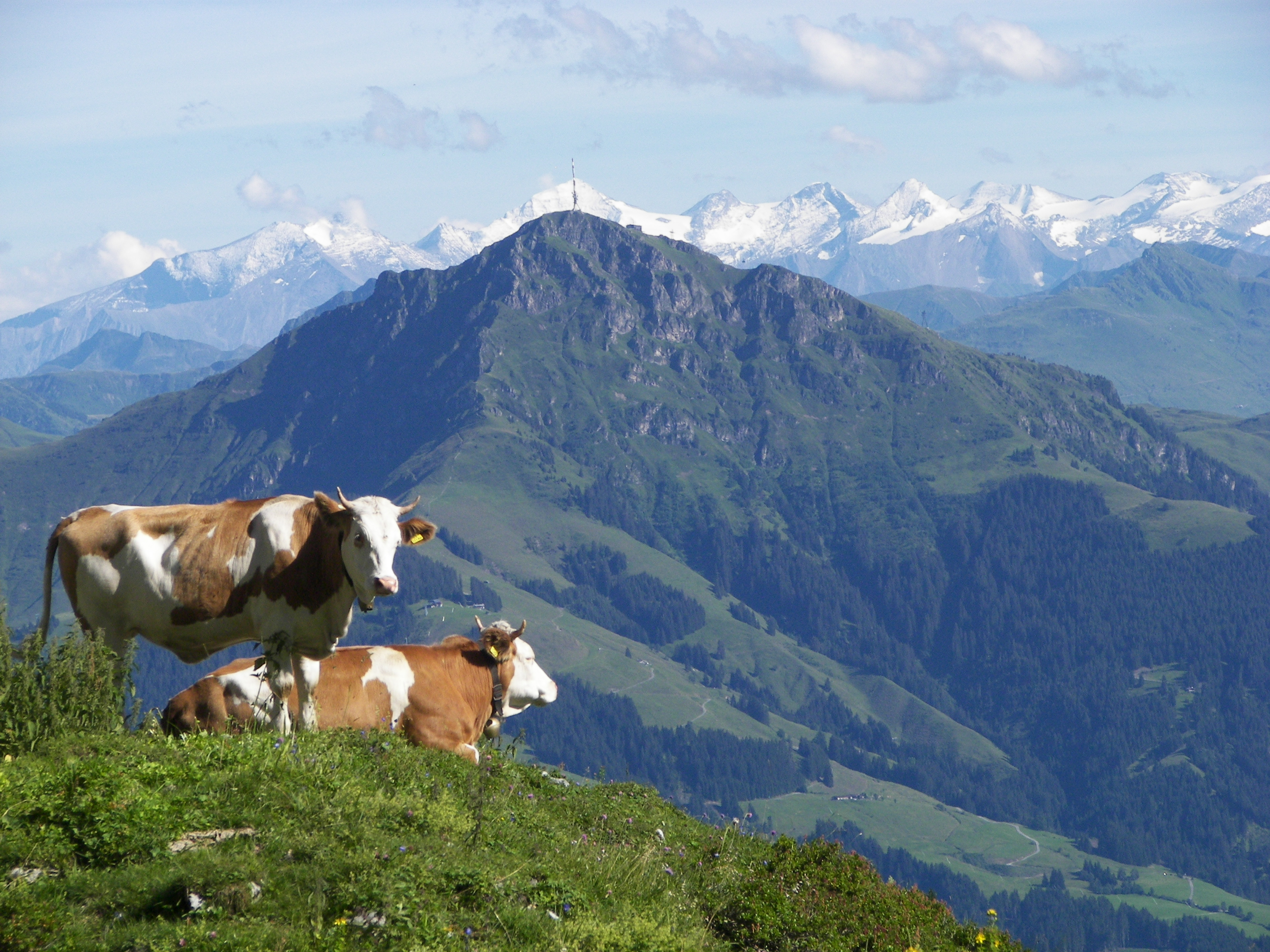
- View of the Kitzbüheler Horn from the Hochgrubach cirque on the Wilder Kaiser

Highest point
- Elevation: 1,996 m (6,549 ft)
- Coordinates: 47°28′36″N 12°25′51″E

Geography
- Location within Austria
- Location: Tyrol, Austria
- Parent range: Kitzbühel Alps

The Kitzbüheler Horn (also spelt Kitzbühler Horn) is a mountain in the Kitzbühel Alps in Tyrol, Austria, whose western flank lies near the smart ski resort of Kitzbühel. It is one of the most prominent mountains in the Kitzbühel Alps in Tyrol. With a height of 1,996 m (AA) it only just misses being a 'two-thousander'.

At the summit is a 102 metre high TV tower belonging to the ORF and known as the Kitzbüheler Horn Transmission Tower (Sendeturm Kitzbüheler Horn). The Harschbichl (1,604 m) is a sub-peak to the north which is also accessible.

== Tourism ==
The mountain has several cable cars and gondola lifts and there is a panoramic toll road from Kitzbühel. There are also several mountain inns on its slopes. The so-called Alpenhaus (1,670 m (AA), 47°28′01″N 12°25′45″E) was in recent years the finish of the King Stage (Königsetappe) of the Tour of Austria cycle race. An Alpine flower garden (Alpenblumengarten) has been laid out at a height of 1800 m which, despite its name, has mountain plants from all over the world. Every year in August the International Kitzbühler Horn Race takes place. The route runs along the 7.4 km long toll road to the Alpenhaus. Its maximum incline in the closing stages is 22.4%. The record time to the Alpenhaus is held by Beat Bräu who completed the race in a time of 29:11 minutes.

Numerous lifts have been built to support winter sports in the ski region of the same name. On the side facing St. Johann there is a mountain cart route. There is a small mountain lake level with the half-way station on the cable car from the village. Both peaks are heavily frequented, not just by hikers, but also by mountain bikers due to its good paths.

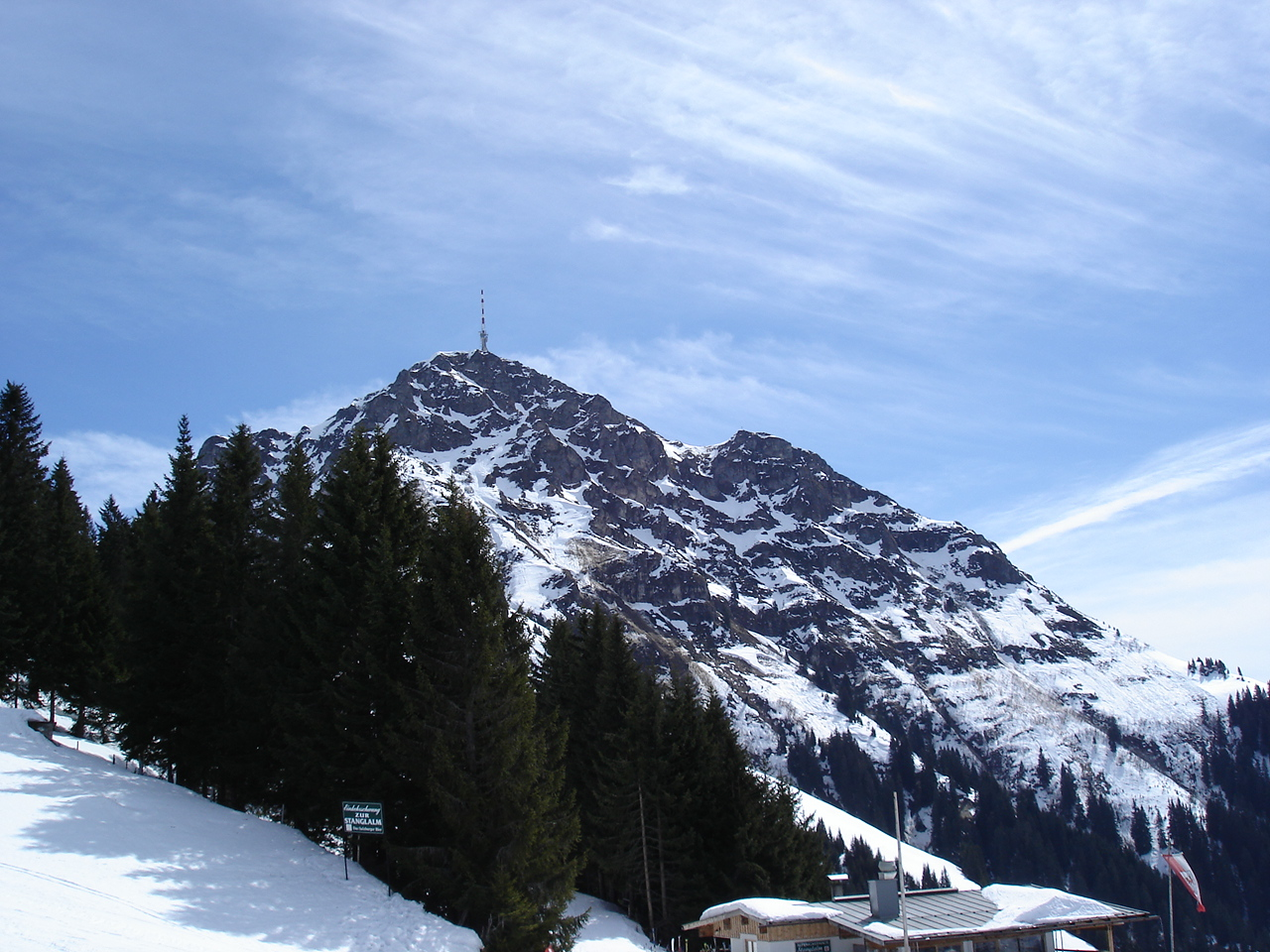
The Kitzbüheler Horn from the north

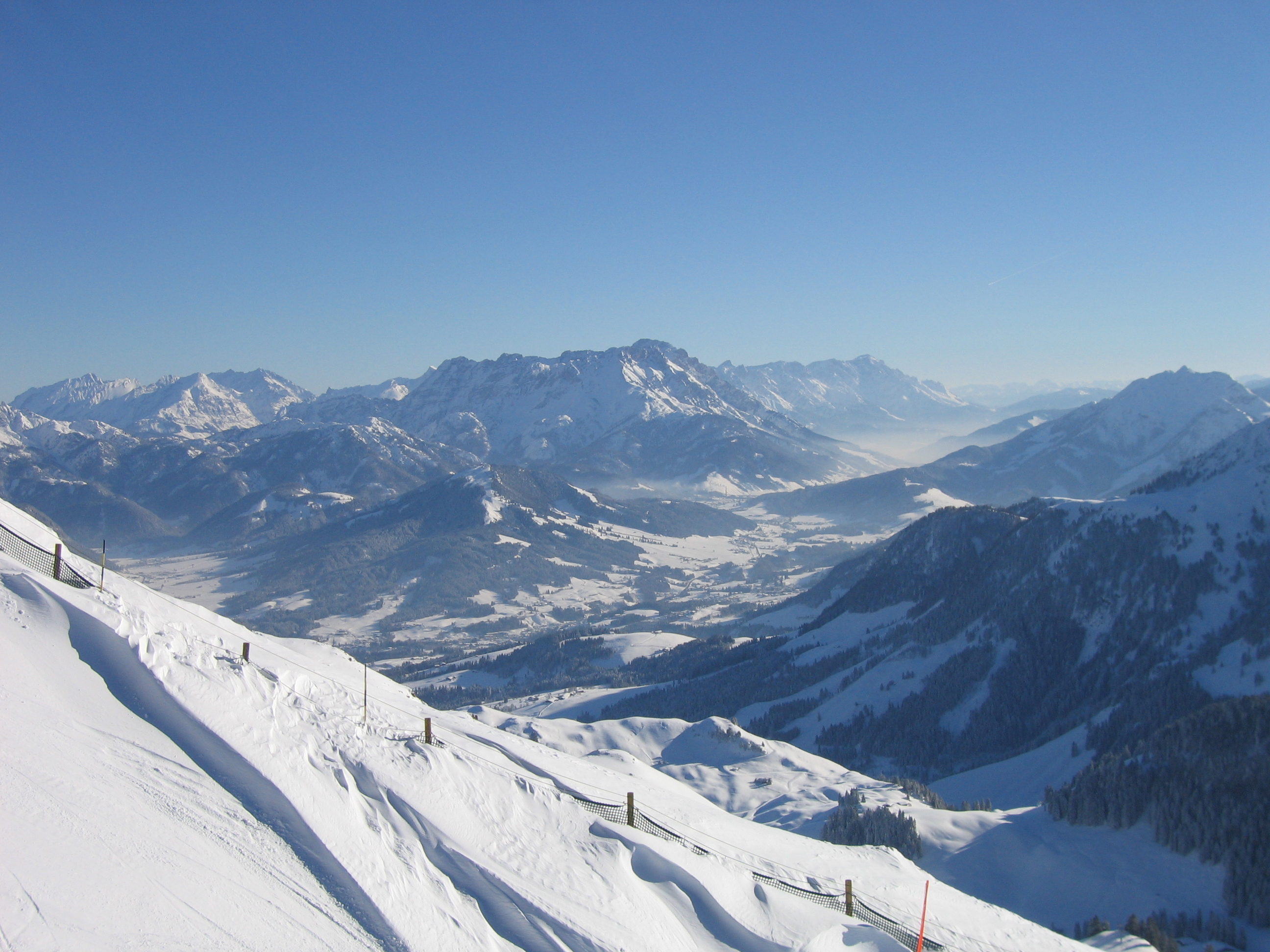
View looking northeast from the Kitzbüheler Horn

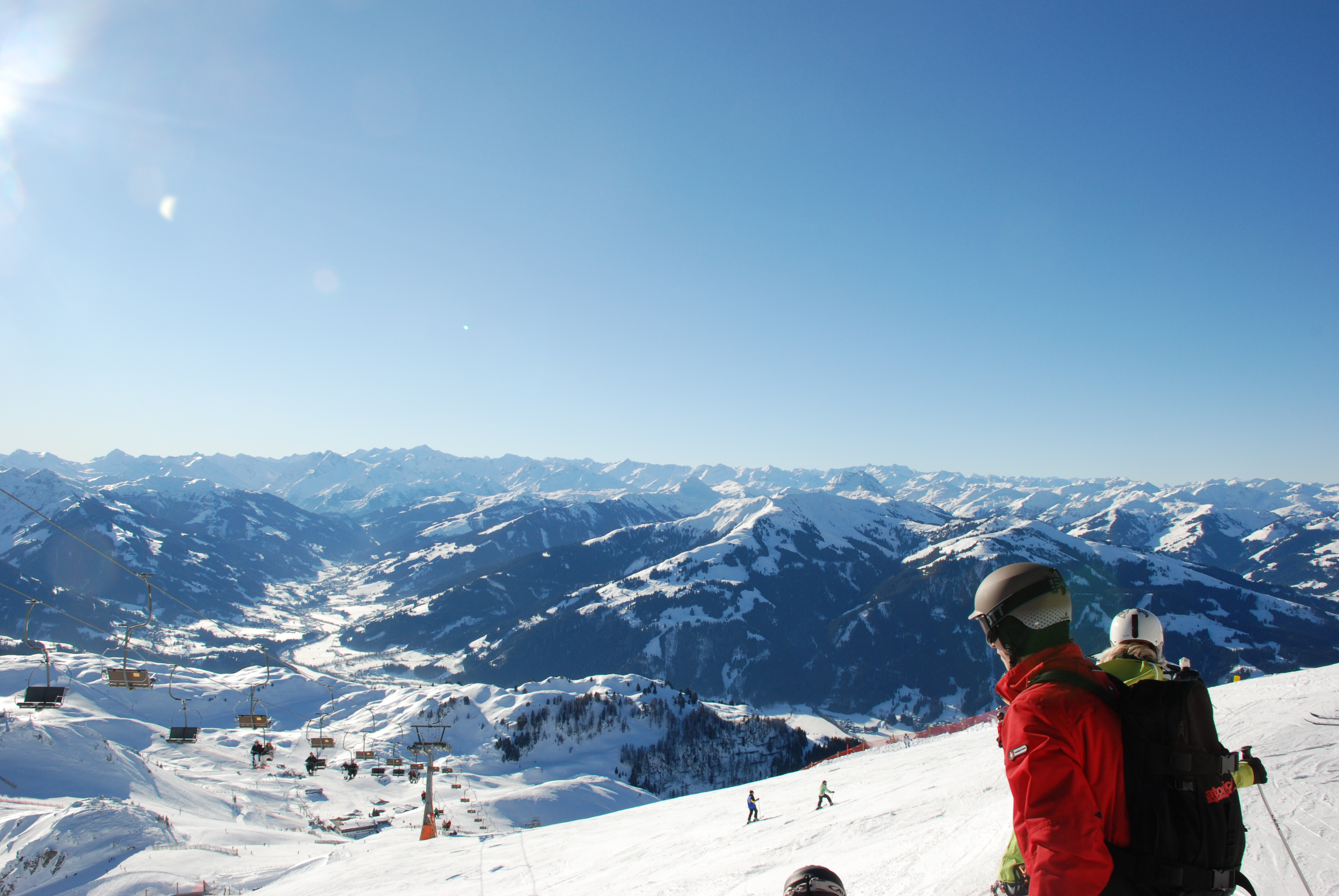
View looking south from the Kitzbüheler Horn

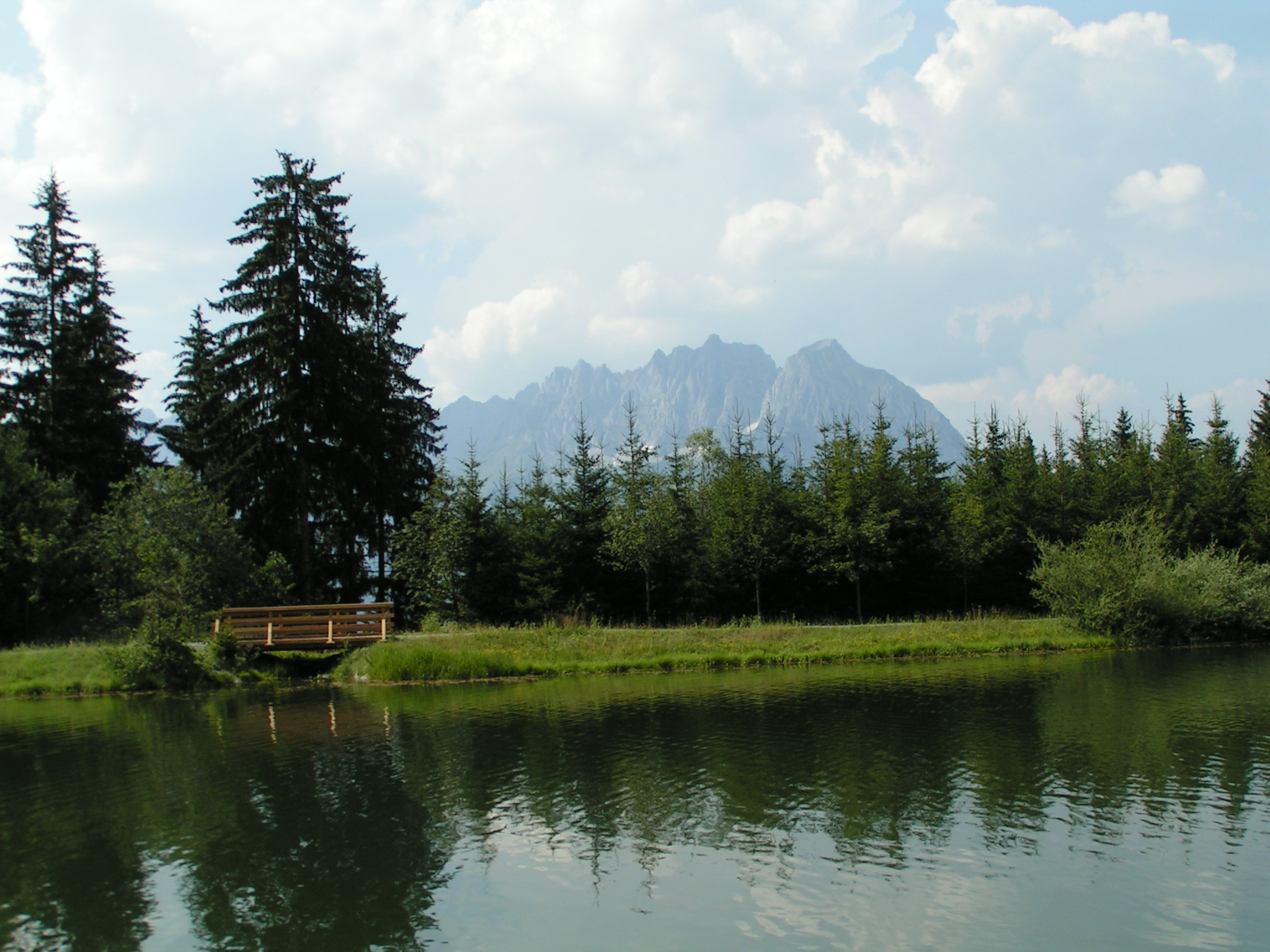
Mountain lake near the halfway station with a view of the Wilder Kaiser range

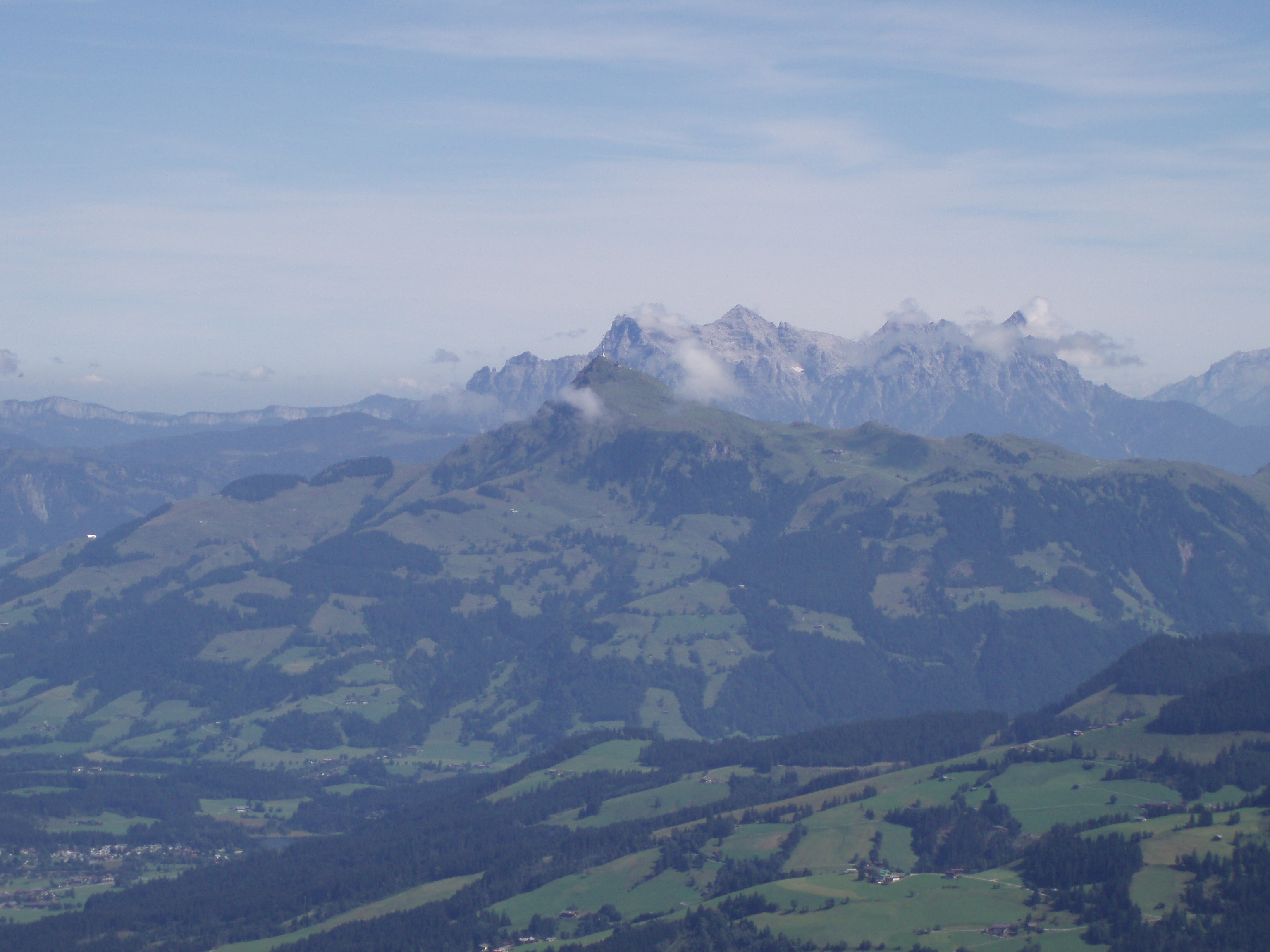
The Kitzbüheler Horn seen from the Gampenkogel, in the background the Loferer Steinberge range

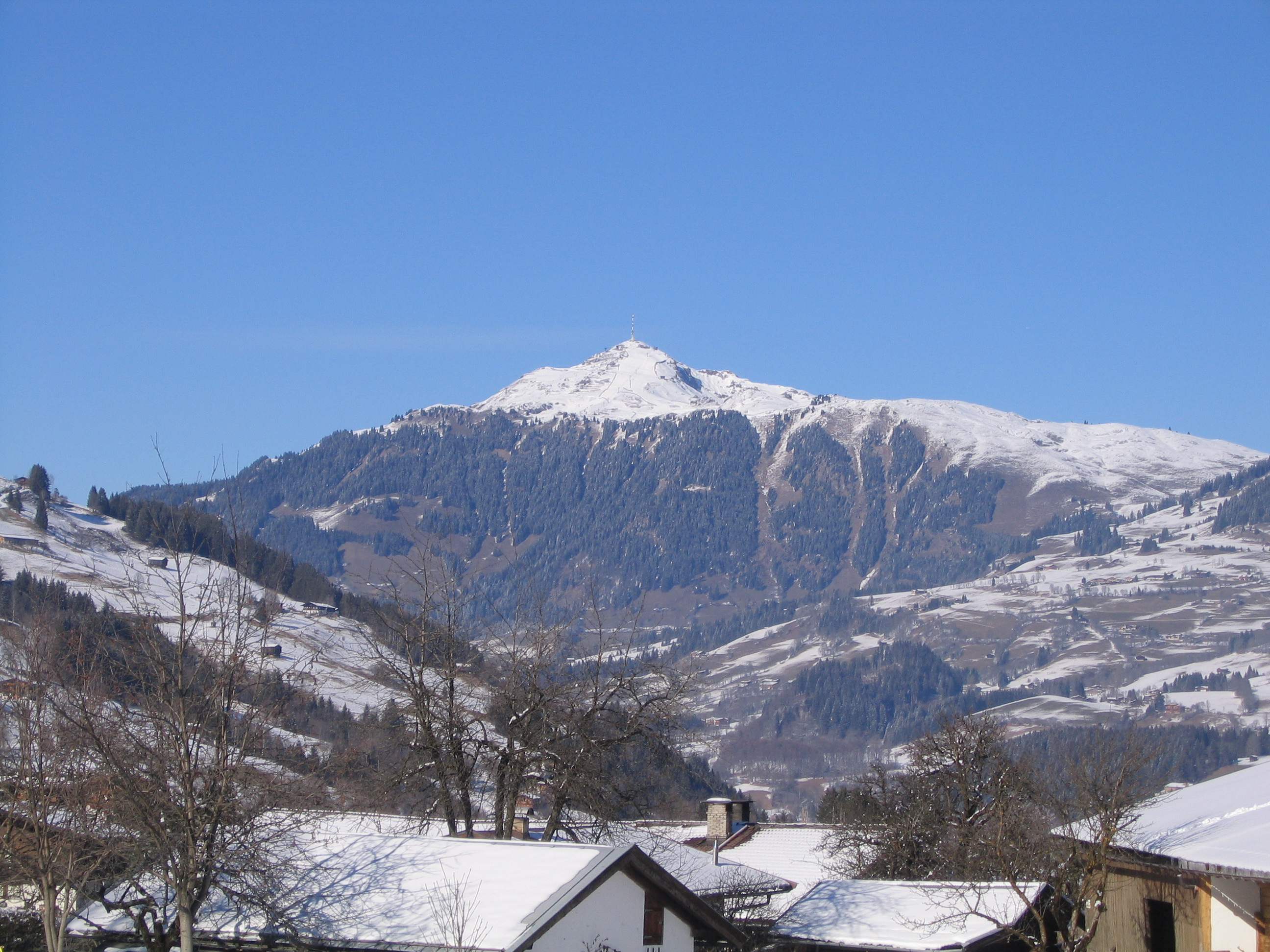
The Kitzbüheler Horn seen from Jochberg to the south.
