= Berlin-Britz transmitter =

Coordinates: 52°26′54″N 13°25′52″E

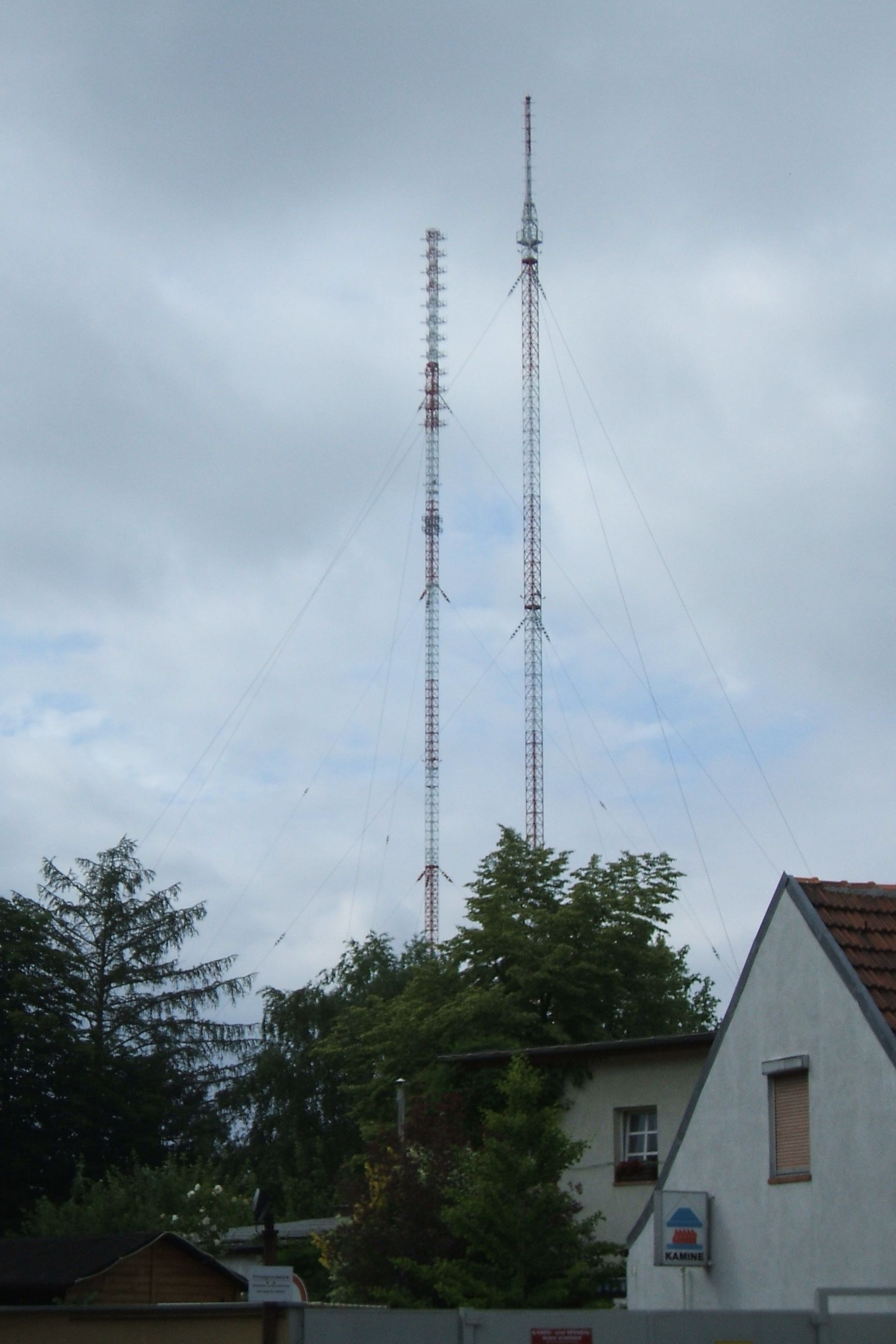
Berlin-Britz transmitter.

Transmitter Berlin-Britz was a broadcasting facility for medium wave, shortwave and FM on the site of a former tree nursery in Berlin-Britz. It was established in 1946 and until 1993 it was the most important transmitter of RIAS, in American Sector of Berlin during the Cold War. It was used by Deutschlandradio until 4 September 2013, and was finally demolished on 18 July 2015.

The Berlin-Britz transmitter initially used a wire supported between two 30-metre (98 ft) tall wooden poles. This aerial was replaced in 1947 by a 60 m (197 ft) guyed insulated steel framework mast. This mast was replaced in turn in 1948 by two guyed insulated steel framework masts, each with a height of 100 m (328 ft) and which still exist today. These masts were extended in subsequent years so that today they are 160 m (525 ft) and 144 m (472 ft) tall and carry FM radio broadcasting antennas.

Since 1949 the Berlin-Britz transmitter has also been a shortwave transmission facility. A dipole aerial aligned in east–west direction was installed. A second shortwave broadcasting aerial in the form of a dipole with whole length was built in 1983.

A cross dipole aerial for the medium wave frequency 990 kHz was built in 1978 to provide better coverage to the former East Germany for RIAS’ first channel. This aerial for circular polarization radiated vertically towards the ionosphere and permitted good reception of RIAS 1 in the entire former East Germany. This aerial was mounted on five guyed masts each with a height of 30.5 m (100 ft) and was shut down at the end of 1995.

== See also ==
- List of masts
