= Rundfunk im amerikanischen Sektor =

Radio and television station in the American Sector of Berlin during the Cold War

Coordinates: 52°28′51″N 13°20′14″E

- Type: Broadcast radio and television
- Country: Germany
- Headquarters: West Berlin, Germany

History
- Launch date: 7 February 1946
- Closed: 31 December 1993
- Replaced by: Deutschlandradio; Deutsche Welle (DW-TV)

Coverage
- Availability: National

Rundfunk im amerikanischen Sektor (RIAS; lit. 'Radio in the American Sector') was a radio and television station in the American Sector of Berlin during the Cold War. It was founded by the US occupational authorities after World War II in 1946 to provide the German population in and around Berlin with news and political reporting.

== History ==
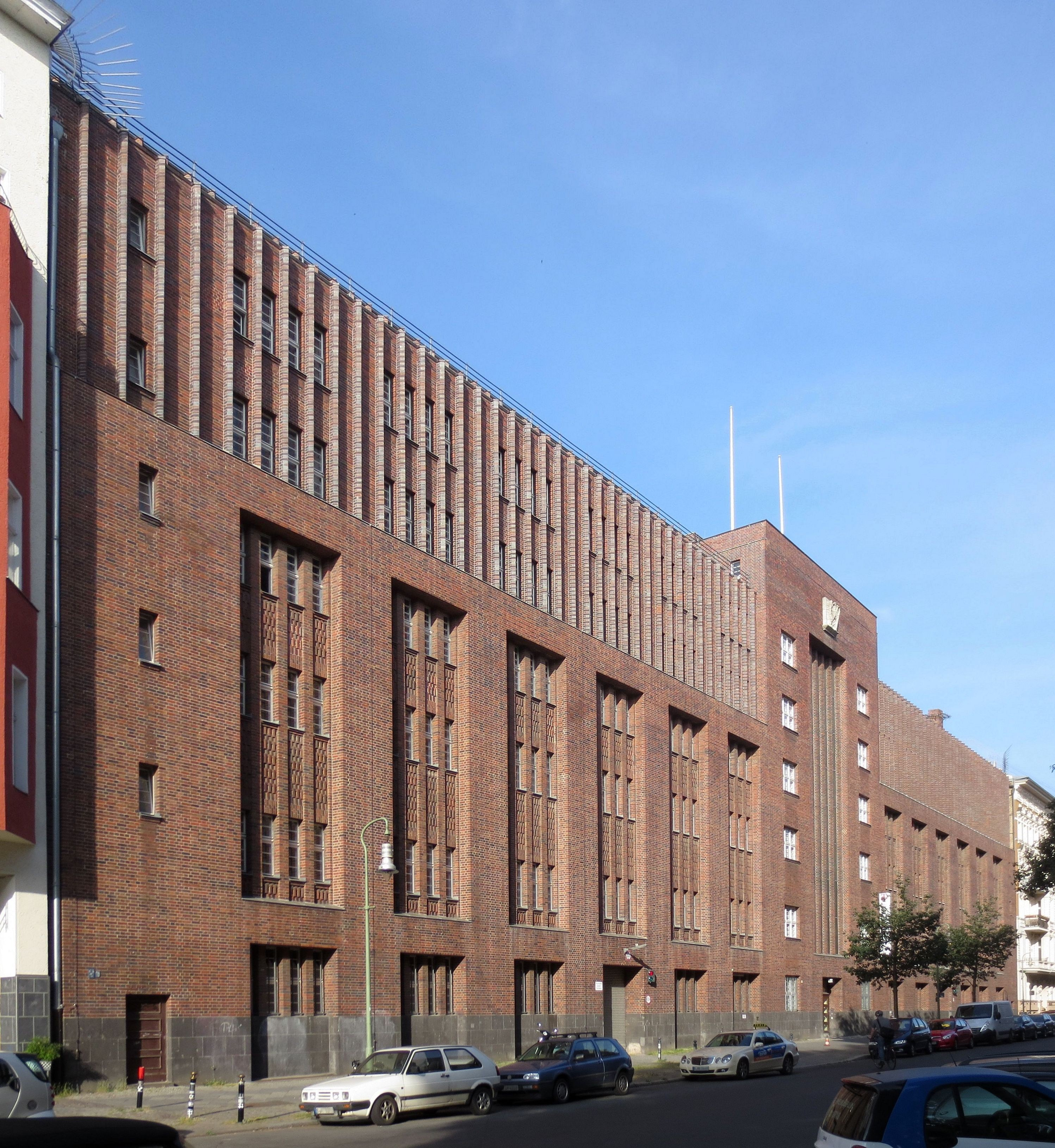
First location, former Reichspost telephone exchange on Winterfeldtstraße

By the end of 1945 the US Military Administration in Berlin decided to establish its own broadcasting system, after the Soviet Military Administration in Germany had refused to provide air time on the Berliner Rundfunk radio station. Supervised by the US Information Control Division, broadcasting commenced on 7 February 1946. For the first months the programme could be distributed via telephone line only (as DIAS – Drahtfunk im amerikanischen Sektor), until a first medium wave transmitter was installed in September.

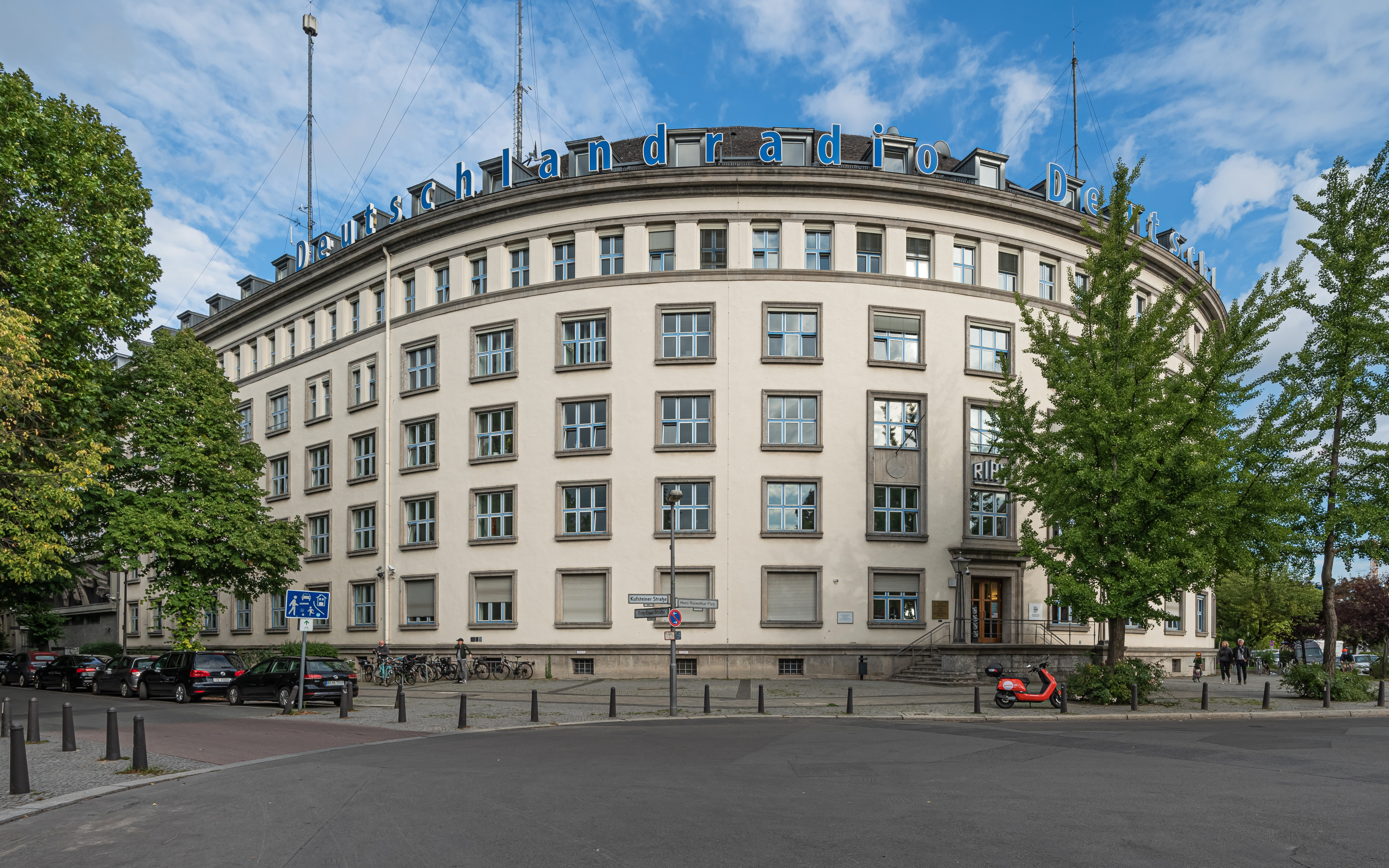
Former IG Farben branch office on Kufsteiner Straße, RIAS broadcasting centre from 1948, now headquarters of Deutschlandradio Kultur

By its creative and innovative programming, the station quickly gained much popularity. Its importance was magnified during the Berlin Blockade in 1948-49, when it carried the message of Allied determination to resist Soviet intimidation. At the same time, the RIAS Symphony Orchestra under chief conductor Ferenc Fricsay and a professional chamber choir, the Rundfunkchor des RIAS were also established by the US forces; together with the RIAS Dance Orchestra and the RIAS Big Band, they largely contributed to the station's entertainment programme under the editorship of the former Berliner Rundfunk employee Hans Rosenthal.

After the Berlin blockade, RIAS (by now carried on terrestrial medium wave and later FM transmitters) evolved into a surrogate home service for East Germans, as it broadcast news, commentary, and cultural programs that were unavailable in the controlled media of the German Democratic Republic. By own account "a free voice of the free world", the station aired the chime of the Freedom Bell each Sunday at noon, followed by an excerpt from the text of the "Declaration of Freedom". Listening to it in Soviet-controlled East Germany was discouraged. After the workers' riots in East Germany in 1953, which were the result of the government's raising of food prices and factory production quotas, the Communist government blamed the incident on RIAS and the CIA.

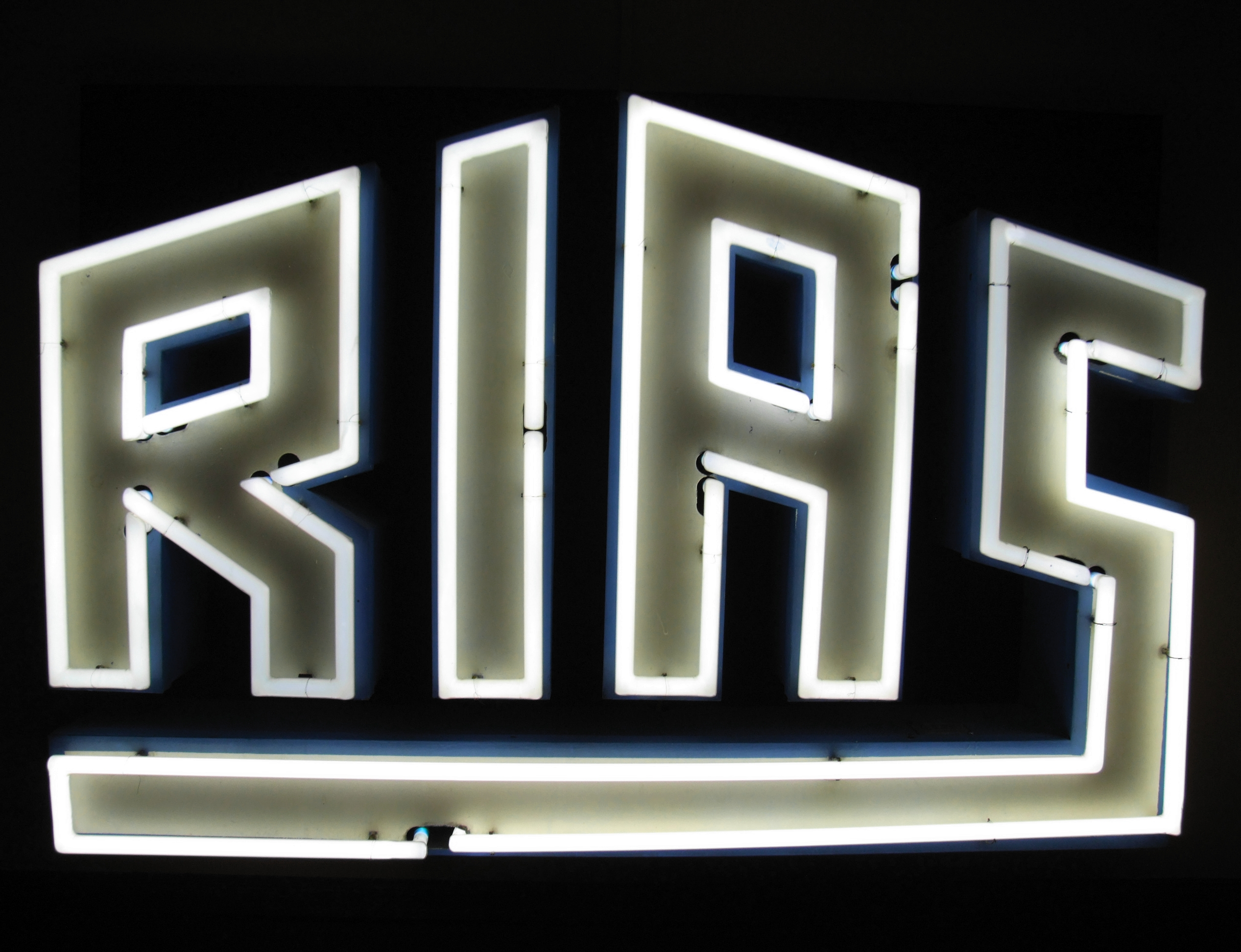
RIAS neon sign

Eventually RIAS was jointly funded and managed by the United States and West Germany. Under the supervision of the United States Information Agency from 1965, the station was staffed almost entirely with German employees, who worked under a small American management team. It maintained a large research component during the Cold War, and interviewed travellers from East Germany and compiled material from the East German Communist media, and broadcast programs for specific groups in East Germany, such as youths, women, farmers, even border guards. RIAS had a huge audience in East Germany and was the most popular foreign radio service. This audience began to shrink only when West German television became widely available to viewers in East Germany. A second radio programme, then called RIAS 2, was launched in 1953; it was remodelled as a youth radio station from 1985.

== Television ==
Penetration of West German TV reception (red) in East Germany for ARD (regional channels NDR, HR, BR and SFB). Areas with no reception (dark grey) were jokingly referred to as "Valley of the Clueless" (Tal der Ahnungslosen) while ARD was said to stand for "Außer Rügen und Dresden" (Except Rügen and Dresden).

RIAS-TV, began broadcasting (as a part-time optout on the terrestrial frequency of SAT.1) from West Berlin in August 1988, which also acquired the German Educational Television Network in United States. Prior to this there were no Western television broadcasts specifically targeted at East Germany, although many of the domestic West German TV networks (particularly ARD) had high power transmitters along the inner German border and could be received throughout most of East where many of their programmes attracted a larger audience than the official East German domestic broadcasters.

The fall of the Berlin Wall in 1989 and German reunification the following year meant that RIAS-TV would be short lived. In 1992 Deutsche Welle (Germany's international broadcaster) inherited the RIAS-TV broadcast facilities, using them to start a German, English and Spanish language television channel broadcast via satellite.

== Transmitters ==
The station's most important transmitter was at Berlin-Britz (on 612 kHz). Later a second transmitter at Hof in Bavaria was added to improve reception in the southern parts of East Germany (on 684 kHz), which was switched on at sunset to cover Germany with skywave. In addition to medium wave, the station also transmitted on shortwave on a frequency of 6.005 MHz. The Hof facility was closed and carted off to Mühlacker in 1994, though the Berlin-Britz facility remained in service until 2013, transmitting the programmes of Deutschlandradio Kultur; it was finally dismantled in 2015.

== Mentions ==
Mentioned throughout Upton Sinclair's "The Return of Lanny Budd", the final book of the Lanny Budd series, from 1953, where it serves as a major setting for multiple chapters.

== See also ==
- Radio Free Europe
- Voice of America
- Radio forces françaises de Berlin
- Broadcasting in East Germany
  - Deutscher Fernsehfunk, the East German television organisation also known as Fernsehen der DDR
  - Rundfunk der DDR, the East German radio organisation
