= Aktuaalne kaamera =

Estonian television news program

- Genre: News programme
- Country of origin: Estonia
- Original languages: Eesti, Russian

Production
- Producer: ERR
- Production location: Tallinn
- Camera setup: Multi-camera
- Running time: 30 minutes

Original release
- Network: ETV, ETV2 and ETV+
- Release: 11 March 1956 – present

Aktuaalne kaamera ("Current camera"; abbreviated AK) is an Estonian television news program shown in Eesti Televisioon. They first broadcast on March 11, 1956, which makes AK the oldest continuously running television program in Estonia.

Since October 1958, AK broadcasts every day. Earlier, it was every week.

The name "Aktuaalne kaamera" is derived from the East German television program Aktuelle Kamera.
