= Aktuelle Kamera =

East German flagship state television newscast (1952–1990)

- The Aktuelle Kamera logo from 1988 to 1990 and is also the first (and only) logo in 3D.
- Starring: See Hosts below
- Country of origin: East Germany
- Original language: German
- No. of episodes: over 12,000

Production
- Running time: 30 minutes (per episode)

Original release
- Network: DFF
- Release: 21 December 1952 – 14 December 1990

Aktuelle Kamera news opening used from 1972 to 1987

Aktuelle Kamera (Current Camera) was the flagship television newscast of Deutscher Fernsehfunk, the state broadcaster of the German Democratic Republic (known as Fernsehen der DDR from 11 February 1972 to 11 March 1990). It was on air from 21 December 1952 (daily broadcasts did not take place until 11 October 1957) to 14 December 1990.

== Editorial line ==
Originally, Aktuelle Kamera was (at least by Eastern Bloc standards) fairly critical of the ruling Socialist Unity Party. This was because television was not considered part of the mass media at the time due to its limited reach. However, this changed when the television service reported accurately on the uprising in East Berlin on 17 June 1953. In the repression following the uprising, DFF's director was sacked. Afterwards, DFF/DDR-FS's newsroom was directly linked to the SED Politburo, and Aktuelle Kamera took on a similar look to its radio and newspaper counterparts. For most of the next 37 years, it had a marked pro-government bias and typically did not report on news that could potentially fuel anti-government sentiment. With few exceptions, stories promoted socialism and portrayed the West in a negative manner.

== Schedule and popularity ==
Aktuelle Kamera's main edition was initially scheduled at 20:00 before being moved to 19:30 in the 1960s, so as not to coincide with the major West German newscasts, ZDF's heute at 19:00 and the ARD's Tagesschau at 20:00, both of which were widely watched in East Germany. The broadcast lasted 20 minutes until 1972 when it was expanded to a full half-hour.

Aktuelle Kamera newscast as seen on a Rembrandt television set, made in East Germany in the 1950s-1960s.

Starting in the mid-1970s, another 30-minute edition was presented on DDR2 (launched on 3 October 1969) around 21:30. Prior to that, both channels aired Aktuelle Kamera simultaneously at 19:30, then repeated the following day when DDR1 signed on around 9:30 (later 8:30), before airing school-oriented programming, co-produced by the DDR-FS and the GDR Education Ministry.

the logo of the programme from 1973 to 1989

News summaries were added as the transmissions increased during the day. There was a bulletin at the end of the morning programs (i.e. between 12:00 and 13:00) and another, the afternoon news update, at 17:00 on DDR1. DDR2's evening schedule always began with the news at 18:45 (later 17:45 and 18:55). Late newscasts did not appear until the 1970s when DDR1 screened a headline update following the magazine programs, around 22:00. From the 1980s, Aktuelle Kamera's final round-up was the last scheduled program at the end of the day.

In fact, television audiences largely ignored Aktuelle Kamera, preferring to watch West German newscasts, like the ARD's Tagesschau. The East German authorities adopted the French color standard SECAM rather than the PAL encoding used in the Federal Republic of Germany. The basic television standard remained the same. It did prevent reception in color by native East German television sets though the majority of them were monochrome (black and white) anyway.

East Germans responded by buying PAL decoders for their SECAM television sets. Eventually, the government in East Berlin stopped paying attention to so-called Republikflucht via Fernsehen, or "defection via television" and from 1977 onwards permitted the sale of dual standard (PAL/SECAM) sets; the SECAM standard stopped being used in East Germany after reunification, instead using PAL as it had been in the West.

Aktuelle Kamera served as an example for the Estonian newscast Aktuaalne kaamera that was first aired in Eesti Televisioon on 11 March 1956. Aktuaalne Kaamera, even after several changes in format and Estonia restoring its independence, still airs as a daily newscast there today.

== Coverage during the last days of GDR ==
Starting in October 1989 almost a month before the fall of the Berlin Wall (9 November), Aktuelle Kamera loosened its fidelity to the party line and began presenting fair reports about the events transforming East Germany at the time. On 16 October, it showed its first pictures of the massive opposition rallies taking place every Monday in Leipzig. Within two days of its historic coverage of the Monday demonstrations in East Germany, AK broadcast highlights of the dramatic October SED plenum that saw the mass removal of the party leadership and of several members of its Central Committee.

On 30 October 1989, Aktuelle Kamera on DDR2 was rebranded as AK Zwo. Three months later, long after the Berlin Wall fell but before German reunification, AK Zwo's theme and graphics were carried over to Aktuelle Kamera versions on the DFF1 (the former DDR1) on 12 March 1990. The 12:50 newscast was from then known as AK am Mittag ("CC at Midday") and the main broadcast at 19:30 became AK am Abend ("CC Evening"). News summaries received the generic name of AK-Nachrichten (simply "CC-News") or AK-Kurznachrichten.

The 1990 editions featured highlights of the events on the eve of national reunification (2–3 October) and on the day itself.

== Fate after reunification ==
The last AK am Abend was anchored by Wolfgang Meyer on 14 December 1990 at 19:30, while the last newscast as Aktuelle Kamera was anchored by Petra Kusch-Lück at 1:00 on DFF1. The following day, DFF's newscasts were re-titled Aktuell ("Current"). East German television was reduced to one channel, after DFF1 folded, its transmitters becoming part of the Erstes Deutsches Fernsehen (now Das Erste) network.

On 1 January 1992 at 0:00 (midnight), the former DFF2 was regionalised and incorporated into the ARD as the regional channel ("Dritte Programme" – "Third programme") for the "New Länder" under the names of Mitteldeutscher Rundfunk Fernsehen (Saxony, Saxony-Anhalt, Thuringia), ORB-Fernsehen (Brandenburg, later merged with Sender Freies Berlin to form Rundfunk Berlin-Brandenburg on 1 May 2003) and N3 (Mecklenburg-Vorpommern).

In October 1999, the AK news broadcasts were re-run on a daily basis to mark 10 years to the events leading to the fall of the Berlin Wall and German reunification. The news programs were broadcast one a day, corresponding to their original broadcast date a decade earlier. The rebroadcasts provided a daily contrast between the reunited Germany of 1999 and the last months of the DDR in 1989 by giving a daily window into the past.

== Legacy ==
Aktuelle Kamera has been considered an aspect of Ostalgie—a term coined in 1992 by East German comedian Uwe Steimle to refer to nostalgia for aspects of life in the DDR. The programme (and Ostalgie in general) is used prominently as a plot point in the 2003 German film Good Bye, Lenin!, which follows the children of a mother who had awoken from a months-long coma that began shortly before reunification. To prevent a potentially fatal emotional shock since she was a supporter of the ruling Socialist Unity Party, the children attempted to conceal the reunification through increasingly elaborate means, including showing her videotapes of East German television shows such as Aktuelle Kamera. Eventually, the children have to film their own versions of the newscast to maintain and support their ruse.

== Hosts ==
Aktuelle Kamera's principal presenters from 1952 to 1990:

- Herbert Köfer
- Klaus Feldmann
- Elisabeth Süncksen
- Hans-Dieter Lange
- Angelika Unterlauf
- Wolfgang Meyer
- Wolfgang Lippe
- Matthias Schliesing
- Renate Krawielicki
- Anne-Rose Neumann
- Peter Kessel
- Christel Kern
- Klaus Ackermann
- Heidrun Schulz

== Editor-in-chiefs ==
- 1954–1956: Günter Nerlich
- 1956–1964: Heinz Grote
- 1964–1966: Hubert Kröning
- 1966–1978: Erich Selbmann
- 1978–1984: Ulrich Meier
- 1984–1990: Klaus Schickhelm
- 1990–1991: Manfred Pohl

== See also ==
- Aktuaalne kaamera
- Bodo (news programme)
