= Kitzbüheler Horn Transmitter =

Kitzbüheler Horn Transmitter
Base data
Site:	Kitzbüheler Horn
Owner:	ORS
Location:	47°28′33″N 12°25′47″E
Elevation:	1964 metres above NN
Use:	Television tower, not open to the public
Built:	1967–1969
Technical data
Height:	102 metres
Material:	reinforced concrete

The Kitzbüheler Horn Transmitter (German: Sender Kitzbüheler Horn) is a 102-metre-high (335 ft) transmission tower made of reinforced concrete on the summit of the Kitzbüheler Horn near Kitzbühel in Austria. The Kitzbühler Horn Transmitter does not have a cylindrical shaft. It broadcasts TV and VHF radio programmes. The tower was taken into service on 12 December 1969 as a combined radio and television transmission facility for the ORF after a difficult two-year-long construction period, preceded by lengthy and intensive negotiations with local authorities and land owners.

To facilitate the switchover to DVB-T, the analogue channels ORF 1 (Channel 5, 3 kW) and ORF 2 - Tirol (Channel 24, 30 kW) were switched off on 22 October 2007.

== Frequencies and programmes ==
=== Analogue radio (VHF) ===
Frequency [MHz]	Programme	RDS PI	ERP [kW]	Polar diagram circular (ND)/directional (D)	Polarization horizontal (H)/vertical (V)
95.4	Ö2 - Radio Tirol	RADIO___TIROL	4.5	D	H
97.5	Ö1	OE___1	4.5	D	H
99.9	FM4	FM4	4.5	D	H
103.4	Life Radio Tirol (St. Johann in Tirol)	*LIFE*	0.2	D	H
103.9	Ö3	HITRADIO*OE_3	4.5	D	H
106.8	Life Radio Tirol (Kitzbühel)	*LIFE*	0.5	D	H

=== Digital television (DVB-T) ===
Channel	Frequency [MHz]	Multiplex	Programmes in multiplex	ERP [kW]	Polar diagram circular (ND)/ directional (D)	Polarization horizontal (H)/ vertical (V)	Modulation technique	FEC	Guard interval	Bit rate [MBit/s]
23	490	MUX A	ORF 1; ORF 2 Tirol; ORF 2 Vorarlberg; ATV	2	D	H	16-QAM	1/4	3/4	14.93
