= Karl-Eduard von Schnitzler =

German journalist (1918–2001)

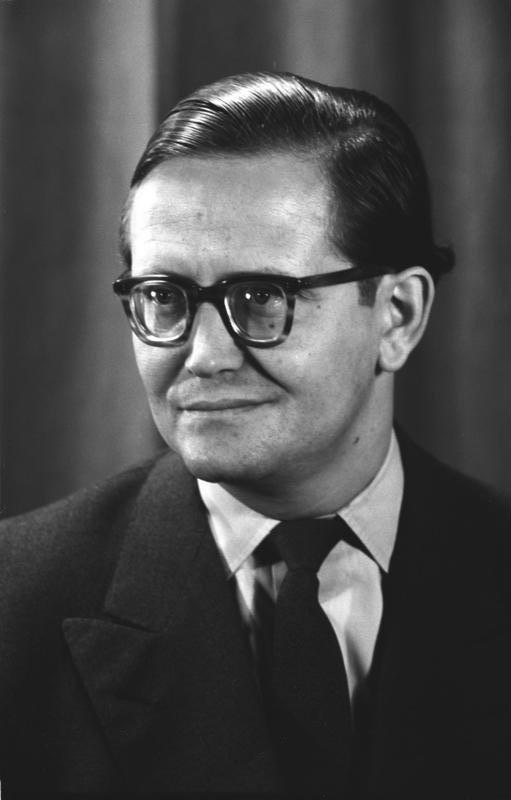
- von Schnitzler in 1956
- Born: 28 April 1918; Dahlem, Province of Brandenburg, Kingdom of Prussia, German Empire (now Berlin-Dahlem, Germany)
- Died: 20 September 2001 (aged 83); Zeuthen, Brandenburg, Germany
- Occupations: Politician; Propagandist; Journalist
- Political party: SED-PDS (1989–1990); Socialist Unity Party (1948–1989)
- Spouse(s): Marlis Hoeres (1940); Inge Keller (1952); Christine Laszar (1958); Marta Rafael (1960)
- Children: Stephan (von) Schnitzler; Barbara Schnitzler; Karin Schnitzler

Karl-Eduard von Schnitzler (28 April 1918 – 20 September 2001) was a German journalist and host of the television show Der schwarze Kanal (German: The Black Channel) from 1960 to 1989.

== Early life ==
Schnitzler was born in Berlin, the son of German vice consul Julius Eduard von Schnitzler, scion of a Cologne banking dynasty, who had been ennobled by the state of Prussia in 1913. Karl-Eduard attended a boarding school at Bad Godesberg and joined the Sozialistische Arbeiter-Jugend youth organisation of the Social Democratic Party of Germany in 1932. After receiving his school-leaving qualification in 1937, he began studying medicine at the University of Freiburg.

== Early career ==
Abandoning his medical studies, Schnitzler trained for a business career in Cologne and embarked on a commercial apprenticeship. In 1939, he became the owner of a delivery business. When the Second World War broke out in 1939, Schnitzler was drafted into the Wehrmacht. He was taken prisoner by British forces in 1944, following the Battle of Normandy. After his capture, he began to work for the British Ministry of Information and for the German-language service of the BBC, where his talents as a broadcaster were soon recognised. After his release in 1945, he returned to the British Zone of Allied occupied Germany and became an employee of the British controlled radio station Nordwestdeutscher Rundfunk (NWDR) in Hamburg. He was transferred to their Cologne studios on 1 January 1946, where he was assigned to the post of Associate Director and Head of the Politics Department. His political bias soon became apparent to his superiors and he was removed from his position in Cologne and returned to the NWDR's Hamburg offices until his eventual dismissal in 1947, after being accused of spreading communist propaganda.

== Career in the GDR ==
Schnitzler moved to the Soviet occupation zone, where he worked for the Berliner Rundfunk and the Deutschlandsender program of the Rundfunk der DDR. He joined the Socialist Unity Party in 1948. During the 1950s, he contributed to a number of smaller television shows before the first broadcast of Der Schwarze Kanal on 21 March 1960. The programme was originally designed as East Germany's answer to the short-lived West German anti-Communist programme Die Rote Optik ("The Red View", ARD, 1958–1960). From 1969 on, though, Schnitzler's main antagonist in the west was Gerhard Löwenthal's ZDF Magazin (ZDF, 1969–1987), which focused on human rights issues in East Germany.

As host of Der Schwarze Kanal, which ran for 20 minutes every Monday night, Schnitzler edited together extracts of Western television footage and recorded caustic, virulently anti-Western commentary over it. The show was particularly derisive towards West Germany and what Schnitzler perceived as Western imperialism across the world. His vitriolic style earned him the nickname Sudel-Ede – roughly, "Besmirching Eddie". Schnitzler joined the central committee of the Society for German–Soviet Friendship in 1978. In that same year, he also became a professor at the University of Film and Television in Potsdam-Babelsberg. He became known among other communist politicians as a hardliner.

== Post-GDR career and death ==
In the course of the 1989 Wende in East Germany, Der Schwarze Kanal was cancelled. Schnitzler pre-empted his exclusion from the now new named SED Party of Democratic Socialism by quitting and joining the German Communist Party. In Schnitzler's late career, he published several articles in the satirical magazine Titanic and continued to work with the small German Communist Party. In 1998, Schnitzler appeared on the local German television talk show Ich stelle mich (TV Berlin). Schnitzler maintained that his show was truthful, and continued to support several GDR policies. Schnitzler would retire to Zeuthen, where he died of pneumonia on 20 September 2001.

Interviews with Schnitzler can be found in Stasiland by Anna Funder and The Saddled Cow by Anne McElvoy.

== Sources ==
- Funder, Anna (2003). Stasiland: Stories from behind the Berlin Wall. London: Granta. ISBN 978-1-86207-655-6. OCLC 55891480.
- Gerlof, Kathrin: GegenSpieler: Gerhard Löwenthal, Karl-Eduard von Schnitzler. Fischer-Taschenbuch-Verlag, Frankfurt 1999, ISBN 3-596-14183-4.
- Prase, Tilo, Kretzschmar, Judith: Propagandist und Heimatfilmer. Die Dokumentarfilme des Karl-Eduard von Schnitzler (= Materialien – Analysen – Zusammenhänge. 10). Leipziger Universitätsverlag, Leipzig 2003, ISBN 3-937209-28-X.
- Axel Schildt (2007). "Schnitzler, Karl-Eduard Richard Arthur Gerhard von". Neue Deutsche Biographie (in German). Vol. 23. Berlin: Duncker & Humblot. pp. 333–334. (full text online).
- Goodrum, Sarah: A Socialist Family of Man. Rita Maahs’ and Karl-Eduard von Schnitzler’s Exhibition „Vom Glück des Menschen“. In: Zeithistorische Forschungen 12 (2015), p. 370–382.
