= Medium wave =

Radio transmission using wavelengths 200-1000 m

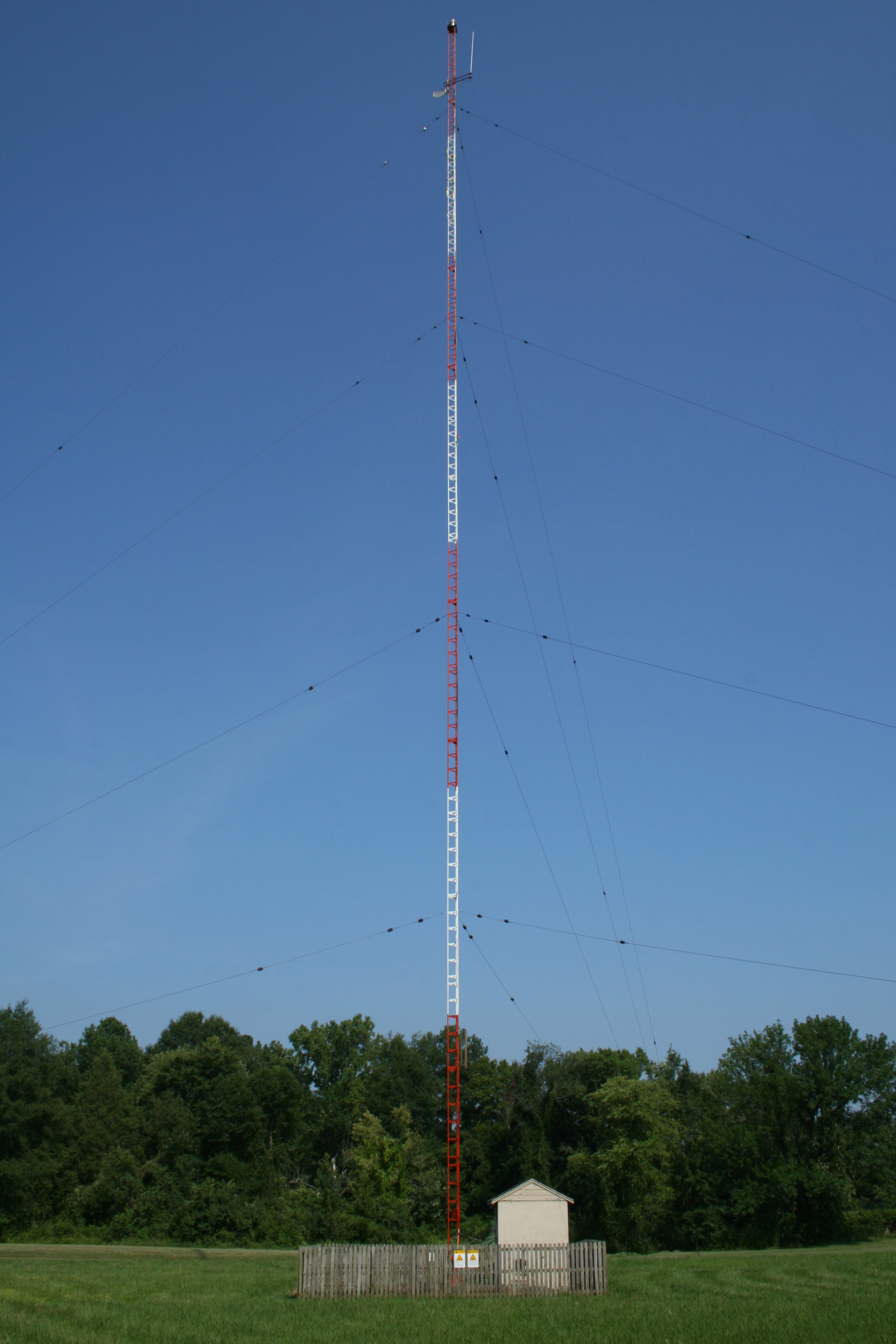
Typical mast radiator of a commercial medium wave AM broadcasting station, Chapel Hill, North Carolina, U.S.

Medium wave (MW) is a part of the medium frequency (MF) radio band used mainly for AM radio broadcasting. The spectrum provides about 120 channels with more limited sound quality than FM stations on the FM broadcast band. During the daytime, reception is usually limited to more local stations, though this is dependent on the signal conditions and quality of radio receiver used. Improved signal propagation at night allows the reception of much longer distance signals (within a range of about 2,000 km or 1,200 miles). This can cause increased interference because on most channels multiple transmitters operate simultaneously worldwide. In addition, amplitude modulation (AM) is often more prone to interference by various electronic devices, especially power supplies and computers. Strong transmitters cover larger areas than on the FM broadcast band but require more energy and longer antennas. Digital modes like HD Radio are used mostly in the US while DRM30 (excluding the shortwave) is mostly used for test transmissions in India, South Korea, and China.

MW was the main radio band for broadcasting from the beginnings in the 1920s into the 1950s until FM with a better sound quality took over. Many countries in Europe have switched off or limited their MW transmitters since the 2010s.

The term is a historic one, dating from the early 20th century, when the radio spectrum was divided on the basis of the wavelength of the waves into long wave (LW), medium wave, and short wave (SW) radio bands.

== Spectrum and channel allocation ==
Area	Range of carrier frequencies	Spacing	No. of channels
Europe, Asia, Africa	531–1602 kHz	9 kHz	120
Australia	531–1701 kHz (low power stations above 1602 kHz)	9 kHz	131
North and South America	520–1700 kHz	10 kHz	118

Franken-Longwave (FLW) is a section of MW 520 kHz to 810 kHz that sounds and behaves just like Longwave. Wavelengths of FLW is about 1,000 meters, and the Luxembourg effect occurs, shortly fading after 816 kHz. It has weak skywave, but strong groundwave.

^{See Longwave.}

For Europe, Africa and Asia the MW band consists of 120 channels with carrier frequencies from 531 to 1602 kHz spaced every 9 kHz. Frequency coordination avoids the use of adjacent channels in one area. The total allocated spectrum including the modulated audio ranges from 526.5 to 1606.5 kHz. Australia uses an expanded band up to 1701 kHz.

North and South America use 118 channels from 530 to 1700 kHz using 10 kHz spaced channels. The range above 1610 kHz is primarily only used by low-power stations; it is the preferred range for services with automated traffic, weather, and tourist information.

== Sound quality ==
The channel steps of 9 and 10 kHz would ordinarily require limiting the audio bandwidth to 4.5 and 5 kHz, respectively, without causing any interference to adjacent channels, because the audio spectrum is transmitted twice, once on each side band (i.e. ±4.5 kHz of carrier frequency for 9 kHz channels and ±5 kHz of carrier frequency for 10 kHz channels). This is adequate for talk and news but not for high-fidelity music. However, many stations use audio bandwidths up 10 kHz, which is not hi-fi but sufficient for casual listening. In the UK, until 2024 most stations used a bandwidth of 6.3 kHz. However in 2024, Ofcom expanded the allowed bandwidth to 9 kHz, giving a noticeable improvement in quality. With AM, it largely depends on the frequency filters of each receiver how the audio is reproduced. This is a major disadvantage compared to FM and digital modes where the demodulated audio is more objective. Extended audio bandwidths cause interference on adjacent channels.

== Propagation characteristics ==
Wavelengths in this band are long enough that radio waves are not blocked by buildings and hills and can propagate beyond the horizon following the curvature of the Earth; this is called the groundwave. Practical groundwave reception of strong transmitters typically extends to 200–300 miles (320–480 km), with greater distances over terrain with higher ground conductivity, and greatest distances over salt water. The groundwave reaches further on lower medium wave frequencies.

Medium waves can also reflect off charged particle layers in the ionosphere and return to Earth at much greater distances; this is called the skywave. At night, especially in winter months and at times of low solar activity, the lower ionospheric D layer virtually disappears. When this happens, MW radio waves can easily be received many hundreds or even thousands of miles away as the signal will be reflected by the higher F layer. This can allow very long-distance broadcasting, but can also interfere with distant local stations. Due to the limited number of available channels in the MW broadcast band, the same frequencies are re-allocated to different broadcasting stations several hundred miles apart. On nights of good skywave propagation, the skywave signals of a distant station may interfere with the signals of local stations on the same frequency. In North America, the North American Regional Broadcasting Agreement (NARBA) sets aside certain channels for nighttime use over extended service areas via skywave by a few specially licensed AM broadcasting stations. These channels are called clear channels, and they are required to broadcast at higher powers of 10 to 50 kW.

== Use in North America ==
Initially, broadcasting in the United States was restricted to two wavelengths: "entertainment" was broadcast at 360 meters (833 kHz), with stations required to switch to 485 meters (619 kHz) when broadcasting weather forecasts, crop price reports and other government reports. This arrangement had numerous practical difficulties. Early transmitters were technically crude and virtually impossible to set accurately on their intended frequency and if (as frequently happened) two (or more) stations in the same part of the country broadcast simultaneously the resultant interference meant that usually neither could be heard clearly. The Commerce Department rarely intervened in such cases but left it up to stations to enter into voluntary timesharing agreements amongst themselves. The addition of a third "entertainment" wavelength, 400 meters, did little to solve this overcrowding.

In 1923, the Commerce Department realized that as more and more stations were applying for commercial licenses, it was not practical to have every station broadcast on the same three wavelengths. On May 15, 1923, Commerce Secretary Herbert Hoover announced a new bandplan which set aside 81 frequencies, in 10 kHz steps, from 550 kHz to 1350 kHz (extended to 1500, then 1600 and ultimately 1700 kHz in later years). Each station would be assigned one frequency (albeit usually shared with stations in other parts of the country and/or abroad), no longer having to broadcast weather and government reports on a different frequency than entertainment. Class A and B stations were segregated into sub-bands.

In the US and Canada, the maximum transmitter power is restricted to 50 kilowatts, while in Europe, there are medium wave stations with transmitter power up to 2 megawatts daytime.

Most United States AM radio stations are required by the Federal Communications Commission (FCC) to shut down, reduce power, or employ a directional antenna array at night in order to avoid interference with each other due to night-time only long-distance skywave propagation (sometimes loosely called 'skip'). Those stations which shut down completely at night are often known as "daytimers". Similar regulations are in force for Canadian stations, administered by Industry Canada; however, daytimers no longer exist in Canada, the last station having signed off in 2013, after migrating to the FM band.

== Use in Europe ==
Many countries switched off most of their MW transmitters in the 2010s due to cost-cutting and smaller audiences for MW broadcasts. Among them are Germany, France, Russia, Poland, Sweden, the Benelux, Austria, Switzerland, Slovenia and most of the Balkans. Other countries that have no or few MW transmitters include Iceland, Ireland, Finland and Norway.

Large networks of transmitters remain in the UK, Spain and Romania. In the Netherlands and Scandinavia, some stations have launched low-power services in place of high-power frequencies. On 22 May 2017, the UK government regulator Ofcom awarded the former offshore "pirate radio" station Radio Caroline a community licence to broadcast to Suffolk and north Essex on 648 kHz with a power of 1 kW. The frequency had formerly been used by the BBC World Service. In Italy, the government closed its high power transmitters but low power private stations remain. As the MW band is thinning out, many remaining local stations as well as ones from North Africa and the Middle East can now be received all over Europe, but signal strength is often weak with much interference.

In Europe, each country is allocated a number of frequencies on which high power (up to 2 megawatts) can be used; the maximum power is also subject to international agreement by the International Telecommunication Union (ITU).

In most cases there are two power limits: a lower one for omnidirectional and a higher one for directional radiation with minima in certain directions. The power limit can vary depending on the time of day and it is possible that a station may not operate at nighttime, because it would then produce too much interference. Other countries may only operate low-powered transmitters on the same frequency, again subject to agreement. International medium wave broadcasting in Europe decreased markedly with the end of the Cold War and the increased availability of satellite and Internet TV and radio, although the cross-border reception of neighbouring countries' broadcasts by expatriates and other interested listeners still takes place.

In the late 20th century, overcrowding on the medium wave band was a serious problem in parts of Europe, contributing to the early adoption of VHF FM broadcasting by many stations (particularly in Germany). Due to the high demand for frequencies in Europe, many countries set up single frequency networks; in the United Kingdom, BBC Radio 5 Live broadcasts from various transmitters on either 693 or 909 kHz. These transmitters are carefully synchronized to minimize interference from more distant transmitters on the same frequency.

== Use in Asia ==
In Asia and the Middle East, many high-powered transmitters remain in operation. China, Indonesia, South Korea, North Korea, Japan, Thailand, Vietnam, the Philippines, Saudi Arabia, Egypt, India, Pakistan, Bangladesh and Iran still use medium wave. In Southeast Asia, some countries such as Indonesia and the Philippines continue to maintain and expand extensive networks of MW transmitters, mostly used by news/talk radio networks and state broadcasters, while some countries, such as Malaysia and Singapore, have shut off their medium wave networks.

Israel reactivated medium wave signals after the outbreak of Gaza war. However, it was closed back after few months.

China operates many single-frequency networks across the country.

As of May 2023, many Japanese broadcasters like NHK broadcast in medium wave, with many high power transmitters operating across Japan. There are also some low power relay transmitters for rural areas.

== Stereo and digital transmissions ==
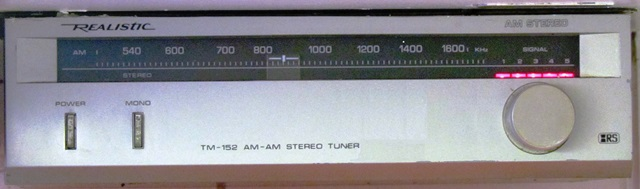
Realistic TM-152 AM stereo tuner c. 1988

Stereo transmission is possible and is or was offered by some stations in the U.S., Canada, Mexico, the Dominican Republic, Paraguay, Australia, The Philippines, Japan, South Korea, South Africa, Italy and France. However, there have been multiple standards for AM stereo. C-QUAM is the official standard in the United States as well as other countries, but receivers that implement the technology are no longer readily available to consumers. Used receivers with AM Stereo can be found. Names such as "FM/AM Stereo" or "AM & FM Stereo" can be misleading and usually do not signify that the radio will decode C-QUAM AM stereo, whereas a set labelled "FM Stereo/AM Stereo" or "AMAX Stereo" will support AM stereo.

In September 2002, the United States Federal Communications Commission approved the proprietary iBiquity in-band on-channel (IBOC) HD Radio system of digital audio broadcasting, which is meant to improve the audio quality of signals. The Digital Radio Mondiale (DRM) system standardised by ETSI supports stereo and is the ITU-approved system for use outside North America and U.S. territories. Some HD Radio receivers also support C-QUAM AM stereo, although this feature is usually not advertised by the manufacturer.

== Antennas ==
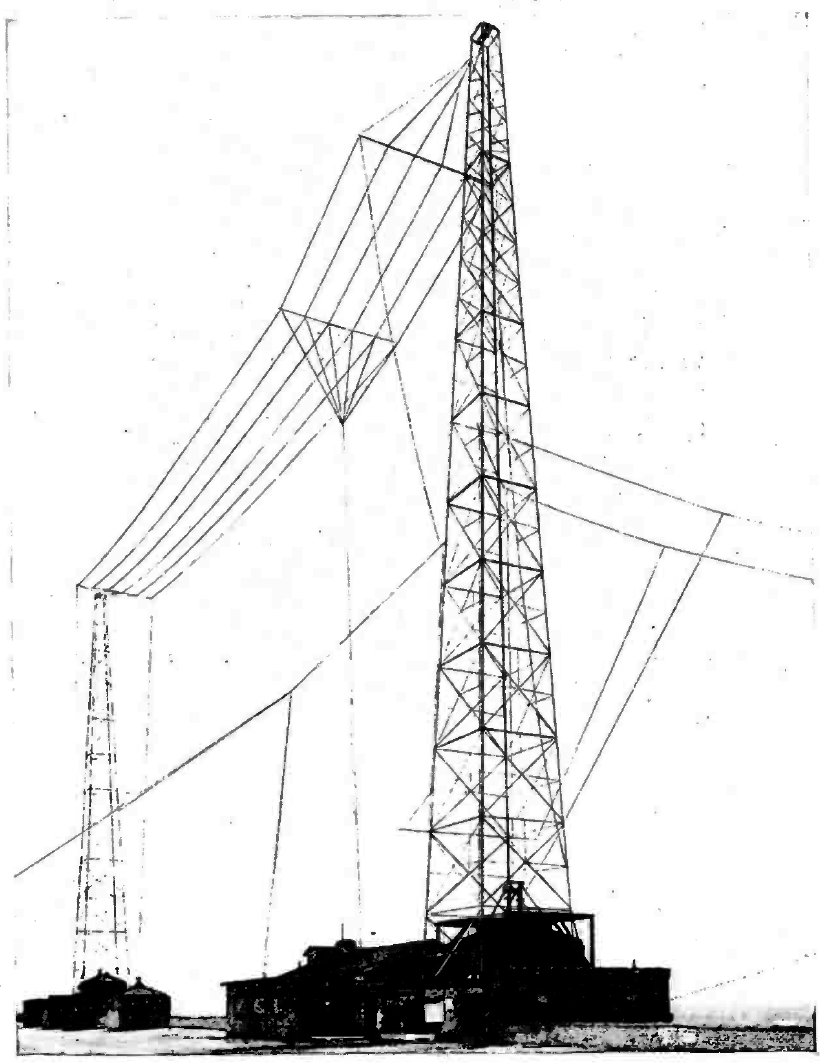
Multiwire T antenna of radio station WBZ, Massachusetts, USA, 1925. T antennas were the first antennas used for medium wave broadcasting, and are still used at lower power.

For broadcasting, mast radiators are the most common type of antenna used, consisting of a steel lattice guyed mast in which the mast structure itself is used as the antenna. Stations broadcasting with low power can use masts with heights of a quarter-wavelength (about 310 millivolts per meter using one kilowatt at one kilometre) to 5/8 wavelength (225 electrical degrees; about 440 millivolts per meter using one kilowatt at one kilometre), while high power stations mostly use half-wavelength to 5/9 wavelength. The usage of masts taller than 5/9 wavelength (200 electrical degrees; about 410 millivolts per meter using one kilowatt at one kilometre) with high power gives a poor vertical radiation pattern, and 195 electrical degrees (about 400 millivolts per meter using one kilowatt at one kilometre) is generally considered ideal in these cases. Mast antennas are usually series-excited (base driven); the feedline is attached to the mast at the base. The base of the antenna is at high electrical potential and must be supported on a ceramic insulator to isolate it from the ground. Shunt-excited masts, in which the base of the mast is at a node of the standing wave at ground potential and so does not need to be insulated from the ground, have fallen into disuse, except in cases of exceptionally high power, 1 megawatt or more, where series excitation might be impractical. If grounded masts or towers are required, cage or long-wire aerials are used. Another possibility consists of feeding the mast or the tower by cables running from the tuning unit to the guys or crossbars at a certain height.

Directional aerials consist of multiple masts, which need not to be of the same height. It is also possible to realize directional aerials for mediumwave with cage aerials where some parts of the cage are fed with a certain phase difference.

For medium-wave (AM) broadcasting, quarter-wave masts are between 153 feet (47 m) and 463 feet (141 m) high, depending on the frequency. Because such tall masts can be costly and uneconomic, other types of antennas are often used, which employ capacitive top-loading (electrical lengthening) to achieve equivalent signal strength with vertical masts shorter than a quarter wavelength. A "top hat" of radial wires is occasionally added to the top of mast radiators, to allow the mast to be made shorter. For local broadcast stations and amateur stations of under 5 kW, T- and L-antennas are often used, which consist of one or more horizontal wires suspended between two masts, attached to a vertical radiator wire. A popular choice for lower-powered stations is the umbrella antenna, which needs only one mast one-tenth wavelength or less in height. This antenna uses a single mast insulated from ground and fed at the lower end against ground. At the top of the mast, radial top-load wires are connected (usually about six) which slope downwards at an angle of 40–45 degrees as far as about one-third of the total height, where they are terminated in insulators and thence outwards to ground anchors. Thus the umbrella antenna uses the guy wires as the top-load part of the antenna. In all these antennas the smaller radiation resistance of the short radiator is increased by the capacitance added by the wires attached to the top of the antenna.

In some rare cases dipole antennas are used, which are slung between two masts or towers. Such antennas are intended to radiate a skywave. The medium-wave transmitter at Berlin-Britz for transmitting RIAS used a cross dipole mounted on five 30.5-metre-high guyed masts to transmit the skywave to the ionosphere at nighttime.

=== Receiving antennas ===
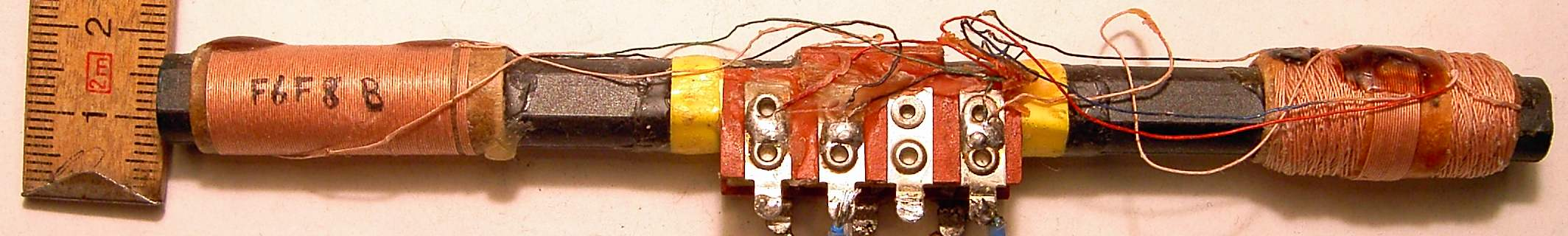
Typical ferrite rod antenna used in AM radio receivers

Because at these frequencies atmospheric noise is far above the receiver signal-to-noise ratio, inefficient antennas much smaller than a wavelength can be used for receiving. For reception at frequencies below 1.6 MHz, which includes long and medium waves, loop antennas are popular because of their ability to reject locally generated noise. By far the most common antenna for broadcast reception is the ferrite-rod antenna, also known as a loopstick antenna. The high permeability ferrite core allows it to be compact enough to be enclosed inside the radio's case and still have adequate sensitivity. For weak signal reception or to discriminate between different signals sharing a common frequency directional antennas are used. For best signal-to-noise ratio these are best located outdoors away from sources of electrical interference. Examples of such medium wave antennas include broadband untuned loops, elongated terminated loops, wave antennas (e.g. the Beverage antenna) and the ferrite sleeve loop antenna.

== See also ==
- Digital Radio Mondiale, a digital standard that is applicable on the medium wave
- DAB radio
- FM radio
- List of European medium wave transmitters
- MW DX
- Satellite radio
- Geneva Frequency Plan of 1975
- Monopole antenna
