= Petra Kusch-Lück =

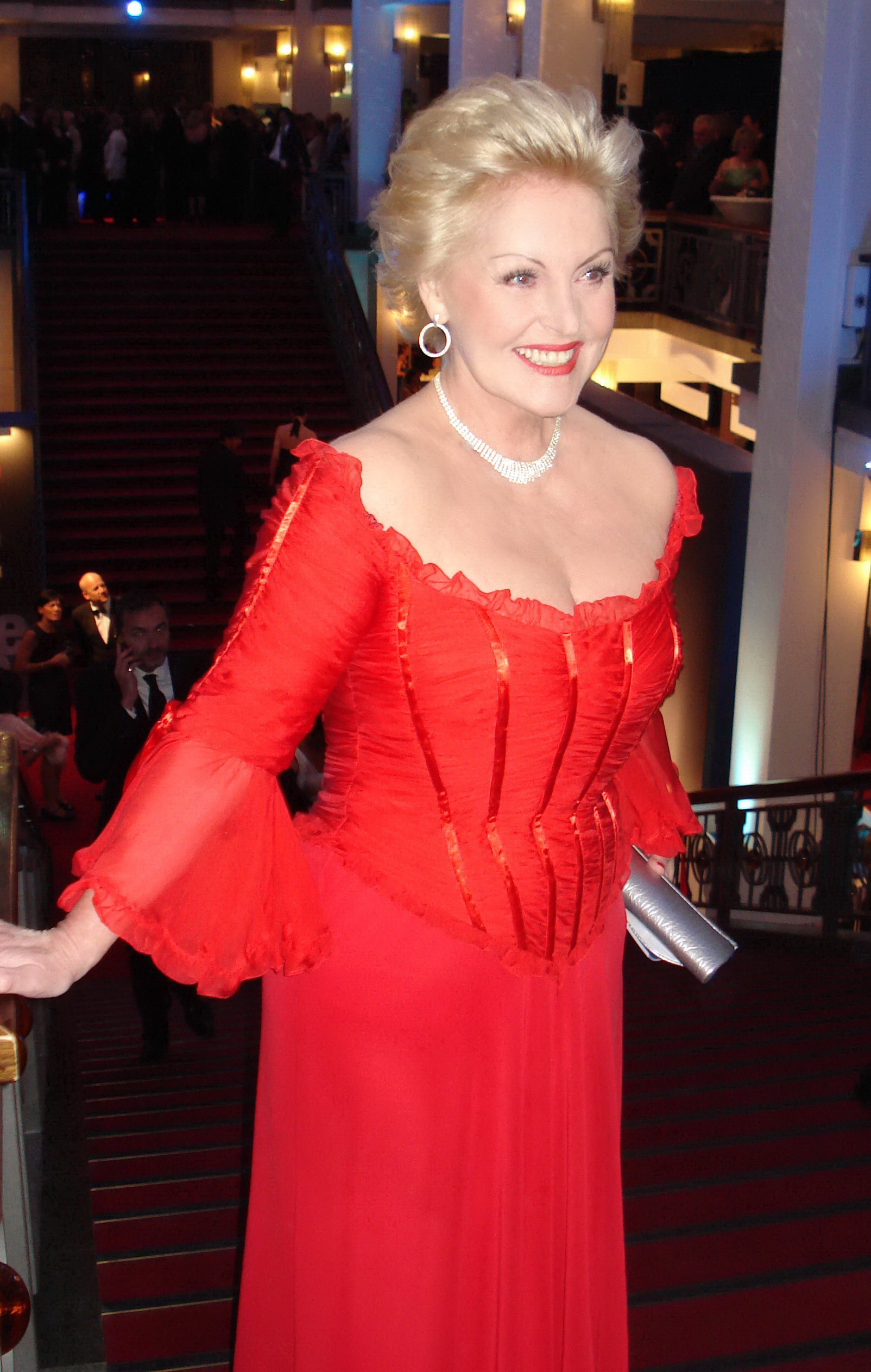
- Kusch-Lück at the Goldene Henne Awards in 2009
- Born: 6 April 1948 (age 78); Berlin, Germany
- Occupations: Presenter entertainer dancer singer
- Years active: 1969–present
- Website: http://www.landmusik.com

Petra Kusch-Lück (born 6 April 1948, in Berlin, Germany) is a German host, entertainer, dancer and singer.
