= Jahrbuch Medien und Geschichte =

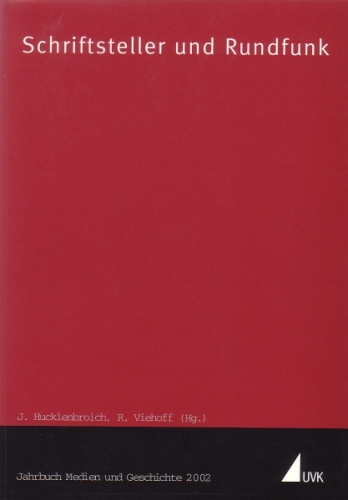
- Discipline: Media history
- Language: German
- Edited by: Christoph Rohde, Christian Schurig, Hans-Ulrich Wagner

Publication details
- History: 2001–present
- Publisher: Herbert von Halem Verlag (Germany)

Standard abbreviations
- ISO 4: Jahrb. Medien Gesch.

Indexing
- ISSN: 1617-3007
- OCLC no.: 85653038

Links
- Journal homepage; Journal page at publisher's website

The Jahrbuch Medien und Geschichte (English: Yearbook for Media and History) is an annual academic journal covering the history of mass media. The journal is published in German and (fewer articles) in English. It is the official journal of the "Studienkreis Rundfunk und Geschichte", a scientific association that was founded in 1968. Every yearbook has a single, unified theme. The contributions are not limited to the traditional aspects of radio and television research. The first editors had an expanded definition of media. The yearbook has been published from 2001 till 2005 by the UVK Verlagsgesellschaft and since 2011 by the Herbert von Halem Verlag. The current editors are Christoph Rohde, Christian Schurig, and Hans-Ulrich Wagner.
