= German Broadcasting Archive =

Television and radio archive

Coordinates: 52°23′23″N 13°07′11″E

The German Broadcasting Archive (Deutsches Rundfunkarchiv; DRA) is a non-profit foundation supported by the ARD. It was founded in 1952 as "German sound archive". The DRA covers essential aspects of the development of German broadcasting. Today it has two locations: Frankfurt am Main and Potsdam-Babelsberg (formerly Berlin-Adlershof).

== See also ==
- Rundfunk der DDR
- Jahrbuch Medien und Geschichte
- List of sound archives
