= Fernseh =

German television company

- Industry: Mass media
- Founded: July 3, 1929
- Headquarters: Berlin, Germany

Fernseh AG was a German television company headquartered in Berlin. Founded in 1929, it did research and manufacturing of television equipment.

== Etymology ==
The company name "Fernseh AG" is a compound of Fernsehen ‘television’ and Aktiengesellschaft (AG) ‘joint-stock company’. The company was mainly known by its German abbreviation "FESE". See the see also section on this page for other uses.

== Early years ==
The company was registered in Berlin on July 3, 1929, by John Logie Baird, Robert Bosch, Zeiss Ikon and D.S. Loewe as partners. John Baird owned Baird Television Ltd. in London, Zeiss Ikon was a camera company in Dresden, D.S. Loewe owned a company in Berlin and Robert Bosch owned a company, Robert Bosch GmbH, in Stuttgart. It had an initial capital of 100,000 Reichsmark.

In 1929 Fernseh AG's original board of directors included: Emanuel Goldberg, Oliver George Hutchinson (for Baird), David Ludwig Loewe, and Erich Carl Rassbach (for Bosch) and Eberhard Falkenstein who did the legal work. Carl Zeiss's company worked alongside the early Bosch company. Much of the early work was in the area of research and development. Along with early TV sets (DE-6, E1, DE10) Fernseh AG made the first "Remote Truck"/"OB van", an "intermediate-film" mobile television camera in August 1932. This was a film camera that had its film developed in the truck and a "telecine" then transmitted the signal almost "live".

== Fernseh GmbH ==
- In 1939 Robert Bosch GmbH took complete ownership of Fernseh AG when Zeiss Ikon AG sold its share of Fernseh AG.
- In 1952 Fernseh moved to Darmstadt, Germany, and increased its broadcast product line.
- In 1967 Fernseh, by then commonly called "Bosch Fernseh", introduced color TV products. Fernseh offered a full line of video and film equipment: professional video cameras, VTRs and telecine devices. On August 27, 1967, the first color TV program in Germany aired, with a live broadcast from a Bosch Fernseh outside broadcast (OB) van. The networks ZDF, NDR and WDR each acquired a new color OB van from Bosch Fernseh to begin broadcasting in color.

== Fernsehanlagen GmbH ==
In 1972 Robert Bosch renamed its TV division: Fernsehanlagen GmbH (Fernseh facilities). The company supplied almost all the studio equipment for the 1972 Summer Olympics in Munich. The Darmstadt HQ had over 2000 employees in 1972. In 1972 Fernseh started to manufacture SECAM TV studio equipment for Moscow.

== Fernseh Inc. ==
- In October 1979 Bell and Howell's TeleMation Inc. Division located in Salt Lake City, Utah, entered a joint venture with Robert Bosch GmbH, Bosch's Fernseh Division. The new joint venture was called Fernseh Inc., Bosch Fernseh Division, located in Darmstadt, Germany.
- In April 1982 Bosch fully acquired Fernseh Inc., renaming it "Robert Bosch Corporation, Fernseh Division".
- In 1986 Bosch entered into a new joint venture with Philips Broadcast in Breda, Netherlands. This new company was called Broadcast Television Systems or BTS inc. Philips had been in the Broadcast market for many years with a line of PC- and LDK- Norelco professional video cameras and other video products.
- In 1995 Philips Electronics North America Corp. fully acquired BTS Inc., renaming it Philips Broadcast-Philips Digital Video Systems. Philips sold many of the Spirit DataCines.
- In March 2001 this Philips division was sold to Thomson SA, the Division was call Thomson Multimedia. In 2002, the French electronics giant Thomson SA also acquired the Grass Valley Group from a private investor that had acquired it three years earlier from Tektronix in Beaverton, Oregon, USA. The name of this division of Thomson was shortened to Grass Valley. The Fernseh's Darmstadt factory, near the Darmstadt Train Station and European Space Operations Centre was moved a short distance to Weiterstadt, Germany. (Later, Grass Valley was sold to Belden on February 6, 2014. Belden also owned Miranda.)
- Thomson Film Division, located in Weiterstadt including the product line of Spirit DataCine 4K, Bones Workstation, Scanity realtime film scanner and LUTher 3D Color Space converter, was sold to Parter Capital Group. The sale was made public on Sept. 9, 2008 and completed on Dec. 1, 2008. The new Headquarters was still in Weiterstadt, the former Bosch Fernseh — BTS factory. Parter Capital Group continued to have worldwide offices to support products from Weiterstadt, Germany. The new name of the company is Digital Film Technology. DFT Digital Film Technology became part of a new company: Precision Mechatronics GmbH in Weiterstadt, Germany. On October 1, 2012 Precision Mechatronics and DFT were acquired by Prasad Group, part of Prasad Studios (2012-2024). In 2013 DFT moved from Weiterstadt to Arheilgen-Darmstadt, Germany.

== Products ==
- Home Television sets (later moved to the Blaupunkt Division) (1930- )
- Home Radios (later moved to the Blaupunkt Division) (1930- )
- Vacuum tubeTube tester
- Early mechanical Camera for Mechanical television 1938, "Universal mechanical scanner"
- Intermediate film system for Remote Truck (1936)
- "Farvimeter" a universal electrical testing device (1947)
- "Farvigraph" a universal Oscilloscope (1949)
- Slide scanner for station ID and test patterns (1955)
- Filmgeber film chain F16LP15 Analog
- Fernseh Theater TV system, 1935
- TV transmitter 1944
- Master control, B&W Video switcher
- Sound recorder — player, Diaabtaster DAT15, Fernseh
- B & W film chain
- OMY Color film chain - Analog
- BCM-40 and B&W BM-20 2 inch Quadruplex videotape 1966-70s
- B & W cameras like Videokamera s/w K11 VK9 HA
- M series monitors
- TV Oscilloscope
- Video-signal generators
- Television standards conversion(1970s) Analog Model NC 56 P 40, with Plumbicon tube camera inside.
- Transcoder to convert PAL to SECAM and SECAM to PAl. (1972)
- BCR pre BCN VTR
- BCN series 1 inch type B videotape (1979–1989) Analog VTR
- KC series color professional video camera KCU-40, KCR, KCK-40, KCK-R-40, KCP-40, KCP-60, KCA, KCF-1, KCM-125, KCA, KCN92, KCN(1967–1990),
- Color film chain, with KCU-40 camera
- MC series color and B&WVideo monitorMC-37, MC-50 MCH 51, MH 21
- OB Van - TV Remote Trucks - and Terminal Rack Equipment
- RME series Mixers — Switcher - Vision mixer, Analog
- FDL-60 Telecine - The world's first CCD telecine (1979–1989)
- FRP-60 Color Corrector-Color grading (1983–1989)
- FDL-90 Telecine (1989–1993) (now under BTS)
- Noise/Grain Reducer: FDGR, DNR7, MNR9, MNR10, MNR11, VS4, Scream, Scream 4k
- KCA-110 ENG Camera
- KCF-1 ENG Camera (later Quartercam, not sold)
- CCIR 601 Products CD7, DC7, 4X4 Booster, Test Gen. Encoders, Decoders.
- DD series CCIR 601-D1 Mixers - Vision mixer DD5, DD10, DD20, DD30
- DCR series D1 VTR DCR-100 DCR-300 DCR-500
- BCH 1000 HDTV 1" VTR
- KCH 1000 HDTV camera (RMH 1000)
- FLH 1000 Telecine The world's first HDTV CCD Telecine (1994–1996)
- Quadra 4:4:4 Telecine (1993–1998)
- D6 HDTV VTR Uncompressed HDTV VTR (VooDoo)-(Gigabit Data Recorder) (2000–2006) (Now under Philips)
- Spirit DataCine motion picture film scanner and HDTV Telecine SDC-2000 (1996–2006) also: SDC2001, SDC2002
- Phantom Transfer Engine Software for Spirit Datacine Telecine for Virtual telecine(1998-)
- Shadow HDTV Telecine STE (2000–2006)
- VDC-2000 Specter Virtual telecine (1999–2002)
- Specter FS Virtual telecine (2002–2006)
- Spirit DataCine 4k Datacine - Telecine (2004-2014) also Spirit Spirit 2k/Spirit-HD (now Under Thomson-Grassvalley)
- Bones Linux-Based Software for Spirit Datacine Telecine Transfer Engine Software (2005-2014 )
- Bones Dailies (2008-2014)
- LUTher 3D LUT Color Space (2005-2013)
- Flexxity (2011-2014)
- Scanity film scanner (2009- ) (Now under DFT)
- Phantom 2: Linux-Based transfer Engine software and workstation for Spirit Datacine (2014-) (Now under DFT)
- Polar HQ a 9.3K native scanner came out in 2023.

== Photo gallery ==
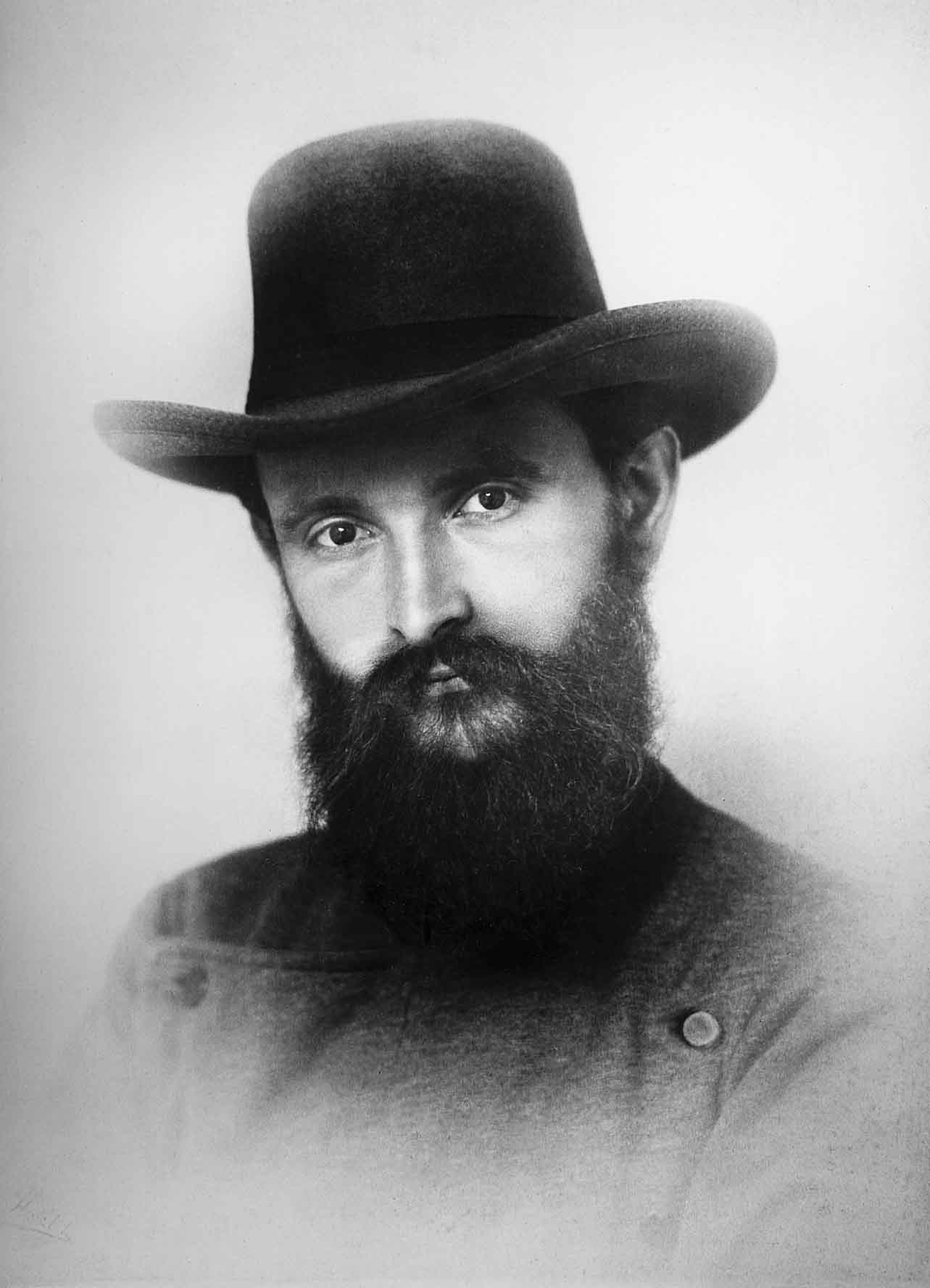
Robert Bosch in 1888

Intermediate film system for first Remote Truck (1936) - movie camera; 2 - film processor; 3 - washing bath; 4 - film drying compartment; 5 - telecine; 6 - monitor; 7 - video output; 8 - sewage; 9 - plumbing.

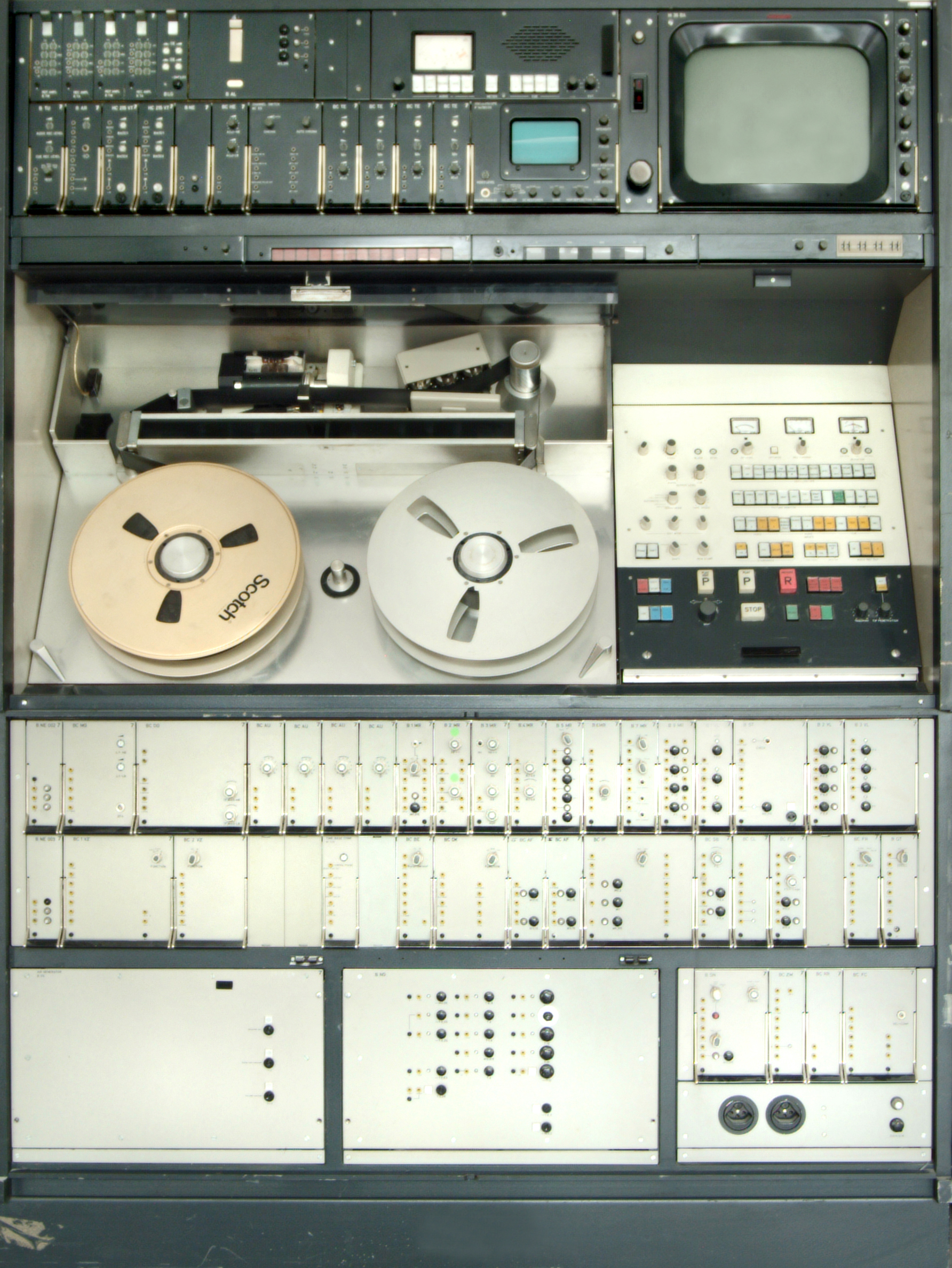
BOSCH Quad VTR Model BCM 40

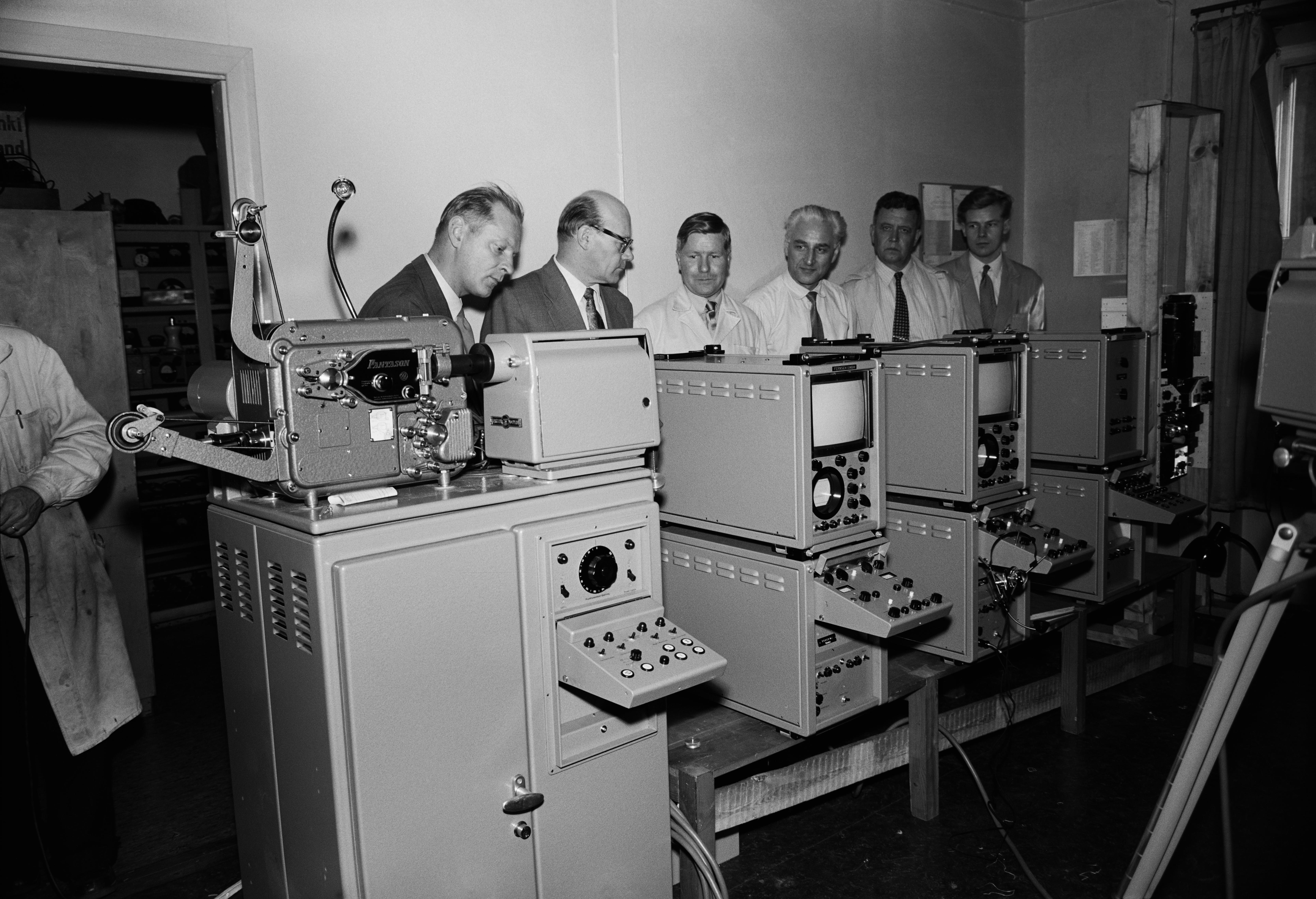
Fernseh GmbH Telecine with a Pantason 16 mm film projector in 1956

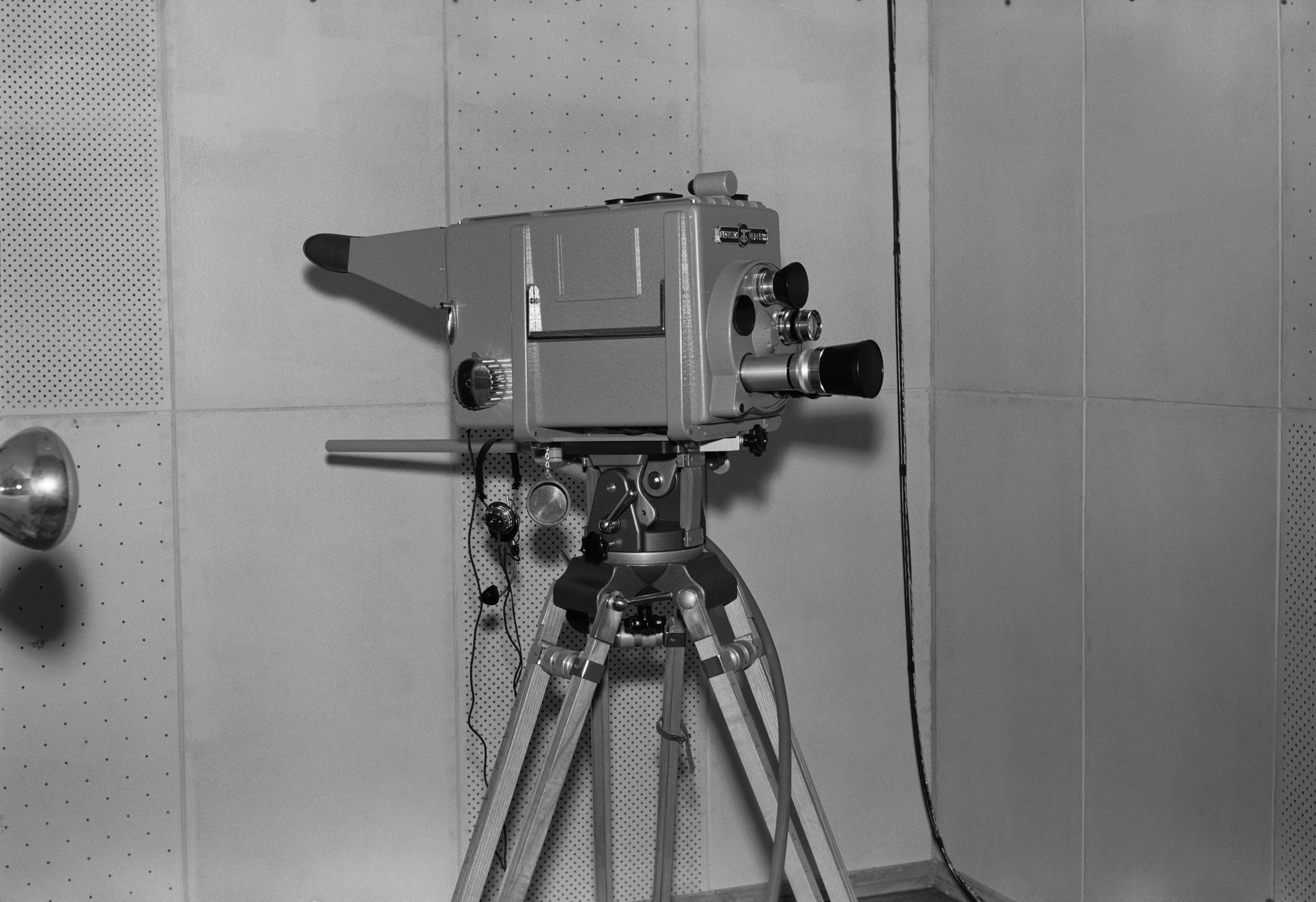
Orthikon Camera in 1957

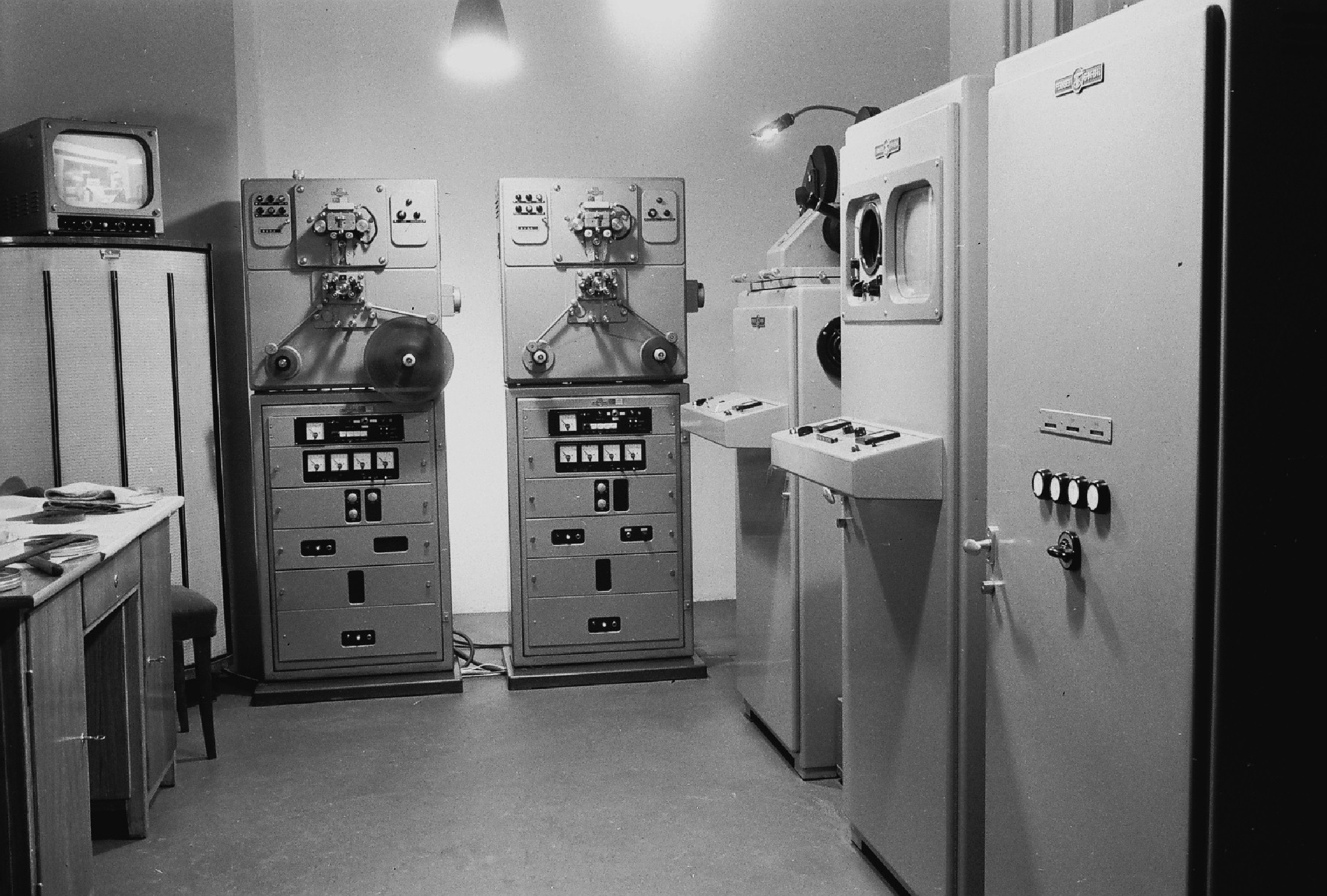
Fernseh GmbH TV recorder at MTV Studio in 1958 in Budapest

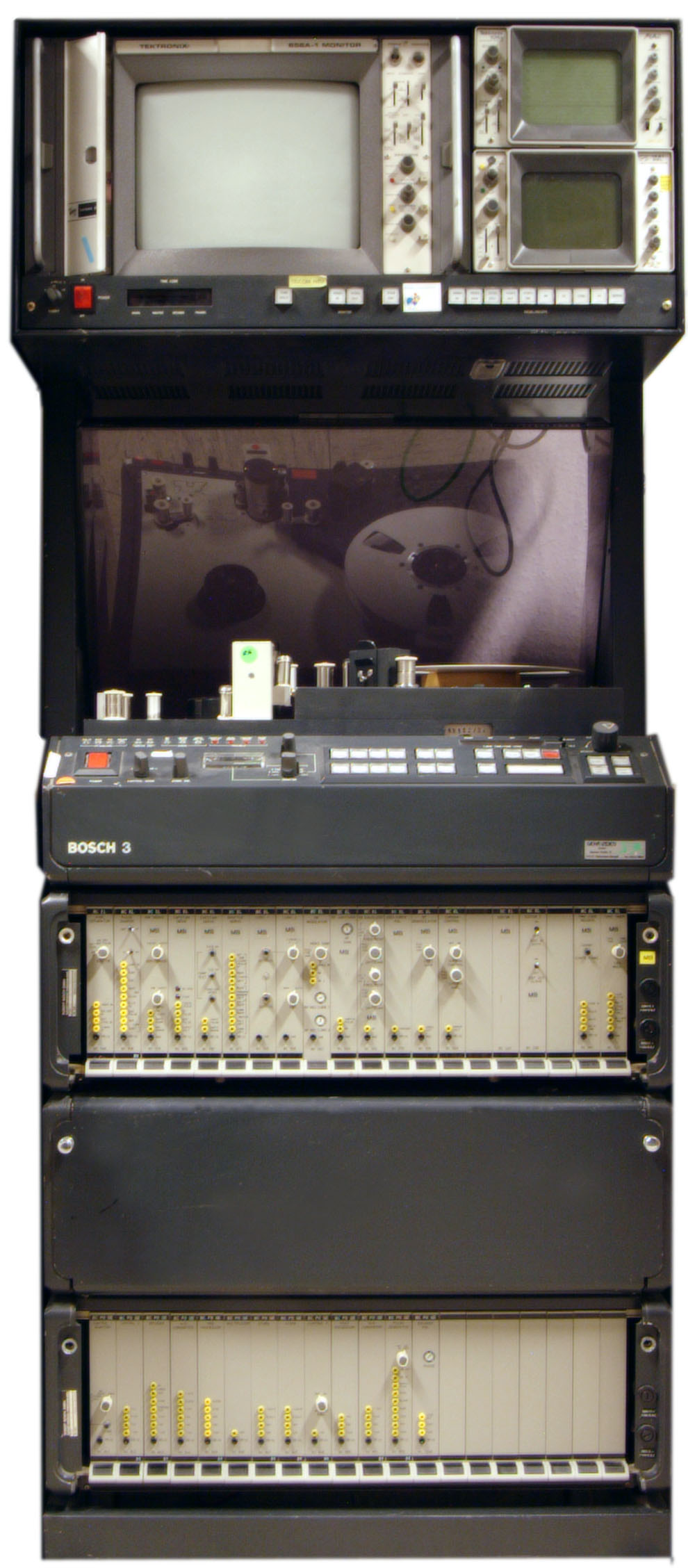
BCN 51 Fernseh VTR

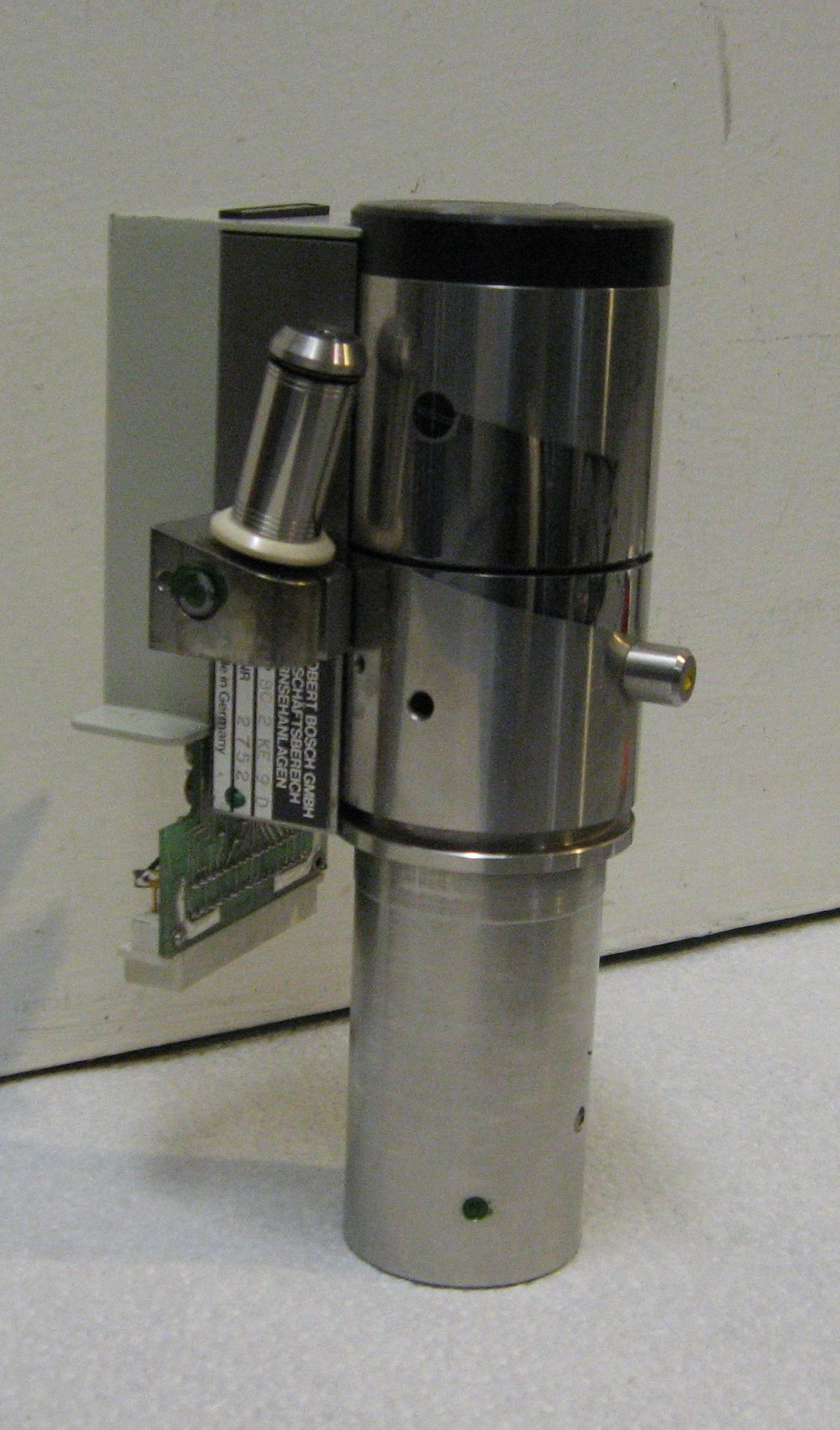
Type B video Scanner Head from DC Video,

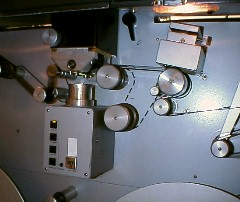
Bosch Fernseh FDL 60 Telecine Film Deck and Lens Gate

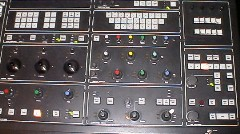
FRP 60 Control Panel, Bosch Fernesh

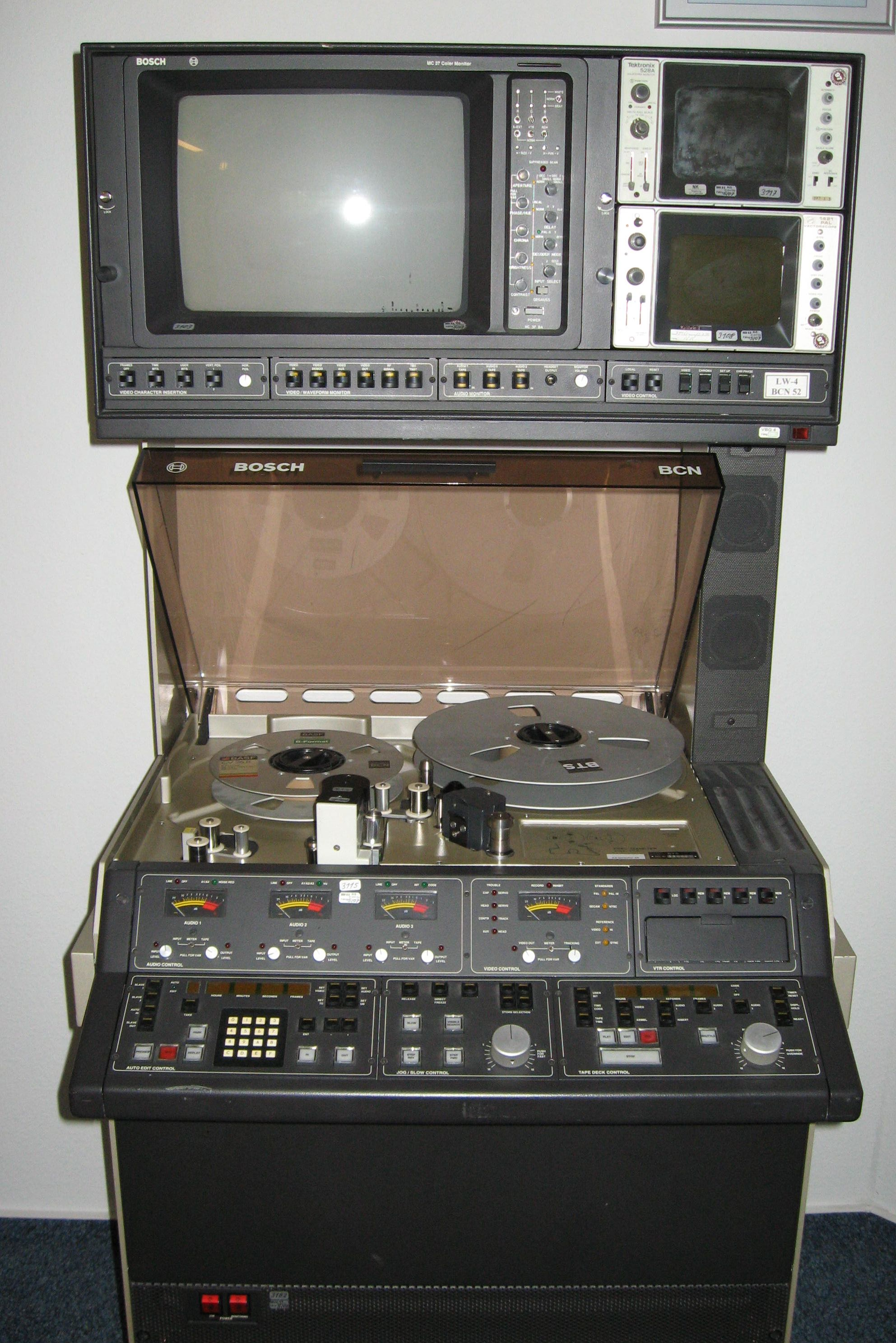
BCN 52 VTR

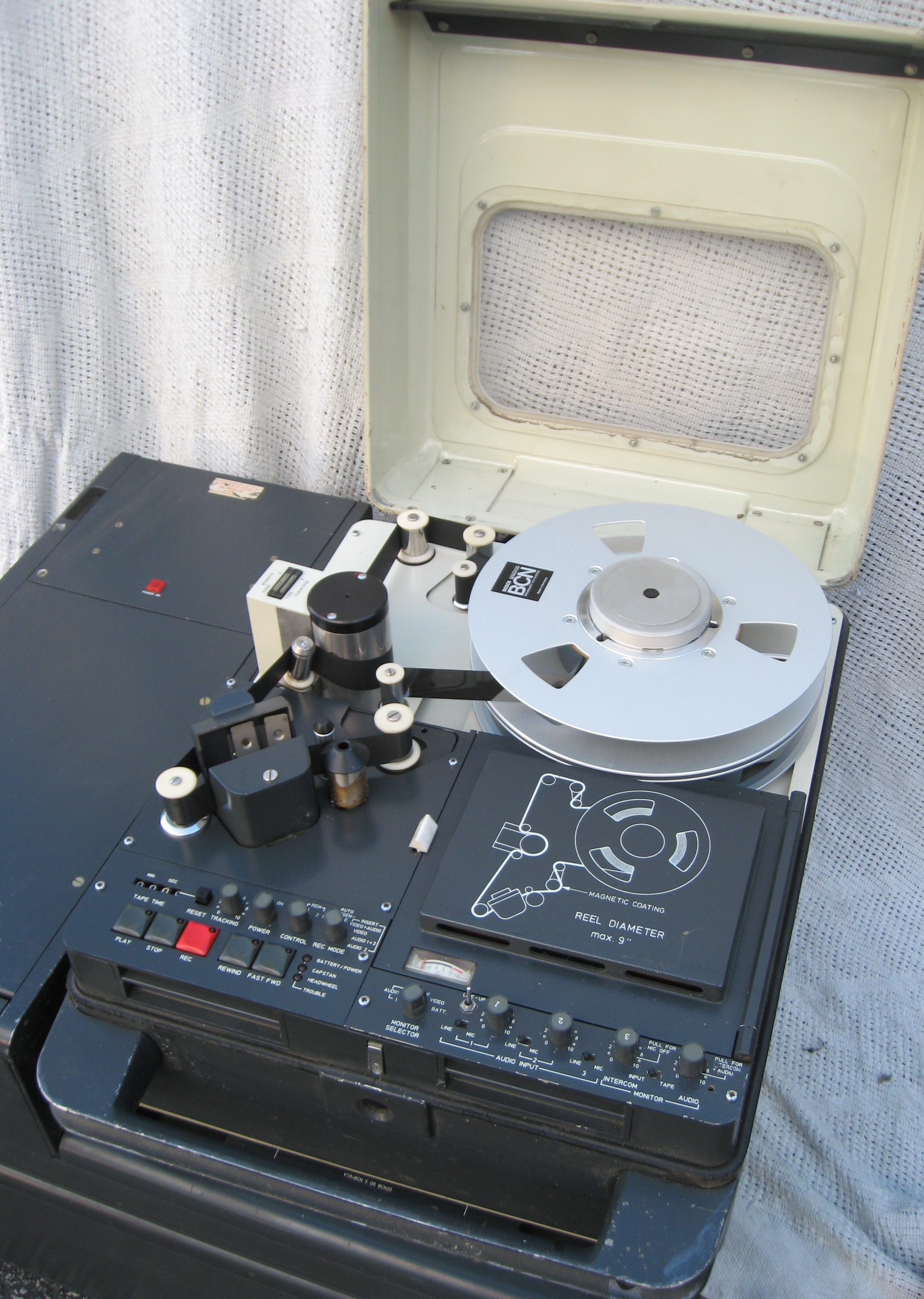
BCN 20 VTR with "L unit" playback with TBC.

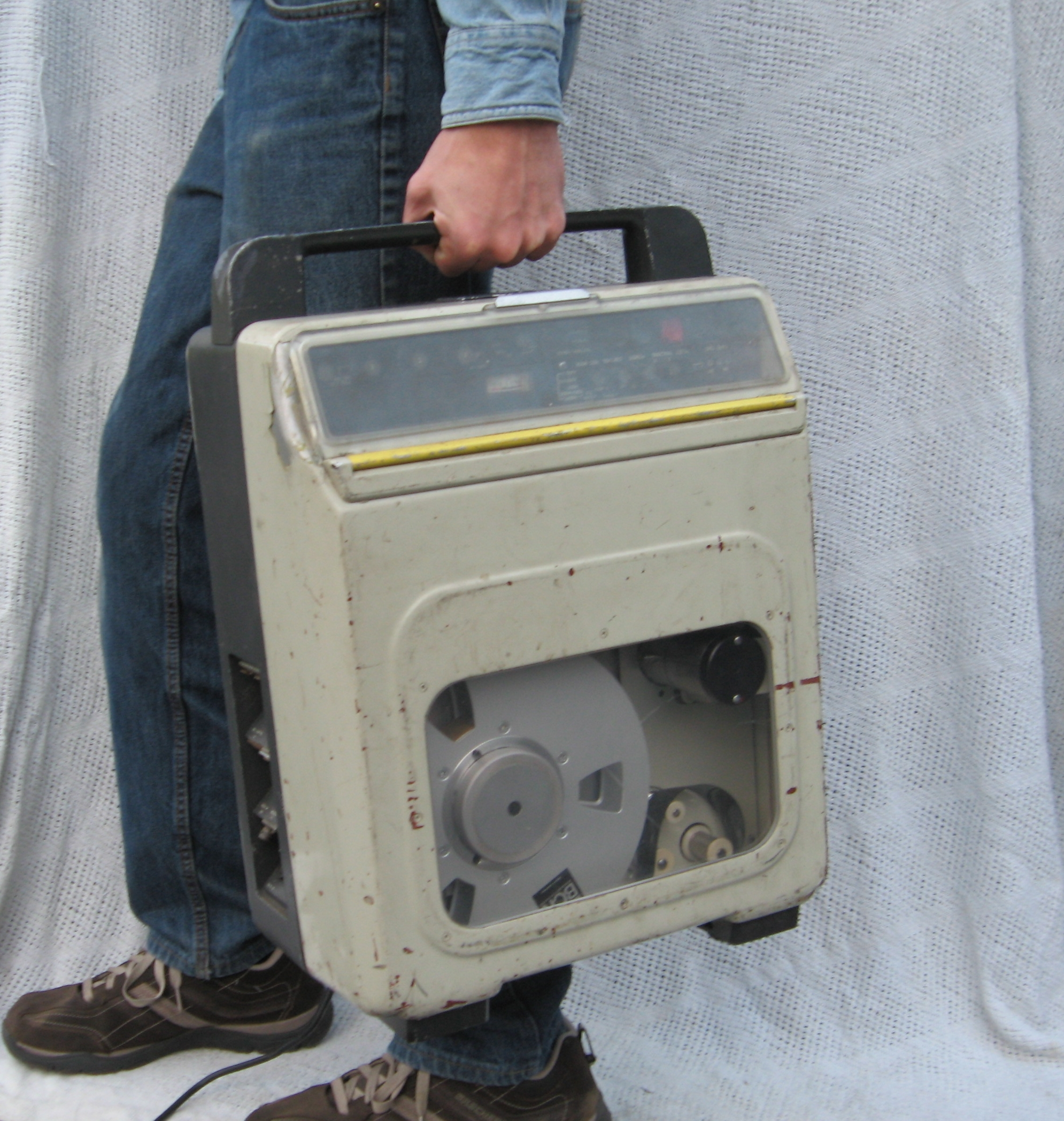
BCN 20 VTR hand held VTR recorder.

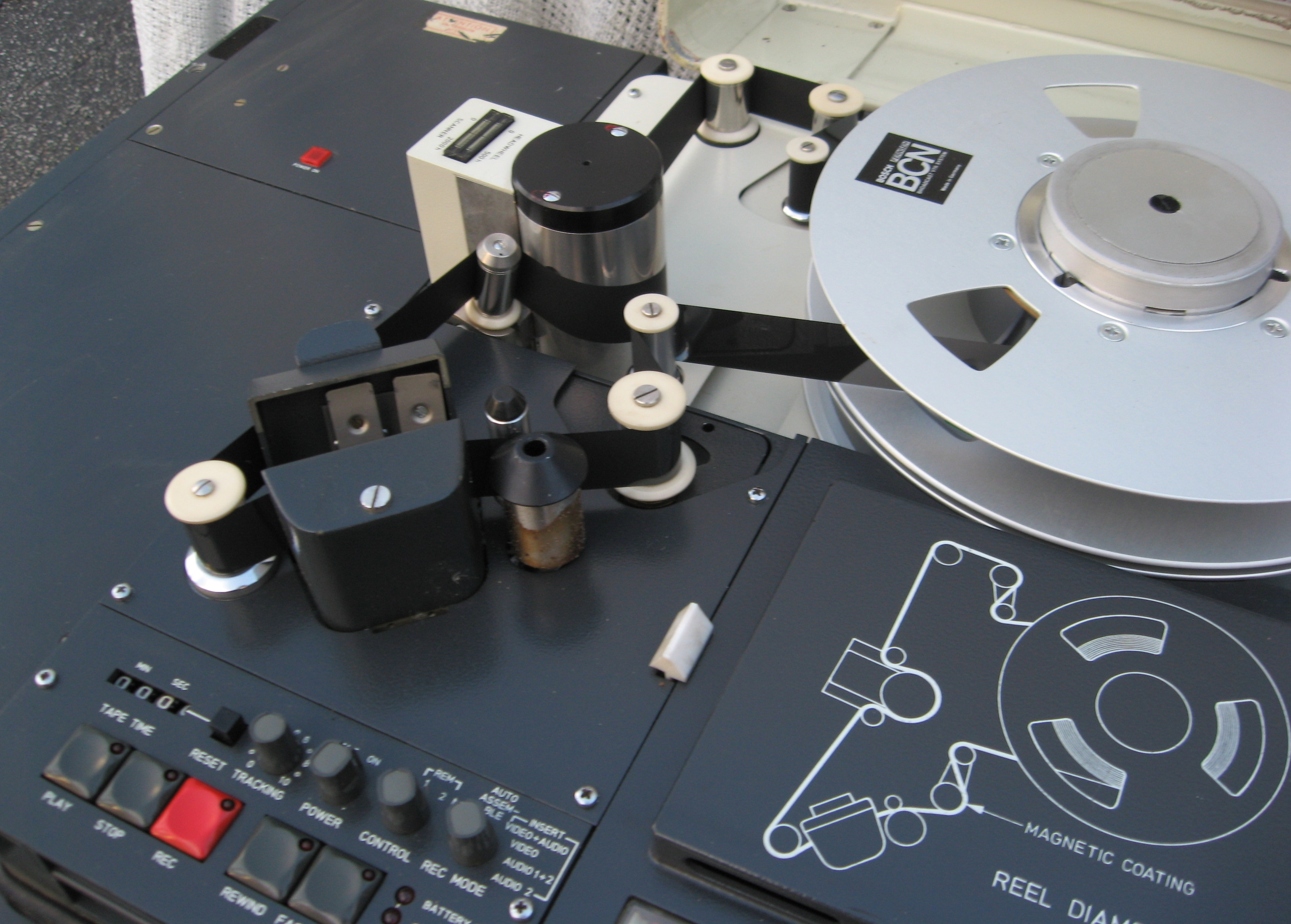
BCN 20 VTR deck

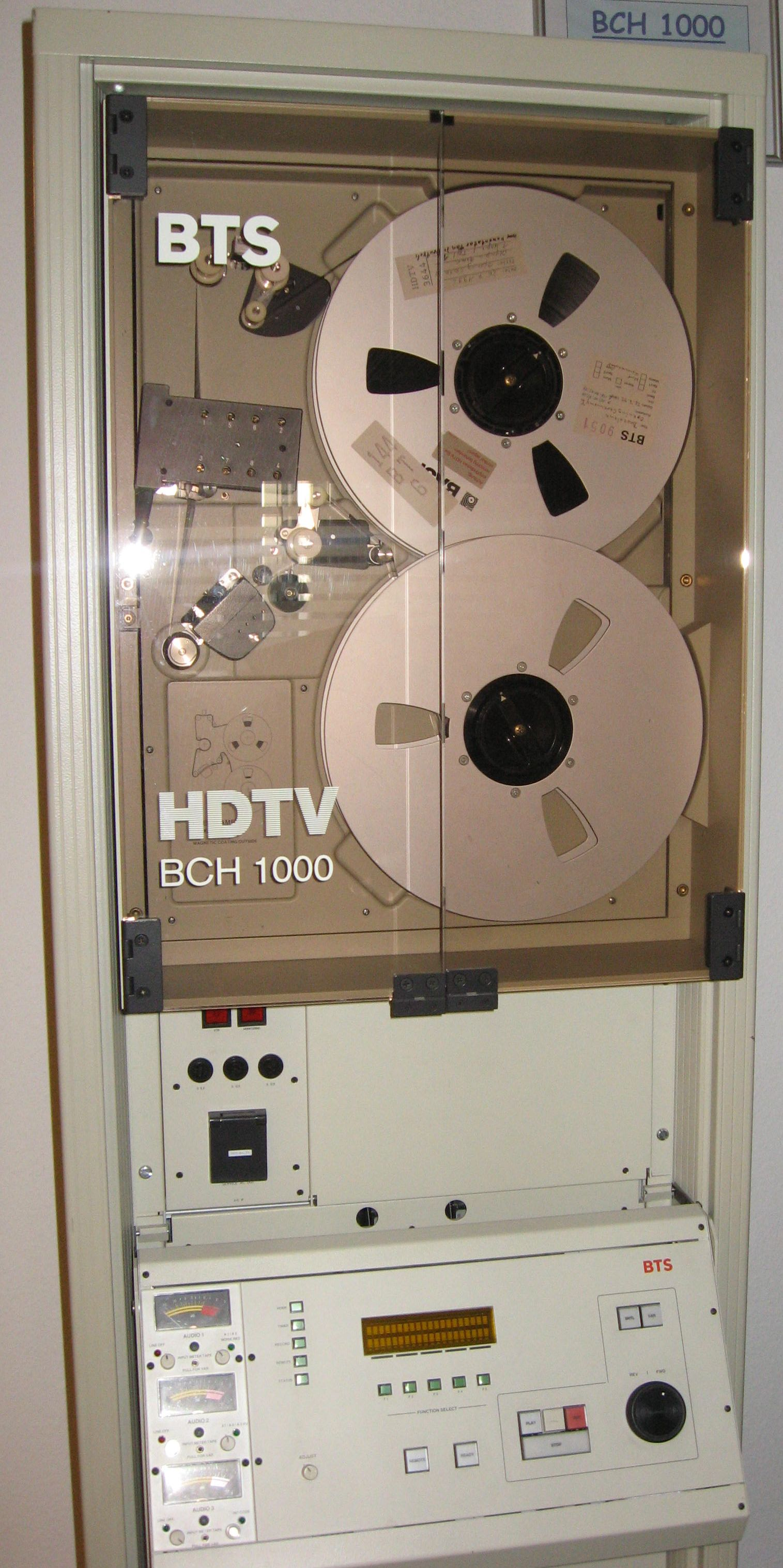
BCH-1000 HDTV B VTR

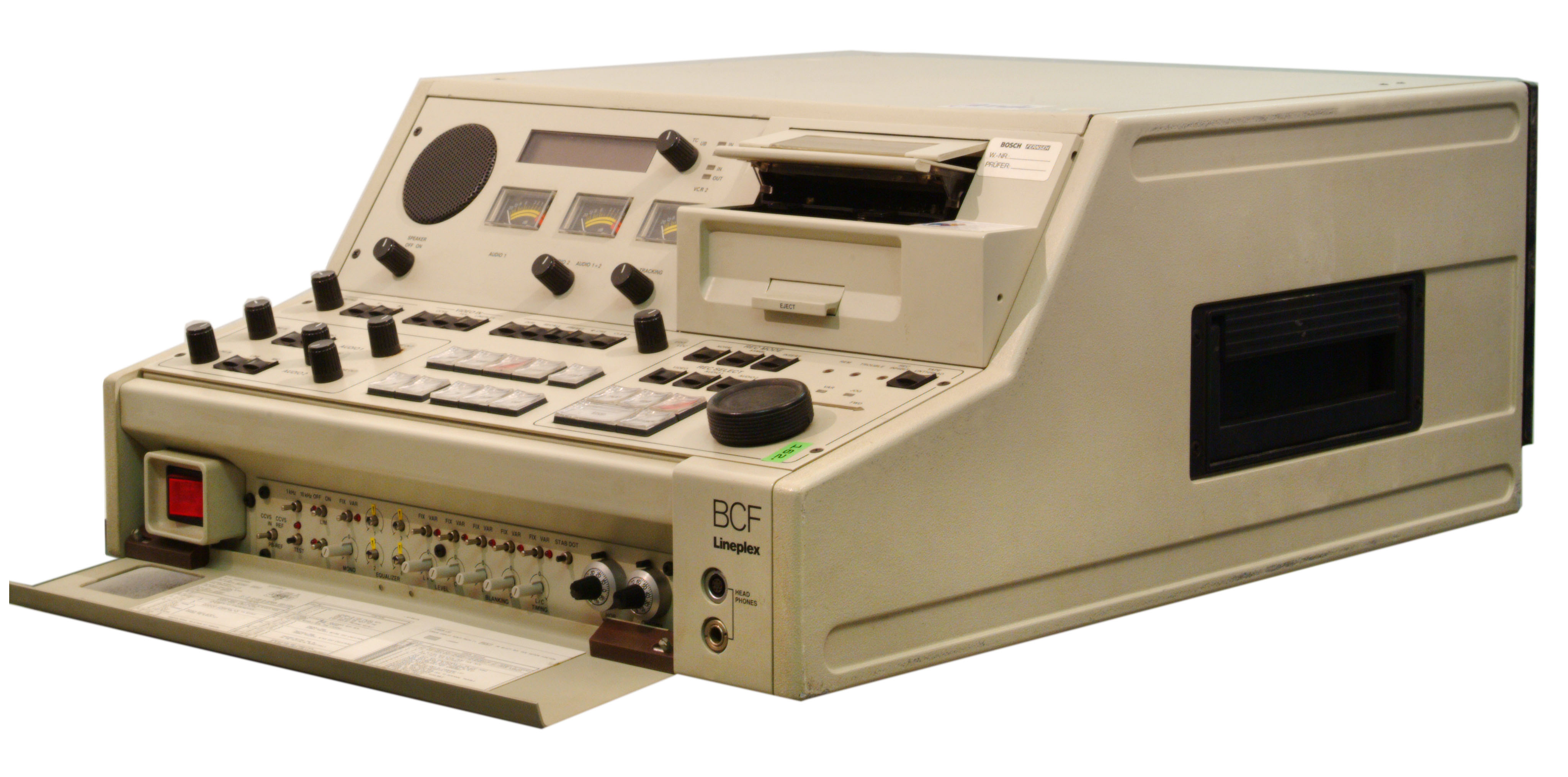
QUATERCAM BCF studio VTR (Lineplex system)

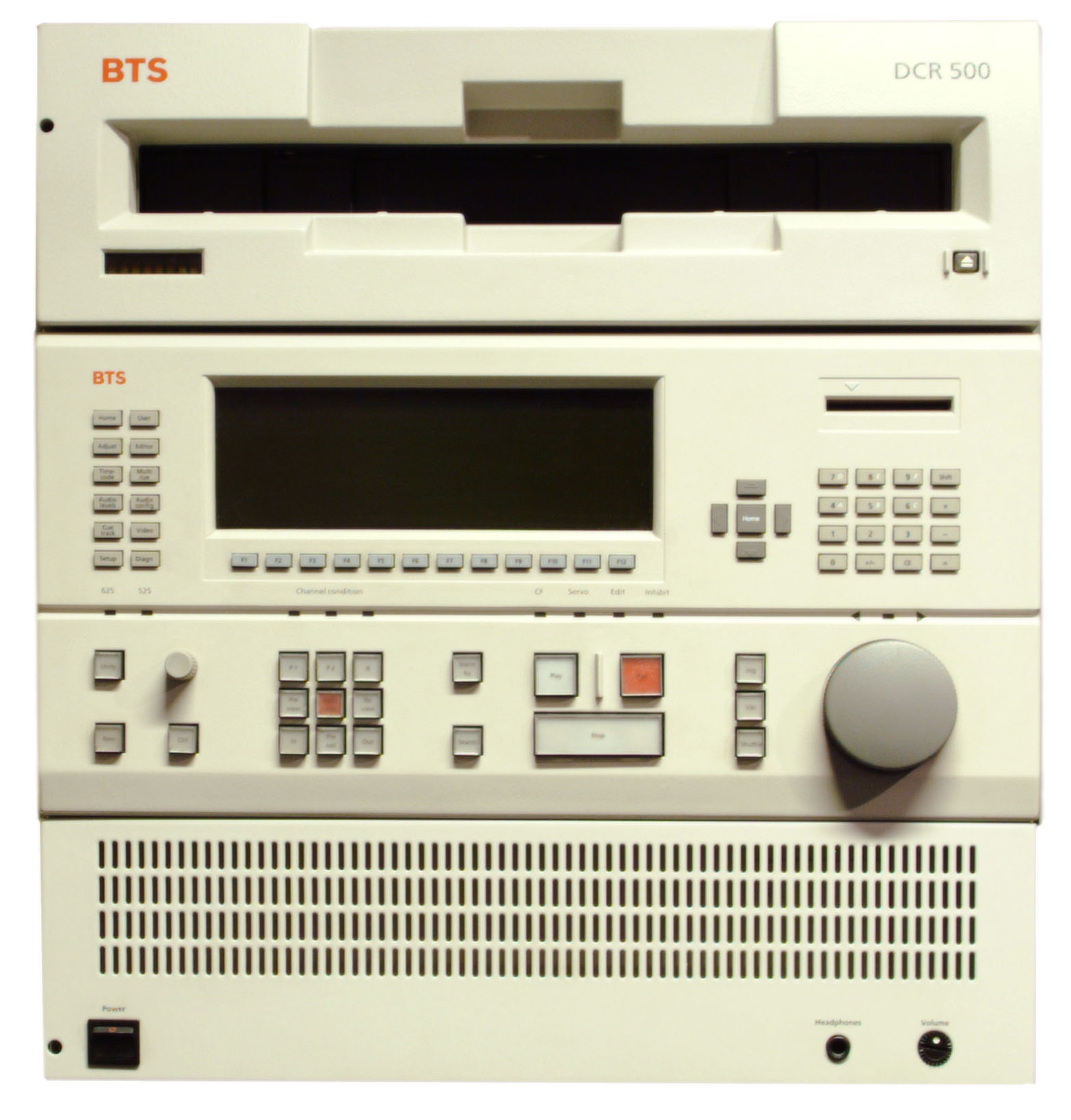
D1 DCR 500 VTR

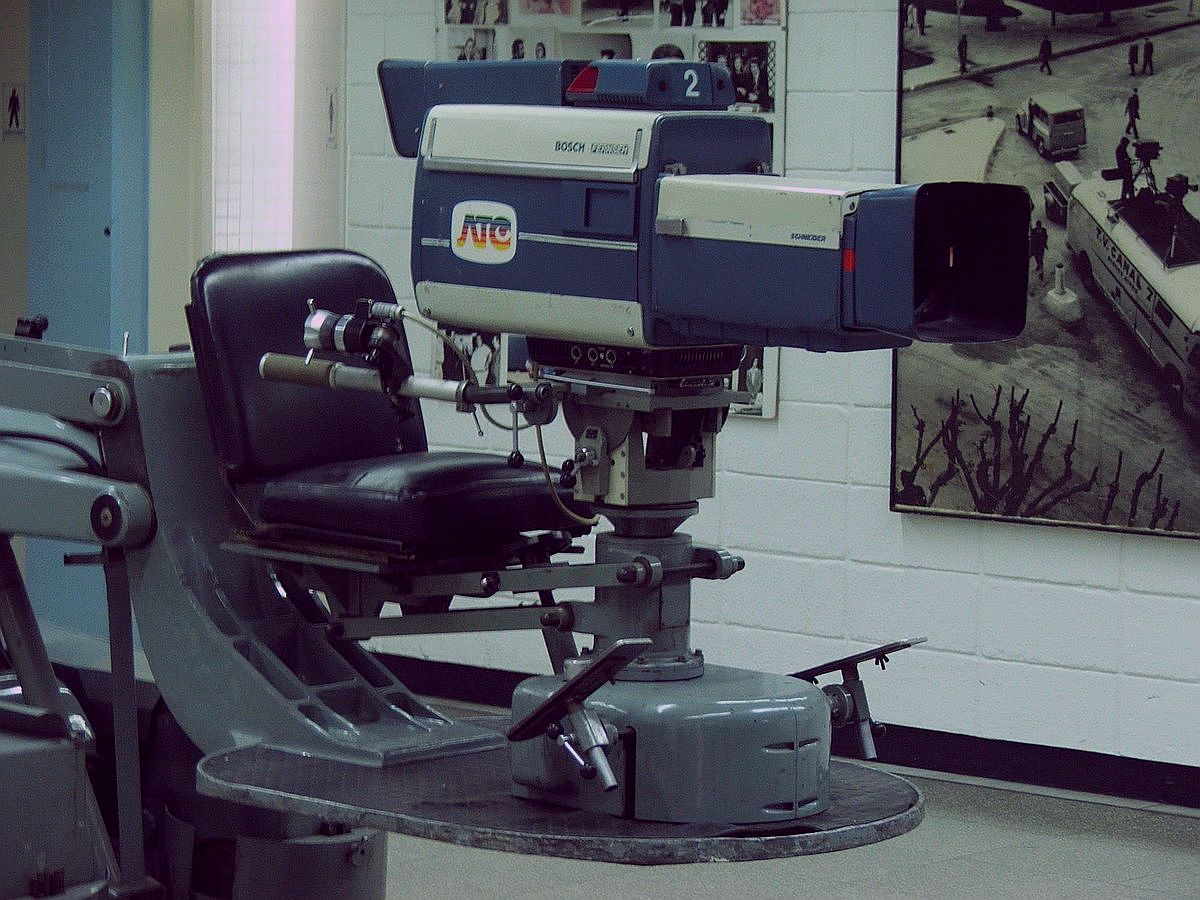
BOSCH KCK-40

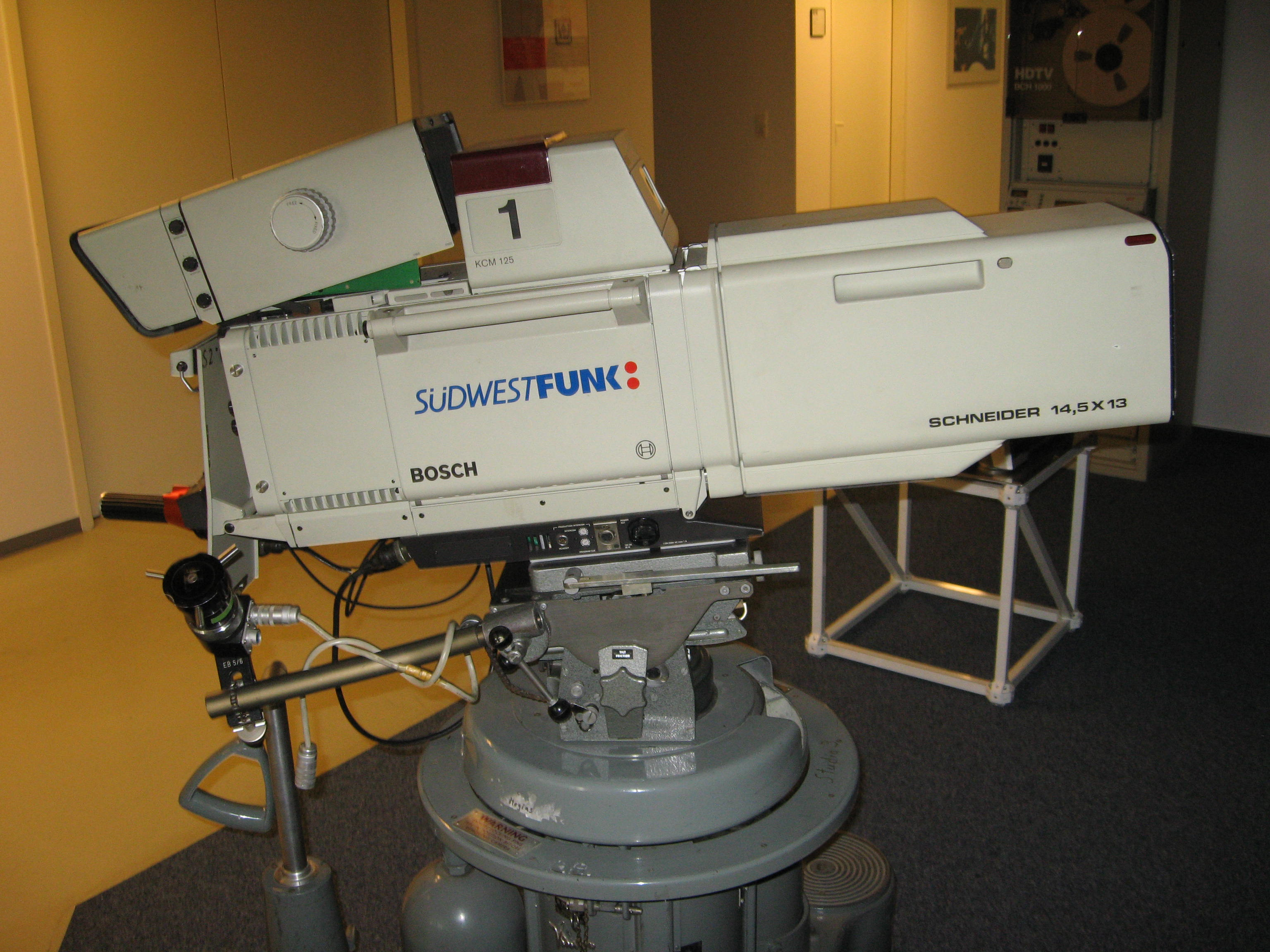
KCM-125 SDTV camera with a Schneider Optics Lens

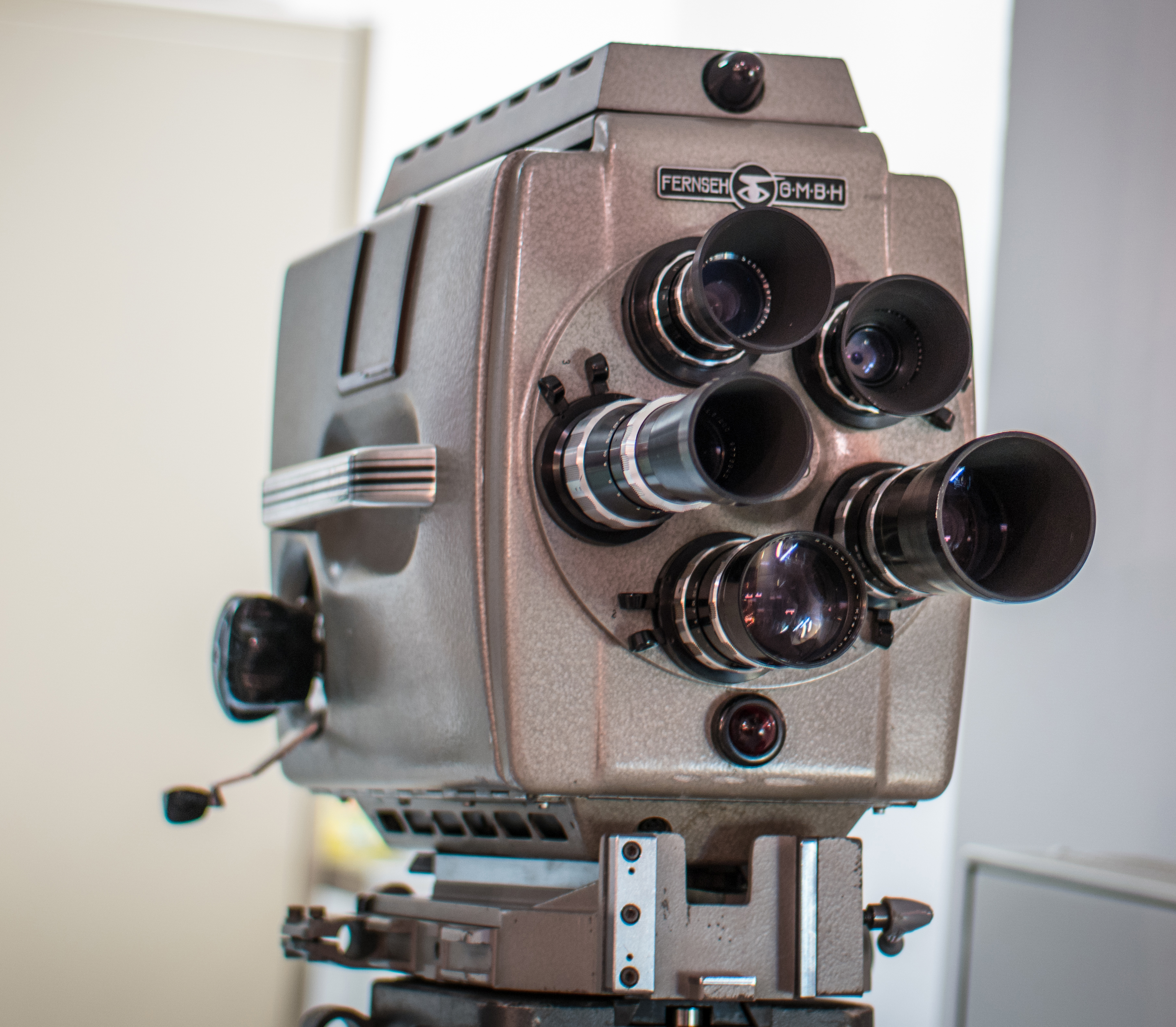
KOD 3 television studio camera from 1958 in the Museum Hamburg

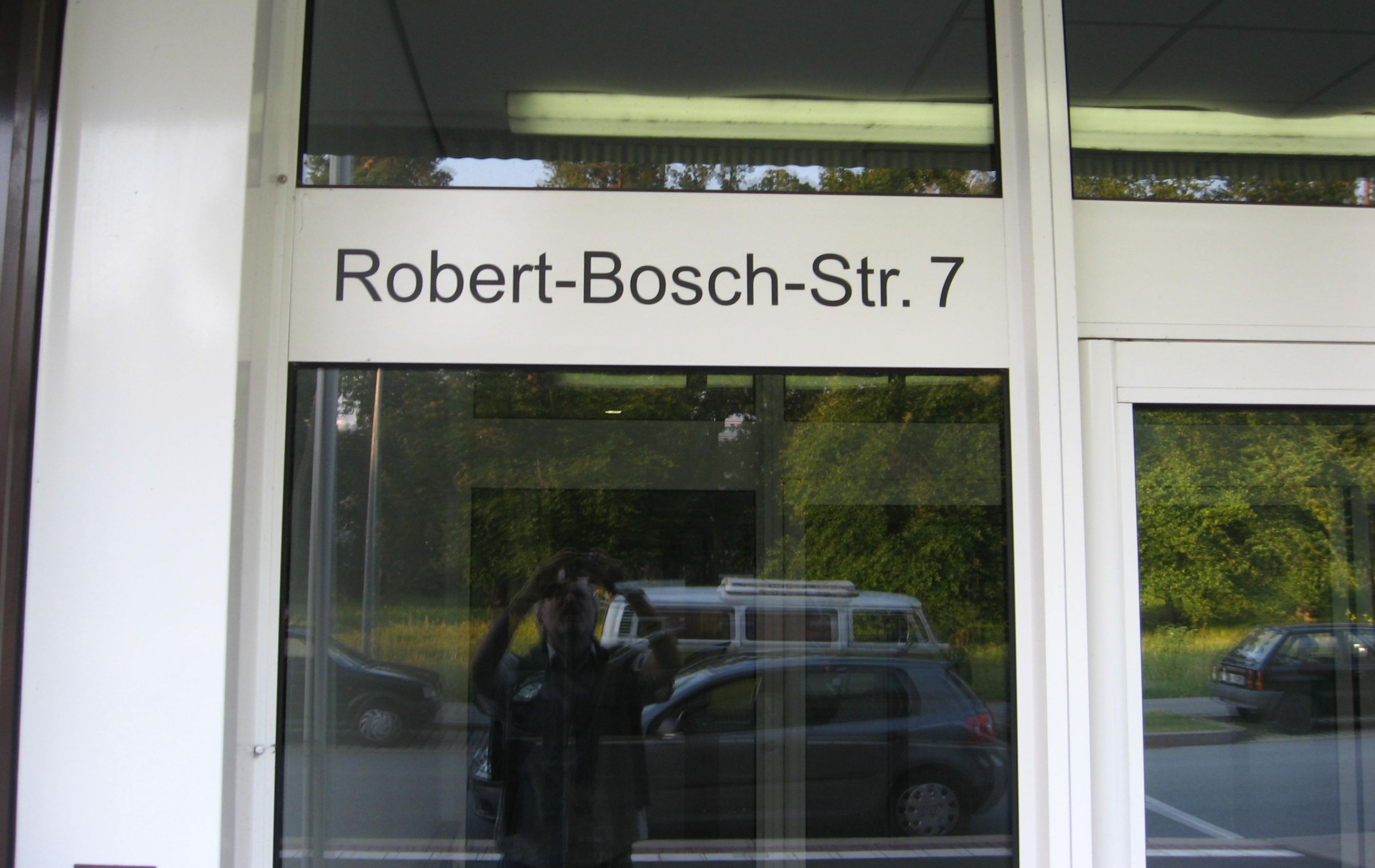
Bosch Fernseh HQ_Darmstadt, Germany

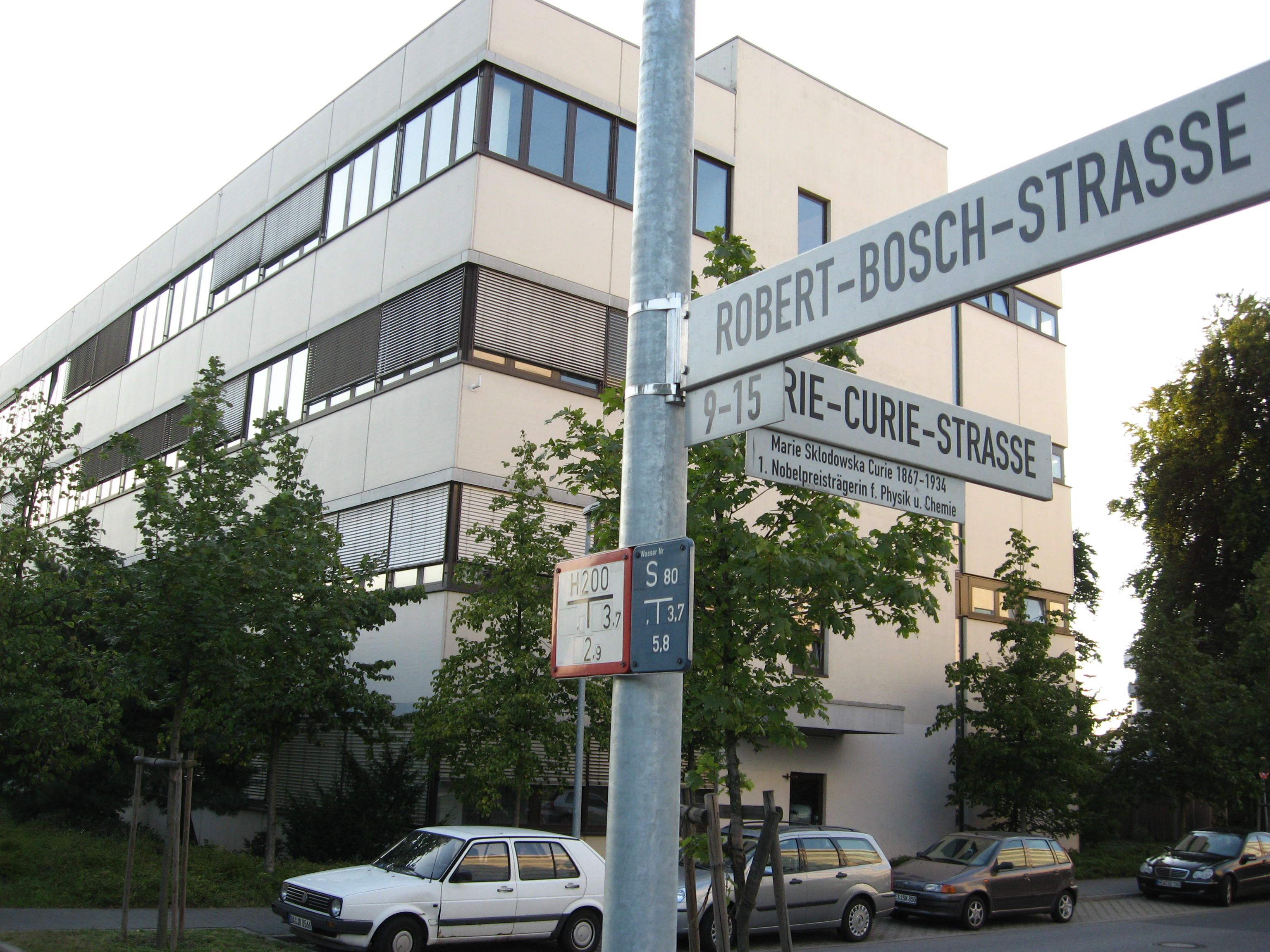
Bosch Fernseh HQ street sign Darmstadt Germany

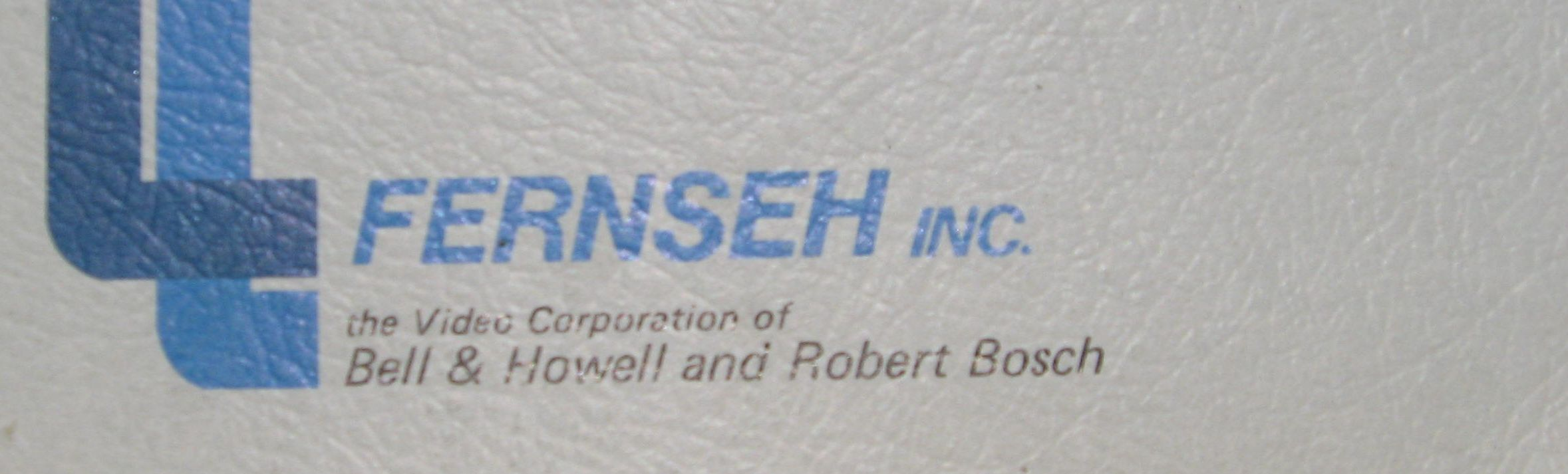
Fernseh Inc. Logo

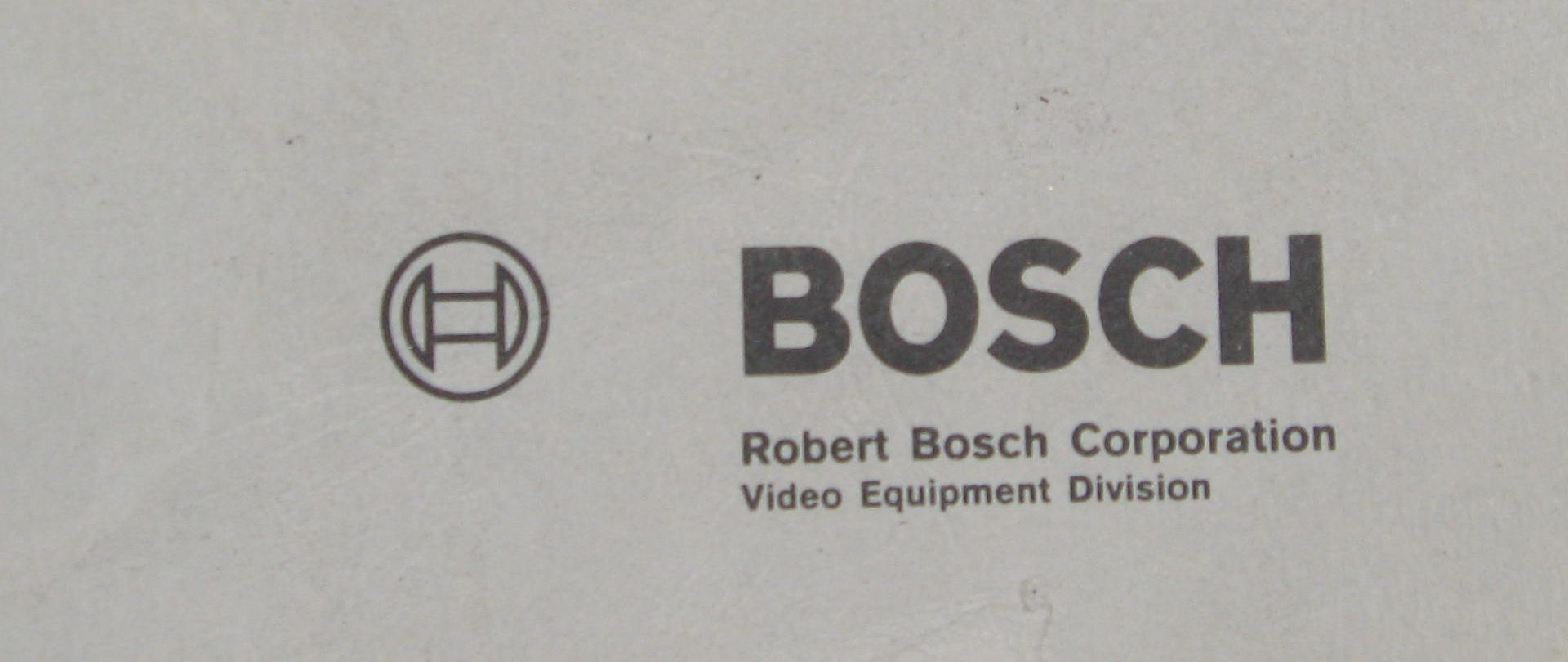
Bosch Video Corp. logo

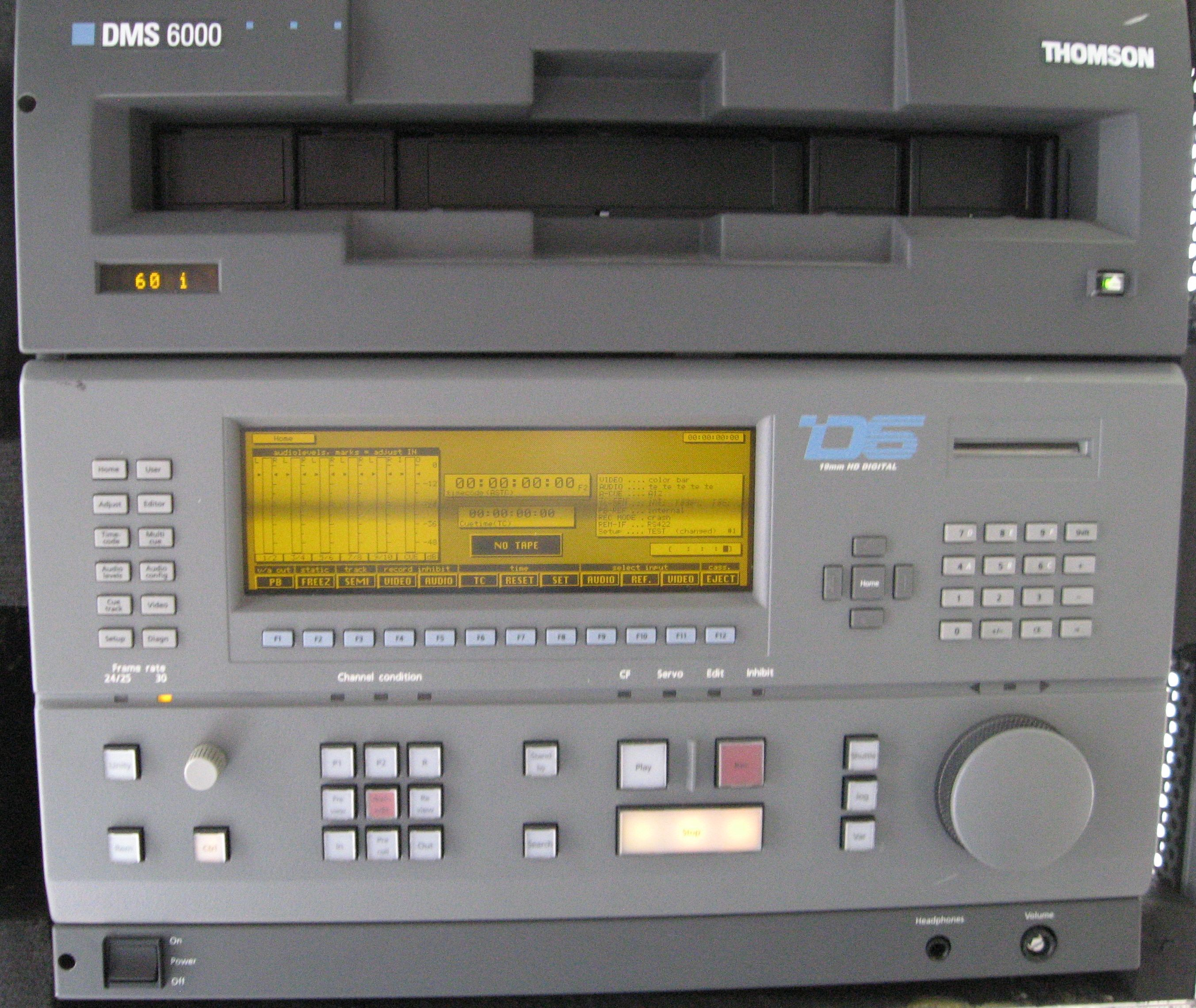
D6 VTR Tape Deck

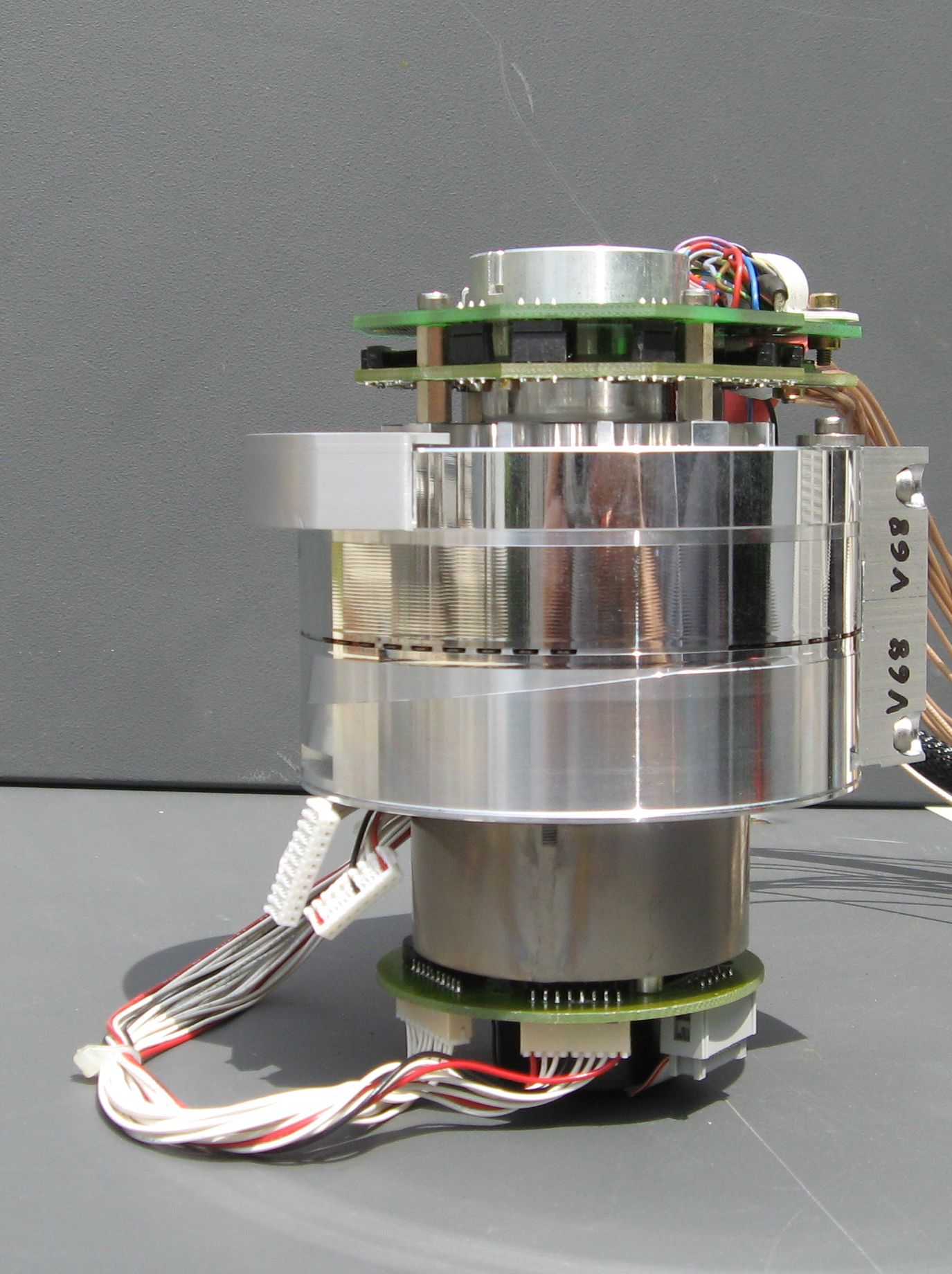
D6 VTR Scanner, removed

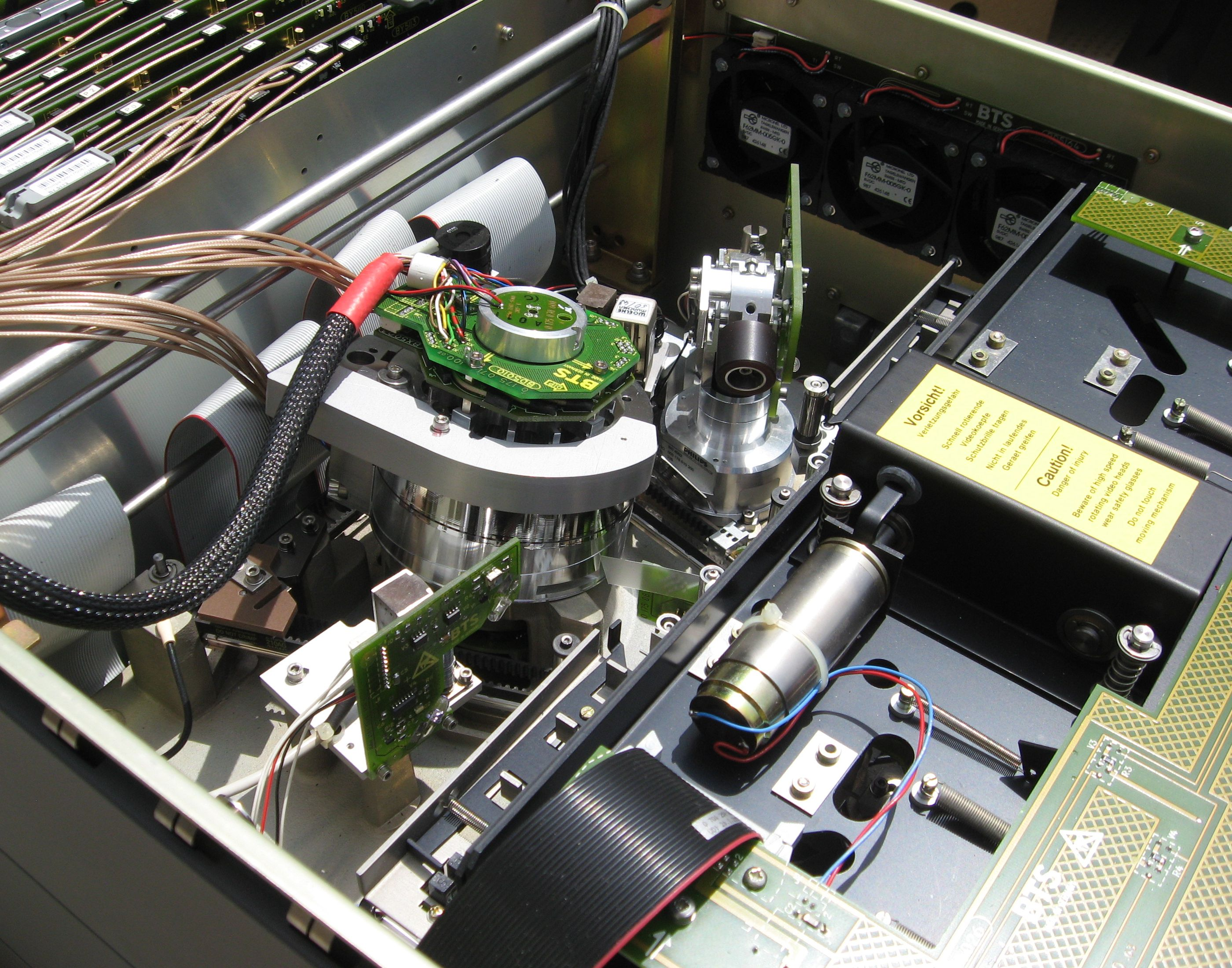
Inside a D6 VTR Tape Deck

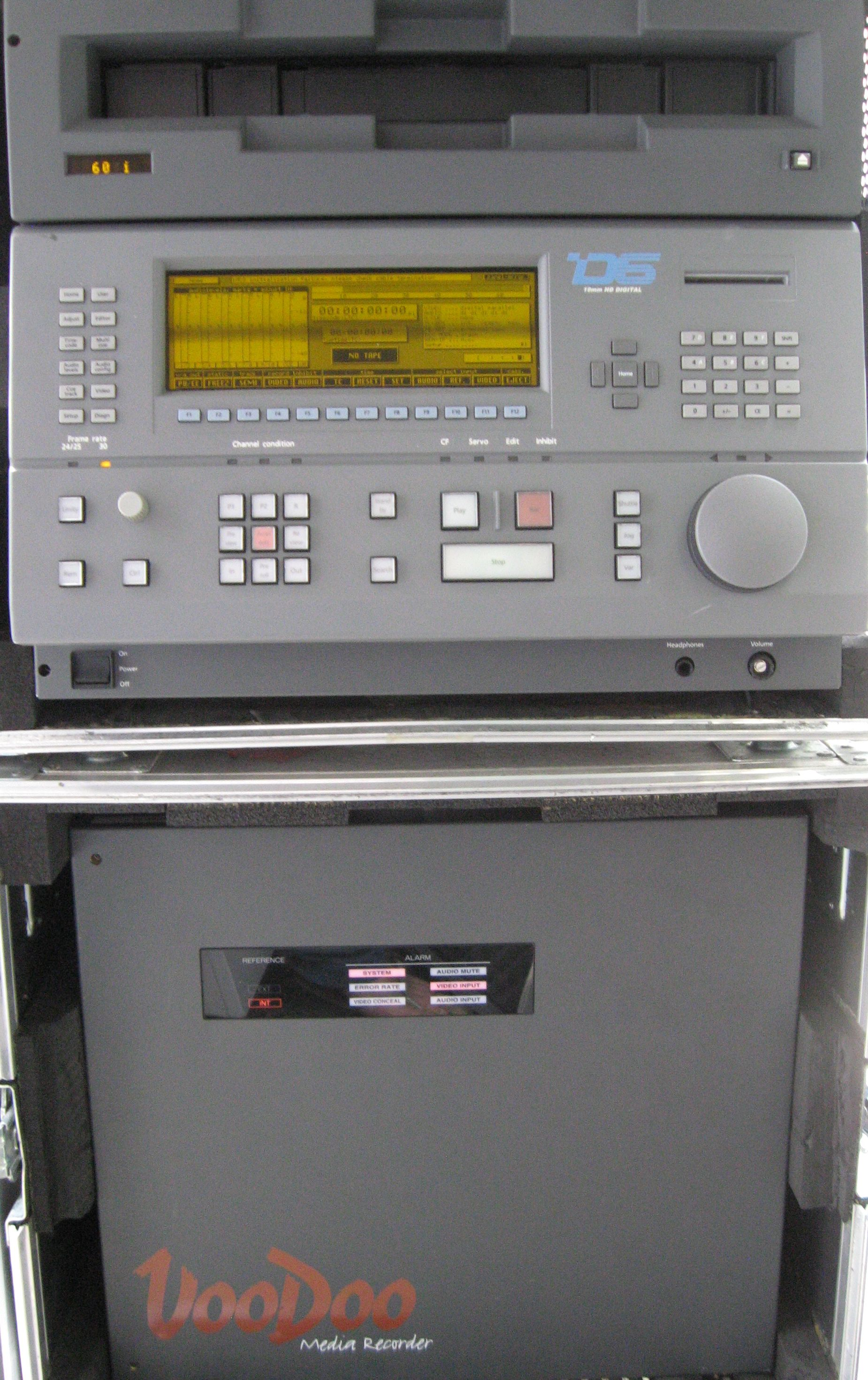
D6 VTR full unit

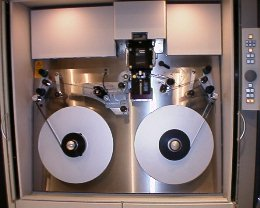
SDC-2000 Spirit DataCine Film Deck

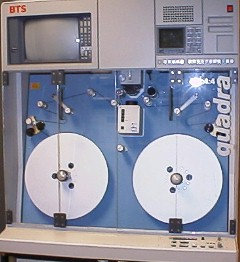
Quadra Telecine Film Deck

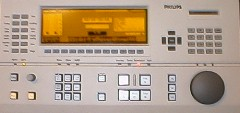
SDC-2000 Spirit DataCine Functional Control Panel-FCP

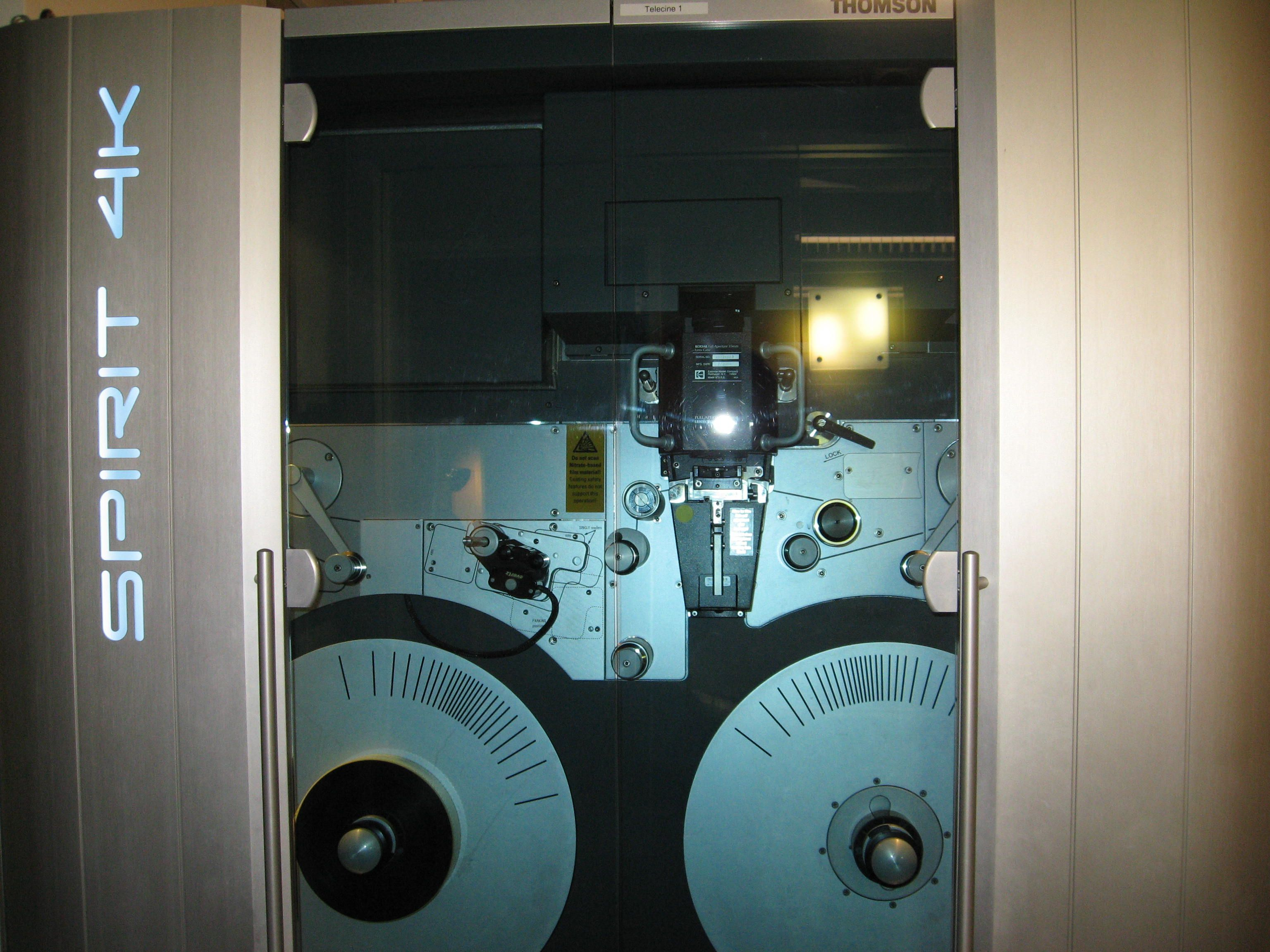
Spirit Datacine 4k with the doors closed

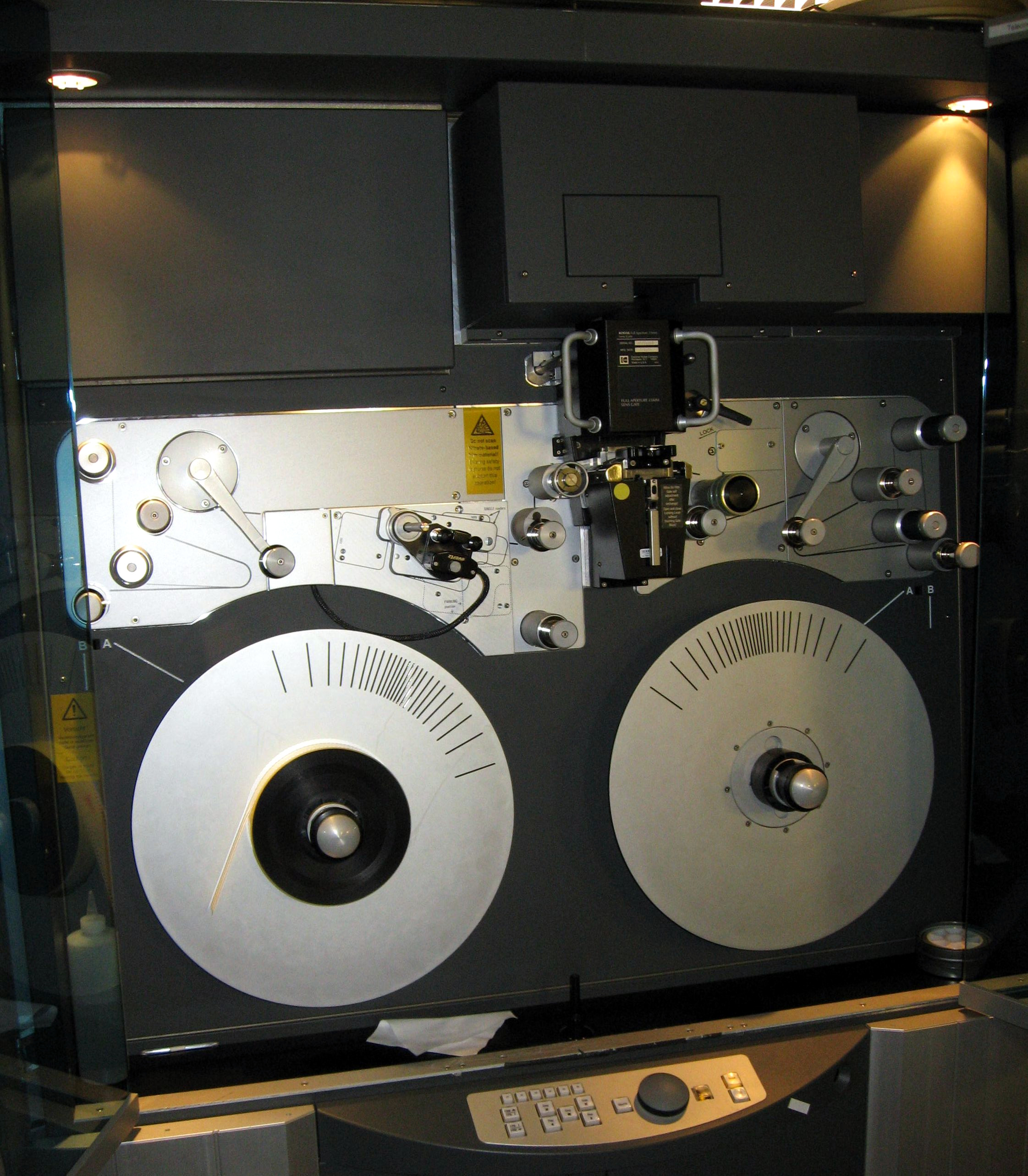
Spirit Datacine 4k with the doors open.jpg

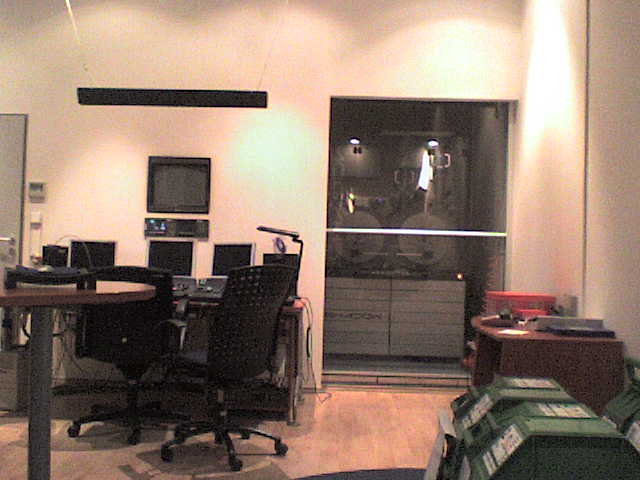
A Shadow Telecine in a color correction suite.

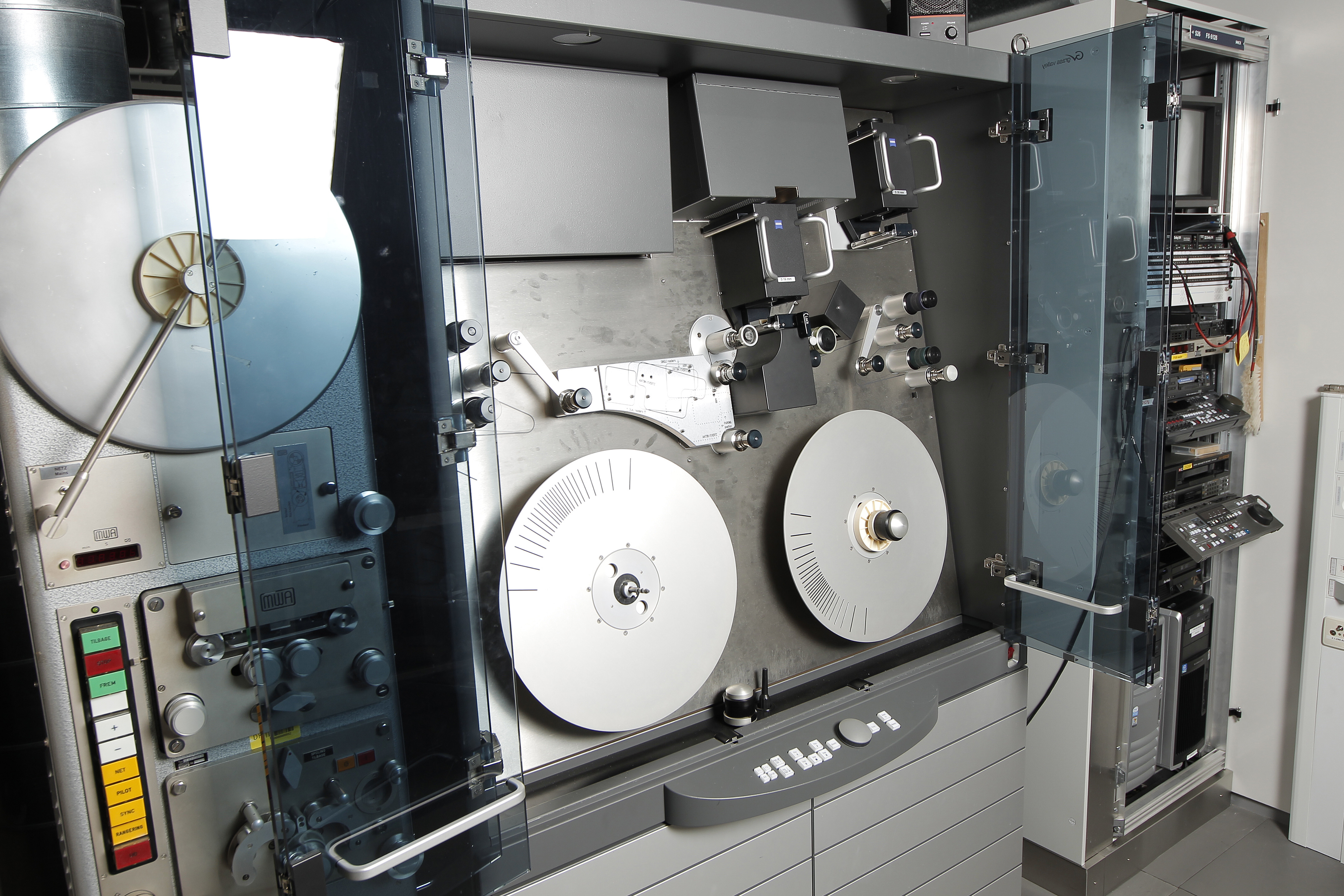
Shadow Telecine

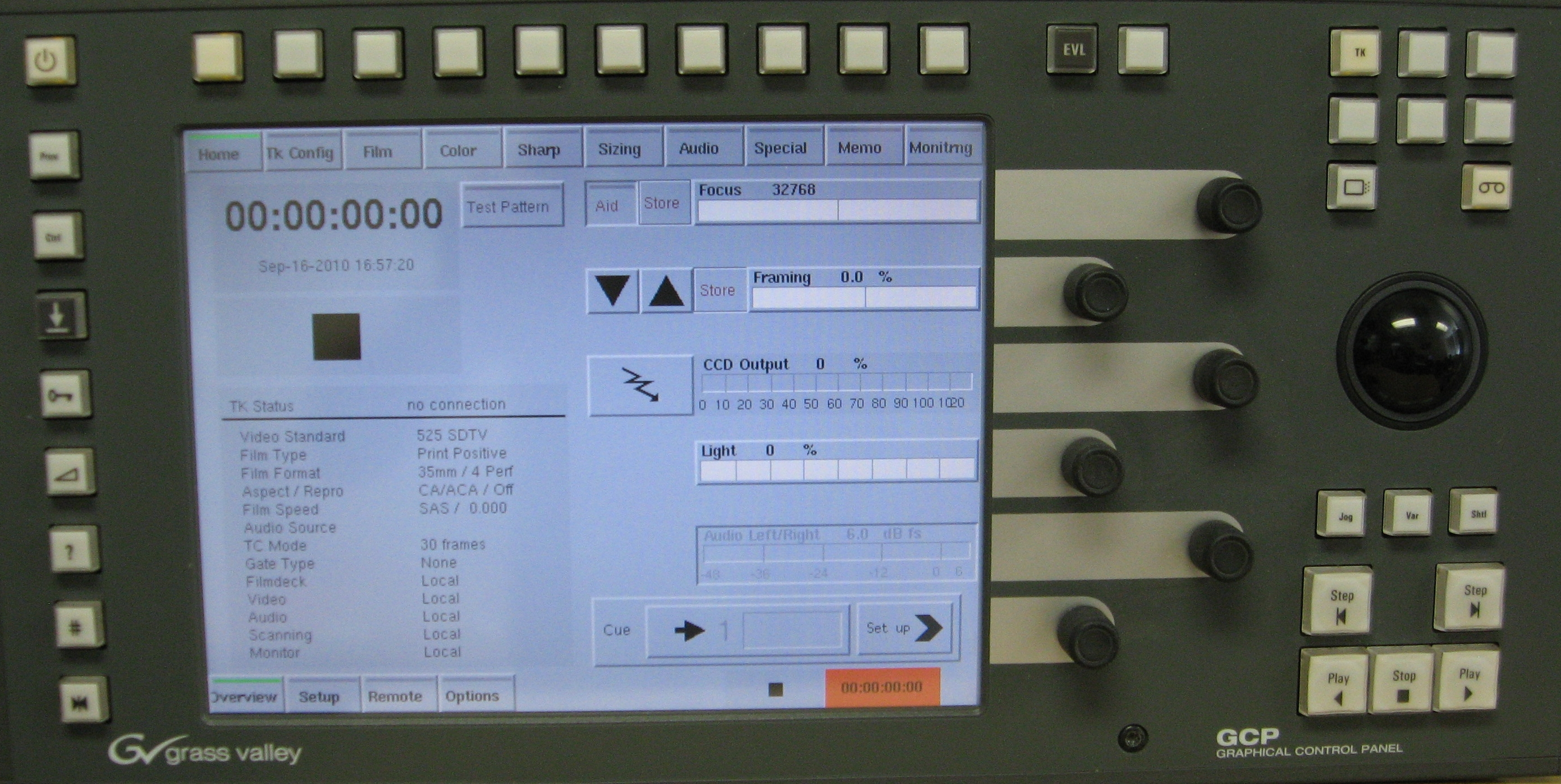
GCP for a Spirit Datacine

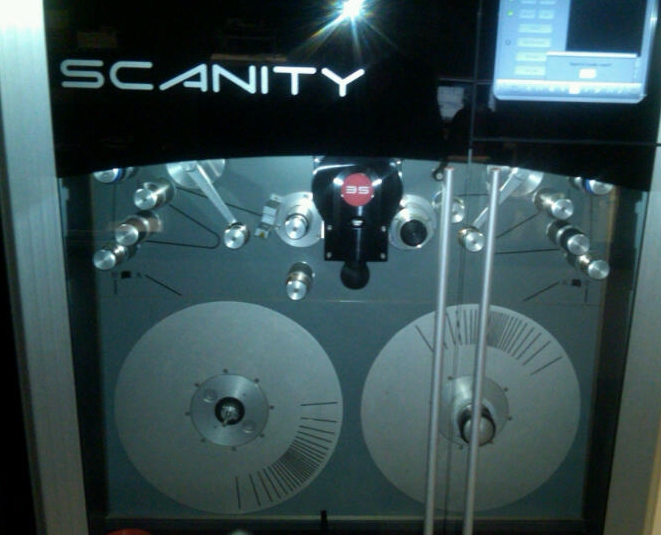
Scanity Film Deck

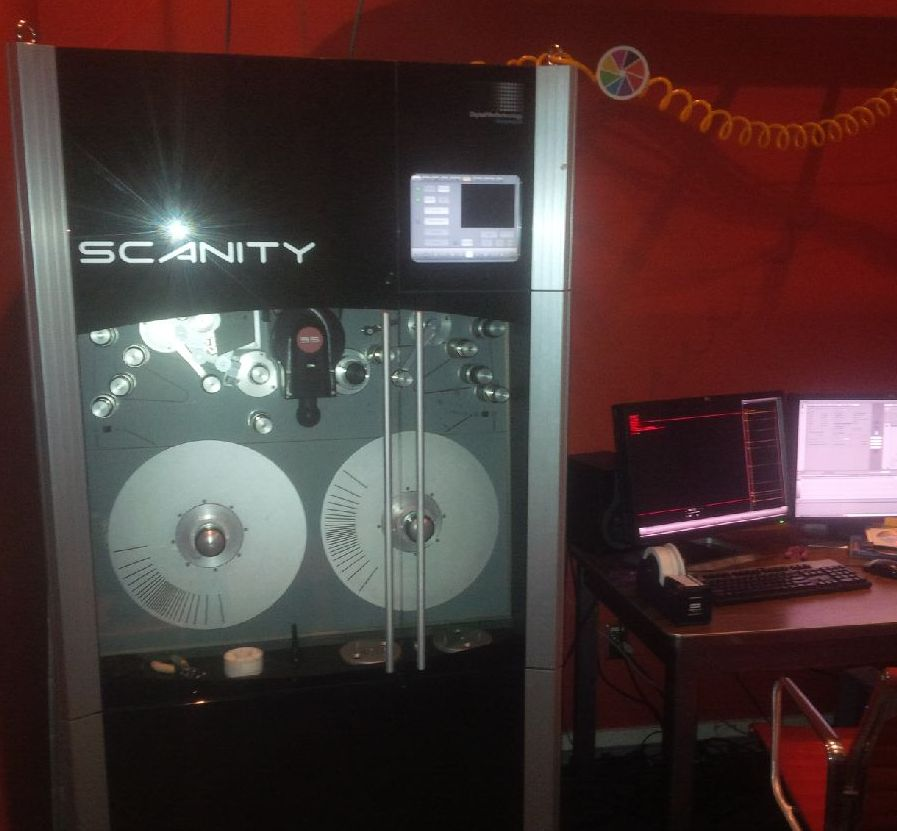
Cinelicious Scanity 4k and work station

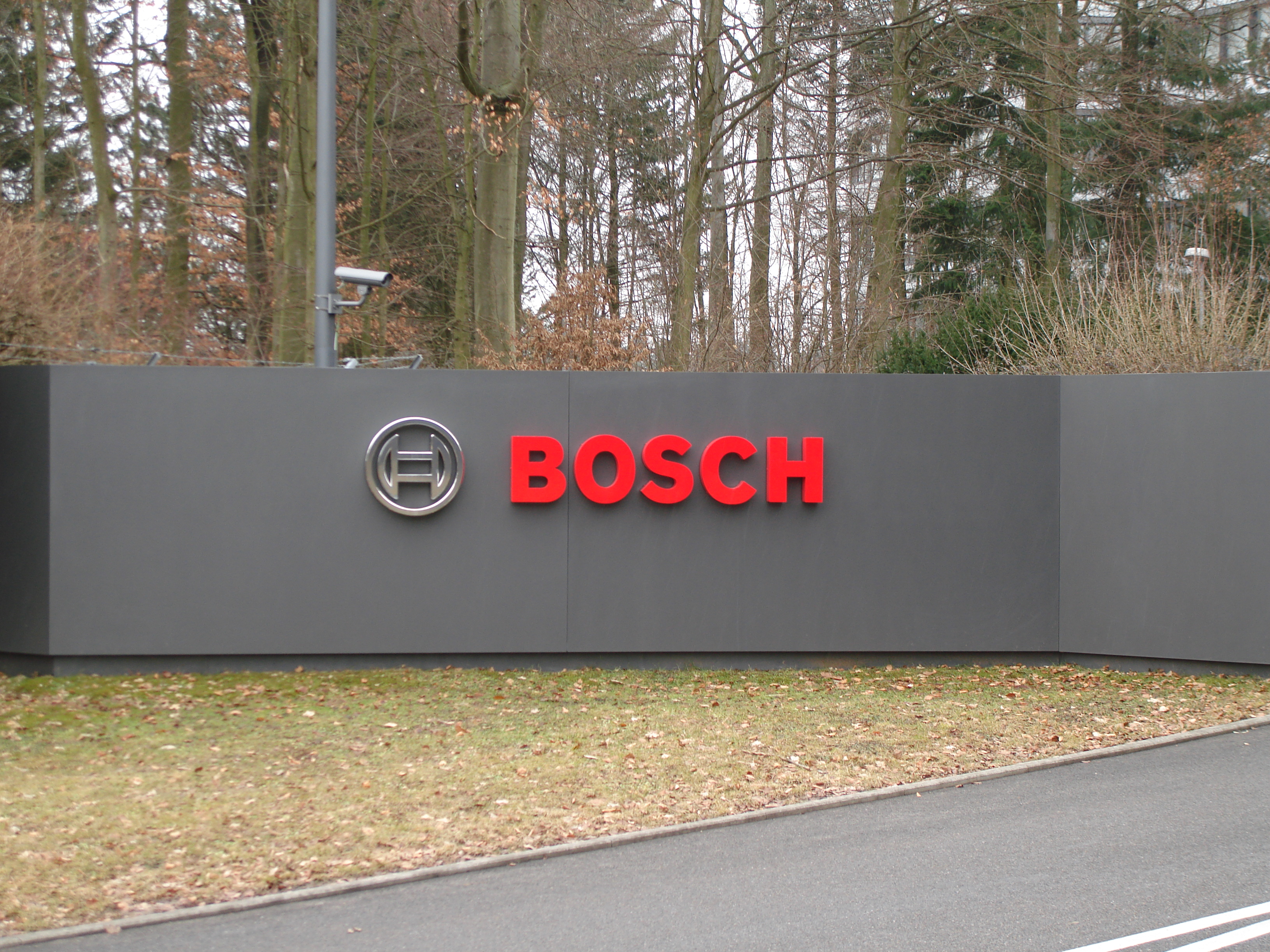
Bosch Logo

== Offices ==
Past and current offices in the cities of acquisitions (see History):

- Cergy, France (Thomson World Headquarters)
- Salt Lake City, Utah, United States - from TeleMation Inc -Bell and Howell
- Beaverton, Oregon, United States- from Tektronix
- Nevada City, California, United States — from Grassvalley Group
- Breda, Netherlands - from Philips - Norelco
- Weiterstadt - Darmstadt, Germany from Bosch Fernseh-(DFT),
- In 2013 DFT moved from Weiterstadt to Arheilgen-Darmstadt, Germany.

== See also ==
- Hans Walz
- Post-production
- Video camera
- Fernseh prefix:
  - Fernsehturm Berlin Television Tower.
  - Fernsehen, German word for "television".
  - Fernseh sprechstellen German Videotelephony.
  - Fernsehturm Stuttgart telecommunications tower in Stuttgart.
  - Fernsehsender Paul Nipkow first public television station in the world.
  - Fernsehturm (disambiguation) German word for television tower.
  - Fernsehen der DDR state television broadcaster in East Germany.
  - Fernsehturm Heidelberg Heidelberg transmission tower.
  - Fernsehturm Dresden-Wachwitz TV tower in Dresden.
  - Fernsehserien German for TV series which comprises several episodes.
  - ZDF Fernsehgarten "ZDF Television garden" is a German entertainment show.
  - Deutscher Fernseh-Rundfunk Early German Television Broadcasting
  - Fernsehproduktion a television production.
  - Fernsehnorm TV standard.
  - Fernsehpitaval Crime TV show from 1958 to 1978 on GDR.
