= Intermediate film system =

This system was used principally in Britain and German

Conceptual Intermediate film system for Remote Truck (1934), 1 - movie camera; 2 - film processor; 3 - washing bath; 4 - film drying compartment; 5 - telecine; 6 - monitor; 7 - video output; 8 - sewage; 9 - plumbing.

The intermediate film system was a television process in which motion picture film was processed almost immediately after it was exposed in a camera, then scanned by a television scanner, and transmitted over the air. This system was used principally in Britain and Germany where television cameras were not sensitive enough to use reflected light, but could transmit a suitable image when a bright light was shone through motion picture film directly into the camera lens.

== History ==
John Logie Baird began developing the process in 1932, borrowing the idea of Georg Oskar Schubert from his licensees in Germany, where it was demonstrated by Fernseh AG in 1932 and used for broadcasting in 1934. The BBC used Baird's version of the process during the first three months of its then-"high-definition" television service from November 1936 through January 1937, and German television used it during broadcasts of the 1936 Summer Olympics. In both cases, intermediate film cameras alternated with newly introduced direct television cameras.

The exposed film, either 35mm or 17.5mm (35mm split in half, to save expense), travelled in a continuous band from the camera, usually atop a remote broadcast vehicle, into a machine that developed and fixed the image. The film was then run through a flying spot scanner (so called because it moved a focused beam of light back and forth across the image), and electronically converted from a negative to a positive image. Depending on the equipment, the time from camera to scanner could be a minute or less. An optical soundtrack was recorded onto the film, between the perforations and the edge of the film, at the same time the image was taken to keep the sound and image in synchronization.

The intermediate film system, with its expensive film usage and relatively immobile cameras, did have the advantage that it left a filmed record of the programme which could be rerun at a different time, with a better image quality than the later kinescope films, which were shot from a video monitor.

Television tubes developed by EMI in England, based on Farnsworth's image dissector, had a much higher sensitivity to light. These made the intermediate film system obsolete for broadcast television by February 1937, though a disastrous fire in the Baird studios destroyed all the equipment and prematurely ended the trial broadcasts. However, according to an article by Ray Herbert of Baird Television in the February 1985 issue of Radio and Electronics World Baird was a member of team carrying out military evaluations of airborne television at Hendon Aerodrome from 1937 until 1940, having already worked on such a system for the French. The work in England was a comparison of the Marconi-EMI and Baird Intermediate film systems and although with 240 lines the latter was inferior in received definition, after landing the film from the Marcel Bloch plane was an advantage because there was still no method of recording the electronic system other than filming the material directly from a studio monitor (the telecine [UK] or kinescope [US] process).

Film continued to be used for time-shifting and as a long-term storage until electronic recording systems were invented.

== See also ==
- History of television

== Sources ==
- Raymond Fielding, A Technological History of Motion Pictures and Television, University of California Press, 1967, p. 251.
