= Fernsehturm =

Fernsehturm is the German word for television tower. A number of German cities have television towers and each will usually be referred to simply as "Fernsehturm" by the inhabitants of the city, although such towers broadcast many type of signals and not just television.

It may refer to any of the following structures:

- Fernsehturm Berlin
- Fernsehturm Schwerin-Zippendorf
- Fernsehturm Dresden-Wachwitz
- Fernsehturm Stuttgart
- Fernmeldeturm Mannheim
- Florianturm (Dortmund)
- Fernmeldeturm Münster
- Fernsehturm Heidelberg
- Heinrich Hertz Tower (Hamburg)
