= Dresden TV tower =

Coordinates: 51°02′24″N 13°50′20″E

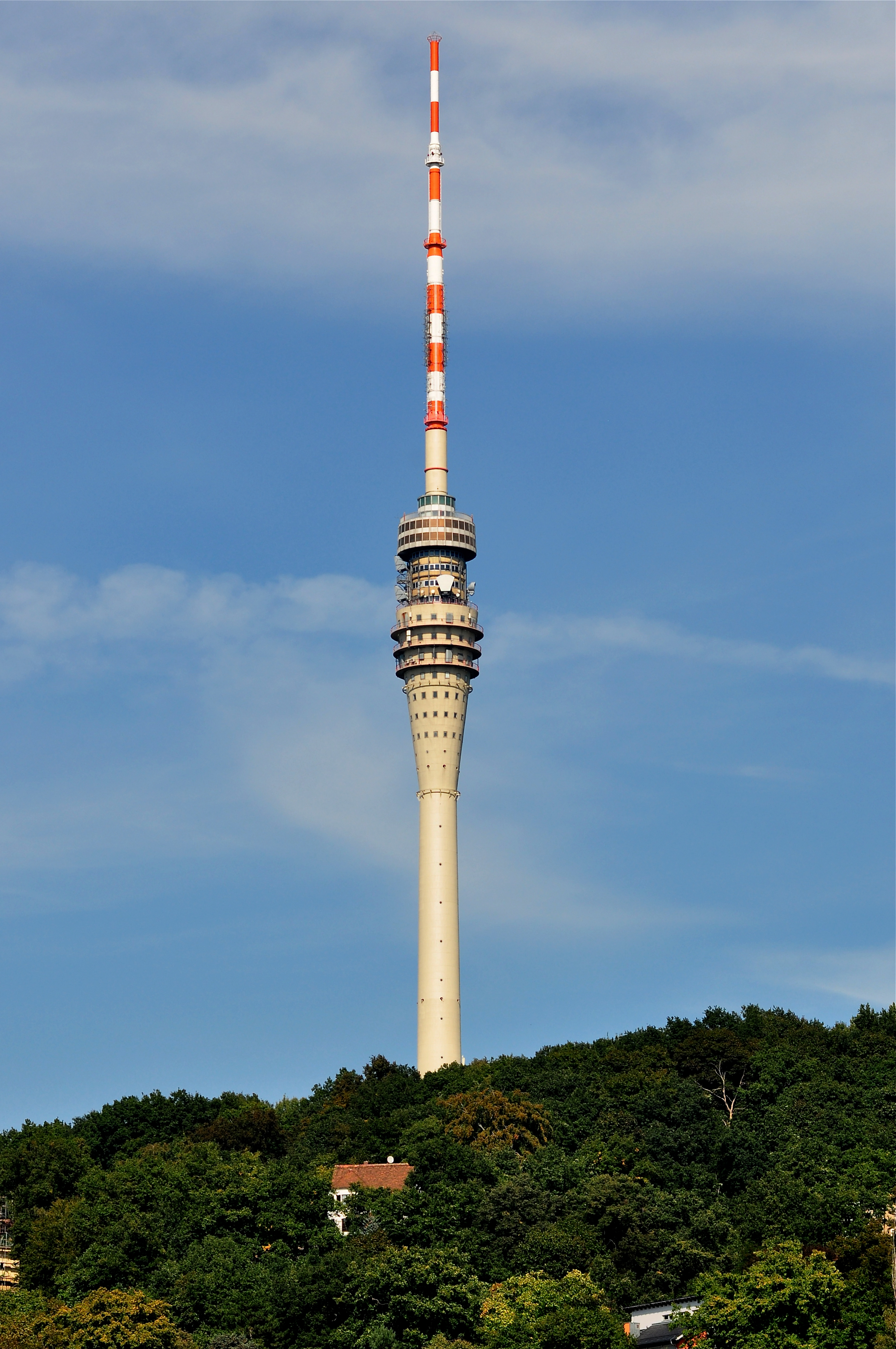
The Television tower and the village Wachwitz next to the Elbe

The Fernsehturm Dresden-Wachwitz is a TV tower in Dresden, Germany. It is situated on the Wachwitzer Elbhöhen and serves as a transmitting tower for television and radio broadcasts. Due to its visibility over large distances and its unusual form, it has become a landmark of Dresden and the Elbe Valley. Its address is 37 Oberwachwitzer Way, Dresden.

== Construction ==
The architects of the Dresdner TV tower were Kurt Nowotny, Hermann Rühle and Johannes Braune. Built between 1963 and 1969, its cup-like design was inspired by a sparkling wine glass. It is 252 metres high and is the second highest building in the former GDR after the Berlin TV tower, which is 368 metres high. The tip of the building towers approximately 373 metres above the Elbe river level and the foot is 230 metres above sea level. The shank of the building consists of reinforced concrete and has a diameter of 21 metres, which is buried underground to a depth of six metres in Lusatian granite. The total weight of the tower amounts to 7300 tonnes.

== Radio engineering ==
On September 18, 1969, radio transmissions were started from the tower. It possesses four transmission mechanisms for VHF broadcasts and three transmitters for television. In 2003, a small fire occurred in the transmitting rooms, which was quickly brought under control.

=== List of channels ===
==== Analogue radio (FM) ====
- 89.2 MHz: R.SA
- 90.1 MHz: MDR Jump
- 92.2 MHz: MDR Radio 1 Sachsen
- 93.2 MHz: Deutschlandradio Kultur
- 95.4 MHz: MDR Figaro
- 97.3 MHz: Deutschlandfunk
- 100.2 MHz: Energy Sachsen
- 102.4 MHz: Radio PSR
- 103.5 MHz: Radio Dresden
- 105.2 MHz: Hitradio RTL Sachsen
- 106.1 MHz: MDR info

==== Digital radio (DAB) ====
- Block 12A (223.936 MHz):
  - Deutschlandfunk
  - Deutschlandradio Kultur
  - MDR Klassik

==== Analog television (PAL) ====
- UHF 59 (visual 775.25 MHz, aural 781.25 MHz): Dresden Fernsehen

===== Historical broadcasts =====
Dresden, located in the bottom-right black area, could not receive television from West Germany due to its location in a valley. This valley earned the nickname "The Valley of The Clueless" ("Tal der Ahnungslosen").

East German television (DFF) was transmitted from the tower between 1969 and 1990. The first programme (DFF/DDR-FS/DDR1/DFF1) was on channel 10, with the second programme (DFF2/DDR2) broadcasting on channel 29 from 1972. DFF2/DDR2 broadcast in SECAM colour. This was deliberately different from the West German PAL standard, so East German residents could not watch West German broadcasts in colour. In practice, however, few East Germans owned colour sets, and reception of both standards was possible in black-and-white.

Dresden, because of its location in a valley, was one of the few areas of East Germany (and the only major city in the country) that could not receive the broadcast of West Germany's ARD (now known as Das Erste) from either Ochsenkopf or West Berlin, despite the best efforts of West German broadcasters to cover the whole of the East. This led to Dresden and the surrounding area being called "Tal der Ahnungslosen" ("The Valley of the Clueless"), because its citizens only had access to the propaganda of East Germany. ARD was said to stand for "Außer ("except") Rügen und Dresden" or rather "Außer Raum Dresden" ("except/outside of Dresden area").

The two East German programmes were replaced upon reunification by ARD and MDR Fernsehen, respectively, with ZDF broadcasts commencing on channel 46. All analogue transmissions of public stations from the tower ended on 22 July 2007. Analogue transmission of the commercial networks, which began with reunification, ended at different times. Broadcasts of RTL on channel 43 ended in 1995, when it was replaced by VOX. This was followed by the switchoff of Sat.1 on channel 48 in 2002, and finally VOX in 2004.

==== Digital television (DVB-T) ====
- UHF 29 (538 MHz): Regional third programmes
  - MDR
  - RBB
  - WDR
  - BR
- UHF 36 (594 MHz): ZDF programming
  - ZDF
  - 3sat
  - KI.KA/ZDFdokukanal
  - ZDFinfokanal
- UHF 39 (618 MHz): ARD programming
  - Das Erste
  - arte
  - Phoenix
  - EinsFestival

== Tourism ==
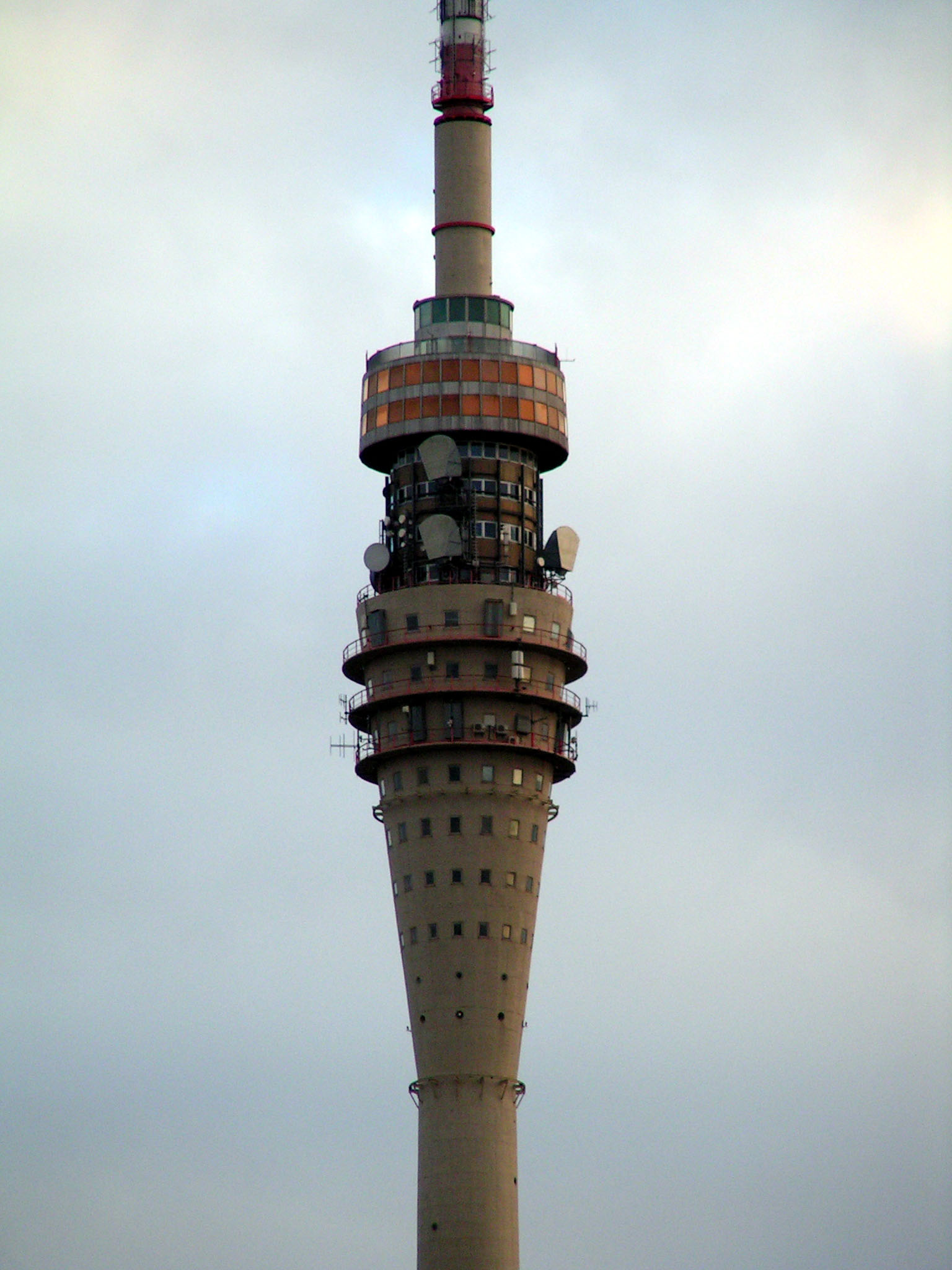
Details of the tower

Until its renovation in 1991 by Deutsche Telekom (German Telecom) and the closing-down of the GDR state-owned company which ran the HO Restaurant, the public could reach the tower by two elevators. Within the public area was a two-story restaurant with 132 seats at a height of 145 metres and above that was an observation platform. The renovations of the elevators, for a second escape route, for air conditioning and building services, catering and parking would cost 8 million euros. It is estimated that an economical enterprise would only be possible with 500,000 visitors per year.

== See also ==
- List of towers
