= Plaskett =

Plaskett may refer to:

== Places ==
- Plaskett, California
- Plaskett (crater), a lunar impact crater
- 2905 Plaskett, an asteroid

== People with the surname ==
- Elmo Plaskett (1938–1998), American baseball player
- Freddie Plaskett (1926–2018), British soldier and chief executive
- Harry Hemley Plaskett (1893–1980), Canadian astronomer
- James Plaskett (born 1960), British chess player
- Joel Plaskett (born 1974), Canadian rock musician
- John Stanley Plaskett (1865–1941), Canadian astronomer
- Joseph Plaskett (1918–2014), Canadian painter
- Stacey Plaskett (born 1966), American politician from the US Virgin Islands

== See also ==
- Plaskett's star
- Plaskitt, a surname
