= Sender Inselsberg =

Transmission facility in Germany

Coordinates: 50.85141°N 10.46537°E

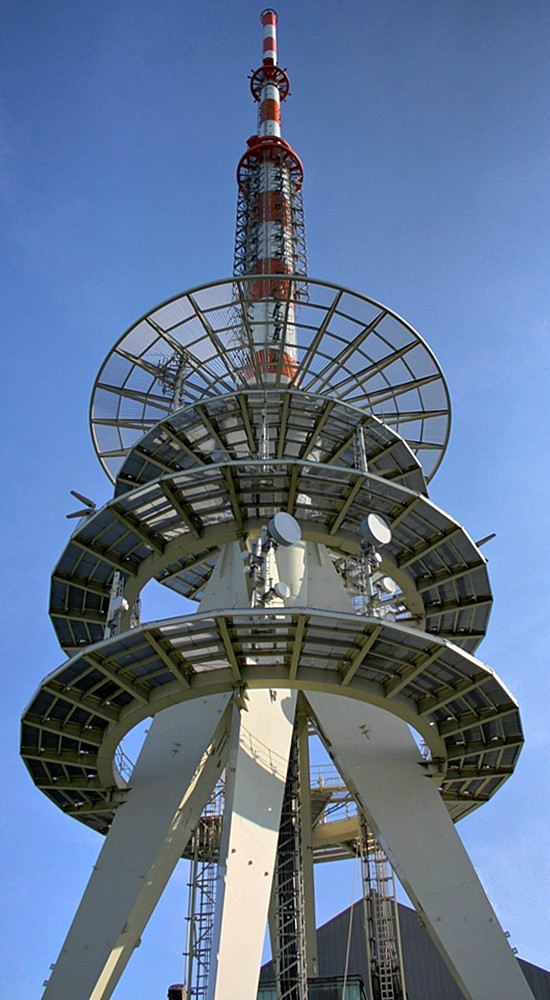
Sender Inselsberg.

The Sender Inselsberg (transmitter Inselsberg) is an FM, DAB+ and television-transmission facility on the Großer Inselsberg in Thuringia, Germany. It has two aerial towers, which were built in 1939 and 1974.

The transmission tower built in 1939 is a 43.31-metre-high (142.1 ft) freestanding cylindrical tower built of steel concrete, which carried until the beginning of the 1990s similar to Gerbrandy Tower a guyed steel tube mast on its top. This mast carried the FM- and TV-broadcasting aerials.

Nowadays this mast is demounted and there are only small aerials for mobile phone services on its top. The tower is nicknamed because of its cylindrical form "thermos flask".

The transmission tower built in 1974 is a 126-metre-tall (413 ft) freestanding steel tube tower on three feet. This tower which is similar to the tower of transmitter Brocken, which was built at the same time, carries above its legs three platforms for aerials for directional radio services and in its topmost section, protected by layers of glass-reinforced plastic, transmission aerials for FM broadcasting services and TV.

== Signals transmitted from Inselsberg ==
=== Analogue television (formerly) ===
- Das Erste (originally DFF1), VHF channel E5 (Horizontal) 100 kW
- MDR Fernsehen (originally DFF2), UHF channel 31 (Horizontal) 500 kW

=== FM radio ===
Frequency (MHz)	Programme	RDS PS	RDS PI	Regional programme	ERP (kW)
92.5	MDR Thüringen	MDR_THUE	D4F1	Erfurt	80
90.2	MDR Jump	MDR_JUMP	D3C2	–	80
87.9	MDR Kultur	__MDR___ / _KULTUR_	D3C3	–	49
97.2	Deutschlandfunk Kultur	Dlf_Kult	D220	–	100
102.2	Antenne Thüringen	ANT.THUE / AT-WEST_	D4F8 (regional), D3F8	West	100
104.2	Landeswelle Thüringen	LANDESW.	D4F9 (regional), D3F9	West	100

=== Digital Radio (DAB+) ===
Block	kW	Operator
5C	5	DR Deutschland
5D	5	Antenne Deutschland
8B	10	MDR Thüringen

=== Digital Television (DVB-T2) ===
Channel	Frequency (MHz)	Multiplex	Programmes	ERP (kW)	Bitrate (MBit/s)
27	522	MDR 1 (ARD)	Das Erste HD; tagesschau24 HD; MDR Sachsen HD; MDR S-Anhalt HD; MDR Thüringen HD; NDR FS NDS HD; rbb Brandenburg HD; SWR BW HD	50	23.6
39	618	MDR 2 (ARD)	arte HD; PHOENIX HD; ONE HD; BR Fernsehen HD; hr-fernsehen HD; WDR HD Köln; ARD-alpha HD (Internet); SWR BW HD (Internet)	50	23.6
41	634	Substream 0: ZDF (ZDFmobil) Substream 1: MEDIA BROADCAST	Substream 0: ZDF HD; ZDFinfo HD; zdf_neo HD; 3sat HD; KiKA HD; Substream 1: freenet.TV connect	50	22

In order to receive ARD-alpha HD (Internet) and SWR BW HD (Internet), a hbb-TV-compatible device is required.

== See also ==
- List of towers
- A Tower
