= Inselsberg =

Inselsberg can mean:

- Großer Inselsberg, a mountain in Thuringia, Germany
- Inselsberg transmitter, a former broadcast and TV transmitter on this mountain
- 10245 Inselsberg, an asteroid named after the mountain
