= Görlitz (electoral district) =

Federal electoral district of Germany

156 Görlitz
- Electoral district for the Bundestag
- Görlitz in 2025
- State: Saxony
- Population: 252,700 (2019)
- Electorate: 204,105 (2021)
- Major settlements: Görlitz; Zittau; Weißwasser
- Area: 2,111.4 km^{2}

Current electoral district
- Created: 1990
- Party: AfD
- Member: Tino Chrupalla
- Elected: 2017, 2021, 2025

Görlitz is an electoral constituency (German: Wahlkreis) represented in the Bundestag. It elects one member via first-past-the-post voting. Under the current constituency numbering system, it is designated as constituency 156. It is located in eastern Saxony, comprising the Görlitz district.

Görlitz was created for the inaugural 1990 federal election after German reunification. Since 2017, it has been represented by Tino Chrupalla of Alternative for Germany (AfD).

== Geography ==
Görlitz is located in eastern Saxony. As of the 2021 federal election, it is coterminous with the Görlitz district.

== History ==
Görlitz was created in 1990, then known as Görlitz – Zittau – Niesky. In the 2002 and 2005 elections, it was named Löbau-Zittau – Görlitz – Niesky. It acquired its current name in the 2009 election. In the 1990 through 1998 elections, it was constituency 315 in the numbering system. In the 2002 and 2005 elections, it was number 157. In the 2009 election, it was number 158. In the 2013 through 2021 elections, it was number 157. From the 2025 election, it has been number 156.

Originally, the constituency comprised the independent city of Görlitz and the districts of Landkreis Görlitz, Zittau, and Niesky. In the 2002 and 2005 elections, it comprised the independent city of Görlitz and the district of Löbau-Zittau, as well as the municipalities of Markersdorf, Niesky, Reichenbach, and Rothenburg, and the Verwaltungsverband of Weißer Schöps/Neiße from the district of Niederschlesischer Oberlausitzkreis. It acquired its current borders in the 2009 election.

== Members ==
The constituency was first represented by Georg Janovsky of the Christian Democratic Union (CDU) from 1990 to 2002. He was succeeded by fellow CDU member Michael Kretschmer from 2002 to 2017. Tino Chrupalla of the AfD was elected in 2017 and re-elected in 2021.

Election	Member	Party	%
1990	Georg Janovsky	CDU	53.5
1994	Georg Janovsky	CDU	56.9
1998	Georg Janovsky	CDU	41.8
2002	Michael Kretschmer	CDU	40.6
2005	Michael Kretschmer	CDU	38.5
2009	Michael Kretschmer	CDU	42.4
2013	Michael Kretschmer	CDU	49.6
2017	Tino Chrupalla	AfD	32.4
2021	Tino Chrupalla	AfD	35.8
2025	Tino Chrupalla	AfD	48.9

== Election results ==
=== 2025 election ===
Federal election (2025): Görlitz
Notes:	Blue background denotes the winner of the electorate vote. Pink background denotes a candidate elected from their party list. Yellow background denotes an electorate win by a list member, or other incumbent. A ✓ or ✗ denotes status of any incumbent, win or lose respectively.						
Party	Candidate	Votes	%	±%	Party votes	%	±%
AfD	✓ Tino Chrupalla	75,145	48.9	▲13.1	71,854	46.7	▲14.1
CDU	Florian Oest	37,197	24.2	▼1.9	30,406	19.8	▲1.5
BSW	Carsten Berg	9,832	6.4	New	13,822	9.0	New
Left	Gerhard Fuchs-Kittowski	9,795	6.4	▼1.6	11,900	7.7	▲0.2
SPD	Harald Prause-Kosubek	9,626	6.3	▼6.3	9,814	6.4	▼10.5
Greens	Monique Hänel	4,659	3.0	▼1.1	5,159	3.4	▼1.5
FW	Siegmund Hänchen	3,587	2.3	▼0.7	2,354	1.5	▼0.9
FDP	Toralf Einsle	2,951	1.9	▼5.5	4,484	2.9	▼7.0
Tierschutzpartei					1,960	1.3	▼0.9
PARTEI					678	0.4	▼0.5
BD	Klaus Reepen	980	0.6	New	613	0.4	New
Volt					440	0.3	▲0.1
Pirates					249	0.2	▼0.2
Humanists					139	0.1	0.0
MLPD					62	<0.1	0.0
Informal votes		1,280			1,118		
Total valid votes		153,772			153,934		
Turnout		155,052	79.0	▲4.0			
AfD hold	Majority	37,948	24.7	▲15.0			

=== 2021 election ===
Federal election (2021): Görlitz
Notes:	Blue background denotes the winner of the electorate vote. Pink background denotes a candidate elected from their party list. Yellow background denotes an electorate win by a list member, or other incumbent. A ✓ or ✗ denotes status of any incumbent, win or lose respectively.						
Party	Candidate	Votes	%	±%	Party votes	%	±%
AfD	✓ Tino Chrupalla	53,970	35.8	▲3.4	49,123	32.5	▼0.4
CDU	Florian Oest	39,299	26.1	▼5.3	27,630	18.3	▼8.4
SPD	Harald Prause‑Kosubek	18,928	12.5	▲1.6	25,441	16.8	▲7.6
Left	Marko Schmidt	11,835	7.8	▼5.7	11,327	7.5	▼6.5
FDP	Rudolf Grüner	11,222	7.4	▲2.5	15,039	10.0	▲2.9
Greens	Annett Jagiela	6,182	4.1	▲0.8	7,358	4.9	▲2.0
FW	Siegmund Hänchen	4,588	3.0	▲0.8	3,645	2.4	▲0.8
Tierschutzpartei					3,259	2.2	▲0.7
dieBasis	Stefan Heinke	4,115	2.7		2,583	1.7	
PARTEI					1,428	0.9	0.0
Gesundheitsforschung					1,045	0.7	
Pirates					540	0.4	0.0
NPD					488	0.3	▼1.2
Bündnis C					456	0.3	
LKR	Harald Twupack	417	0.3				
Volt					338	0.2	
Team Todenhöfer					331	0.2	
The III. Path					305	0.2	
Independent	Bernhard Blickle	267	0.2				
Humanists					185	0.1	
ÖDP					177	0.1	▼0.1
MLPD					106	0.1	0.0
V-Partei3					97	0.1	▼0.1
DKP					92	0.1	
Informal votes		2,234			2,064		
Total valid votes		150,823			150,993		
Turnout		153,057	75.0	▲1.7			
AfD hold	Majority	14,671	9.7	▲8.7			

=== 2017 election ===
Federal election (2017): Görlitz
Notes:	Blue background denotes the winner of the electorate vote. Pink background denotes a candidate elected from their party list. Yellow background denotes an electorate win by a list member, or other incumbent. A ✓ or ✗ denotes status of any incumbent, win or lose respectively.						
Party	Candidate	Votes	%	±%	Party votes	%	±%
AfD	Tino Chrupalla	49,834	32.4		50,551	32.9	▲24.7
CDU	✗ Michael Kretschmer	48,256	31.4	▼18.2	41,000	26.7	▼17.4
Left	Thorsten Ahrens	20,853	13.6	▼6.2	21,534	14.0	▼5.6
SPD	Thomas Jurk	16,801	10.9	▼4.3	14,249	9.3	▼3.3
FDP	Christine Schlagehan	7,661	5.0	▲3.4	10,810	7.0	▲4.2
Greens	Joachim Schulze	4,995	3.3	▼0.1	4,476	2.9	▼0.5
FW	Steffen Grosse	3,521	2.3		2,464	1.6	▼0.1
NPD					2,337	1.5	▼2.7
Tierschutzpartei					2,285	1.5	
PARTEI					1,444	0.9	
BGE					658	0.4	
Pirates					516	0.3	▼1.8
ÖDP					368	0.2	
BüSo	Ilias Papadopulos	1,722	1.1	▼0.3	362	0.2	▼0.2
DiB					290	0.2	
V-Partei³					248	0.2	
MLPD					128	0.1	0.0
Informal votes		2,446			2,369		
Total valid votes		153,643			153,720		
Turnout		156,089	73.3	▲4.9			
AfD gain from CDU	Majority	1,578	1.0				

=== 2013 election ===
Federal election (2013): Görlitz
Notes:	Blue background denotes the winner of the electorate vote. Pink background denotes a candidate elected from their party list. Yellow background denotes an electorate win by a list member, or other incumbent. A ✓ or ✗ denotes status of any incumbent, win or lose respectively.						
Party	Candidate	Votes	%	±%	Party votes	%	±%
CDU	✓ Michael Kretschmer	74,204	49.6	▲7.2	66,106	44.1	▲6.7
Left	Ilja Seifert	29,550	19.7	▼4.6	29,380	19.6	▼5.0
SPD	Thomas Jurk	22,741	15.2	▲3.6	18,839	12.6	▼0.1
AfD					12,331	8.2	
NPD	Per Lennart Aae	8,323	5.6	▲0.2	6,360	4.2	▼1.2
Greens	Joachim Schulze	5,045	3.4	▼1.7	5,044	3.4	▼1.4
Pirates	Manfred Stöckert	3,878	2.6		3,259	2.2	
FDP	Daniel Breutmann	2,442	1.6	▼7.8	4,185	2.8	▼10.3
FW					2,577	1.7	
BüSo	Siegmar John	2,069	1.4	▼0.5	685	0.5	▼1.0
BGD	Eleonore Rau	1,431	1.0				
PRO					1,023	0.7	
MLPD					172	0.1	▼0.2
Informal votes		3,261			2,983		
Total valid votes		149,683			149,961		
Turnout		152,944	68.4	▲5.7			
CDU hold	Majority	44,654	29.9	▲11.8			

=== 2009 election ===
Federal election (2009): Görlitz
Notes:	Blue background denotes the winner of the electorate vote. Pink background denotes a candidate elected from their party list. Yellow background denotes an electorate win by a list member, or other incumbent. A ✓ or ✗ denotes status of any incumbent, win or lose respectively.						
Party	Candidate	Votes	%	±%	Party votes	%	±%
CDU	✓ Michael Kretschmer	62,338	42.4	▲4.9	55,015	37.4	▲5.4
Left	Ilja Seifert	35,786	24.3	▼0.4	36,231	24.6	▲0.1
SPD	Wolfgang Gunkel	17,005	11.6	▼7.5	18,569	12.6	▼8.4
FDP	Toralf Einsle	13,935	9.5	▲2.8	19,223	13.1	▲3.9
NPD	Per Lennart Aae	7,842	5.3	▼1.4	8,035	5.5	▼0.6
Greens	Joachim Schulze	7,381	5.0	▲1.2	7,004	4.8	▲1.1
BüSo	Siegmar John	2,700	1.8	▲0.3	2,117	1.4	▲0.6
REP					540	0.4	0.0
MLPD					413	0.3	▲0.1
Informal votes		2,750			2,590		
Total valid votes		146,987			147,147		
Turnout		149,737	62.7	▼11.6			
CDU hold	Majority	26,552	18.1	▲5.3			

=== 2005 election ===
Federal election (2005):Görlitz
Notes:	Blue background denotes the winner of the electorate vote. Pink background denotes a candidate elected from their party list. Yellow background denotes an electorate win by a list member, or other incumbent. A ✓ or ✗ denotes status of any incumbent, win or lose respectively.						
Party	Candidate	Votes	%	±%	Party votes	%	±%
CDU	✓ Michael Kretschmer	56,744	38.5	▼2.2	48,436	32.8	▼5.1
Left	Ilja Seifert	34,704	23.5	▲5.2	35,392	24.0	▲7.7
SPD	Wolfgang Gunkel	27,343	18.5	▼8.5	30,105	20.4	▼8.0
FDP	Harald Twupack	9,905	6.7	▼2.8	13,784	9.3	▲1.8
NPD	Johannes Müller	9,834	6.7		8,801	6.0	▲4.0
Greens	Joachim Schulze	6,222	4.2	▲1.0	5,687	3.9	▲0.2
BüSo	Franz John	2,715	1.8	▲0.6	1,467	1.0	▲0.5
Alliance for Health, Peace and Social Justice					1,990	1.3	
PBC					835	0.6	0.0
REP					540	0.4	▼0.6
SGP					453	0.3	
MLPD					198	0.1	
Informal votes		3,483			3,262		
Total valid votes		147,467			147,688		
Turnout		150,950	74.3	▲2.1			
CDU hold	Majority	22,040	15				
