= Petersberg, Halle =

Petersberg
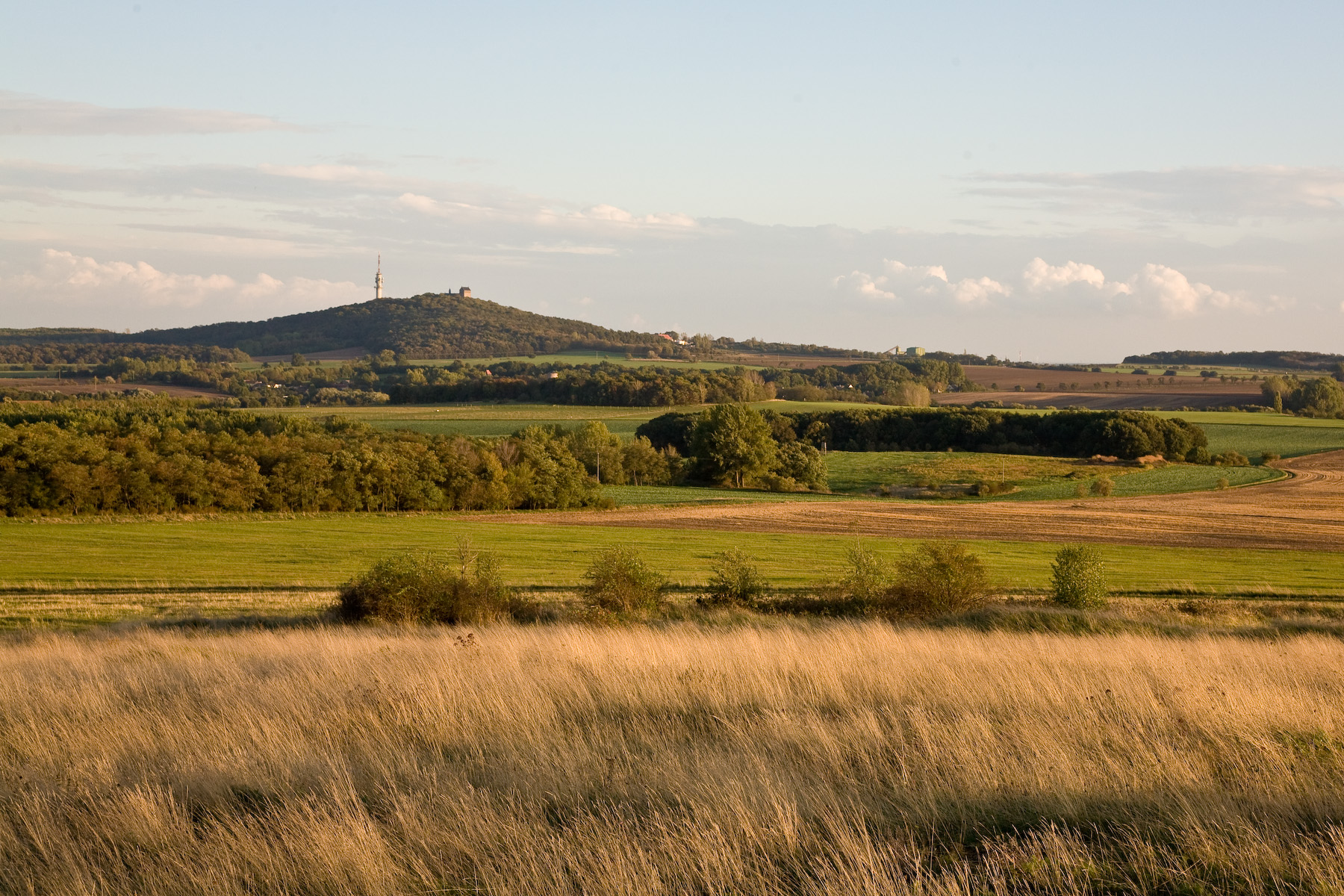
- The Petersberg seen from the direction of Löbejün

Highest point
- Elevation: 250.4 m above sea level (NN) (822 ft)
- Coordinates: 51°35′41″N 11°57′55″E

Geography
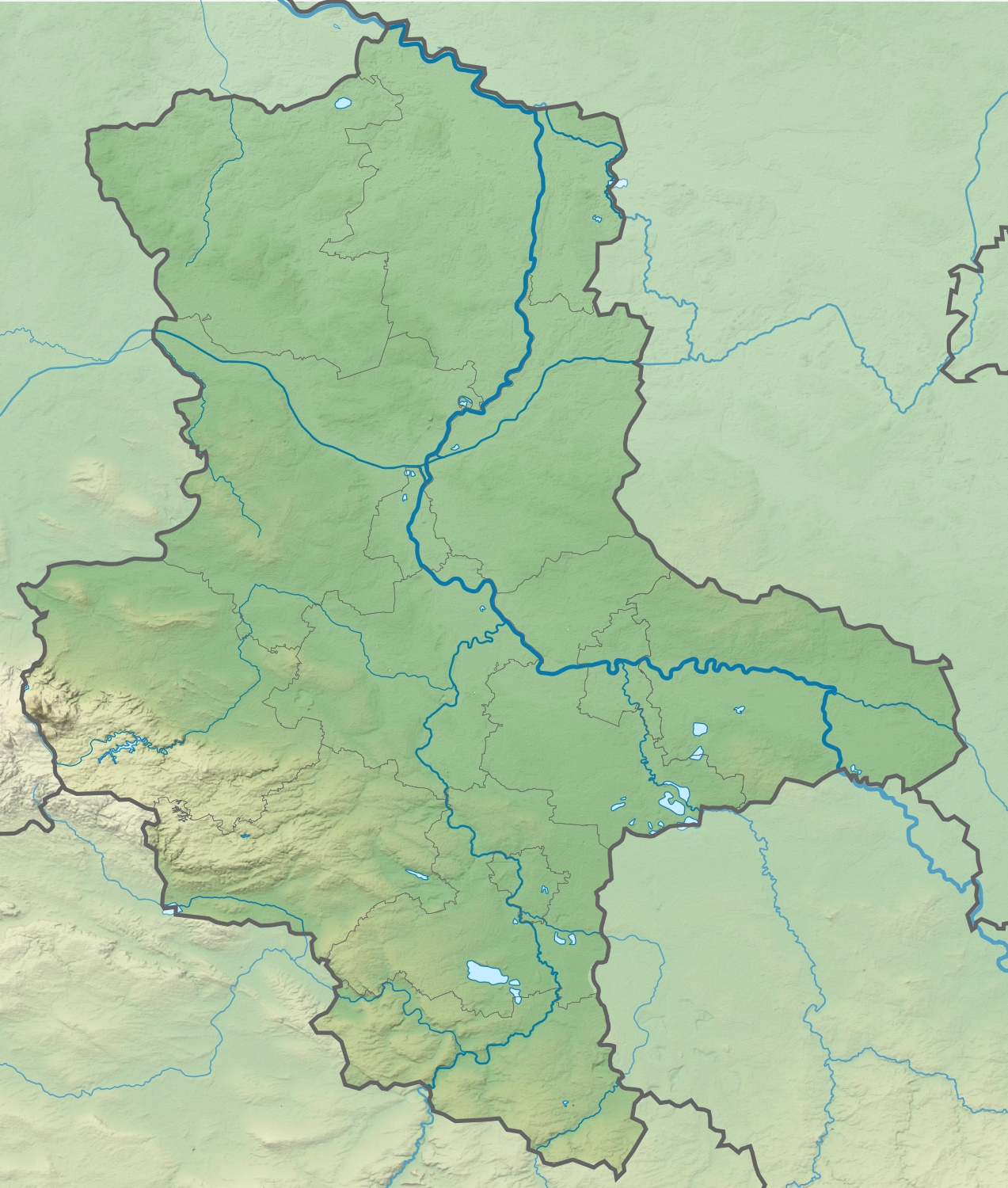
- Location within Saxony-Anhalt
- Location: Saalekreis, north of Halle, Germany

Geology
- Mountain type: Porphyry

The Petersberg (German pronunciation: [ˈpeːtɐsˌbɛʁk]), at 250.4 m above sea level (NN), is the highest point in the district of Saalekreis in the German state of Saxony-Anhalt.

Its name is derived from St. Peter's Church, which is on the hill. Until the 14th century the Petersberg was known as the Lauterberg.

== Geography ==
The Petersberg is located about 10 kilometres north of the German city of Halle on the River Saale not quite halfway between Halle and Köthen. The municipality of Petersberg with its hamlets of Drehlitz and Frößnitz lie on the hill. At the foot of the hill are the villages of Ostrau and Wallwitz as well as three small nature reserves. On the southern slopes of the hill is a small lake.

A stretch of the A 14 motorway runs past the Petersberg to the west and south, and the B 6 federal highway runs by to the southwest. They form a junction at Halle-Trotha, from where the Petersberg may easily be reached.

== Geology ==
The Petersberg is the highest point of the Halle Porphyry complex. It was formed, like the other porphyritic domes in the surrounding area, during the Upper Carboniferous and Lower Permian by the solidification of numerous molten lava flows under the earth. In the slowly cooling lava, easily visible feldspar and quartz crystals were formed. The Petersberg consists of small-grained Halle porphyry – this hard rock is used mainly as a raw material for the manufacture of ballast and gravel.

The present shape of the hill is a result of the last ice age. The surrounding loose rock was cleared away by the ice sheet leaving the hard porphyritic core behind. The top of the hill stood clear of the glacier as a nunatak.

== Petersberg Abbey ==
Petersberg Abbey with its collegiate church of St. Peter is a former Augustinian monastery. Since 1999 it has been used by an Evangelical monastic community of the Community of the Christ-Brotherhood Selbitz.

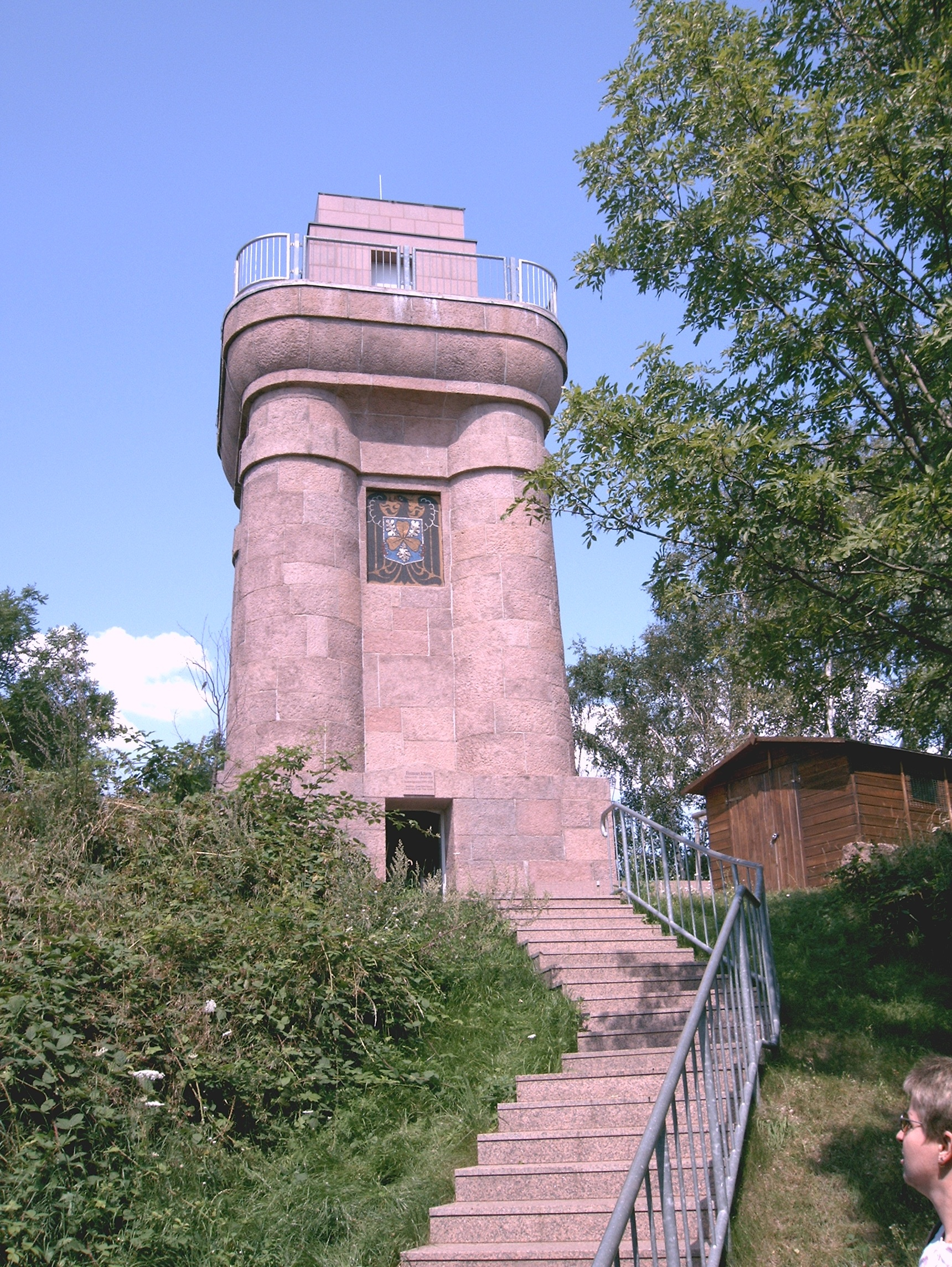
The Bismarck tower on the Petersberg

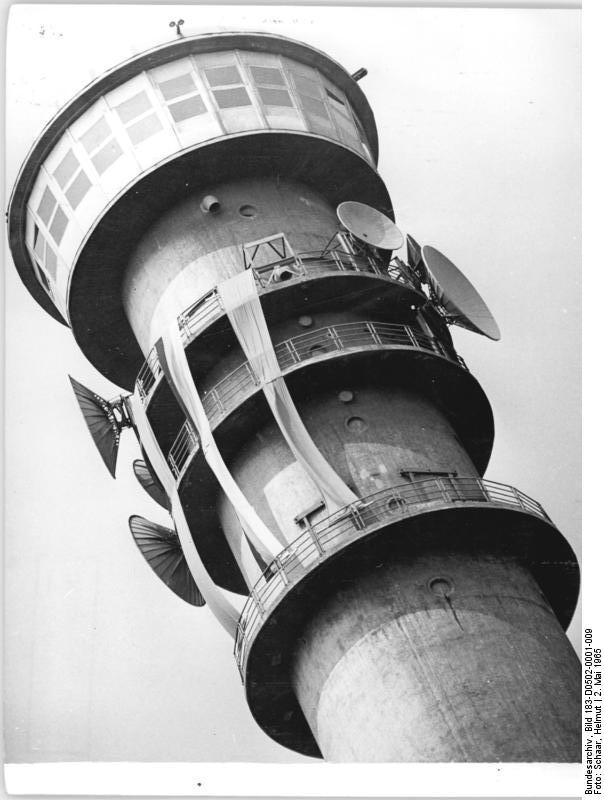
Communication tower on the Petersberg shortly after it was opened on 2 May 1965

== Bismarck tower ==
One of the 15 surviving Bismarck towers in Saxony-Anhalt stands on the Petersberg. Its 15-metre-high tower was built to a design by Wilhelm Kreis and inaugurated on 24 September 1902. The observation tower that was badly damaged in the Second World War was thoroughly renovated in 1999/2000, so that it is once again climbable for the first time since the war.

== Communication towers ==
There is a communication tower on the Petersberg at 51°35′43″N 11°57′26″E which was built in 1963 and became operational on 1 May 1965. Made of reinforced concrete, the Petersberg communication tower is 119 metres high and is now operated by Deutsche Telekom. It broadcasts several radio programmes for the Halle region, including MDR 1 Radio Sachsen-Anhalt, MDR Sputnik and Radio SAW.

There is also a seven-storey A Tower on the Petersberg which also belongs to Deutsche Telekom and has directional antennas on the roof.

== Tourism ==
The Petersberg is a popular tourist destination. On the hill is a wildlife park with Eurasian animals. There is also a sommerrodelbahn with toboggans and similar vehicles, that is open all year round. There are regular flea markets on a festival ground on the hill as well as other events.

The E11 European long distance path from the Netherlands to Masuria runs close by the Petersberg.

== Literature ==
- Otfried Wagenbreth und Walter Steiner: Geologische Streifzüge. Landschaft und Erdgeschichte zwischen Kap Arkona und Fichtelberg. Spektrum Akademischer Verlag, 4th edition, Leipzig, 1990, ISBN 9783342002277.
- Peter Rothe: Die Geologie Deutschlands. 48 Landschaften im Portrait. 2nd edition, Wissenschaftliche Buchgesellschaft, Darmstadt, 2006, ISBN 9783896785862.
