= A Tower =

Type of communication tower in East Germany

An A Tower (German: A-Turm) was a standard type of communication tower that was built in all provinces (Bezirke) of East Germany during the 1950s. These towers were 25 metres high, their roofs were equipped with a host of antennas and were painted green. Several had wooden cladding.

In the second half of the 1950s, the Central Committee (ZK) of the Socialist Unity Party of Germany (SED) began building its own communications system, the Richtfunknetz der Partei (RFN) which was totally independent of all other communication networks. There were two levels of network:

- Network Level 1: a network of microwave links from the ZK in Berlin to all SED provincial headquarters and
- Network Level 2: from the provincial HQs to all county HQs.

Their construction was prompted by the events of the popular uprising in East Germany on 17 June 1953. In all provinces of the GDR, apart from the urban conurbations, microwave communication centres (BzRFuZ) were established, initially in old barracks and, later, in the towers.

All BzRFuZ were given the designation "A1" prefixed by the respective provincial code number, for example, the Totenstein near Karl-Marx-Stadt was designated as 14A1. In the mid-1960s, the NVA joined the system with their own narrowband radio relay network. Both systems were only communication networks over which telephone and teleprinter circuits were operated. The towers in these networks were not used for surveillance.

Due to electronic eavesdropping of these networks by communications intelligence elements of the Bundeswehr and other NATO forces during the 1960s, the use of both networks was technically very restricted. The special radio service of the Stasi may have used the same towers for training purposes. The area around the A towers of the narrowband radio relay network was a military out-of-bounds area and was guarded against unauthorized access. Trespassing and the taking of photographs were punishable.

After the Wende the buildings were initially taken over by the Federal Ministry of Post and Telecommunications. Some of them were used by providers of mobile networks. Later they were developed or converted but continued to be used as telecommunications facilities.

== Locations ==
The following list shows a selection of the various locations of these towers.

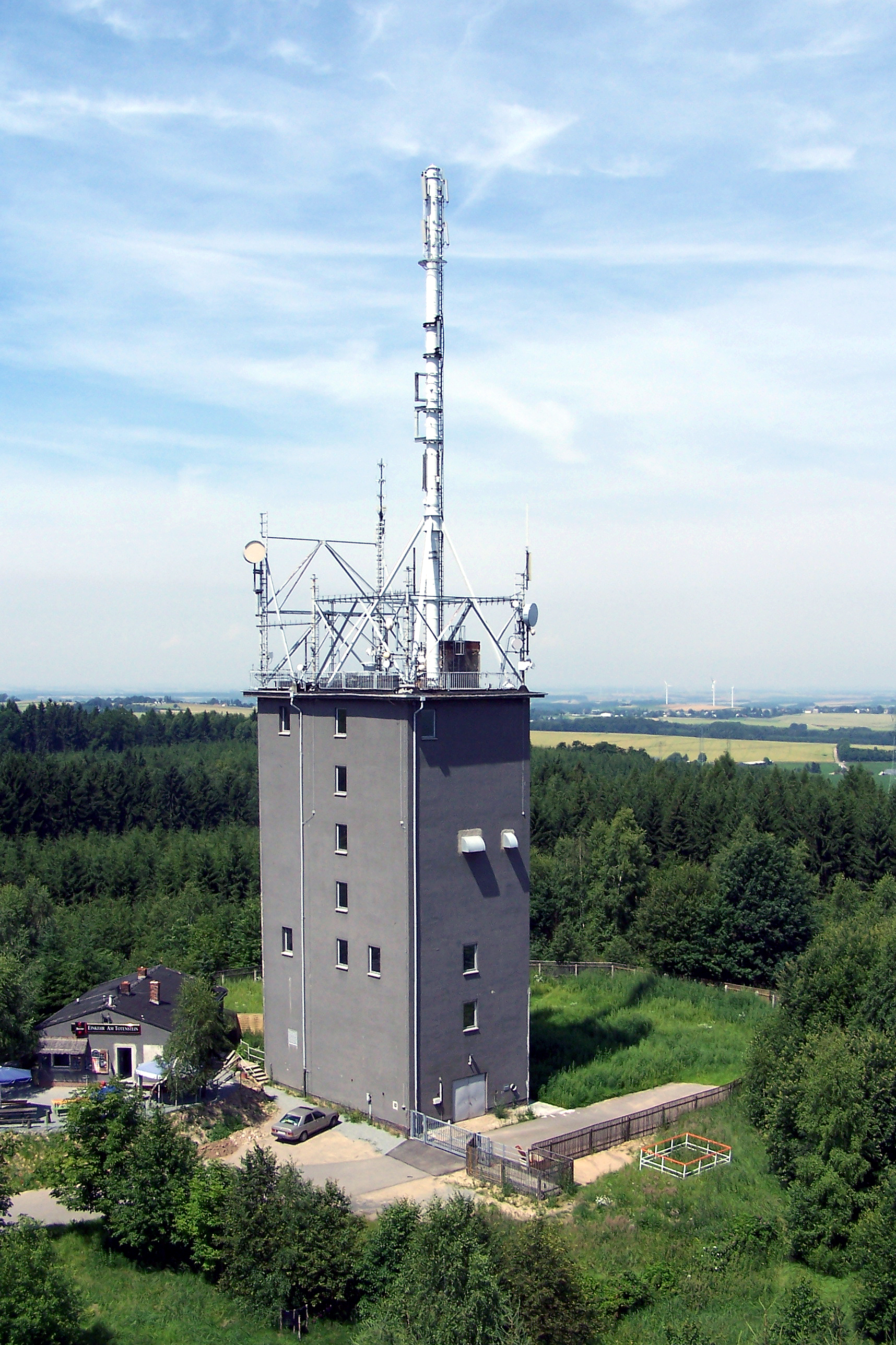
Upgraded A Tower on the Totenstein

- Stralsund
- Passee
- Klein Upahl
- Blumenholz
- Gühlen
- Oderberg-Hochsaalen
- Platzfelde
- Fleetmark
- Kammern
- Dolle
- Phöben near Werder (Havel)
- Trebbin
- Fürstenwalde
- Frohser Berg near Schönebeck
- Brocken
- Raben
- Ochsenkopf
- Petkus
- Petersberg bei Halle
- Crinitz
- Belgern
- Machern
- Nebra (Unstrut)
- Pettstädt
- Ettersberg
- Großer Inselsberg
- Schneekopf
- Eyba
- Altenburg
- Hohe Reuth (Bocka)
- Erlabrunn near Zwickau
- Netzschkau
- Auersberg
- Totenstein near Chemnitz
- Zschopau
- Dresden-Gompitz
- Frauenstein (Ore Mountains)
- Wilthen
- Ebersbach

== See also ==
- B Tower
