= 10245 Inselsberg =

Main-belt asteroid

Discovery
- Discovered by: C. J. van Houten; I. van Houten-G. T. Gehrels
- Discovery site: Palomar Obs.
- Discovery date: 24 September 1960

Designations
- Named after: Großer Inselsberg (German mountain)
- Alternative designations: 6071 P-L · 1995 DH_{2}
- Minor planet category: main-belt · (middle); Gefion

Orbital characteristics
- Epoch 23 March 2018 (JD 2458200.5)
- Uncertainty parameter 0
- Observation arc: 63.75 yr (23,284 d)
- Aphelion: 3.0301 AU
- Perihelion: 2.5332 AU
- Semi-major axis: 2.7816 AU
- Eccentricity: 0.0893
- Orbital period (sidereal): 4.64 yr (1,695 d)
- Mean anomaly: 325.09°
- Mean motion: 0° 12^{m} 45^{s} / day
- Inclination: 8.9010°
- Longitude of ascending node: 196.52°
- Argument of perihelion: 341.87°

Physical characteristics
- Mean diameter: 6.9 km (est. at 0.20)
- Geometric albedo: 0.20 (family estimate)
- Absolute magnitude (H): 13.2

10245 Inselsberg, provisional designation 6071 P-L, is a Gefion asteroid from the central regions of the asteroid belt, approximately 7 kilometers (4 miles) in diameter. It was discovered on 24 September 1960, by Ingrid and Cornelis van Houten at Leiden, and Tom Gehrels at Palomar Observatory in California, United States. The likely S-type asteroid was named for the German mountain Großer Inselsberg.

== Orbit and classification ==
Inselsberg is a member of the Gefion family (516), a large intermediate belt family, named after 1272 Gefion It orbits the Sun in the central asteroid belt at a distance of 2.5–3.0 AU once every 4 years and 8 months (1,695 days; semi-major axis of 2.78 AU). Its orbit has an eccentricity of 0.09 and an inclination of 9° with respect to the ecliptic. The body's observation arc begins with a precovery taken at Palomar Observatory in May 1954, or 6 years prior to its official discovery observation.

=== Palomar–Leiden survey ===
The survey designation "P-L" stands for Palomar–Leiden, named after Palomar Observatory and Leiden Observatory, which collaborated on the fruitful Palomar–Leiden survey in the 1960s. Gehrels used Palomar's Samuel Oschin telescope (also known as the 48-inch Schmidt Telescope), and shipped the photographic plates to Ingrid and Cornelis van Houten at Leiden Observatory where astrometry was carried out. The trio are credited with the discovery of several thousand asteroid discoveries.

== Physical characteristics ==
As a member of the Gefion family, Inselsberg is likely a stony S-type asteroid. It has an absolute magnitude of 13.2. As of 2018, no rotational lightcurve of Inselsberg has been obtained from photometric observations. The body's rotation period, pole and shape remain unknown.

=== Diameter and albedo ===
Based on a generic magnitude-to-diameter conversion, Inselsberg measures 6.9 kilometers in diameter for an assumed stony albedo of 0.20, derived from the Gefion family's standard albedo, and a measured absolute magnitude of 13.2. According to the survey carried out by the NEOWISE mission of NASA's Wide-field Infrared Survey Explorer, Inselsberg measures kilometers in diameter and its surface has an albedo.

== Naming ==
This minor planet was named after Großer Inselsberg, a mountain with an altitude of 916.5 m (3,007 ft) located in the Thuringian Forest in Thuringia, Germany. The official naming citation was published by the Minor Planet Center on 1 May 2003 (M.P.C. 48390).
