= Steffen Große =

German politician (born 1967)

Steffen Grosse
- Steffen Große

Leader of Bündnis Deutschland
- Incumbent
- Assumed office 20 November 2022

Personal details
- Born: 4 October 1967 (age 58) Stralsund, East Germany (current-day Germany)
- Party: Bündnis Deutschland (since 2022)
- Other political affiliations: Free Voters (2011–2020); CDU (1994–2006)

Steffen Grosse (born 4 October 1967 in Stralsund) is a German politician from the state of Saxony. Previously representing the Christian Democratic Union and Free Voters, he has been leader of Bündnis Deutschland since 2022.

== Origins and education ==
Grosse was born as the son of a chemical laboratory technician and a geologist in the city of Stralsund in Mecklenburg-Vorpommern (then East Germany) and grew up with an older brother in Stendal.

He graduated from the Winckelmann-Gymnasium in 1986 and studied journalism at the University of Leipzig from 1989 to 1994. From 1990 he worked as a freelance author for the Leipziger Volkszeitung newspaper and also as a freelance reporter and presenter for the Sachsen Radio.

In 1991 he moved to Leipzig to work as an editor for the news department of MDR Life for two years. He then worked as head of news and deputy editor-in-chief at Antenne Sachsen in Dresden.

=== Civil service ===
In 1994, Grosse became press spokesman for the Saxon Minister of Culture, Matthias Rößler. After he became Minister of State for Science and Art in 2002, Grosse took over the position of Head of Department for Press and Public Relations in the ministry.

He later became head of a project group and then head of department in the Saxon State Office for Political Education. In 2007, Grosse took over the position of press spokesman in the Saxon Ministry of the Interior under Albrecht Buttolo, before being called to the State Chancellery as head of the public relations department a year later, where he worked for the then Minister-President Stanislaw Tillich.

Grosse has been head of department in the Ministry of Culture since 2013. In 2019, he was also elected chairman of the administrative committee of the Central Office for Distance Learning for the state of Saxony.

=== Personal life ===
Grosse has been remarried since March 2023 and has two children from his first marriage. He has a stepson from his current wife's first marriage. The family lives in Dresden.

== Political career ==
=== CDU, Free Voters, Citizens' Alliance, BFA ===
In 1994, Grosse joined the Christian Democratic Union of Germany (CDU) and was particularly active in the Dresden district association. Disappointed by the policies of Chancellor Angela Merkel, he left the CDU in 2006.

In 2011, he joined the Free Voters and served as Secretary General and Federal Press Spokesman of the Federal Executive Board from June 2012. Grosse also became a member of the Saxony State Executive Board and was most recently as State Chairman.

He stood for the Free Voters in the 2013 German federal election in the Dresden II – Bautzen II constituency, in the 2014 Saxony state election in the Dresden 6 constituency and in the 2017 German federal election in the Görlitz constituency. In each case he failed to be elected.

In addition to his party affiliation, Grosse also led the citizens' movement Freie Wähler Dresden, a registered association that had existed in Saxony longer than the Free Voters party itself.

As a result of an internal debate about the COVID-19 pandemic in Germany, a falling out with the federal chairman of the Free Voters and Bavarian Minister of Economic Affairs Hubert Aiwanger arose in 2020 after Grosse had written a letter to Minister-President of Saxony Michael Kretschmer in April calling on him to lift the lockdown restrictions. Grosse's deputy Denise Wendt, who was also deputy federal chairwoman, intervened against the letter and publicly called for Grosse's resignation, which initially resulted in Wendt being suspended by the state executive committee for disloyalty. Aiwanger, in turn, called for the suspension to be lifted. The federal executive committee then removed Grosse as state chairman.

A short time later, Grosse and around 30 other members of the Free Voters Saxony announced their resignation from the party in protest, including the state chairwoman of the German Police Union, Cathleen Martin, who had been the top candidate in the 2019 Saxony state election.

In February 2021, Grosse founded the Citizens' Alliance Germany in Rodewisch, which set itself up as a federal party with a regional association in Saxony. Grosse took over the federal and regional chairmanship of the party. The co-founders also included Cathleen Martin and European swimming champion Jens Kruppa.

In March 2021, Grosse also joined the Bürgerlich-Freiheitlicher Aufbruch, which, as a registered association, formed a collective movement of liberal-conservative forces from various parties. There, he took over the management of the social media team from March 2022 and the management of the press and public relations department from June 2022 and thus the position of press spokesman. He gave up his positions at the Bürgerlich-Freiheitlicher Aufbruch at the end of 2022. In the Citizens' Alliance, he campaigned for the dissolution of the party in favour of Bündnis Deutschland, which ultimately happened at the end of 2022.

=== Bündnis Deutschland ===
From summer 2022, Grosse was involved in the preparation of the founding of Alliance Germany as a representative of the Citizens' Alliance and through his functions in the Civil-Liberal Awakening and is considered, alongside representatives of the Christian Democratic-Liberal Platform, the BFA and numerous individuals, to be one of the pioneers of Bündnis Deutschland.

On 20 November 2022, just a few days after ending his membership in the Citizens' Alliance, he was a founding member of Bündnis Deutschland in Fulda and was elected federal chairman of the new party.

Grosse was his party's top candidate for the 2024 Saxony state election.

=== Local politics ===
In the local elections on 9 June 2024 in Dresden, Grosse ran for the "Team Zastrow" of the former Saxon FDP state chairman Holger Zastrow in constituency XI "Cotta II/Dresden West" and won a seat in the city council.
