= MDR Klassik =

- Germany
- Broadcast area: Saxony; Saxony-Anhalt; Thuringia

Programming
- Language: German
- Format: Classical music

Ownership
- Operator: Mitteldeutscher Rundfunk (MDR)
- Sister stations: MDR Sachsen; MDR Sachsen-Anhalt; MDR Thüringen – Das Radio; MDR Kultur; MDR Aktuell; MDR Sputnik; MDR Jump; MDR Schlagerwelt; MDR Tweens

History
- First air date: 6 May 2002
- Last air date: 12 October 2026

Links
- Webcast: Listen Live
- Website: www.mdr.de/klassik

MDR Klassik is a German public radio station owned and operated by the Mitteldeutscher Rundfunk (MDR). The station broadcasts a classical music format, similar to BR-Klassik. It is a digital-only station and is not available via FM broadcasting.

On 12 October 2026, MDR shut down its classical music radio channel MDR Klassik and shift to digital distribution of classical content.
