= MDR Kultur =

Germany
- Broadcast area: Saxony; Saxony-Anhalt; Thuringia
- Frequency: see below

Programming
- Language: German
- Format: Culture (Brokered programming)

Ownership
- Operator: Mitteldeutscher Rundfunk (MDR)
- Sister stations: MDR Sachsen; MDR Sachsen-Anhalt; MDR Thüringen – Das Radio; MDR Jump; MDR Aktuell; MDR Sputnik; MDR Klassik; MDR Schlagerwelt; MDR Tweens

History
- First air date: 1 January 1992
- Former names: Mdr Figaro (2004–2016)

Links
- Webcast: Listen Live
- Website: mdrkultur.de

MDR Kultur is a German public radio station owned and operated by Mitteldeutscher Rundfunk (MDR). It broadcasts a culture format with current news and talk programs, along with classical, jazz and folk music. Between 1 January 2004 and 2 May 2016, the station was known as MDR Figaro.

== FM frequencies ==
- Leipzig (88.4 MHz)
- Oschatz (98.9 MHz)
- Dresden (95.4 MHz)
- Löbau (96.2 MHz)
- Geyer (87.7 MHz)
- Schöneck (98.7 MHz)
- Markneukirchen (106.4 MHz)
- Zittau (95.4 MHz)
- Saalfeld (100.7 MHz)
- Altmark (89.4 MHz)
- Brocken (107.8 MHz)
- Wittenberg (104.0 MHz)
- Magdeburg (107.4 MHz)
- Hoyerswerda (94.7 MHz)
- Seifhennersdorf (103.4 MHz)
- Jena (96.4 MHz)
- Inselsberg (87.9 MHz)
- Sonneberg (95.2 MHz)
- Suhl (89.8 MHz)
- Gera (103.9 MHz)
- Ronneburg (103.9 MHz)
- Klingenthal (98.4 MHz)

Former logo (2004–2016)

MDR Kultur is also available via DAB+, DVB-C, DVB-S and livestreaming
