= Fulvio Melia =

American physicist

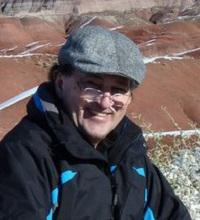
- Born: 2 August 1956 (age 70); Gorizia, Italy
- Education: Melbourne University; Massachusetts Institute of Technology
- Known for: High Energy Astronomy, supermassive black holes, cosmology
- Awards: Presidential Young Investigator Award (from President Ronald Reagan), Alfred P. Sloan Foundation Research Fellow, Sir Thomas Lyle Fellow, Miegunyah Fellow, Erskine Fellow, John Woodruff Simpson Chair
- Scientific career
- Fields: Astrophysics, Cosmology
- Workplaces: University of Arizona
- Doctoral advisor: Paul Joss and Saul Rappaport

Fulvio Melia (born 2 August 1956) is an Italian-American astrophysicist, cosmologist and author. He is a professor of physics, astronomy and the applied math program at the University of Arizona and was a scientific editor of The Astrophysical Journal and an associate editor of The Astrophysical Journal Letters. A former Presidential Young Investigator and Sloan Research Fellow, he is the author of six English books (and various foreign translations) and 230 refereed articles on theoretical astrophysics and cosmology.

== Career ==
Melia was born in Gorizia, Friuli-Venezia Giulia, Italy. He was educated at Melbourne University and Massachusetts Institute of Technology, and held a post-doctoral research position at the University of Chicago, before taking an assistant professorship at Northwestern University in 1987. Moving to the University of Arizona as an associate professor in 1991, he became a full professor in 1993. From 1988 to 1995, he was a Presidential Young Investigator (under President Ronald Reagan), and then an Alfred P. Sloan Research Fellow from 1989 to 1992. He became a fellow of the American Physical Society in 2002. He is also a professorial fellow in the School of Physics, Melbourne University, and a distinguished visiting professor at Purple Mountain Observatory in Nanjing, China.

From 1996 to 2002, he was a scientific editor with the Astrophysical Journal, and has later been an associate editor with The Astrophysical Journal Letters. He is also the chief editor of the Theoretical Astrophysics series of books at the University of Chicago Press.

Polarimetric image of the supermassive black hole Sgr A* at the Galactic Center (Bromley, Melia & Liu 2001)

In a career that has seen him publish 260 refereed research papers and seven books, Melia has made important contributions in High Energy Astronomy and the physics of supermassive black holes. He is especially known for his work on the Galactic Center, particularly developing a theoretical understanding of the central supermassive black hole, known as Sagittarius A*. With his students and collaborators, he was the first to propose that imaging this object with millimeter-interferometry would reveal the shape and size of the shadow predicted by general relativity, thereby providing empirical evidence for the validity of the Kerr metric. Fulvio Melia's foundational work on this concept, and associated outreach through several books he has written on this topic, have led to the development of the Event Horizon Telescope, which has made a mm-wavelength image of this object as predicted almost two decades ago.

Alongside his students Melia has also developed the so-called R_{h}=ct universe or Melia cosmology, a cosmological theory that, they argue, has accounted for the observational data better than all other models proposed thus far. In this cosmology, the Universe has no horizon problem, and might therefore evolved without inflation.

Melia's cosmology is notable for its simplicity and its adherence to the symmetries implied by the Friedmann-Robertson-Walker metric, which require the comoving frame to be inertial. The R_{h}=ct universe however cannot account for observed primordial nucleosynthesis abundances as it predicts helium abundances several orders of magnitude lower than observed and virtually no primordial deuterium. In addition the expansion of the universe measured by the Supernova Cosmology Project strongly disfavors a non-accelerating expansion history which is a central aspect of the Melia cosmology, and the theory's predictions of the scale of baryon acoustic oscillations are not consistent with observations of the cosmic microwave background.

Melia is a publicist of astronomy and science in general, delivering lectures at public venues, including museums and planetariums. His books have won several awards of distinction, including the designation of Outstanding Academic Books by the American Library Association, and selection as worldwide astronomy books of the year by Astronomy magazine.

In 2014, he presented the Walter Stibbs Lecture at the University of Sydney, the title being "Cracking the Einstein Code".

== Books ==
- Electrodynamics (2001), University of Chicago Press, ISBN 978-0-226-51957-9 (Cloth), ISBN 978-0-226-51958-6 (Paper)
- The Black Hole at the Center of Our Galaxy (2003), Princeton University Press, ISBN 978-0-691-09505-9 (Cloth)
- Il Buco Nero al Centro della Nostra Galassia (2005), Bollati Boringhieri, ISBN 978-88-339-1608-8
- The Edge of Infinity. Supermassive Black Holes in the Universe (2003), Cambridge University Press, ISBN 978-0-521-81405-8 (Cloth)
- Na Skraju Nieskonczonosci (2005), Wydawnictwo Amber, ISBN 83-241-2296-6 (Cloth)
- The Galactic Supermassive Black Hole (2007), Princeton University Press, ISBN 978-0-691-13129-0
- High-Energy Astrophysics (2009), Princeton University Press, ISBN 0-691-14029-4 (Paper), ISBN 978-0-691-14029-2 (Cloth)
- Cracking the Einstein Code (2009), University of Chicago Press, ISBN 0-226-51951-1, ISBN 978-0-226-51951-7
- The Cosmic Spacetime (2020), Taylor & Francis, ISBN 0367532190, ISBN 978-0367532192
