= MDR Aktuell =

- Das Nachrichtenradio (The news radio)
- Germany
- Broadcast area: Saxony; Saxony-Anhalt; Thuringia

Programming
- Language: German
- Format: News/Talk

Ownership
- Operator: Mitteldeutscher Rundfunk (MDR)
- Sister stations: MDR Sachsen; MDR Sachsen-Anhalt; MDR Thüringen – Das Radio; MDR Kultur; MDR Jump; MDR Sputnik; MDR Klassik; MDR Schlagerwelt; MDR Tweens

History
- First air date: 1 January 1992; 34 years ago
- Former names: MDR Info (1992–2016)

Links
- Webcast: Listen Live
- Website: mdraktuell.de

MDR Aktuell is a German public radio station owned and operated by Mitteldeutscher Rundfunk (MDR). The station broadcasts news and current affairs 24 hours a day. At night, it produces ARD Infonacht which is rebroadcast by several other regional all-news stations. The station was originally called MDR Info. The name was changed in 2016 to bring it in line with MDR's television news branding.
