= Gefion family =

Asteroid family

The Gefion family (FIN: 516; adj. Gefionian; also known as the Ceres family or the Minerva family) is an asteroid family located in the intermediate asteroid belt between 2.74 and 2.82 AU at inclinations of 7.4° to 10.5°. The family of S-type asteroids is named after 1272 Gefion and consists of more than 2,500 known members. It had previously been known as the Ceres family. It is still known as Minerva family, named after then thought parent body 93 Minerva, until it was identified to be an interloper into its own family.

== Properties ==
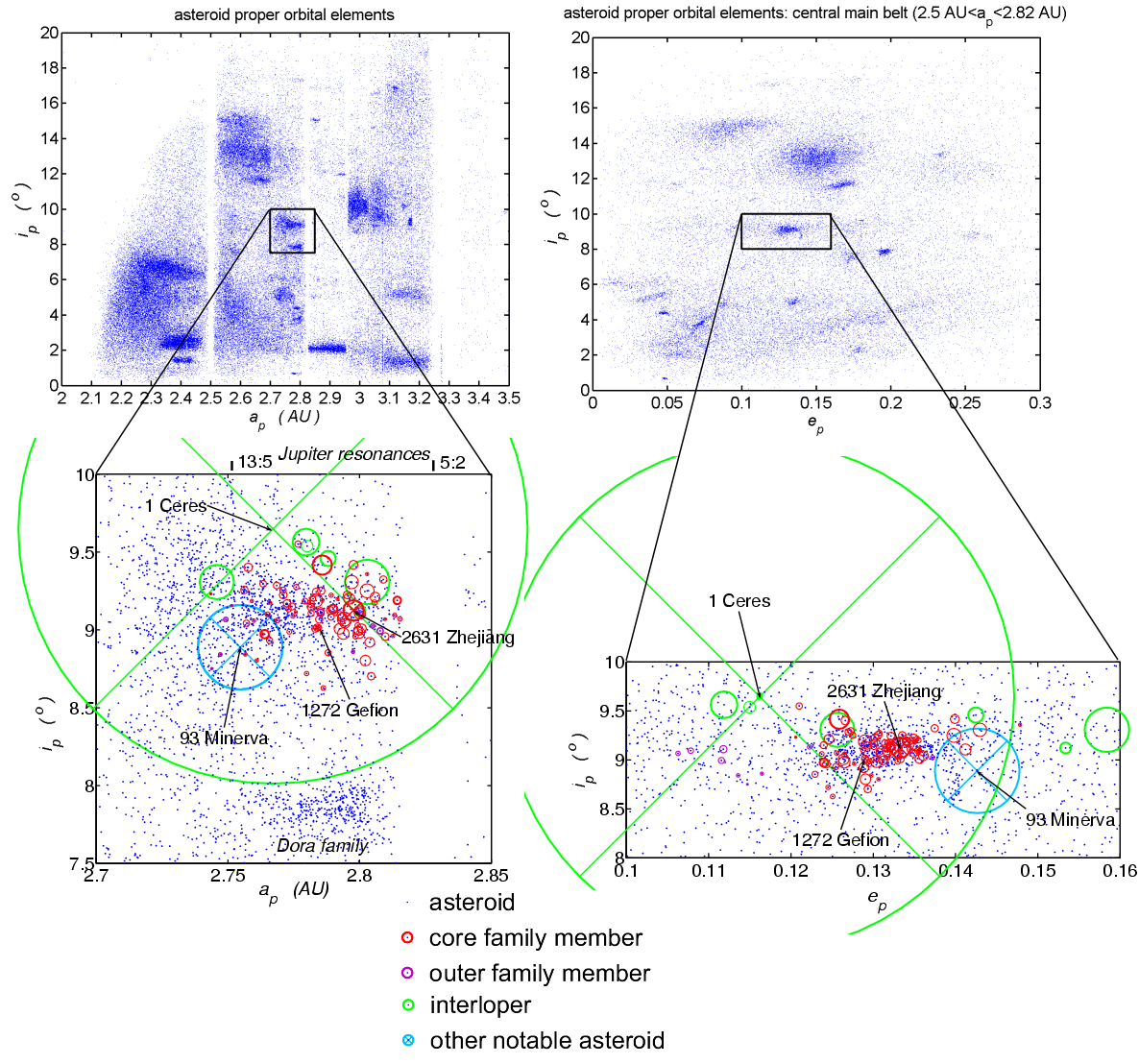
Location and structure of the Gefion family.

The members have proper orbital elements in the approximate ranges

	a_{p}	e_{p}	i_{p}
min	2.74 AU	0.120	8.6°
max	2.82 AU	0.148	9.6°

At the present epoch, the range of osculating orbital elements of these core members is

	a	e	i
min	2.74 AU	0.081	7.4°
max	2.82 AU	0.18	10.5°

The namesake is 1272 Gefion. The family is fairly large, e.g. the Zappala 1995 analysis found about a hundred core members. A search of a recent proper element database found 766 objects (about 0.8% of the total) lying within the region defined by the first table above.

2631 Zhejiang has a diameter of 34 km, and is the largest core member whose diameter has been reliably estimated, although 2911 Miahelena is brighter, and would have a rough diameter of about 47 km, given the same (very low) albedo of 0.025.

== Alternative name and interlopers ==
Until recently, this family was known as the Ceres family (adj. Cererean) or the Minerva family (adj. Minervian) after 1 Ceres (the largest asteroid) or 93 Minerva. However, spectroscopic analyses showed that these largest members were in fact interlopers in their own family, having a different spectral class from the bulk of the members. Other known interlopers are 255 Oppavia, 374 Burgundia, 2507 Bobone, and 2559 Svoboda. This left the fairly minor asteroid 1272 Gefion as the lowest-numbered member.

== List of members ==
This is a list of the known family members, without the above-mentioned interlopers.

Name	a (AU)	e
1272 Gefion	2.78385	0.15170
1433 Geramtina	2.79948	0.16918
1751 Herget	2.79319	0.17242
1839 Ragazza	2.79898	0.16824
2053 Nuki	2.80260	0.14050
2157 Ashbrook	2.78440	0.11071
2373 Immo	2.79433	0.17339
2386 Nikonov	2.81456	0.15728
2493 Elmer	2.78777	0.17198
2521 Heidi	2.79475	0.08893
2595 Gudiachvili	2.78595	0.14340
2631 Zhejiang	2.79730	0.16070
2801 Huygens	2.79969	0.17422
2875 Lagerkvist	2.79792	0.09969
2905 Plaskett	2.80233	0.09847
2911 Miahelena	2.79520	0.09303
2977 Chivilikhin	2.78884	0.16849
3724 Annenskij	2.76293	0.16535
3788 Steyaert	2.79307	0.10127
3860 Plovdiv	2.80586	0.15548
3910 Liszt	2.79442	0.13349
3964 Danilevskij	2.75822	0.16608
4020 Dominique	2.77626	0.15885
4096 Kushiro	2.80989	0.15066
4182 Mount Locke	2.79806	0.13498
4702 Berounka	2.79387	0.09181
5159 Burbine	2.78979	0.10861
5401 Minamioda	2.79463	0.15238

Name	a (AU)	e
(5622) 1990 TL4	2.80083	0.17319
5685 Sanenobufukui	2.79967	0.09267
5712 Funke	2.77496	0.16644
5823 Oryo	2.77638	0.16166
5955 Khromchenko	2.80234	0.09628
6044 Hammer-Purgstall	2.77489	0.15517
6078 Burt	2.80392	0.17351
6211 Tsubame	2.75642	0.09601
6594 Tasman	2.78152	0.15916
7094 Godaisan	2.78088	0.16534
7211 Xerxes	2.79870	0.16302
7272 Darbydyar	2.78220	0.09822
(7397) 1986 QS	2.78255	0.16568
7451 Verbitskaya	2.81240	0.16818
(7576) 1990 BN	2.78349	0.10158
7651 Villeneuve	2.78245	0.14156
7735 Scorzelli	2.75694	0.16628
(8334) 1984 CF	2.78591	0.09965
8440 Wigeon	2.78016	0.14078
8451 Gaidai	2.77253	0.16753
(8511) 1991 PY10	2.76992	0.15337
(8659) 1990 SE11	2.78176	0.15170
8819 Chrisbondi	2.78098	0.17028
(9173) 1989 TZ15	2.79053	0.11959
9511 Klingsor	2.76784	0.14054
10245 Inselsberg	2.78004	0.09434
(10335) 1991 PG9	2.79360	0.15011
10649 VOC	2.81578	0.12154

Name	a (AU)	e
10665 Ortigão	2.79851	0.15765
12275 Marcelgoffin	2.76315	0.15291
12279 Laon	2.76990	0.09282
(15216) 1981 EX_{14}	2.81210	0.10526
(16188) 2000 AH_{175}	2.76810	0.16222
(16283) 2545 P-L	2.76575	0.17269
(16344) 2370 T-3	2.81525	0.15026
(17344) 1120 T-3	2.78514	0.15738
(17480) 1991 PE10	2.78785	0.17691
(18351) 1990 QN5	2.78987	0.17546
19994 Tresini	2.77468	0.17725
(22259) 1979 MD_{5}	2.75828	0.11401
(24623) 1979 MD_{8}	2.76196	0.10315
(26026) 4664 P-L	2.81391	0.17207
(26032) 6556 P-L	2.80445	0.18117
(26099) 1989 WH	2.76196	0.14457
(26799) 1979 XL	2.78649	0.11048
(29038) 4030 T-1	2.79852	0.15112
(29043) 2024 T-2	2.76377	0.14769
(30655) 2289 T-1	2.77225	0.10578
(30731) 1981 EK_{2}	2.75702	0.12711
(34961) 2252 T-2	2.76469	0.16515
(35013) 1981 EL_{3}	2.74368	0.08177
(37508) 3190 T-2	2.77635	0.10965
(43734) 1979 MY_{7}	2.76154	0.11756
(48348) 4124 P-L	2.79337	0.16135
(85188) 1991 PK12	2.78491	0.17877
(117991) 1033 T-2	2.8035	0.1627
