= Ilja Seifert =

German politician (1951–2022)

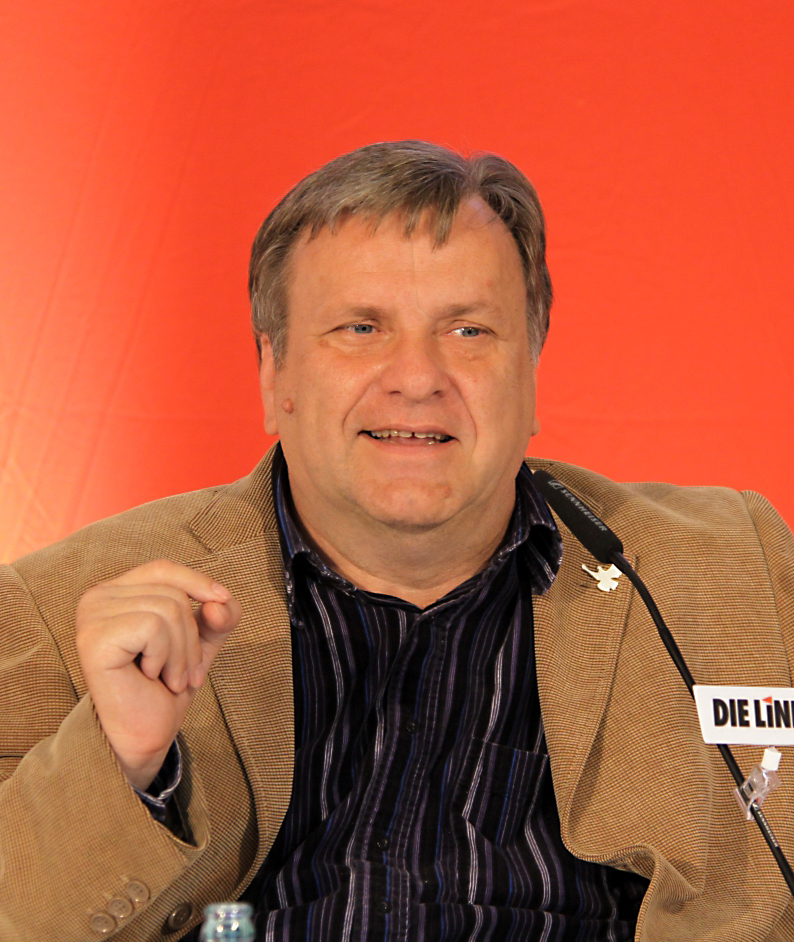
- Seifert in 2009

Member of the Bundestag
- In office 18 October 2005 – 22 October 2013
- In office 26 October 1998 – 17 October 2002
- In office 3 October 1990 – 10 November 1994
- Constituency: Görlitz

Member of the Volkskammer
- In office 18 March 1990 – 2 October 1990

Personal details
- Born: 6 May 1951 Berlin
- Died: 10 September 2022 (aged 71)
- Party: PDS; The Left
- Education: Humboldt University of Berlin
- Occupation: Researcher

Ilja Seifert (6 May 1951 – 10 September 2022) was a German politician. A member of the Party of Democratic Socialism and later The Left, he served in the Volkskammer from March to October 1990 and in the Bundestag from 1990 to 1994, 1998 to 2002, and again from 2005 to 2013.

Seifert died on 10 September 2022, at the age of 71.
