= Plaskitt =

Plaskitt is an English surname. Notable people with the surname include:

- Frederick Plaskitt (1867–1926), English tennis player
- Geoffrey Plaskitt (born 1940), English cricketer
- James Plaskitt (born 1954), British politician
- Nigel Plaskitt (born 1950), English actor, puppeteer, television producer and director

== See also ==
- Plaskett (disambiguation)
