= Walter Stibbs =

Douglas Walter Noble Stibbs FRSE FRAS (1919–2010) was a 20th century Australian astronomer and astrophysicist, remembered for his work at St Andrews University where he held the Napier Chair in Astronomy for 30 years. The Prof Walter Stibbs Lectures at Sydney University are named in his honour.

== Life ==
He was born on 17 February 1919 in Sydney in Australia, but of Scots descent. His father died when he was three. From 1937 he studied Physics at the University of Sydney, winning the Deas-Thomson Scholarship in 1940 and graduating BSc in 1942 and MSc in 1943. In the Second World War he was based at Mount Stromlo Observatory researching gunsights. In the latter years of the war he lectured in Maths and Physics at the University of New South Wales, before returning to Mount Stromlo in 1945.

In 1951 he moved to the Oxford University Observatory as a Radcliffe Fellow, working alongside Professor Harry Plaskett. During his time in Oxford he played cricket with the Berkshire Gentleman. From 1955 to 1959 he did research at the Atomic Weapons Research Establishment at Aldermaston. In 1959 he was given the Napier Chair as Professor of Astronomy at St Andrews University. There he organised the building of the 38-inch Cassegrain-Schmidt telescope. He also organised for the construction of the university's very first computer in 1964. In 1968 he worked on the first studies of stellar radiative opacity with T. R. Carson and D. F. Mayers.

In 1961 he was elected a Fellow of the Royal Society of Edinburgh.

He was a Fellow of the Royal Astronomical Society and served as its Vice President 1972/3.

A keen runner, in 1991 he won the gold medal for the marathon in the Australian Veteran Games in Canberra.

He died in Canberra, Australia on 12 April 2010.

== Family ==
In 1949 he was married to fellow-scientist Margaret Calvert.

== Publications ==
- The Outer Layers of a Star (1953) co-written with Sir Richard Woolley.

== Walter Stibbs Lectures ==
There is a prestigious annual lecture series sponsored by the Stibbs family in memory of Walter Stibbs, together with the Sydney Institute for Astronomy, University of Sydney. Some of the past Stibbs Lecturers have been:

- 2014 - Prof Fulvio Melia - "Cracking the Einstein Code"
- 2015 - Prof Andrea Ghez - "The Monster at the Heart of our Universe"
- 2016 - Prof Natalie Batalha
- 2017 - Prof David Reitze - "LIGO Gravitational Waves"
- 2018 - Prof Brian Schmidt - "The State of the Universe"
- 2019 - Prof Jocelyn Bell Burnell - "Pulsars and the universe"
- 2020 - postponed due to the COVID-19 crisis
- 2021 - Dr Jill Tarter - "A Cosmic Perspective"
- 2023 - Dr Emily Levesque - "The Last Stargazers: True Stories and Adventures of Astronomy"
- 2024 - Prof Richard Ellis - "The Quest For Cosmic Dawn: Results from the James Webb Space Telescope"
