= MDR Schlagerwelt =

- Germany
- Broadcast area: Saxony; Saxony-Anhalt; Thuringia

Programming
- Language: German

Ownership
- Operator: Mitteldeutscher Rundfunk (MDR)
- Sister stations: MDR Sachsen; MDR Sachsen-Anhalt; MDR Thüringen – Das Radio; MDR Kultur; MDR Aktuell; MDR Sputnik; MDR Klassik; MDR Jump; MDR Tweens

History
- First air date: 2 September 2016; 9 years ago

Links
- Website: mdrschlagerwelt.de

MDR Schlagerwelt is a German, public radio station owned and operated by the Mitteldeutscher Rundfunk (MDR). It mostly broadcasts schlager music, which formerly aired on the three regional MDR stations (MDR Sachsen, MDR Sachsen-Anhalt, and MDR Thüringen – Das Radio) until they changed to an international oldie-based format.

MDR Schlagerwelt is a digital-only station and is not available on FM.

The channel is scheduled to close by December 31, 2026.
