= MDR Life =

- Alles wissen, alles hören, alles MDR Life (Know everything, hear everything, everything MDR Life)

Germany
- Broadcast area: Saxony; Saxony-Anhalt; Thuringia

Programming
- Language: German
- Format: Adult contemporary

Ownership
- Operator: Mitteldeutscher Rundfunk (MDR)

History
- First air date: 1 January 1992
- Last air date: 31 December 1999

MDR Life was a German, public radio station owned and operated by the Mitteldeutscher Rundfunk (MDR). It broadcast a pop-based AC format.

With the turn of the millennium, MDR Life was replaced by Jump FM (now known as MDR Jump), which targets a younger audience than its predecessor.
