= Plaskett's Star =

Spectroscopic binary star in the constellation Monoceros

- Location of Plaskett's Star (circled in red)

Observation data Epoch J2000.0 Equinox J2000.0
- Constellation: Monoceros
- Right ascension: 06^{h} 37^{m} 24.04209^{s}
- Declination: +06° 08′ 07.3691″
- Apparent magnitude (V): 6.04 - 6.08

Characteristics
- Spectral type: O8I + O7.5III
- U−B color index: –0.88
- B−V color index: +0.05

Astrometry
Radial velocity (R_{v})	+24.5 km/s
Proper motion (μ)	RA: –2.070 mas/yr Dec.: +1.226 mas/yr
Parallax (π)	0.7615±0.0701 mas
Distance	4,300 ± 400 ly (1,300 ± 100 pc)

Details

A
Mass	54 M_{☉}
Radius	14.2 R_{☉}
Luminosity	224,000 L_{☉}
Surface gravity (log g)	3.5±0.1 cgs
Temperature	33,500±2,000 K
Rotational velocity (v sin i)	75 km/s

B
Mass	56 M_{☉}
Radius	10.8 R_{☉}
Luminosity	123,000 L_{☉}
Surface gravity (log g)	3.5±0.1 cgs
Temperature	33,000±2,000 K
Rotational velocity (v sin i)	300 km/s

Other designations
- Plaskett's Star, V640 Mon, BD+06°1309, GC 8631, HD 47129, HIP 31646, HR 2422, SAO 114146

Database references
SIMBAD	data

Plaskett's Star /ˈplæskɪts/, also known as HR 2422 and V640 Monocerotis, is a spectroscopic binary at a distance of around 4,300 light-years. It is one of the most massive binary stars known, with a total mass of around one hundred times that of the Sun. Indeed, it was long thought to be the most massive known binary system, but evidence collected between 1996 and 2005 demonstrated that Eta Carinae, which was previously thought to be a massive individual star, is a binary system.

This system is named after John Stanley Plaskett, the Canadian astronomer who discovered its binary nature in 1922. Plaskett was assisted in his observations by his son, Harry Hemley Plaskett. The pair of stars have a combined visual magnitude of 6.05, and are located in the constellation of Monoceros.

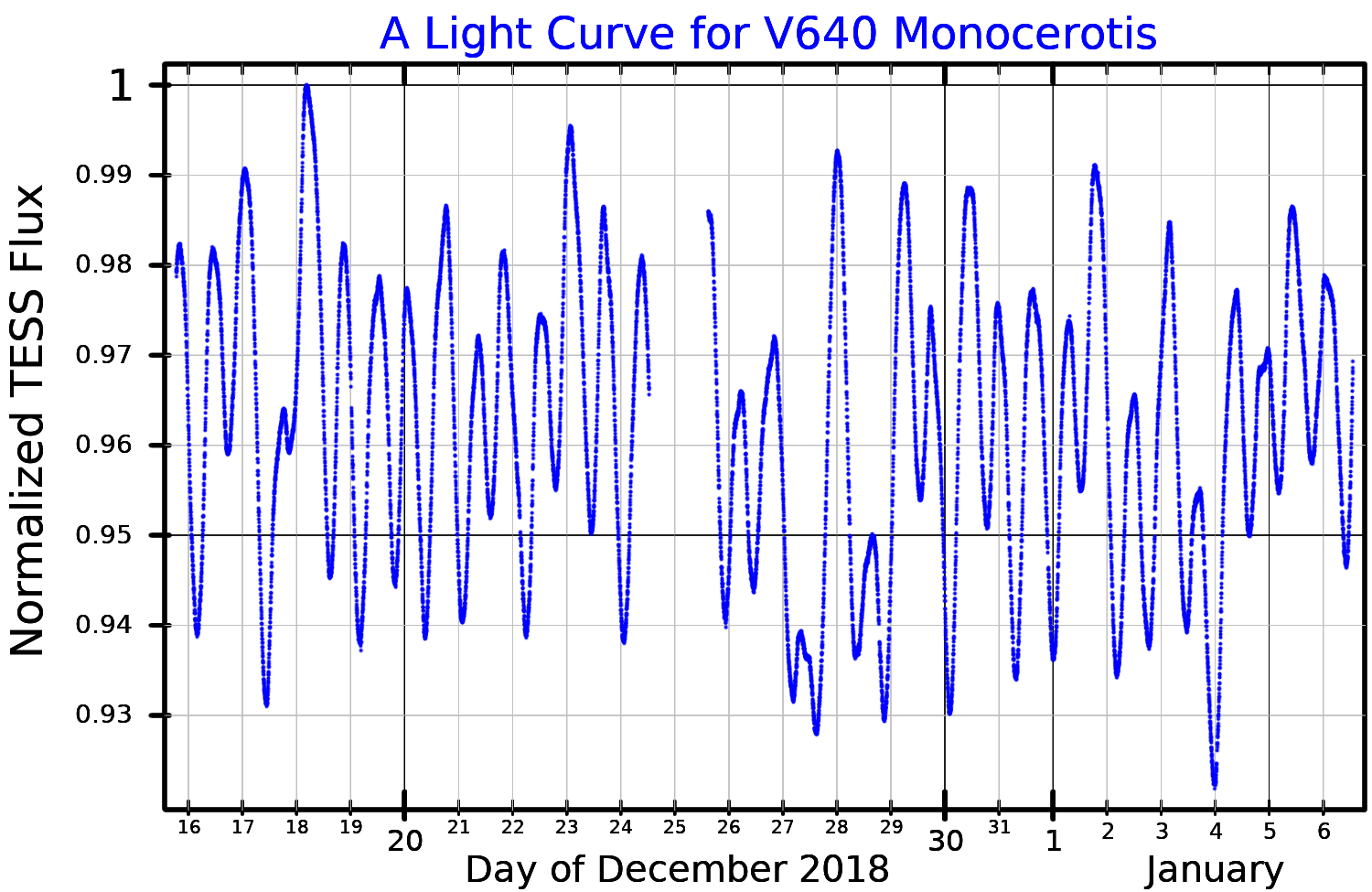
A light curve for V640 Monocerotis, plotted from TESS data

The orbital period for the pair is 14.39625±0.00095 d. The secondary is a rapid rotator with a projected rotational velocity of 300 km/s, giving it a pronounced equatorial bulge. There is a companion star at a projected angular separation of 32.29 mas, as well as two visual companions separated by and 1.12″, respectively.

The brightness varies irregularly from 6.0 to 6.1 on a timescale of a few hours, thought to be due to many factors including the binary orbit, hot spots in the colliding winds, and granulation.

The luminosities of each component, assuming membership of the Monoceros OB2 association, are much lower than expected for their spectral types. It has been suggested that the star may be further away, and not a member of the Monoceros OB2 association. The masses derived from the binary orbit are also somewhat higher than expected from the spectral types, but with considerable uncertainty due to assumptions about the inclination. The Gaia Data Release 3 parallax supports the closer distance and membership of Monoceros OB2.
