= 2905 Plaskett =

Main-belt asteroid

Discovery
- Discovered by: E. Bowell
- Discovery site: Anderson Mesa Stn.
- Discovery date: 24 January 1982

Designations
- Named after: John Stanley Plaskett; Harry Hemley Plaskett (Canadian astronomers)
- Alternative designations: 1982 BZ_{2} · 1973 FJ_{2} 1973 FP · 1978 GV_{3}
- Minor planet category: main-belt · (middle); Gefion

Orbital characteristics
- Epoch 4 September 2017 (JD 2458000.5)
- Uncertainty parameter 0
- Observation arc: 44.60 yr (16,289 days)
- Aphelion: 3.0704 AU
- Perihelion: 2.5395 AU
- Semi-major axis: 2.8049 AU
- Eccentricity: 0.0946
- Orbital period (sidereal): 4.70 yr (1,716 days)
- Mean anomaly: 122.54°
- Mean motion: 0° 12^{m} 35.28^{s} / day
- Inclination: 8.9005°
- Longitude of ascending node: 9.8462°
- Argument of perihelion: 220.04°

Physical characteristics
- Dimensions: 10.224±0.145 km
- Geometric albedo: 0.273±0.010
- Spectral type: SMASS = S
- Absolute magnitude (H): 12.0

2905 Plaskett, provisional designation 1982 BZ_{2}, is a stony Gefionian asteroid from the central regions of the asteroid belt, approximately 10 kilometers in diameter. It was discovered on 24 January 1982, by American astronomer Edward Bowell at the Anderson Mesa Station near Flagstaff, Arizona. The asteroid was named after Canadian astronomers John Stanley Plaskett and Harry Hemley Plaskett.

== Orbit and classification ==
Plaskett is a member of the Gefion family (516), a large intermediate belt family, named after 1272 Gefion. It orbits the Sun in the central main-belt at a distance of 2.5–3.1 AU once every 4 years and 8 months (1,716 days; semi-major axis of 2.80 AU). Its orbit has an eccentricity of 0.09 and an inclination of 9° with respect to the ecliptic.

The body's observation arc begins with its first observation as 1973 FP at the Crimean Astrophysical Observatory in March 1973, almost 9 years prior to its official discovery observation at Anderson Mesa.

== Physical characteristics ==
In the SMASS classification, Plaskett is a stony S-type asteroid, which corresponds to the overall spectral type of Gefionian asteroids.

=== Diameter and albedo ===
According to the survey carried out by the NEOWISE mission of NASA's Wide-field Infrared Survey Explorer, Plaskett measures 10.224 kilometers in diameter and its surface has an albedo of 0.273.

=== Rotation period ===
As of 2017, no rotational lightcurve of Plaskett has been obtained from photometric observations. The body's rotation period, shape and poles remain unknown.

== Naming ==
This minor planet was named in memory of Canadian astronomer John Stanley Plaskett (1865–1941) and his son Harry Hemley Plaskett (1893–1980). The official naming citation was published by the Minor Planet Center on 10 September 1984 (M.P.C. 9081).
