= Totenstein =

Coordinates: 50°50′N 12°47′E

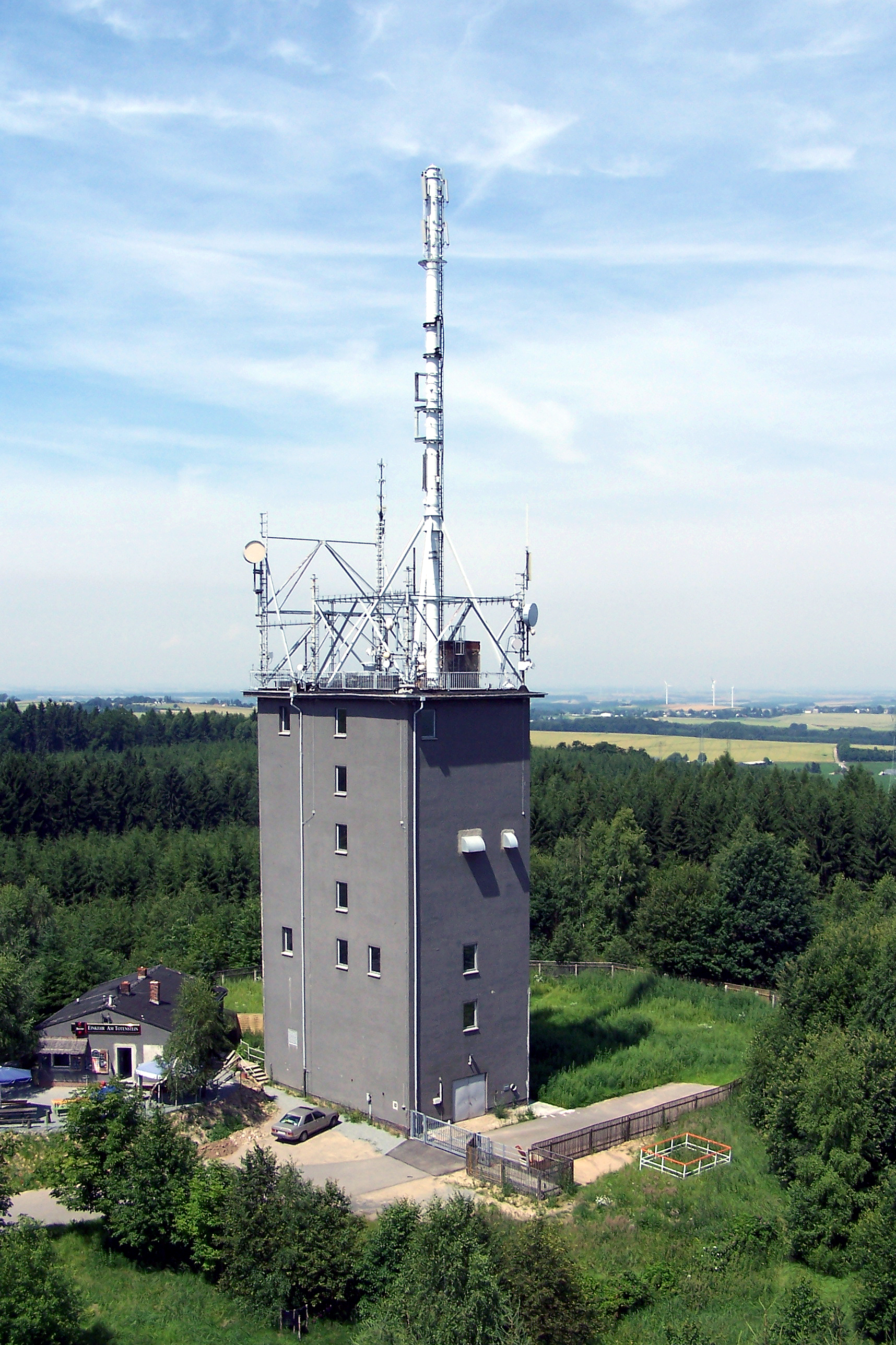
- A Tower at Totenstein

Highest point
- Elevation: 483 m (1,585 ft)

Geography
- Location: Chemnitz, Saxony, Germany

Totenstein is a mountain of Saxony, southeastern Germany.
