= Bündnis Deutschland =

Alliance Germany Bündnis Deutschland
- Abbreviation: BD
- Chairperson: Steffen Grosse
- General Secretary: None
- Presidium: Kay-Achim Schönbach, Carsten Schanz, Markus Schröder
- Founded: November 2022
- Ideology: Liberal conservatism National conservatism; Economic liberalism
- Political position: Right-wing
- Regional affiliation: Alliance for Thuringia (2024)
- Slogan: Freiheit, Wohlstand, Sicherheit ('Freedom, Prosperity, Safety')
- Bundestag: 0 / 733
- State Parliaments: 6 / 1,891
- European Parliament: 0 / 96

Website
- buendnis-deutschland.de

Bündnis Deutschland (BD, lit. 'Alliance Germany') is a minor German political party founded in November 2022. It is led by Steffen Grosse, the former leader of the Free Voters of Saxony and a former Christian Democratic Union (CDU) member. The party describes itself as "politically between" the CDU and the Alternative for Germany (AfD).

== History ==
Bündnis Deutschland was first formed in a party conference on November 20, 2022, in Fulda. Steffen Grosse would be elected as party leader.

In January 2023, member of the Landtag of Bavaria Markus Plenk would join BD. Plenk was elected as an AfD member, but had left the party in 2019. Plenk would leave BD in October 2023. Also in January 2023, a Member of the European Parliament Lars Patrick Berg left the Liberal Conservative Reformers party and joined Bündnis Deutschland.

Grosse announced plans to run in the May 2023 state-level elections in Bremen, but later decided to support the local Citizens in Rage party instead, who in turn later merged into the former. In 2024, both Wir Bürger and Values Union started to discuss mergers with BD.

The party first contested the 2024 European parliament election. It received 0.4% of the national vote (164,477 votes in total). Former independent Bundestag member Uwe Witt, who was elected from the Alternative for Germany in 2017, joined BD in late December 2024, making him his new party's first federal legislator.

In the 2025 federal election, BD ran in all federal states and candidates in 84 constituencies. The leading candidate for this election was Kay-Achim Schönbach. The party obtained 0.16% of the vote, failing to win a seat.

== Ideology and Platform ==
When BD was founded, the party declared that it would, among other things, support a social market economy, lower taxes and levies, and secure and affordable energy. In addition, according to its contract, it rules out a coalition with extremist parties.

The party supports a balanced, affordable energy mix that includes modern, safe nuclear energy as well as renewable energies and future technologies. They also call for more German energy independence. Furthermore, BD wants more local agriculture production.

BD supports for the preservation of Germany's "Christian" roots and strongly backs freedom of speech. The party also opposes "cancel culture".

BD supports resources for law enforcement, and believes that court rulings should occur faster. They also calls for more direct democracy, including expanded opportunities for referendums.

== Relationship with the AfD ==
As it was co-founded by former AfD members, Alliance Germany is said to have a latent closeness to that party. Some top officials of Alliance Germany (as of August 2023) are former members, elected officials and officials of the AfD, including the party's only member of the Bundestag, Uwe Witt.

On November 22, 2022, party leader Steffen Grosse stated that former AfD members can also be accepted if they meet the requirements for party membership. However, former members of the right-wing extremist wing (Der Flügel) are explicitly excluded.

Federal Executive Board member Jonathan Sieber distanced himself from the "populist and denigrating tone" of the AfD and made it clear that his party would not "denigrate or despise" any population groups. Regarding the cordon sanitaire with the AfD, Steffen Große said that "bridges instead of firewalls" were needed.

== Election results ==
=== Federal parliament (Bundestag) ===
Election	Leader	Constituency		Party list		Seats	+/–	Government
Election	Leader	Votes	%	Votes	%	Seats	+/–	Government
2025	Steffen Grosse	88,046	0.18 (#12)	79,012	0.16 (#14)	0 / 630	New	Extra-parliamentary

=== European Parliament ===
Election	List leader	Votes	%	Seats	+/–	EP Group
2024	Lars Patrick Berg	164,477	0.41 (#18)	0 / 96	New	–

=== State Parliaments ===
State	Year	Votes	%	Seats	±	Government
Saxony	2024	6,718	0.29 (#13)	0 / 120	N/A	Extra-parliamentary
Thuringia	2024	5,508	0.46 (#12)	0 / 88	N/A	Extra-parliamentary
Hamburg	2025	2,956	0.07 (#15)	0 / 88	N/A	Extra-parliamentary

== See also ==
- Conservatism in Germany
- List of political parties in Germany
- The Blue Party (Germany)
- Citizens for Mecklenburg-Vorpommern
