= Florian Oest =

German politician (born 1987)

Member of the Bundestag
- Incumbent
- Assumed office 25 March 2025
- Constituency: Saxony

Personal details
- Born: 25 August 1987 (age 38)
- Party: Christian Democratic Union

Florian Oest (born 25 August 1987) is a German politician who was elected as a member of the Bundestag in 2025. He has served as chairman of the Christian Democratic Union in Görlitz since 2024.
