= John Stanley Plaskett =

Canadian astronomer

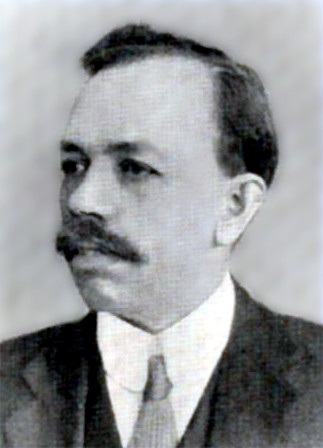
- Plaskett in 1917
- Born: November 17, 1865; Hickson, Canada West
- Died: October 17, 1941 (aged 75); Esquimalt, British Columbia, Canada
- Citizenship: Canadian
- Awards: Bruce Medal (1932); Flavelle Medal (1932)
- Scientific career
- Fields: Astronomy
- Institutions: Dominion Astrophysical Observatory

John Stanley Plaskett CBE FRS (November 17, 1865 – October 17, 1941) was a Canadian astronomer.

== Career ==
He worked as a machinist, and was offered a job as a mechanician at the Department of Physics at the University of Toronto, constructing apparatus and assisting with demonstrations during lectures. He found this so interesting that at the age of 30 he enrolled as an undergraduate in mathematics and physics. He stayed at the university until 1903, doing research on colour photography.

His formal astronomical career did not start until 1903, when he was appointed to the staff at Dominion Observatory in Ottawa, Ontario. He measured radial velocities and studied spectroscopic binaries, and performed the first detailed analysis of galactic structure. His mechanical background was very useful for constructing various instruments. He became first director of the Dominion Astrophysical Observatory in Victoria, British Columbia in 1917 (not to be confused with the old Dominion Observatory in Ottawa).

Plaskett at the Fourth Conference International Union for Cooperation in Solar Research at Mount Wilson Observatory, 1910

== Family and legacy ==
His son, Harry Hemley Plaskett, also pursued a very successful career in astronomy, winning the Gold Medal of the Royal Astronomical Society in 1963, thereby making the Plasketts one of the very few families to boast more than one Medal winner.

An authoritative biography of JS Plaskett was published in 2018, coinciding with the centennial of the Dominion Astrophysical Observatory.

== Honours ==
=== Awards ===
- Gold Medal of the Royal Astronomical Society (1930)
- Rumford Prize (1930)
- Bruce Medal (1932)
- Henry Draper Medal from the National Academy of Sciences (1934)
- CBE

=== Honors ===
- Elected International Member of the American Philosophical Society (1930)

=== Named after him ===
- NRC-HIA Plaskett Fellowship
- The crater Plaskett on the Moon
- Mount Plaskett
- the Plaskett Medal
- Asteroid 2905 Plaskett (with his son H.H. Plaskett)
- Plaskett's star
- Plaskett Place (street on which he built his home, in Esquimalt, British Columbia)
