= Sputnik (radio station) =

- Germany
- Broadcast area: Saxony; Saxony-Anhalt; Thuringia

Programming
- Language: German
- Format: Contemporary hit radio

Ownership
- Operator: Mitteldeutscher Rundfunk (MDR)
- Sister stations: MDR Sachsen; MDR Sachsen-Anhalt; MDR Thüringen – Das Radio; MDR Kultur; MDR Aktuell; MDR Jump; MDR Klassik; MDR Schlagerwelt; MDR Tweens

History
- First air date: 16 May 1964 (as DT64); 1 May 1993 (as Sputnik)
- Former names: DT64 (1964–1993)

Links
- Webcast: Listen Live
- Website: Official website

Sputnik or MDR Sputnik is a youth-oriented German radio station, and is part of Leipzig-based public broadcaster Mitteldeutscher Rundfunk (MDR), based in Halle. The station, which primarily broadcasts pop and rock music, is the successor to the East German youth station DT64, founded in 1964 on the occasion of the Deutschlandtreffen der Jugend. It was given its present name on 1 May 1993, following German reunification in 1990; the new name, inspired by the Soviet Sputnik satellite, was the suggestion of the then Minister-President of Saxony, Kurt Biedenkopf.

== Broadcasting ==
While DT64 was broadcast throughout East Germany, Sputnik is available on FM only in one of the five federal states which replaced the GDR and thus only in one of the three federal states that form MDR's coverage area (Saxony-Anhalt); it is available throughout Europe via the Astra satellite on 19.2° east in DVB-S standard as well as on most German cable networks on DVB-C and in the MDR area (Saxony, Saxony-Anhalt, and Thuringia) on FM and on DAB+.

DT64 lost all FM frequencies in the first half of 1992. In four new federal states these frequencies were given to private radio stations, in Berlin and Brandenburg a new public youth radio station (Rock Radio B, later Fritz) started on the frequencies of DT64. DT64 had to switch to AM in summer 1992. AM transmissions lasted for one year. The station was renamed MDR Sputnik. Between 1993 and 1997 MDR Sputnik was available only via Astra satellite analog audio subcarriers and a special German digital Radio System DSR, receivable via cable and satellite. In 1997 FM coverage in Saxony-Anhalt was increased. The station lost most of its news and spoken word content.

== Programming ==
In December 2006, the station was relaunched as a high quality youth station, under new station manager Eric Markuse. English news bulletins were added between 1.30 P.M. and 6.30 P.M. Various other news content returned, as well as more diverse music, especially independent music.

In summer 2010 MDR cut its budget again: English news and most news content ceased, station manager Eric Markuse left. Today (2014) Sputnik is a standard music station.

== Online ==
Sputnik also operates an internet radio station, Sputnik.de, which has channels for Electronic Music, melancholic music, R&B, dance, rock music, and a stream broadcasting the alternative evening programme Popkult all day.

== See also ==
- Eastern Bloc information dissemination
- FM4
- Triple J
