= Brocken Transmitter =

Towers in Germany

Coordinates: 51.8005°N 10.6141°E

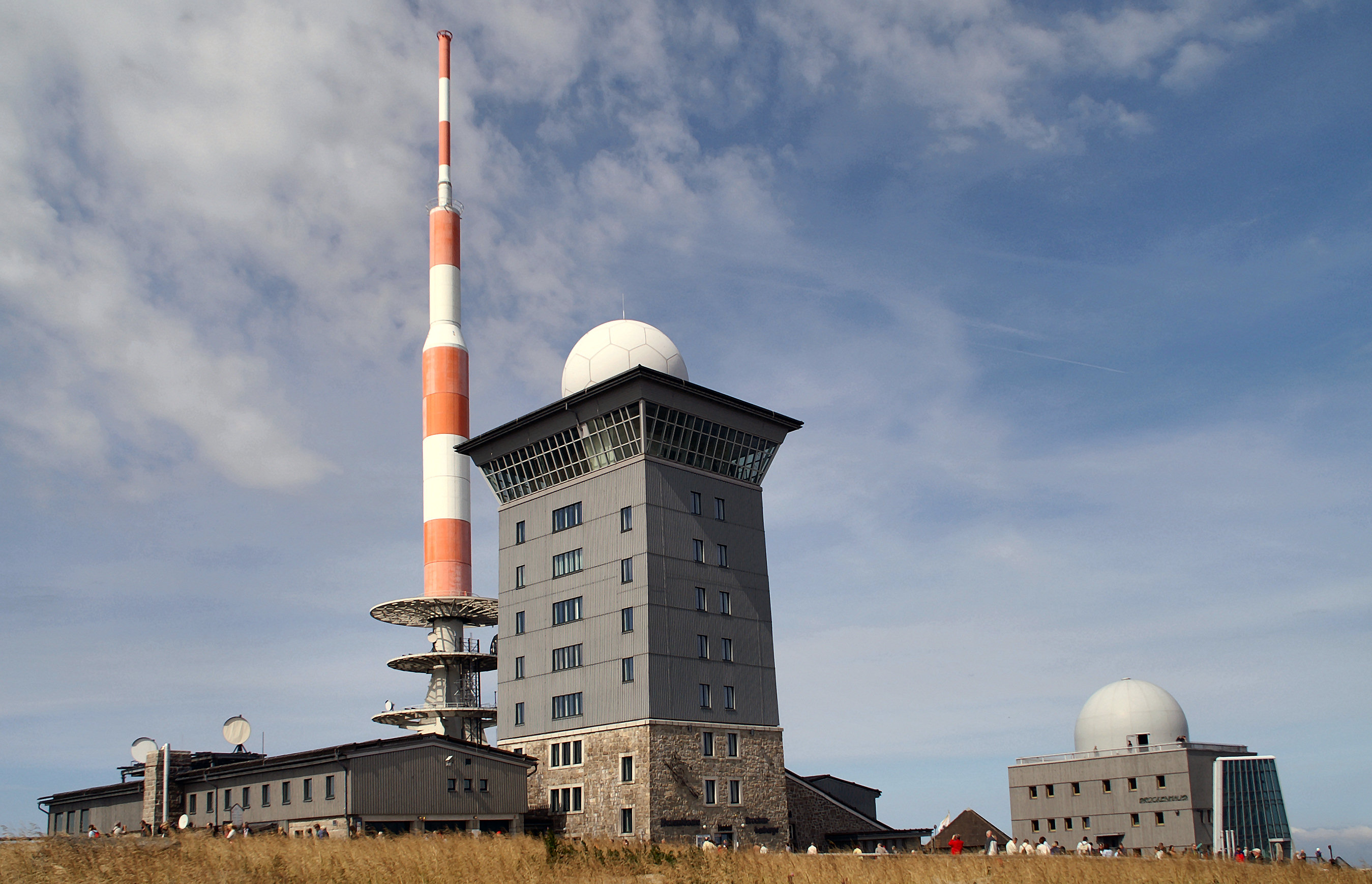
Old (foreground) and new (background) transmission tower on the Brocken

The Brocken Transmitter (German: Sender Brocken), property of Deutsche Telekom, is a facility for FM- and TV-transmitters on the Brocken, the highest mountain in Northern Germany. The facility includes two transmission towers. The old tower was built between 1936 and 1937, a 95 m antenna Mast above the building 53 metres high, which is since a hotel, replaced by a radome holding air traffic control radar equipment, in the first half of the 1990s, the transmitting aerial of the old tower was removed and replaced, and has an observation deck, which can be reached by elevator. This tower was intended to be used after 1939 for TV transmissions to central Germany, but due to the beginning of World War II, it was transformed into a radar facility. Unlike most modern TV towers, the old tower looked like a block of flats with a square cross section. The arrangement of the windows in the observation deck is similar to those in the restaurant in the Radio tower Berlin.

In 1973 a 176 m high TV tower was built on Brocken with a free standing Antenna of Steel tube 123 m high, standing above a 53 m podium of reinforcement concrete with 4 legs and 3 platforms decks, constructed at same level of the hotel base, round for communication devices, shafts for cable and stairways for personnel access and directional radio transmission aerials, not accessible to the public. Later on 2007 the Antenna was reduced to 115.34 m high, making all tower a 168 m tall structure.

While Germany was divided into East and West, the Brocken transmitter was used for TV and FM-transmissions, even though it lay in the restricted area of the east-west frontier (on the Eastern Side). Its location so close to the border enabled it to be received in parts of the West.

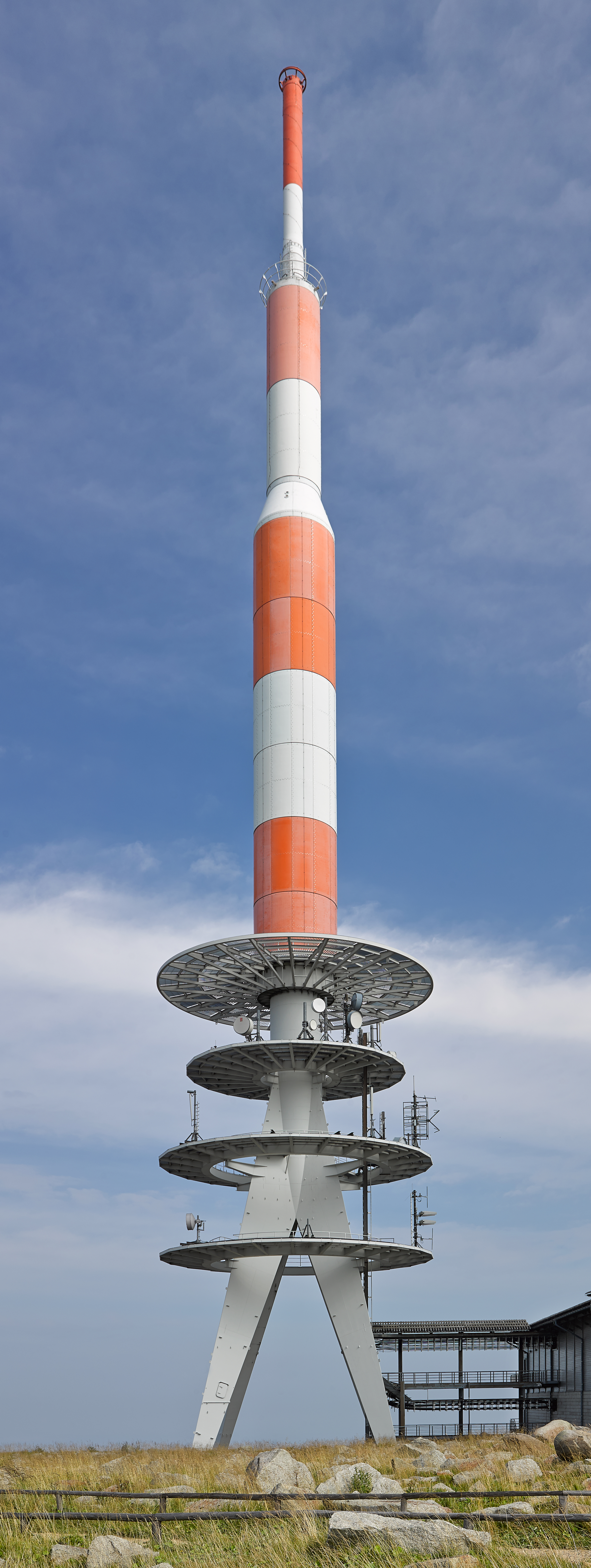
New radio tower

== Signals transmitted from Brocken ==
=== Digital television ===
- ARD-MDR1 HD (DVB-T2), UHF channel 45 (vertical) 50 kW
- ARD-MDR2 HD (DVB-T2), UHF channel 34 (vertical) 50 kW
- ZDF HD (DVB-T2), UHF channel 37 (vertical) 50 kW

=== Analogue television (formerly) ===
- Das Erste (originally DFF1), VHF channel E6 (Horizontal) 100 kW
- ZDF, UHF channel 49 500 kW
- MDR Fernsehen (originally DFF2), UHF channel 34 (Horizontal) 1000 kW

=== FM radio ===
- MDR Sachsen-Anhalt, 94.6 MHz (60 kW)
- MDR Jump, 91.5 MHz (100 kW)
- MDR Kultur, 107.8 MHz (10 kW)
- Deutschlandfunk Kultur, 97.4 MHz (100 kW)
- 89.0 RTL, 89.0 MHz (60 kW)
- Radio SAW, 101.4 MHz (100 kW)

== See also ==
- List of Towers
