= Mitteldeutscher Rundfunk =

Public broadcaster for the German states of Thuringia, Saxony, and Saxony-Anhalt

- Type: Broadcast radio, television and online
- Country: Germany
- Headquarters: Leipzig, Germany
- Area: Thuringia, Saxony and Saxony-Anhalt
- Key people: Karola Wille, Intendant
- Launch date: 1 March 1924 (MIRAG); 31 may 1991 (MDR)
- Official website: mdr.de

Mitteldeutscher Rundfunk (pronounced [ˈmɪtl̩ˌdɔʏtʃɐ ˈʁʊntfʊŋk]; "Central German Broadcasting"), shortened to MDR (pronounced [ˌɛmdeːˈʔɛʁ]; stylized as mdr), is the public broadcaster for the federal states of Thuringia, Saxony and Saxony-Anhalt in Germany. Established in January 1991, its headquarters are in Leipzig, with regional studios in Dresden, Erfurt and Magdeburg. MDR is a member of the ARD consortium of public broadcasters in Germany.

MDR broadcasts its own television channel to the three states it serves and also contributes programming to the first German TV channel (Das Erste), and broadcasts a number of radio channels.

== History ==
=== Origins ===
MIRAG Logo (1924)

The Mitteldeutsche Rundfunk AG (MIRAG) was founded on 22 January 1924 in Leipzig. It aired its first program on 1 March 1924 at 14:30 CET.

During the Gleichschaltung in the Nazi era, the MIRAG was transferred to the "Reichssender Leipzig" in 1934.

After the end of the Second World War, the Soviet Military Administration in Germany temporarily licensed "Radio Leipzig" in 1945, which only existed for a few months until the Mitteldeutscher Rundfunk was founded again. In 1946 the new program "Mitteldeutscher Rundfunk, Sender Leipzig" started in the Springerstrasse broadcasting house.

In September 1952, the "Sender Leipzig" program was converted to the "Berlin III" entertainment program. In 1956 the regional program of Radio DDR (English: Radio GDR), "Sender Leipzig", was introduced.

MDR's logo after German reunification

On 31 May 1991, Mitteldeutscher Rundfunk (MDR) was founded as public broadcaster serving Saxony, Saxony-Anhalt and Thuringia, and became a member of ARD. MDR began their first television transmission immediately after DFF's final closedown on midnight of New Year's Day 1992.

In August 2022 Ines Hoge-Lorenz, the managing director of the regional state branch of Saxony-Anhalt of the MDR was sacked because of her family ties to a corruption scandal ten years ago.

== Studios and staff ==
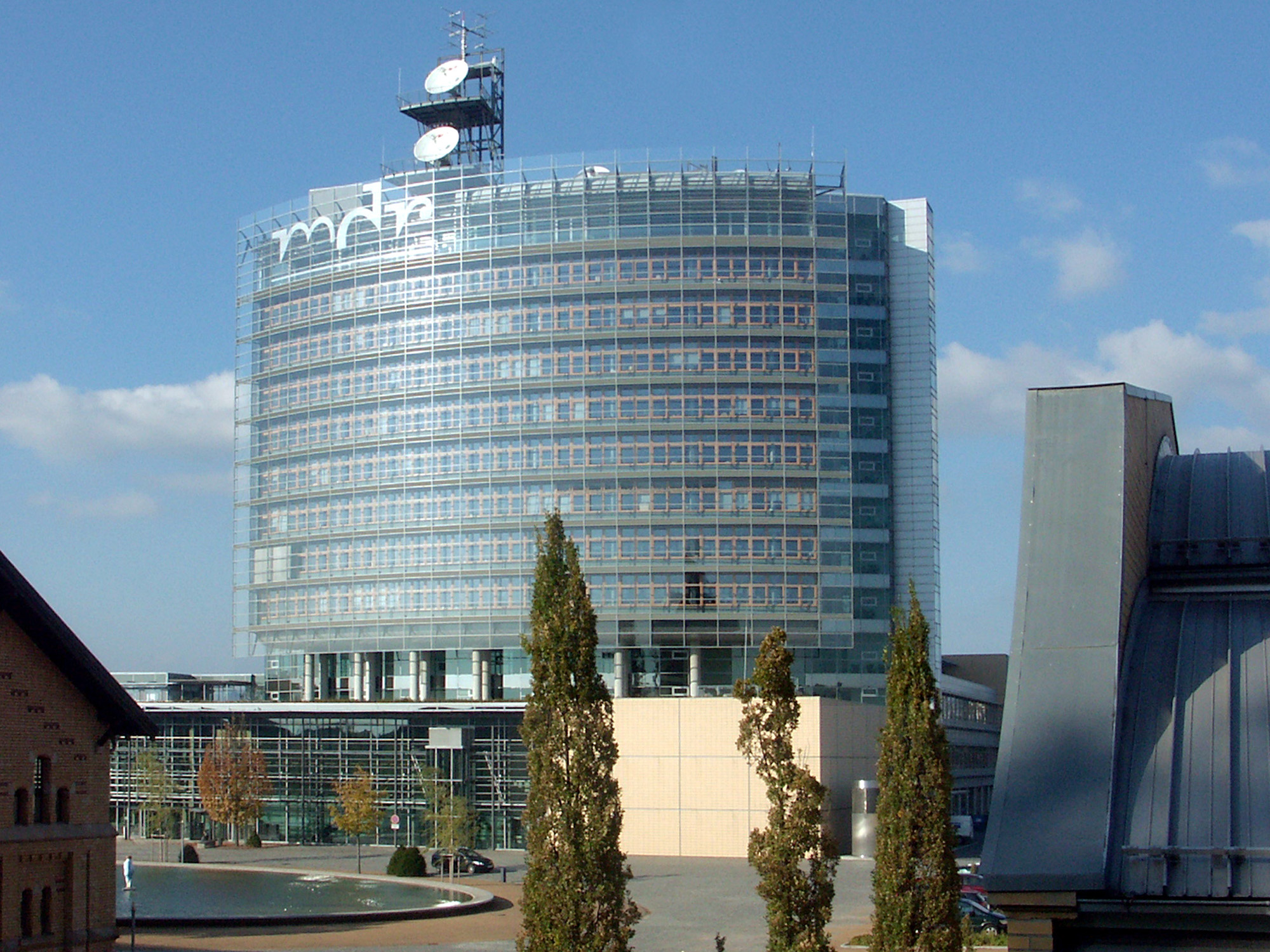
MDR headquarters in Leipzig

MDR has approximately 2,000 employees. The main television studio is in Leipzig, and the main radio studio is in Halle. There are also radio and TV studios in each of the three state capitals for the territory that MDR represents: Dresden (Saxony), Erfurt (Thuringia), and Magdeburg (Saxony-Anhalt).

== Finances ==
In 2012 87% of MDR's total annual income of €684,529,979 was derived from the licence fees payable by all households at the rate of €18.36 (per month). These fees are not collected directly by MDR but by the Beitragsservice ("fee collection service") owned jointly by ARD (and its members), the second television network ZDF, and the national radio broadcaster Deutschlandradio.

== TV and radio channels ==
MDR produces programming independently and in collaboration with other broadcasters, for transmission by a number of television and radio networks.

=== Television channels ===
- MDR Fernsehen – third TV channel for central Germany, with regional programming for Saxony, Saxony-Anhalt and Thuringia

MDR also contributes programming to the following:

- Das Erste – Germany's main public TV network
- Phoenix – a station mainly broadcasting documentaries, special events and discussions, jointly run by ARD and ZDF
- KiKa – children's network jointly run by ARD and ZDF (of which MDR has primary responsibility)
- arte – a Franco-German cultural channel
- 3sat – cultural network from ARD, ZDF, ORF (Austrian Broadcasting), and SRG (Swiss Broadcasting)

=== Radio channels ===
- MDR Sachsen (MDR Saxony) – Variety music and regional programming for Saxony
- MDR Sachsen-Anhalt (MDR Saxony-Anhalt) – regional programming for Saxony-Anhalt
- MDR Thüringen – Das Radio (MDR Thuringia) – regional programming for Thuringia
- MDR Jump – pop music (Hot AC)
- MDR Kultur – culture & spoken word programming and regional classical music
- MDR Aktuell – 24-hour news and information (AM broadcasts ceased on 30 April 2013)
- MDR Sputnik – youth oriented music station. Formerly DT64 cultural youth channel of East German broadcasting organisation. (FM in Saxony-Anhalt only, internet, DAB+ elsewhere)
- MDR Klassik (DAB+ and internet streaming only) – classical music, scheduled to close by end of 2026
- MDR Schlagerwelt (DAB+ and internet streaming only) – schlager music and easy listening scheduled to close by end of 2026
- MDR Tweens (DAB+ and internet streaming only) – children's programming

== Musical organizations ==
The MDR operates two musical organizations and a ballet corps.

The MDR Symphony Orchestra (German: MDR Sinfonieorchester) was founded in 1915 as "Orchester des Konzertvereins" ("Orchestra of the Concert Society"). It became the "Rundfunk-Sinfonieorchester Leipzig" ("Radio Symphony Orchestra Leipzig") in 1924. Principal conductors have included Herbert Kegel, Wolf-Dieter Hauschild, Daniel Nazareth and Fabio Luisi. Since September 2007, Jun Märkl is the orchestra's principal conductor.

The later MDR Rundfunkchor (MDR radio choir) was founded in 1946 as the Rundfunkchor Leipzig ("Leipzig Radio Choir").

The MDR managed MDR TV Ballet (German: MDR Fernsehballett), the only TV ballet company in Europe. It was founded in 1962 as DFF-Fernsehballet, reorganized in 1992, and has 30 members. MDR sold the Ballet in 2012. It's now known as Deutsches Fernsehballett.

== Transmitters ==
MDR does not own its own transmission towers. They are owned and operated by Deutsche Telekom.

=== Podcasts ===
Several podcasts produced by MDR are available through the iTunes Music Store and via RSS. They are essentially repeats of regular radio programmes, including: "Figaro," "MDR Info," "Programming Highlights," "Riverboat," "Sputnik" and "Unter uns."

== Administration ==
The managing directors of MDR:

- 1991 to 2011 Udo Reiter, founding director of MDR
- 2011 to 2023 Karola Wille
- up from November 2023 Ralf Ludwig

== Popular MDR productions ==
MDR produces several programs for the ARD, including crime drama episodes for the series Tatort ("Crime Scene") and Polizeiruf 110 ("Police Emergency 110"). MDR also produces the successful hospital series In aller Freundschaft ("In friendship") and the animal series Abenteuer Zoo ("Adventure Zoo"), Deutschlands wilde Tiere ("Germany's Wild Animals") and Europas wilder Osten ("Europe's Wild East"). MDR also has the primary responsibility for the children's TV channel KiKa headquartered in Erfurt, which has amassed a cult following in Germany and internationally due to their mascot Bernd das Brot, a chronically depressed loaf of bread which appears in the KiKa late-night loop.

== See also ==
- German television
- List of tallest buildings in Leipzig
