= MDR Jump =

German public radio station

- Im Osten zu Hause (At home in the east)
- Germany
- Broadcast area: Saxony; Saxony-Anhalt; Thuringia

Programming
- Language: German
- Format: Current-based AC

Ownership
- Operator: Mitteldeutscher Rundfunk (MDR)
- Sister stations: MDR Sachsen; MDR Sachsen-Anhalt; MDR Thüringen – Das Radio; MDR Kultur; MDR Aktuell; MDR Sputnik; MDR Klassik; MDR Schlagerwelt; MDR Tweens

History
- First air date: 1 January 2000
- Former names: Jump FM (2000); Jump (2000–2011)

Technical information
- Transmitter coordinates: 51°18′56″N 12°23′2″E

Links
- Webcast: Listen live
- Website: mdrjump.de

MDR Jump is a German public radio station owned and operated by the Mitteldeutscher Rundfunk (MDR). It broadcasts a current-based AC format. As of 2025, it has more than 1.1 million daily listeners.

== History ==
As the successor of MDR Life, MDR Jump started broadcasting on 1 January 2000, initially with a programme mainly directed at the 14–29-year-old age bracket, similar to sister station MDR Sputnik. Due to diminishing listenership, this approach was reevaluated and changed to instead appeal to 20–49-year-olds in August 2011. The new programming put a stronger focus on information more specifically tailored to its regional audience, as well as an expanded selection basis for its range of featured music, which now also included songs from the two previous decades, rather than just the current Top 40. This new direction proved to be successful; as of 2019, MDR Jump is the seventeenth most popular radio station in Germany. Within the territory of former East Germany, it is only surpassed by MDR Sachsen.

== Programme ==
The regular programming of MDR Jump is broadcast Monday to Friday from 5 o'clock to midnight and on weekends and holidays from 6 o'clock to midnight. During the remaining time, SWR3's shared overnight programme ARD-Popnacht is aired.

Monday to Friday

- 5 a.m. – MDR JUMP Morningshow
- 10 a.m. – MDR JUMP Bei der Arbeit
- 2 p.m. – Die MDR JUMP Feierabendshow
- 7 p.m. – MDR JUMP Die Themen des Tages
- 8 p.m. – MDR JUMP Am Abend
- 12 p.m. – ARD-Popnacht

Saturday

- 6 a.m. – MDR JUMP am Morgen
- 11 a.m. – MDR JUMP am Wochenende
- 4 p.m. – MDR JUMP am Samstagabend
- 9 p.m. – MDR JUMP In The Mix
- 12 p.m. – ARD-Popnacht

Sunday

- 6 a.m. – MDR JUMP am Morgen
- 11 a.m. – MDR JUMP am Wochenende
- 4 p.m. – MDR JUMP am Abend
- 10 p.m. – MDR JUMP – Rockchannel
- 12 p.m. – ARD-Popnacht

=== MDR JUMP Morningshow ===
A daily morningshow has been on the air since 2006. Since 2011, it has been moderated by Sarah von Neuburg and Lars-Christian Karde. Apart from the station's usual selection of music, this show frequently hosts various call-in segments, usually centred around some type of prize competition, as well as segments produced by external contributors. As of 2020, the regularly featured segments include, but are not limited to:

- Böttchers Tagebuch – Notizen aus der Provinz: Comedian Thomas Böttcher shares his take on current events.
- Der MDR JUMP Wortinspektor: An elderly man with a speech impediment explains a word.
- Fakt oder Fake: A commonly held belief is tested for its veracity.
- Jogis Eleven: Soschäl Netwörk: The head coach of the Germany national football team has a chat with a selection of players.
