= 1272 Gefion =

Main-belt asteroid

Discovery
- Discovered by: K. Reinmuth
- Discovery site: Heidelberg Obs.
- Discovery date: 10 October 1931

Designations
- Pronunciation: /ˈɡeɪfiɒn/ or /ˈɡɛfiɒn/
- Named after: Gefjon (Norse mythology)
- Alternative designations: 1931 TZ_{1} · A917 SF
- Minor planet category: main-belt · (middle); Gefion
- Adjectives: Gefionian /ɡɛfiˈoʊniən/

Orbital characteristics
- Epoch 4 September 2017 (JD 2458000.5)
- Uncertainty parameter 0
- Observation arc: 99.50 yr (36,344 days)
- Aphelion: 3.2076 AU
- Perihelion: 2.3604 AU
- Semi-major axis: 2.7840 AU
- Eccentricity: 0.1521
- Orbital period (sidereal): 4.65 yr (1,697 days)
- Mean anomaly: 215.36°
- Mean motion: 0° 12^{m} 43.92^{s} / day
- Inclination: 8.4185°
- Longitude of ascending node: 321.56°
- Argument of perihelion: 3.6671°

Physical characteristics
- Dimensions: 6.965±0.169 km 7.016±0.066 km 12.62 km (calculated)
- Synodic rotation period: 2.900±0.0012 h 3.087±0.0005 h
- Geometric albedo: 0.057 (assumed); 0.2489±0.0256; 0.252±0.041
- Spectral type: SMASS = Sl; C (assumed)
- Absolute magnitude (H): 12.785±0.005 (R) · 12.9 · 13.0 · 13.01±0.21 · 13.22

1272 Gefion, provisional designation 1931 TZ_{1}, is a stony asteroid and parent body of the Gefion family from the central region of the asteroid belt, approximately 7 kilometers in diameter. It was discovered on 10 October 1931, by astronomer Karl Reinmuth at the Heidelberg Observatory in Germany. The asteroid was named after Gefjon from Norse mythology.

== Orbit and classification ==
Gefion is the namesake and parent body of the Gefion family (516), a large family of stony asteroids in the intermediate main belt. The family is also a suspected source of the L chondrites, common group of meteorites.

It orbits the Sun in the central main-belt at a distance of 2.4–3.2 AU once every 4 years and 8 months (1,697 days; semi-major axis of 2.78 AU). Its orbit has an eccentricity of 0.15 and an inclination of 8° with respect to the ecliptic.

The asteroid was first identified as A917 SF at Heidelberg in September 1917. The body's observation arc begins at Heidelberg, six days after its official discovery observation.

== Physical characteristics ==
In the SMASS classification, Gefion is a Sl-subtype that transitions from the common stony S-type asteroids to the rather rare L-types.

=== Rotation period ===
In 2010 and 2011, two rotational lightcurves of Gefion were obtained from photometric observations in the R-band by astronomers at the Palomar Transient Factory in California . Lightcurve analysis gave a rotation period of 2.900 and 3.087 hours with a brightness amplitude of 0.22 and 0.20 magnitude, respectively (U=2/2).

=== Diameter and albedo ===
According to the survey carried out by the NEOWISE mission of NASA's Wide-field Infrared Survey Explorer, Gefion measures between 6.965 and 7.016 kilometers in diameter and its surface has an albedo between 0.2489 and 0.252. The Collaborative Asteroid Lightcurve Link assumes a standard albedo for carbonaceous asteroids of 0.057 and consequently calculates a much larger diameter of 12.62 kilometers based on an absolute magnitude of 13.22.

== Naming ==
This minor planet was named after Gefjon a goddess in Norse mythology. It is also named for the Gefion Fountain in Copenhagen, Denmark. The official naming citation was mentioned in The Names of the Minor Planets by Paul Herget in 1955 (H 117).
