= Harry Hemley Plaskett =

Canadian astronomer

Harry Hemley Plaskett FRS (July 5, 1893 – January 26, 1980) was a Canadian astronomer who made significant contributions to the fields of solar physics, astronomical spectroscopy and spectrophotometry. From 1932 to 1960, he served as the Savilian Professor of Astronomy at the University of Oxford, and in 1963 was awarded the Gold Medal of the Royal Astronomical Society.

== Life ==
Harry Hemley Plaskett was born in Toronto, Ontario on July 5, 1893. His parents were Rebecca Hemley and John Stanley Plaskett, who at the time was working as a machinist in the Department of Physics at the University of Toronto, but who would later go on to become the first director of the Dominion Astrophysical Observatory in Victoria, and a Gold Medal winner in his own right.

After receiving his B.A. from Toronto in 1916, he joined the Canadian Corps, serving in the field artillery in France from 1917-1918. Following this, and a year spent working with Professor Alfred Fowler at Imperial College, he returned to Canada, and was appointed to the staff of the Dominion Astrophysical Observatory in Victoria, B.C. In 1928, he was appointed Professor of Astrophysics at Harvard University, and in 1932 succeeded H. H. Turner as Savilian Professor of Astronomy at the University of Oxford. In May, 1936 he was elected a Fellow of the Royal Society. He was president of the Royal Astronomical Society just after World War II.

His time at Oxford was interrupted by war service: from 1939 to 1940, he was an anti-aircraft officer, and from 1940 to 1944 he worked on experimental navigation for the Ministry of Aircraft Production. From 1951 to 1955 he worked alongside Walter Stibbs.

He retired from Oxford in 1960, becoming a Professor Emeritus of the university, but remained active in astronomical research almost until the end of his life.

== Family ==
He had married in 1921 Edith Alice Smith, with whom he had two children, Barbara and John Stanley. They were to remain married until his death in 1980.

== Honors ==
The asteroid 2905 Plaskett, discovered by Edward Bowell in 1982, was named in his and his father's memory.
