= Großer Inselsberg =

Peak in the Thuringian Forest

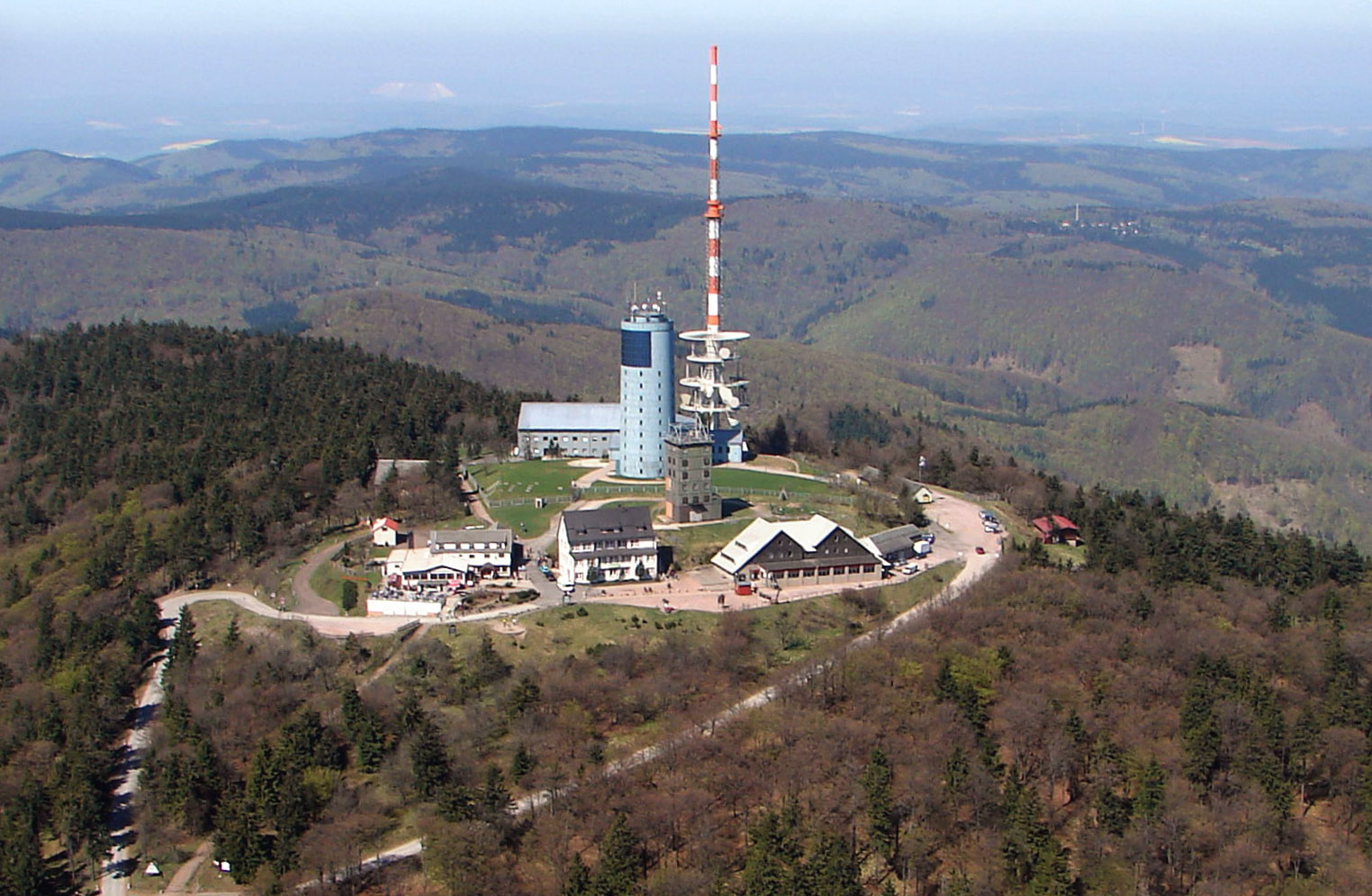

Highest point
- Elevation: 916.5 m above sea level (NN) (3,007 ft)
- Prominence: 228 m (748 ft)
- Isolation: 27.3 km (17.0 mi)
- Coordinates: 50°51′04″N 10°27′57″E

Geography
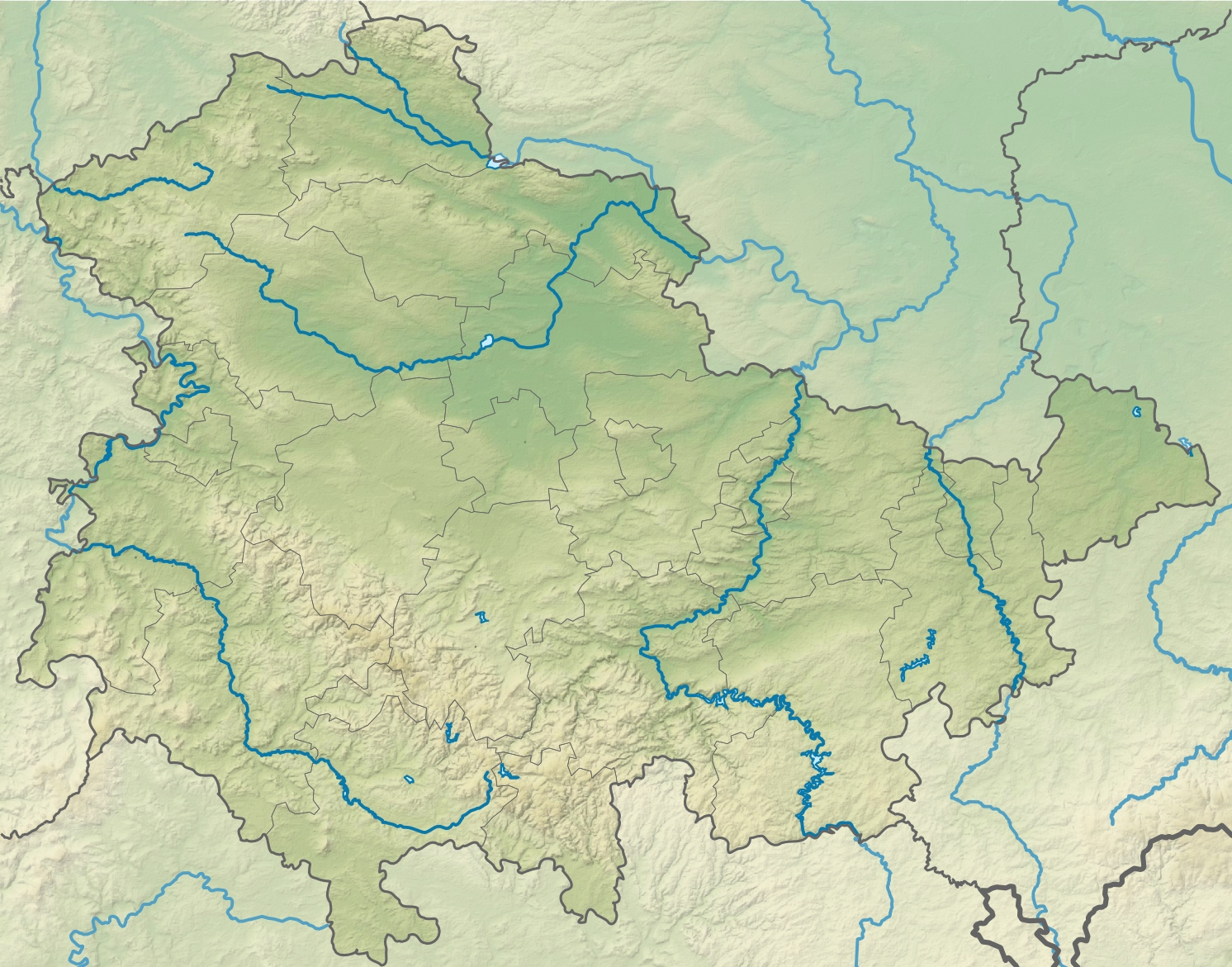
- Location within Thuringia
- Location: Thuringia, Germany
- Parent range: Thuringian Forest

Großer Inselsberg is a mountain in the Thuringian Forest with a height of 916.5 m (3,007 ft) above sea level, located on Rennsteig in the districts of Gotha and Schmalkalden-Meiningen. It is the fourth-highest distinct mountain of Thuringia, after Großer Beerberg (982.9 m (3,225 ft)), Schneekopf (978 m (3,209 ft)) and Großer Finsterberg (944.1 m (3,097 ft)) and forms a landmark that can be viewed in particular from northern and western directions.

== Geography ==
The summit of Großer Inselsberg is located about 3.2 km (2.0 mi) NNE of Brotterode and 4 km (2.5 mi) southwest of Bad Tabarz. It forms a narrow, arched plateau of about 700 m (2,300 ft) length. The steep slopes are marked by deep dents and spurs formed by weathering.

The summit has a dominance radius of 27.3 km (17.0 mi) extending to Sommerbachskopf (941.5 m (3,089 ft) a.s.l.) and a prominence of 228 m (748 ft) relative to the saddle at Heuberghaus.

With the exception of the buildings, the summit region of Großer Inselsberg has been a nature reserve since 30 March 1961.

== Geology ==
Großer Inselsberg is a rhyolitic butte that has withstood the weathering of the surrounding softer rock layers. The near-surface rocks of the summit region belong to the lower vulcanites of the Oberhof sequence in the lower Rotliegend and crop out in Reitsteine, a steep escarpment southeast of the summit. They are embedded in the conglomerates, sandstones and siltstones of the Goldlauter sequence to the north and the grainy gneiss of Cambrian origin to the south. An abrupt transition between the Inselsberg rhyolite and the gneiss can be observed along the west–east Inselsberg fault.

== Flora ==
The potential natural vegetation of the mountain is a beech forest, on the northern slope with an undergrowth of heath bedstraw, on the sunny southern side with woodrush. Some near-natural beech forests are preserved on the southern and the northeastern slope. The common spruce has been introduced through silviculture. The once indigenous silver fir has disappeared. Other naturally occurring tree species include sycamore, Norway maple, ash, elm, sessile oak, pedunculate oak, silver birch, alder, larch, goat willow, and wild cherry.

== Name ==
The name is popularly ascribed to the solitary aspect of Großer Inselsberg and is said to be derived from German einzeln ("solitary") or Insel (Island), but is probably derived from a stream called Emse or in the Middle Ages Enze which has its source on the northwestern slope of the mountain.

== Tourism ==
The mountain is one of the best known excursion destinations in Thuringia. Its summit is crossed by the traditional mountain path Rennsteig, whose route is shared here by the European long-distance hiking path E3 and the international mountain hiking path Eisenach–Budapest (EB). A road facilitating access to the summit branches off the state road 1024 between Brotterode and Tabarz, and parking spaces are provided. A youth hostel, a restaurant and an outlook tower serve tourists.
