= Tina Hassel =

German broadcast journalist (born 1964)

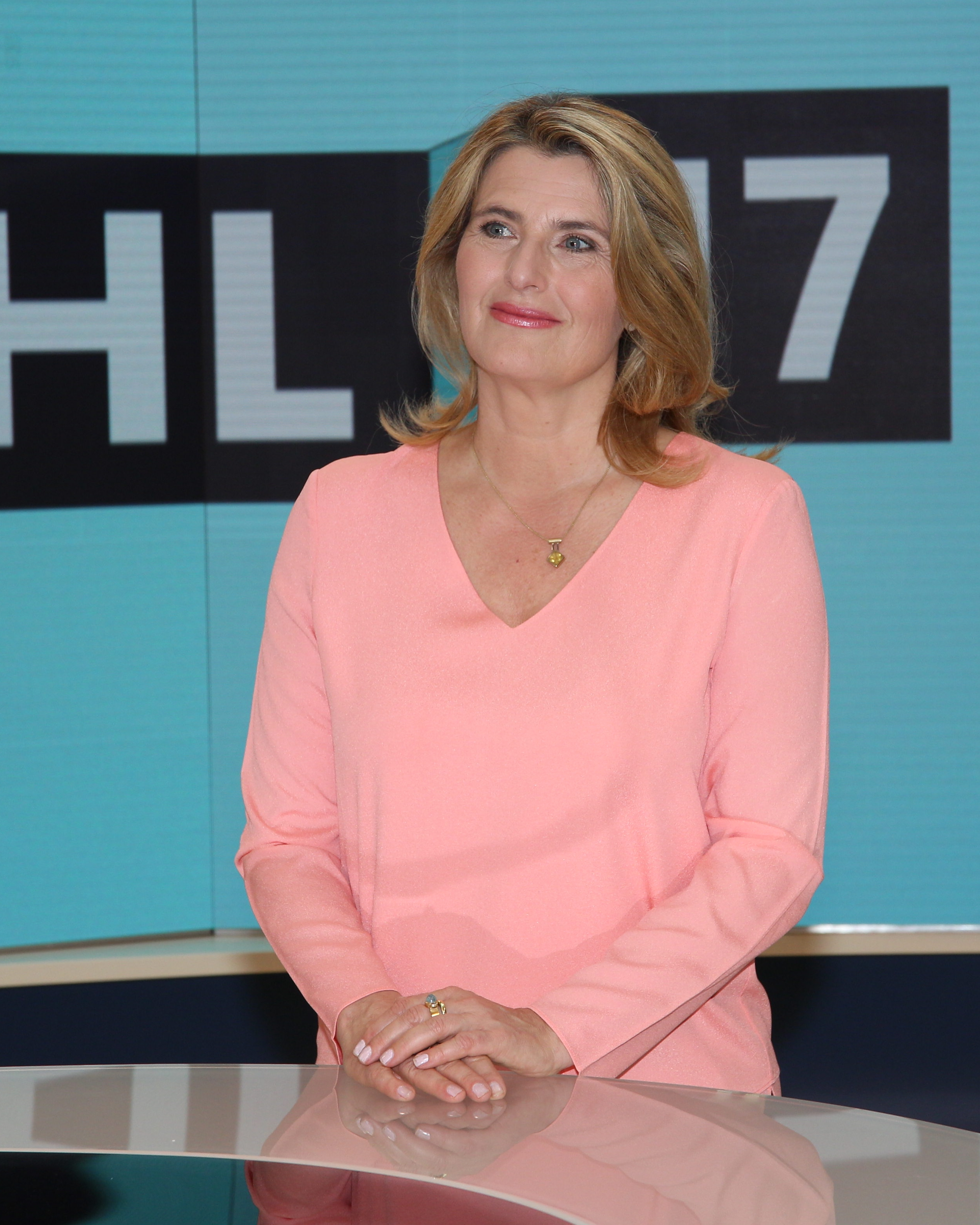
Hassel in the studio in 2017

Tina Hassel (born 11 May 1964) is a German broadcast journalist. Since July 2015 she has been director of the capital studio of ARD, the German public broadcasting association.

== Early life and education ==
Born in Cologne, Hassel studied at the universities of Cologne and Bordeaux and earned a Magister degree in Germanic studies, history and political science.

== Career ==
While still a student, Hassel began working for radio and TV stations in Germany and France.

Hassel worked at Westdeutscher Rundfunk (WDR) from 1990 to 1994, initially as a volunteer and then starting in 1992 as an editor and presenter. From 1994 to 1999, she was the Brussels and then Paris correspondent of WDR's parent organization ARD. From November 2001 to May 2012, she was a presenter on Weltspiegel, the world news program on ARD's Das Erste TV channel. In addition, in December 2001 she became foreign head at WDR. She then headed ARD's studio in Washington, DC from July 2012 to June 2015.

On 1 July 2015, Hassel succeeded Ulrich Deppendorf as director and chief television editor at the ARD capital studio in Berlin, the first woman to hold the position. In this capacity, she is along Matthias Deiß also the presenter of Bericht aus Berlin (Report from Berlin). Among others, she has interviewed Prime Minister Theresa May (2018) and Chancellor Angela Merkel (2020, and 2021).

In 2021 Hassel ran for the election of ZDF director, but when it became clear that she lacked the necessary votes, she withdrew her candidacy.

== Criticism ==
In January 2018, while reporting for ARD on the Alliance 90/The Greens party convention, Hassel tweeted in a manner that was criticized as lacking in neutrality. Michael Hanfeld of the Frankfurter Allgemeine Zeitung characterized the tweets as "a salvo of delighted squeals", Alexander Will in Nordwest-Zeitung, as part of a "massive media flanking action" for the party, and Jochen Bittner of Die Zeit took her to task for lacking the "professional, dispassionate distance" that ought particularly to be demonstrated by publicly financed, government-supported media. Hassel rejected the accusation that the tweets had been insufficiently neutral.

== Personal life ==
Hassel is married and has three children. She is a patron of Kinderhospiz Bethel, a children's hospice in Bielefeld, and is a member of Atlantik-Brücke.
