= ARD-Hauptstadtstudio =

Coordinates: 52°31′08″N 13°22′51″E

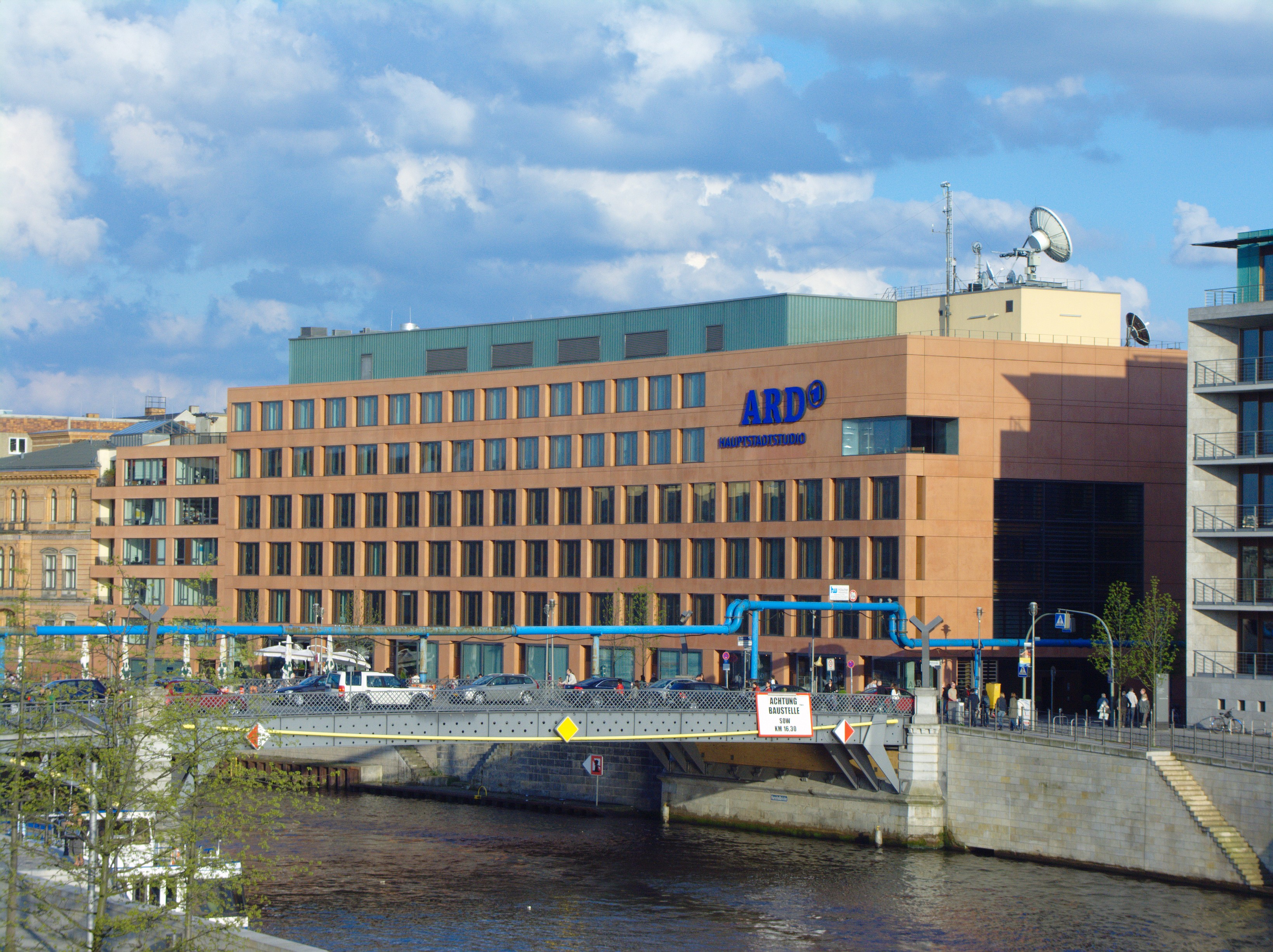
- ARD-Hauptstadtstudio

General information
- Type: Broadcasting Center
- Location: Wilhelmstrasse, Mitte, Berlin
- Completed: 16 April 1999
- Owner: ARD

ARD-Hauptstadtstudio (ARD Capital Studio) is a television studio in Berlin operated jointly by the members of the federal broadcasting network ARD. Located at Wilhelmstrasse in the Mitte area close to the centre of Germany's federal government, it is used by ARD members and outlets for broadcasts from the capital. Some programmes, for example the weekly political TV show Bericht aus Berlin, the daily TV show ARD-Morgenmagazin, the political talk show Phoenix-Runde, are broadcast from the studio.

The studios were opened on 16 April 1999, when the federal government moved from Bonn to Berlin. Before World War II at this location was the physicist institut, which was named after Hermann von Helmholtz. Physicists like James Franck, Gustav Hertz, Walther Nernst, Max Planck and Wilhelm Wien worked here.

== Directors of ARD-Hauptstadtstudio ==
- 1999–2002: Ulrich Deppendorf
- 2002–2007: Thomas Roth
- 2007–2015: Ulrich Deppendorf
- 2015–2024: Tina Hassel
- since 2024: Markus Preiß
