= Saarländischer Rundfunk =

German public radio and television broadcaster

Coordinates: 49°13′23″N 7°01′57″E

- Type: Public broadcasting
- Industry: Mass media
- Predecessor: Reichssender Saarbrücken (1935–45); Radio Saarbrücken (1946–47); Saarländischer Rundfunk (1947–52); Saarländischer Rundfunk GmbH (1952–56)
- Founded: 1 January 1957
- Headquarters: Saarbrücken (Halberg), Germany
- Area served: Saarland
- Key people: Martin Grasmück (Director)
- Products: Broadcasting, radio
- Services: Television, radio, online.
- Website: sr.de

Saarländischer Rundfunk (pronounced [ˈzaːɐ̯ˌlɛndɪʃɐ ˈʁʊntfʊŋk]; "Saarland Broadcasting"), shortened to SR (pronounced [ɛsˈʔɛʁ]), is a public radio and television broadcaster serving the German state of Saarland. With headquarters in the Halberg Broadcasting House in Saarbrücken, SR is a member of the ARD consortium of German public-broadcasting organizations.

== History ==
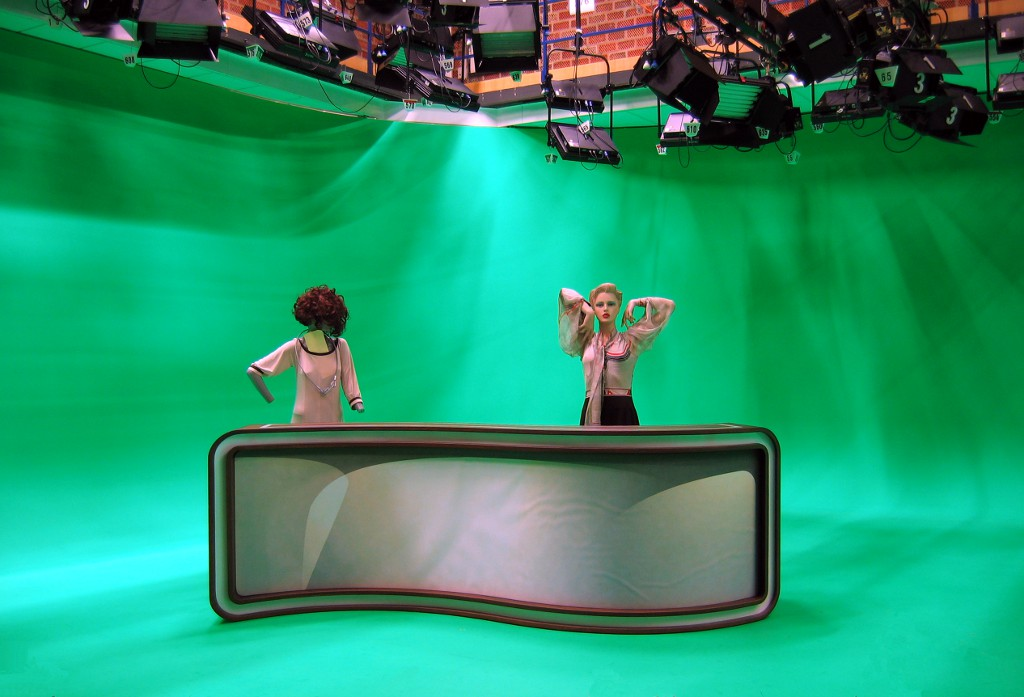
Virtual television studio with green-screen technique, inside SR's studio in Saarbrücken.

The history of Saarland Radio is closely linked to the history of Saarland, as an independent island between Germany and France.

Broadcasting in the Saarland began in 1929, under the League of Nations mandate. In 1935, when the Saar rejoined Germany, Joseph Goebbels's Propagandaministerium established the Reichssender Saarbrücken, under the control of the Reichs-Rundfunk GmbH Berlin. The interval signal of Reichssenders Saarbrücken were the first four notes of so called Steigerlied ("Glück auf, Glück auf").

After World War II, the Saarland was placed under French administration as the Saar Protectorate. The French military government established Radio Saarbrücken to serve the area. This became Saarländischer Rundfunk following the re-establishment of civilian government on 31 December 1947.

In 1952, the Saarland introduced a law reorganizing radio broadcasting, and created Saarländischer Rundfunk GmbH, a limited company. In 1953, SR expanded into television and started a second radio network, SR2.

The Saarland became part of the Federal Republic of Germany in 1957 and Saarländischer Rundfunk was converted into a public broadcasting corporation, patterned on the system in other Länder, and renamed Saarländischer Rundfunk. The organization joined the ARD alliance of broadcasting corporations in 1959.

On 5 April 1969, the three broadcasters then covering southwest Germany – Saarländischer Rundfunk, Südwestfunk (SWF; Southwest Broadcasting), and Süddeutscher Rundfunk (SDR, South German Broadcasting) – initiated a joint third television channel, known as Südwest 3 or S3. The new channel operated on only three days a week at first, then expanded to four days in September 1969, and to the whole week in 1971. On 30 August 1998, S3 became SR Südwest Fernsehen, planned in co-operation with Südwestrundfunk, the successor to SWF and SDR. Since 11 September 2006 it has been called simply SR Fernsehen. 70% of its programming is identical to that of the new SWR Fernsehen, but the on-screen logo and other graphic-design features are different. A teletext service, Saartext, has operated since 2 October 1989.

On 1 November 1964, the SR reorganized its radio services, converting SR1 – previously a general network – into the music station SR1 Europawelle Saar. A new station, SR3, was launched, aimed at immigrant workers in the region. Since 7 January 1980, SR3 has been known as SR3 Saarlandwelle and is the main regional station for the Saar.

SR2 became SR2 Studiowelle Saar in 1967. From 1972 until 1990, this station was organized in co-operation with SDR and SWF, and from 1990 until 1994 in co-operation with Hessischer Rundfunk's hr2 station. From 1 January 1995, the station has been known as SR2 KulturRadio and is now programmed independently.

SR4, the fourth radio service, began on 6 November 1989. The station carried programming for immigrant workers and, from 1 March 1999, coverage of debates in the Bundestag and Bundesrat (the two houses of the German parliament). When parliament was not sitting, SR4 carried SR2 and SR3 programmes.

On 1 March 1999, the SR began a youth station, UnserDing, produced in co-operation with the SWR's youth service DASDING. In January 2004, SR4 was closed and its frequencies were taken over by UnserDing.

In the ongoing discussion about the future of small ARD members like Radio Bremen and Saarländischer Rundfunk, SR Chairman Martin Grasmück said in 2021, he believes in "linear radio" but also the SR wants online-only content in the future.

== Organization and finances ==
=== Chairmen of the Saarländischer Rundfunk ===
- 1935–1938: Adolf Raskin, Director of Reichssenders Saarbrücken (Imperial Broadcasting Saarbrücken)
- 1938–1945: Karl Mages, Director of Reichssenders Saarbrücken, and later director of Radio Saarbrücken and first director of SR.
- 1945–1947: Emanuel Charrin, Officier-Chef du Center Emetteur, later Contrôleur Général of Radio Saarbrücken
- 1947–1948: Gérard Losson, General Director of Saarländischer Rundfunk
- 1948–1955: Frédéric Billmann, new General Director of Saarländischer Rundfunk (under French postwar administration)
- 1953–1954: Hans Wettmann, second General Director of Saarländischer Rundfunk
- 1954–1955: Hermann Mathias Görgen, new second General Director of Saarländischer Rundfunk
- 1955–1958: Eugen Meyer, provisional managing director of "Saarländischer Rundfunk GmbH"
- 1958–1978: Franz Mai, Director of the public broadcaster Saarländischer Rundfunk (under West German administration, after Saarland was reunited with West Germany)
- 1978–1989: Hubert Rohde
- 1989–1996: Manfred Buchwald
- 1996–2011: Fritz Raff
- 2011-2021: Thomas Kleist
- since 2021: Martin Grasmück

=== Finances ===
Every household in Germany is by law required to pay a monthly 18,36 Euro "Rundfunkbeitrag" (broadcast contribution fee) to finance the public broadcast system. The fee is collected by Beitragsservice von ARD, ZDF und Deutschlandradio.

== Programming ==
SR provides programmes to various TV and radio networks, some done in collaboration with other broadcasters, and others completely independently.

=== TV channels ===
- SR Fernsehen – Third TV channel for the Saarland, part of a regional collaboration with Südwestrundfunk.
- Das Erste – SR contributes programming to Germany's main network.
- Phoenix – collaborative network programming between the ARD and ZDF.
- KiKa – Children's network from the ARD and ZDF.
- Arte – Franco-German cultural network
- 3sat – Cultural network from the ARD, ZDF, ORF (Austrian Broadcasting), and SRG SSR (Swiss Broadcasting).

=== Radio stations ===
- SR 1 – Pop music and information
- SR kultur – ("Culture radio") High culture, classical music, drama, opera
- SR 3 Saarlandwelle ("Saarland Wave") – Music in German and French language (mostly chanson and schlager), also news from Saarland.
- UnserDing ("Our Thing") – Youth-oriented programming, in cooperation with DASDING from Südwestrundfunk.
- Antenne Saar – Spoken word information with Franco-German character.

== Digital Broadcasting and Transmitters ==
Beside FM transmitters SR is using DAB since December 30, 2000. Since 2012 SR is operating its own DAB Network in Block 9A. In 2016 the network was transferd to the recent standard DAB+.

- Heusweiler radio transmitter (broadcasts Deutschlandfunk's programming)
- VHF and TV transmitters on the Göttelborner Höhe, in the Moselle River valley, and in the Blies valley.

== See also ==
- Europe 1
- German television

== Literature ==
- Hans Bünte, et al.: Geschichte und Geschichten des Senders an der Saar – 50 Jahre Saarländischer Rundfunk. Herder Verlag 2007 ISBN 978-3-451-29818-9
