= Heusweiler radio transmitter =

Former medium wave transmitter in Heusweiler, Germany

Coordinates: 49°20′42″N 6°54′54″E

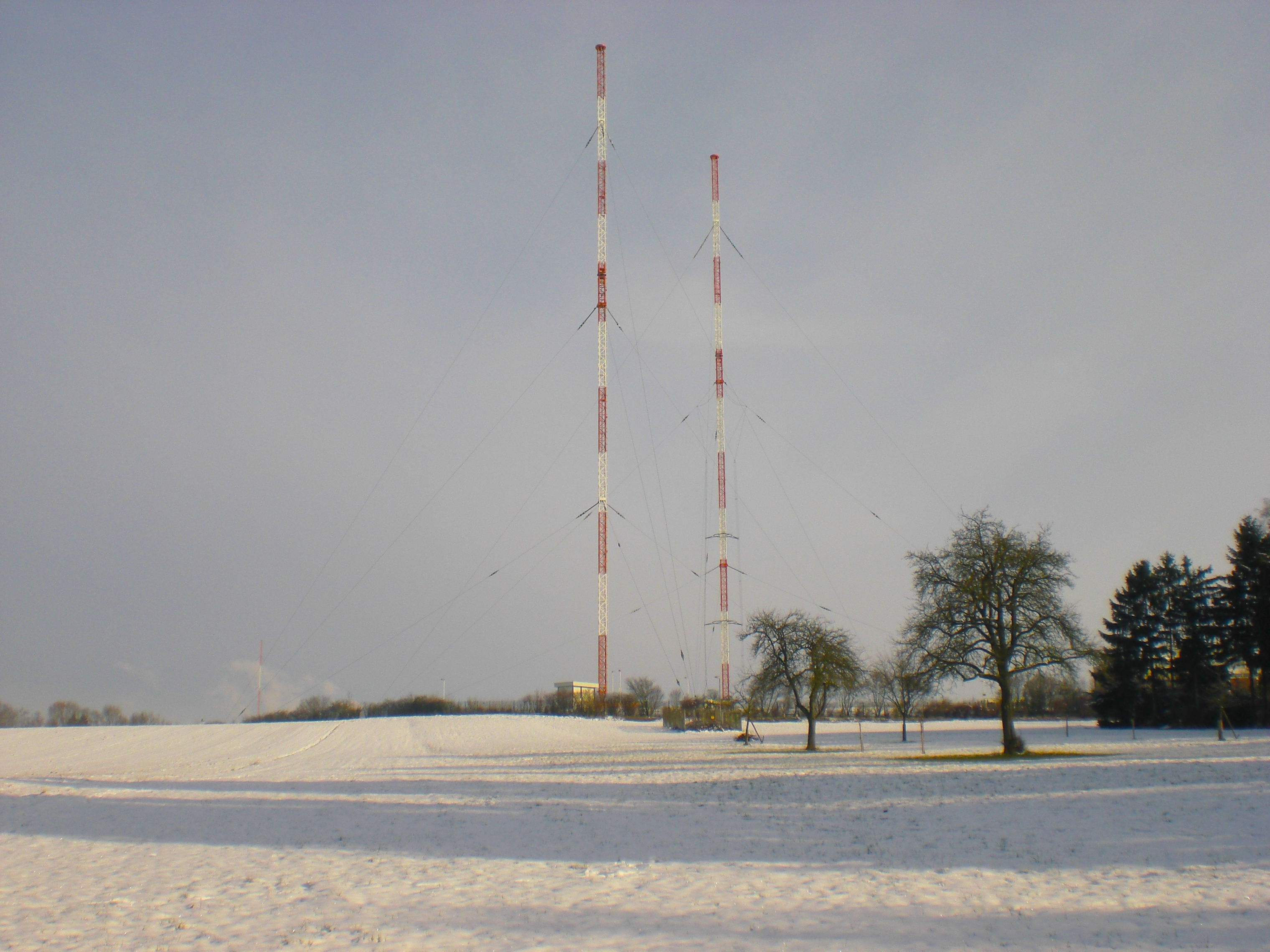
Transmitter Heusweiler

The Heusweiler transmitter was a facility for medium wave broadcasting north of Heusweiler, Germany. It originally went into service on 23 December 1935. On 19 June 1946 transmitter Heusweiler went in service again.

It was used by Saarländischen Rundfunk and with 1200 kW the most powerful medium wave transmitter in the ARD syndicat. The transmitters were defunct in 2015.

== History ==
=== Original transmitter ===
It used a t-aerial, which was up-hung on two 35 and 31 meters tall wooden towers. The Heusweiler transmitter was destroyed on March 17, 1945 by war damage.

First a T-aerial was used, which was, in the same year, replaced by a 50-metre-tall (160 ft) steel framework mast insulated against ground, which exists still today and serves as reserve antenna.

=== Replacement transmitters ===
In 1948, a 120-meter-high (390 ft) steel framework mast insulated from ground was built in Heusweiler. In the following years, the transmitting power of the Heusweiler transmitter was steadily increased.

In 1965, another radio mast with a height of 120 meters was built, and in 1973 the transmitting power was increased to 1200 kilowatts, with the power reduced to 600 kilowatts at night. The Heusweiler transmitter was thereby the most powerful medium wave transmitter in Germany, and the most powerful transmitter of the ARD.

From 1973 to 1994 the Heusweiler transmitter transmitted the program of Europawelle Saar.

Since 1994, the transmitter has been used for broadcasting the program of Deutschlandfunk. The transmitting power was permanently 600 kilowatts, however Deutschlandfunk closed down all its Medium Wave transmitters, including the Heusweiler radio transmitter on December 31, 2015.

In order to prevent a disturbing influence on car electronics by the transmitter, a net of wires was hung over the A8 Autobahn near the transmitter.

=== De-funct 2015 ===
On December 31, 2015 at 11:57 p.m. the channels were finally switched off. Since 11:45 p.m., the Deutschlandfunk frequency 1422 kHz had been broadcasting the old Deutschlandfunk marker, which has not been used in the program for years, in a continuous loop as a special farewell campaign.

The 1179 kHz frequency of Antenne Saar was switched off in the middle of the ARD night program.

After the end of the medium wave era in Germany, the facility in Heusweiler was shut down by Saarländischer Rundfunk. A planned sale to RTL in Luxembourg did not take place. In 2018 the masts were blown up in a controlled manner.
