= Bernd Höcker =

German journalist and author

Bernd Höcker (born 3 February 1953) is a German journalist and author from Hamburg. He is known for his campaigning against the GEZ (German public broadcasting).

== Publications ==
=== Literature ===
- Bernd Höcker: GEZ abschaffen!: Einblicke in die Dunkelwelt des öffentlich-rechtlichen Rundfunks, Höcker Verlag Oktober 2006
- Bernd Höcker: Blockwart TV – Wie sehr uns der öffentlich-rechtliche Rundfunk schadet, 2009
- Bernd Höcker: Böse Gutmenschen – Wer uns heute mit schönen Worten in den Abgrund führt, Kopp Verlag 2015
- Bernd Höcker: Erfolgreich gegen den Rundfunkbeitrag 2013"
- Bernd Höcker: Vegetarier Handbuch, Höcker Verlag
- Bernd Höcker: Bernds Kampfbüchlein: Erste Hilfe bei schweren Konflikten: strategisch, juristisch, psychologisch. Dieses Buch klärt auf über juristisches Vorgehen und über Maßnahmen im Schatten des Rechts.
