= ORF-Beitrags Service =

The ORF-Beitrags Service GmbH (short OBS; until the end of 2023 GIS Gebühren Info Service GmbH, short GIS; before that Gebühreninkasso Service GmbH) has been responsible for the collection and settlement of the Broadcasting Fee called "ORF-Beitrag" since January 1, 2024 in Austria, as the legal successor to the former GIS (Gebühren Info Service GmbH).

The OBS has been implementing the Broadcasting Fee Act (Rundfunkgebührengesetz) in fulfilling its mandate, it is tasked by law to perform core governmental tasks within the regulatory framework of the ORF Contribution Act and is consequently fully subject to state supervision and directives during the execution of these duties. As a so-called "entrusted company", it is subject to the instructions of the Federal Minister of Finance.

Similar companies comparable to the OBS would be, for example, the German ARD ZDF Deutschlandradio Beitragsservice, the Swiss Serafe AG, or the British TV Licensing.

== History ==
Originally, the company was a wholly-owned subsidiary of Post und Telekom Austria. The new Broadcasting Fee Act of 1999 (short RGG) allowed the Austrian Broadcasting Corporation (ORF) to acquire a 50% stake in the GIS. Since the beginning of 2001, the OBS, formerly GIS, has been a wholly-owned subsidiary of the ORF.

Since the original company name, Gebühreninkasso Service GmbH, emphasized that the GIS was a debt collection agency, the name was changed in May 2000 to the name that existed until the end of 2023, which was intended to suggest a service company that informs rather than controls. Furthermore, the GIS, now OBS, simultaneously holds official powers and can issue administrative notices ("Bescheide") in the first instance.

On January 1, 2024, the previous Broadcasting Fee ("Rundfunkgebühr") was replaced by the ORF Contribution Fee ("ORF-Beitrag"), which is now due per main residence as well as for some companies and (unlike the previous Broadcasting Fee) irrespective of the receiving device. The former GIS Gebühren Info Service GmbH was, by law, renamed to ORF-Beitrags Service GmbH and has since taken on the task of collecting the ORF Contribution Fee as the OBS. The well-known yellow GIS logo was replaced by the new red-white-red OBS logo.

== Business purpose ==
- Registration of those liable for the contribution based on registration data (main residence addresses);
- Billing and forwarding of collected funds to the federal states and ORF;
- Where necessary, initiating administrative procedures in case of non-payment of fees;
- Decision on possible exemption from the obligation to pay the ORF Contribution Fee and related levies; subsidization of telephone charges ("Zuschussleistung zum Fernsprechentgelt"), as well as EAG (Erneuerbaren-Ausbau-Gesetzes - Renewable Energy Expansion Act) cost exemption or EAG cost capping (since 2012);
- Information and consultation on all topics related to the ORF Contribution Fee.

== Company data ==
The Managing Director is Bettina Parschalk. The Supervisory Board members are Eva Schindlauer (chairperson), Harald Kräuter (deputy chairperson), Martina Skorepa, Petra Höfer, Hannes Prudlo (WC) and Doris Vogelsinger (WC).

The company currently employs a total of around 350 staff members at the locations Vienna, Linz and Graz.

== Legal foundations ==
- Federal Act on the Levying of an ORF Contribution 2024 ("ORF-Beitrags-Gesetz 2024"), - BGBl|I Nr. 112/2023 at the Federal Legal Information System "RIS".
