= SR Fernsehen =

German television station

- Country: Germany
- Broadcast area: Saarland
- Network: ARD
- Headquarters: Saarbrücken, Saarland

Programming
- Language: German
- Picture format: 576i (16:9 SDTV); 720p (HDTV)

Ownership
- Owner: Saarländischer Rundfunk (SR)

History
- Launched: 1 September 1998; 28 years ago

Links
- Website: www.sr.de/fernsehen

Availability

Streaming media
- SR Livestream: Watch Live

SR Fernsehen is a regional public service television channel owned and operated by Saarländischer Rundfunk (SR) and serving Saarland. It is one of the seven regional "third programmes" that are offered within the federal ARD network.

The channel, which is organized in cooperation with SWR Fernsehen of the neighboring Südwestrundfunk (SWR), started on 1 September 1998.

== Logos ==
2003 – 2006

2006 – 2023

17 February 2016 – 2023

2023 – present
