= Heusweiler =

- Municipality
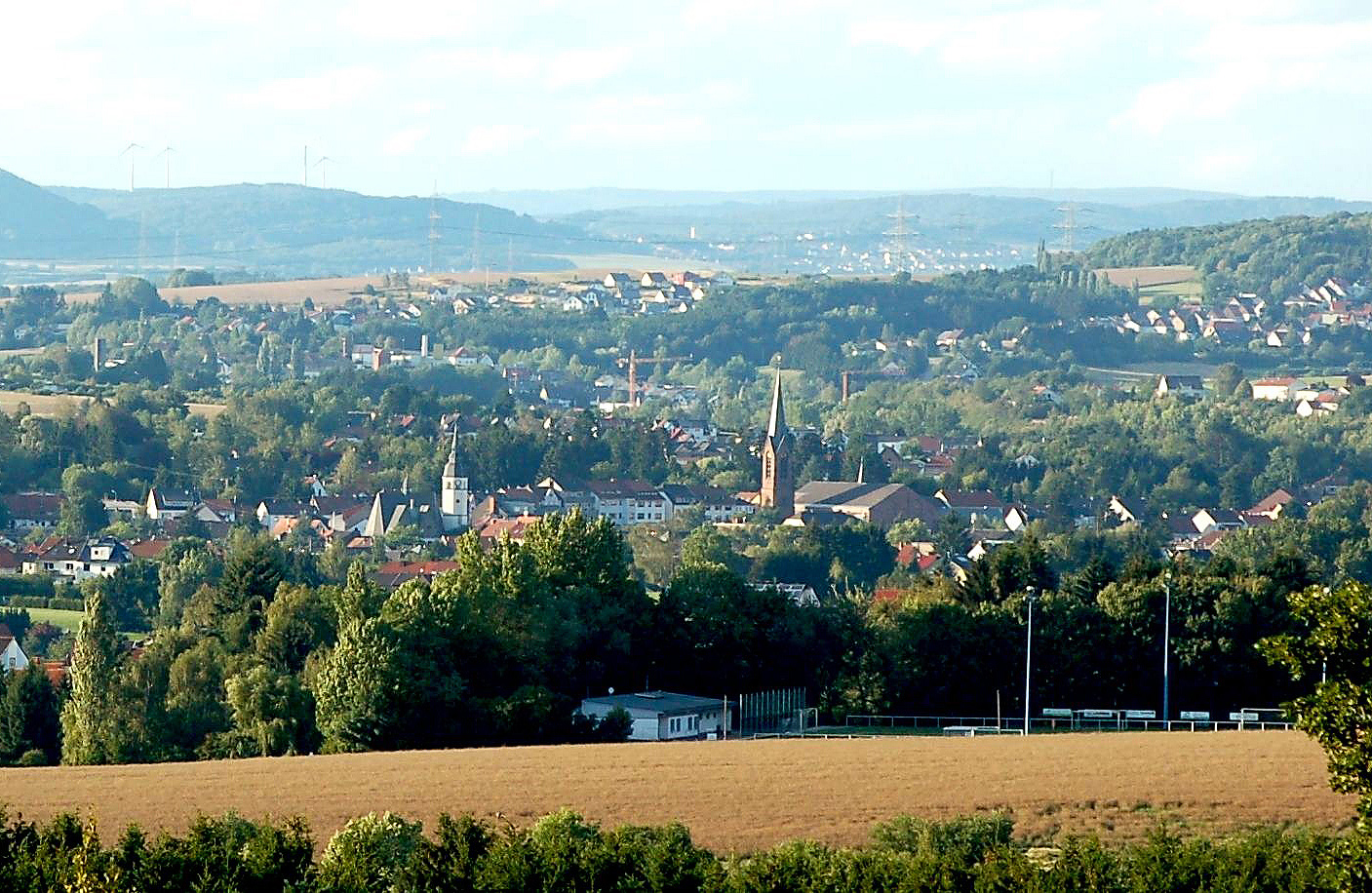
- General view of the town

- Flag Coat of arms

- Location of Heusweiler within Saarbrücken district
- Interactive map of Heusweiler
- Location within Germany Location within Saarland
- Coordinates: 49°21′N 6°55′E
- Country: Germany
- State: Saarland
- District: Saarbrücken
- Subdivisions: 7

Government
  - Mayor (2019–29): Thomas Redelberger (CDU)

Area
  - Total: 39.94 km^{2} (15.42 sq mi)
- Elevation: 240 m (790 ft)

Population (2025-12-31)
  - Total: 18,385
  - Density: 460.3/km^{2} (1,192/sq mi)
- Time zone: UTC+01:00 (CET)
  - Summer (DST): UTC+02:00 (CEST)
- Postal codes: 66265
- Dialling codes: 06806
- Vehicle registration: SB
- Website: www.heusweiler.de

Heusweiler (German pronunciation: [ˈhɔʏsvaɪlɐ]; Palatine German: Heiswiller [ˈhaɪ̯svɪla]; older French: Hoysviller) is a municipality in the District of Saarbrücken, Saarland, Germany. It is located in the upper Köllerbach valley, 15 km north of Saarbrücken. As of 2025, it has 18,385 inhabitants.

The municipality of Heusweiler consists of 16 villages: Berschweiler, Dilsburg, Eiweiler, Hellenhausen, Heusweiler, Hirtel, Holz, Kirschhof, Kurhof, Lummerschied, Niedersalbach, Numborn, Obersalbach, Rittershof, and Wahlschied, as well as the hamlet of Bietschied. With approximately 3,600 inhabitants each, Heusweiler and Holz are the largest villages in the municipality.

Heusweiler was the location of a high power medium wave transmitter, the transmitter Heusweiler. The transmitter ceased operation in 2015, and its two 120-metre masts mast were demolished in a controlled operation on September 21, 2018.
