= Ulrich Deppendorf =

German journalist (born 1950)

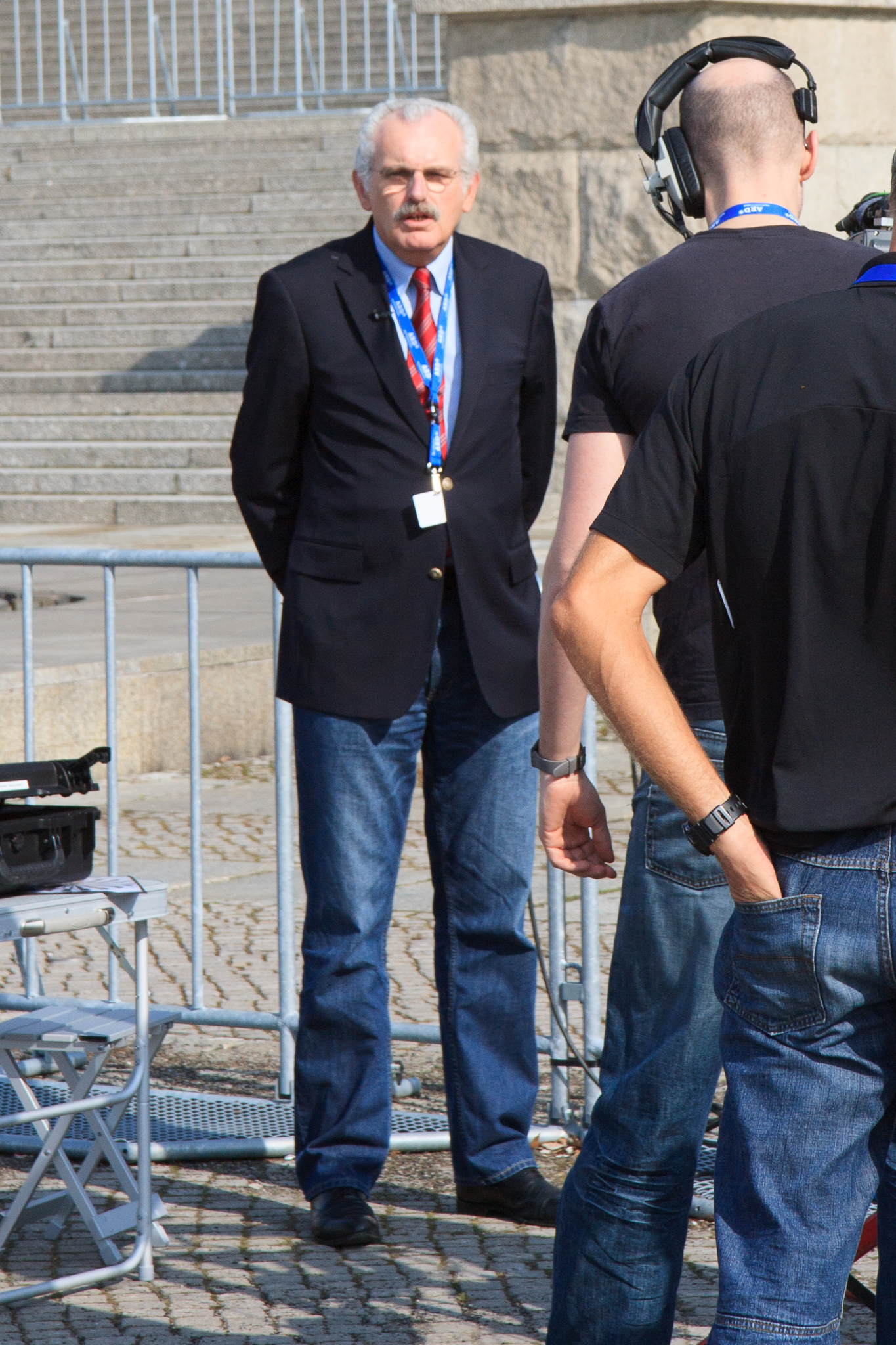
- Deppendorf during a tv recording in front of the Reichstag in Berlin, 2012
- Born: 27 January 1950 (age 76); Essen, West Germany
- Occupations: Journalist, Television presenter

Ulrich Deppendorf (born 27 January 1950) is a German journalist and television presenter.

== Life ==
Deppendorf was the host of the German news show Bericht aus Berlin on German broadcaster ARD.

== External golf links ==
- Ulrich Deppendorf at IMDb
- television host website by ARD
- podcast archiv „Deppendorfs Woche“
- „Der Bassist“, article about Ulrich Deppendorf, Georg Löwisch, 19 November 2011, die tageszeitung
