= ARD ZDF Deutschlandradio Beitragsservice =

German organization on television and radio fees

- Industry: Collecting society
- Predecessor: Gebühreneinzugszentrale (GEZ)
- Founded: 1976 (as GEZ)
- Headquarters: Cologne, North Rhine-Westphalia, Germany
- Area served: Germany
- Key people: Michael Krüßel (CEO)
- Revenue: 8,719,922,074 euro (2025)
- Owners: ARD, ZDF, Deutschlandradio
- Number of employees: 883 (2025)
- Website: www.rundfunkbeitrag.de/welcome/english

The ARD ZDF Deutschlandradio Beitragsservice (English: ARD ZDF Deutschlandradio contribution service), commonly referred to simply as GEZ, is the organization responsible for collecting the television and radio fee (Rundfunkbeitrag) from private individuals, companies and institutions in Germany.

The Beitragsservice is headquartered in Cologne and is an unincorporated joint organisation of Germany's public broadcasting institutions ARD, ZDF and Deutschlandradio, as well as their public-law affiliates. Mandatory licence fees are set in the Rundfunkfinanzierungsstaatsvertrag (English: State Treaty on the Financing of Broadcasting). Since 2013, every private household in Germany has been required to pay these fees, regardless of whether the household actually has the capability to receive the broadcasts themselves. Exceptions can be made for individuals with low income or health issues. Until 2013, the organisation was officially known as GEZ, short for Gebühreneinzugszentrale der öffentlich-rechtlichen Rundfunkanstalten in der Bundesrepublik Deutschland (English: Fee Collection Center of the Public Broadcasting Companies in the Federal Republic of Germany) and it is still commonly known by this name. The organisation collaborates with German civil registration offices to enforce the collection of the fees.

== Organization ==
The former logo, used until 2010

The Beitragsservice is an association of administrations subject to public law and has no legal capacity. It operates as a joint data center of the ARD state broadcasting institutions, the ZDF and Deutschlandradio, and administers the collection of licence fees. It was created by an administrative agreement.

The Beitragsservice is therefore not a legal entity of its own, but a part of the public broadcasting institutions. However, the Beitragsservice is a public authority in the material sense according to the Administrative Procedures Act of the Federal Republic of Germany (VwVfG), because it conducts public administration tasks. It conducts these tasks on behalf of the state broadcasting institutions.

== Tasks ==
Since January 1, 1976, the Beitragsservice (known as GEZ until 2013) has collected Rundfunkgebühren (broadcast licence fees) as set in the Rundfunkfinanzierungsstaatsvertrag. This had previously been the responsibility of Deutsche Bundespost, the West German federal post office. The GEZ's tasks in detail were:

- Collection of licence fees (obtaining licence fees in arrears, handling of payments)
- Remission of licence fees
- Planning of licence fees
- Customer care

On December 31, 1976, 18.5 million TV sets and 20.4 million radios were registered in the Federal Republic of Germany.

== Planning of licence fees ==
The Beitragsservice has overall control over the planning of licence fee revenues from the supply of public-legal broadcasting in the Federal Republic of Germany. Based on preliminary work by the Beitragsservice, licence fees are planned for a period of five years in advance or the current fee period by the Arbeitsgruppe Gebührenplanung (license fee planning work group), which is a subgroup of the Finanzkommission der Rundfunkanstalten (Financial Commission of Broadcasting Institutions). The managing director of the Beitragsservice is the chairperson of the Arbeitsgruppe Gebührenplanung.

== Charging of licence fees ==
The licence fee for radio, TV and new media amounted to €18.36 per month since August 2021.

On June 9, 2010, state governors decided that Heidelberg University Professor Paul Kirchhof's model of a flat-rate household licence fee would be introduced in 2013. The model set out the collection of licence fees as a lump sum per household, regardless of the number of broadcast reception devices present, or even, if any devices are present at all. This required that the 'GEZ' be reorganised, and that broadcast licence fee commissioners are no longer be employed by state broadcasting institutions. The monthly fee per household became the amount previously payable for television reception. Fee payers who previously only registered a radio or a "novel broadcast reception device" but no TV set, saw their licence fee increase by 212% (from €5.76 to €17.98), however households which previously had to pay multiple licence fees started to pay less.

Since 1 January 2013, the exemption for people with disabilities was replaced by a one-third fee. Under the previous regulations, the deaf and hard-of-hearing viewers who were legally deaf had been exempt. However, they started to contribute in 2013 in spite of relatively few hours of TV programming with closed-captioning. Sign Dialog, the working group of German Association of the Deaf, has nominated that they are more willing to pay the full rate once the milestone of 100% closed-captioning programming has been reached.

In August 2021, the fee was raised from €17.50 per month to €18.36 per month.

== License fee revenues and administrative costs ==
In 2010, the GEZ collected €7.65 billion in licence fees for state broadcasting institutions. Collection costs amounted to €160.5 million, which is about 2.13% of total revenue or €3.83 per participant. Additional costs are generated in the state broadcasting institutions by the so-called Beauftragtendienste (commissioner services), those expenditures for licence fee collection amounted to €184.97 million in 2007, according to the ARD 2008 yearbook.

According to its 2010 annual report, the GEZ employed 1,148 people. According to its website, the Beitragsservice as of now employs around 900 people.

In 2016, the total sum of licence fees collected amounted to €7,978,041,425.77, with administrative expenses for the Beitragsservice itself totaling €167,954,892.36.

In 2024, the total revenues from the broadcast contribution amounted to €8,739,564,843.55. Administrative expenses for the Beitragsservice were €190,699,227.69, which represents 2.18% of the total revenue. By the end of the year, the service employed 897 people, and approximately 3.73 million contribution accounts were in a dunning stage or under enforcement (Vollstreckung).

== Elicitation and storage of data ==
The state broadcaster and the Beitragsservice can store and administer fee payer data needed to collect the fee. The Federal Statistical Office of Germany counts 39 million private households, while the GEZ in 2004 held 41.2 million data sets of fee payers. These included 2.2 million data sets of fee payers who de-registered ownership of devices which can receive radio/television. GEZ had one of the most comprehensive databases on the population of the Federal Republic of Germany.

Another source of data are resident registration offices, which forward new registrations and changes of registration to the Beitragsservice. In 2002, German registration authorities transferred over 12 million data sets to the GEZ.

To identify non-payers, the GEZ expanded its database with data purchased from commercial address vendors. This is allowed under the terms of the Rundfunkstaatsvertrag.

== Resistance ==
Some regional courts have ruled that enforcement is illegal (Zwangsvollstreckung, forced seizure of property, for example directly from bank account registered with the tax office or from pay) to recover the amount due contribution (which is not tax), on the grounds that the Beitragsservice is a private organisation and not part of the state.

People have been jailed for not paying the fee. One was later released after the charges were dropped due to criticism from both public and private media.
