= Bummi =

Bummi may refer to:

- Bummi (magazine), an East German children's magazine
- "Bummi-Lied" (German: Bummi Song), a German children's song
- a bear character in the East German children's puppet series with the kobold Pittiplatsch
- nickname of Ralf Bursy (1956–2022), German singer and music producer

== See also ==
- Bummy (disambiguation)
