= Heinz Schröder =

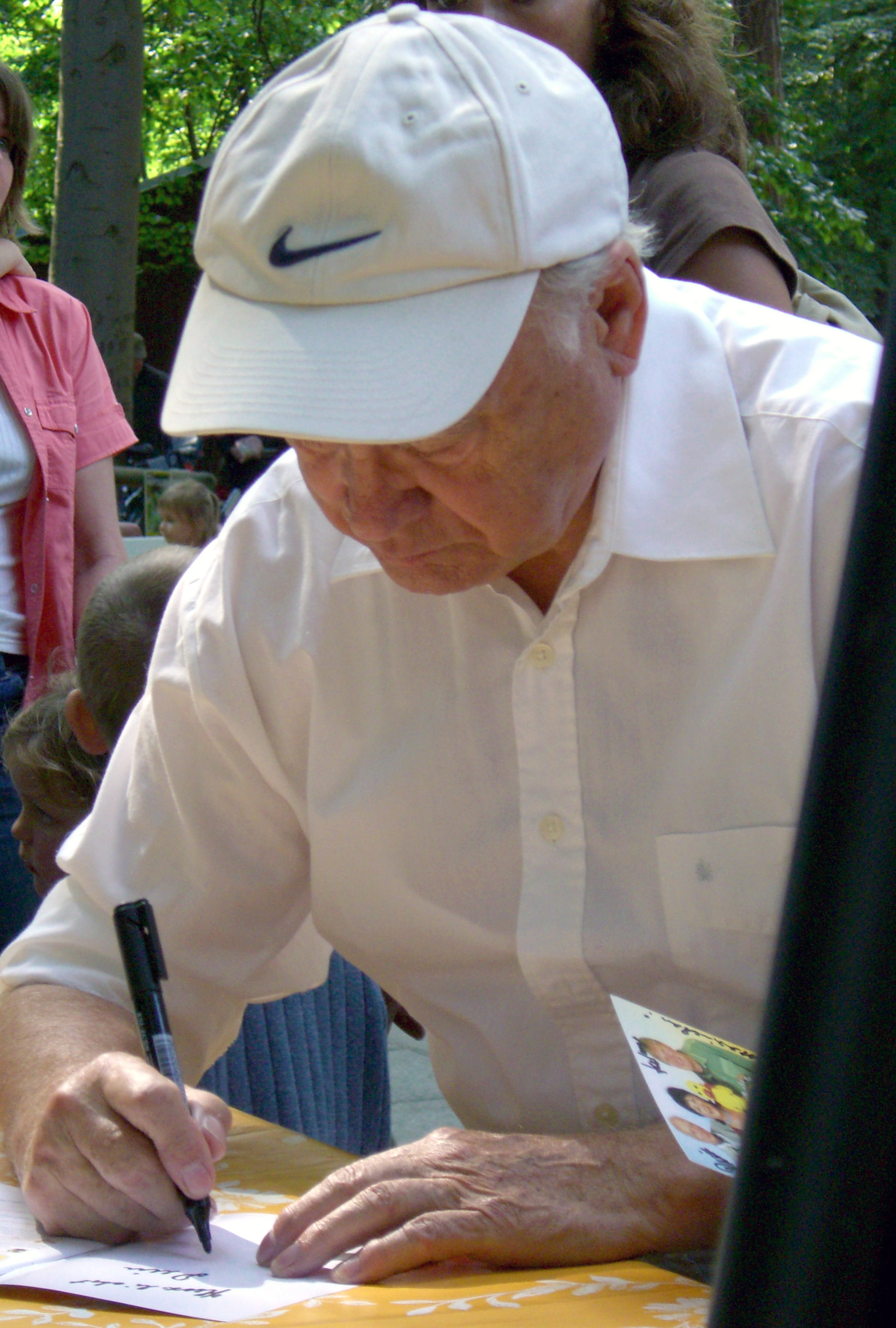
- Heinz Schröder in 2007
- Born: April 24, 1928; Berlin, Germany
- Died: April 22, 2009 (aged 80); Rüdersdorf, Germany
- Occupation: puppeteer

Heinz Schröder (April 24, 1928 – April 22, 2009) was a German puppeteer. He became known in East Germany (German Democratic Republic) for puppeteering popular characters such as Pittiplatsch and Herr Fuchs (Mr. Fox) in the children's program of the East German television. From 1993 to 2009, Schröder continued to portray his characters in live performances.

== Life and career ==
Heinz Schröder was born in Berlin and grew up in the borough Friedrichshain. Early in his life, he became interested in puppets and made figures out of potatoes. After Schröder broke from an apprenticeship as a design draughtsman, he got by taking odd jobs. After 1945 he worked in the magistrate of East Berlin and later in the district committee of the Free German Youth. From 1953, he performed in the newly founded puppet theater of the Berlin Pioneer Park "Ernst Thälmann" and from 1957 he finally started puppeteering on East German television, which should continue for over 30 years until 1991.

The most famous character Schröder portrayed and still puppeteered and voiced after his television career is Pittiplatsch, who first appeared in 1962. He was also one of Pittiplatsch's creators since he originally came up with the idea for a kobold character and also reworked the first Pittiplatsch model before the first appearance on television.

In 1991, the production of new television episodes with characters Heinz Schröder portrayed had been discontinued. However, from 1993 to 2009 he had been performing live with a puppeteer ensemble puppeteering characters originating from East German children's television.

Schröder stated that making children's eyes shine with his performances is his life. He also said that the good thing about his time at the East German television was that he and the other puppeteers were not constrained politically, commenting that one couldn't put a pioneer scarf on a fox.

Heinz Schröder was married and lived in Schöneiche near Berlin. The last time he performed was on March 29, 2009. He died unexpectedly on April 22, 2009. One day before his death, a spinal tumor was detected. Schröder was buried in Schöneiche in the presence of his immediate family circle.

== Roles ==
Schröder mostly portrayed puppet characters appearing within the Zu Besuch im Märchenland ("Visiting Fairy Land") and Sandmännchen ("Little Sandman") series. Characters he puppeteered and mostly also voiced include:

- Pittiplatsch
- Herr Fuchs (Mr. Fox)
- Frau Igel (Mrs. Hedgehog)
- Brummel the bear
- Bummi the bear
- Onkel Uhu (Uncle Eagle Owl)
- Buddelflink the mole
- Casimir in Das Spielhaus ("The Playhouse"), puppeteering only

During his live performances, he still portrayed Pittiplatsch, Herr Fuchs, Frau Igel, Onkel Uhu, and Buddelflink.
