= Uns're Heimat =

Uns're Heimat may refer to:

- The concept of Heimat
- Unsere Heimat, a communist song about nature
- Uns're Heimat, Uns're Liebe, a football chant
- "Ons Heemecht", the national anthem of Luxembourg
