= Feustel =

Feustel is a surname. Notable people with the name include:

- Andrew J. Feustel (born 1965), American geophysicist and a NASA astronaut
- Ingeborg Feustel (1926–1998), German writer
- Louis Feustel (1884–1970), American horse trainer

== See also ==
- Robert M. Feustel House, historic home located at Fort Wayne, Indiana (US)
