= Moppi =

Moppi may refer to:

- a Microsoft Office Professional Plus installer for the Command-line interface
- a character from the German children's TV series Sandmännchen
