= Pittiplatsch =

East German fictional character

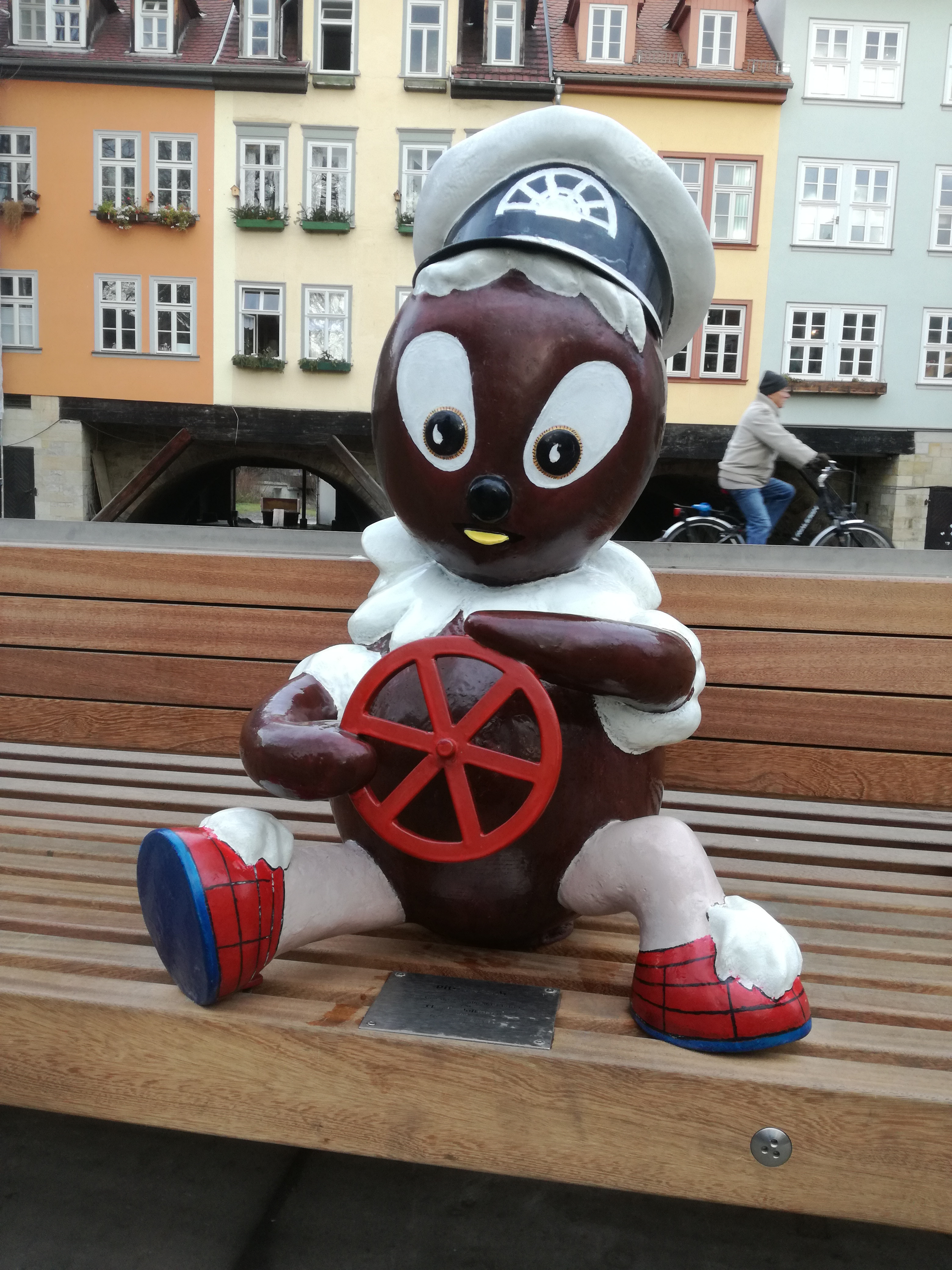
Pittiplatsch statue in Erfurt, Germany

Pittiplatsch, also known as Pitti for short, is a German fictional kobold character who was very famous in East Germany (German Democratic Republic), especially as a puppet character on children's television. He first appeared in 1962 in the television series Meister Nadelöhr erzählt ("Narrations from Master Needle Eye"), later renamed Zu Besuch im Märchenland ("Visiting Fairyland"). The character was co-created by the writers Ingeborg Feustel and Günther Feustel, the sculptor Emma-Maria Lange, and the puppeteer Heinz Schröder. The Pittiplatsch hand puppet was puppeteered and voiced by Heinz Schröder until his unexpected death in April 2009. Norbert Schwarz succeed Schröder as Pittiplatsch's puppeteer in 2009. In May 2010, it was reported that Christian Sengewald took over the role.

Today, the short puppet colour films created for East German television are still broadcast on the Sandmännchen ("Little Sandman") children's TV program, but there are no new productions for TV. However, new merchandise is still produced. Since 1993, the puppeteer ensemble also has been performing live. The death of Pittiplatsch's puppeteer Heinz Schröder in April 2009 put the show on hold until August. On November 26, 2019, new episodes started airing on MDR, KiKA, and rbb.

== Concept and creation ==
On November 23, 1955, the first episode of the long-running television series Meister Nadelöhr erzählt was broadcast, starring Eckart Friedrichson as the master tailor Meister Nadelöhr, who lived in his tailor parlour in fairyland and told stories to the viewers. In the beginning, he was accompanied by two live-action canaries Zwirnchen and Röllchen ("Little Thread and Little Bobbin"), who were replaced with puppet characters. In February 1958, the eponymous bear mascot of the children's magazine Bummi was added to the series. Another puppet joined in 1958, Schnatterinchen the duck. Both characters were portrayed as very dutiful and honest.

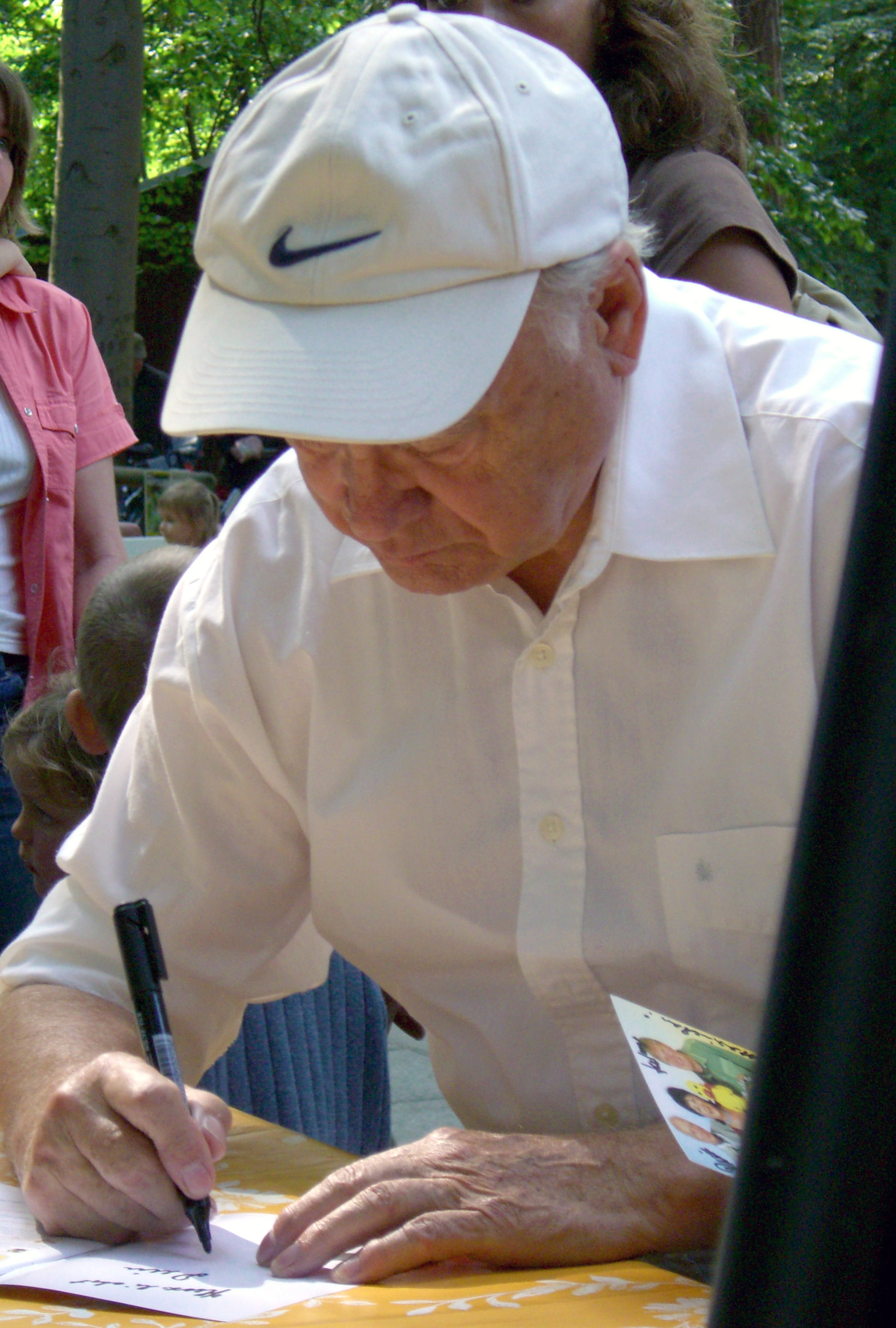
Heinz Schröder puppeteered and voiced Pittiplatsch for more than four decades

However, the makers felt that these characters could become boring in the long run. The puppeteer Heinz Schröder had the idea of a character based on the kobold, a sprite of German folklore, to serve as comic relief. Schröder imagined a naughty little boy who didn't age, had magic abilities and didn't need to be parented. In cooperation with the writers Ingeborg and Günther Feustel, the designer and sculptor Emma-Maria Lange created a first model. The work resulted in a black-skinned boy with full hair and long legs wearing patent leather shoes. This design was rejected by Schröder who thought it was too cute. As a result, most of the hair was removed, the legs were crooked and the leather shoes were replaced with felt ones.

Pittiplatsch, as the kobold was named, also needed an appropriate voice. Schröder and the other puppeteers spent one whole night trying all possible pitches of voice they could think of without success. At the last minute, Schröder almost gave up and shouted "I can no longer" (Ich kann nicht mehr) with a squeaky voice. His colleagues and the director Erich Hammer agreed that this squeaky voice was just right for Pittiplatsch.

In 1962, Pittiplatsch debuted on television as a new companion of Meister Nadelöhr, puppeteered and voiced by Schröder. Unlike Bummi and Schnatterinchen, he was introduced as a more naughty and cheeky character. In his first appearance, Pittiplatsch took Schnatterinchen's toys and stole some pudding. Some parents and teachers were concerned that children would only learn bad behaviour from Pittiplatsch. This caused Pitti to be removed from the show after a few broadcasts. However, thanks to a lot of support from children who protested against this decision by mailing to the East German television, Pitti was brought back. Since then, he became a recurring character on the show Meister Nadelöhr erzählt, which was later renamed Zu Besuch im Märchenland, and also appeared in other East German shows and media. A lot of the Pittiplatsch-related stories in numerous media were written by Ingeborg and Günther Feustel, who created many other works for the country's children's media as well.

== Appearances ==
Pittiplatsch was a recurring character on the show Zu Besuch im Märchenland, originally Meister Nadelöhr erzählt. Following the retirement of Eckart Friedrichson, who died in 1976, Meister Nadelöhr was replaced by the character of Fabian in September 1978, played by Klaus-Peter Pleßow.

The kobold was present almost one thousand times in the Abendgruß ("evening greeting") of the daily children's show Sandmännchen, the first time on June 17, 1962. These stories were only a few minutes long. In the early 1970s, Pittiplatsch and the duck Schnatterinchen started to appear solely in the short stories. The makers searched for a third character, which had to be a dog. At first, they reused the puppet Struppi known from the older defunct show Flax und Krümel. He was later replaced by the newly created dog character Moppi, who debuted on April 3, 1976, and starred alongside Pitti and Schnatterinchen in more than 400 Abendgruß episodes. As with Meister Nadelöhr, Pittiplatsch and his friends also still starred alongside their human companion Fabian in some Abendgruß episodes. Many of the short colour films are still shown on TV, but not the black and white films.

There were also longer Pittiplatsch films produced, one of which is Pittiplatsch reist ins Koboldland ("Pittiplatsch travels into Koboldland"), where Pitti experienced adventures with his siblings in Koboldland.

Several books and audiobooks starring Pittiplatsch were released in East Germany, often being written by Ingeborg Feustel. Many of them have been re-released in reunited Germany, new Pittiplatsch-related works have been published as well. Series of Pittiplatsch comics under the titles Pittiplatschs neueste Abenteuer ("Pittiplatsch's newest adventures") and Pittiplatschs Abenteuer ("Pittiplatsch's adventures") were printed in the listings magazine FF-Dabei in the 1970s and 1980s.

After the East German television stopped broadcasting in 1991, there were no new productions for television. Since 1993, there have been live performances featuring the original puppet characters, nearly only in the formerly East German states of Germany. The show, commonly known under the names Zu Besuch im Märchenland and Pittiplatsch und seine Freunde ("Pittiplatsch and his friends"), is run by Show-Express-Könnern. The puppeteers Heinz Schröder and Bärbel Möllendorf performed live along with the musician Henry Kaufmann, whose role was taken over by Helmut Frommhold in 2005. Schröder's death on April 22, 2009, put the show on hold. In August 2009, it continued under the name Wenn der Zirkus kommt ("When the circus comes"), with a new focus on circus elements. Pittiplatsch was absent, and other classic puppet characters were added instead, including Moppi. In November of the same year, Pittiplatsch returned. The show's name was changed to Pittiplatsch auf Reisen (roughly "Pittiplatsch is travelling"). The first performance with Pittiplatsch after Schröder's death took place on November 7. Pittiplatsch was then puppeteered and voiced by Norbert Schwarz. The ensemble stated that they chose him for the role since his voice was "very similar" to the original voice of Pitti. In May 2010, it was reported that Pittiplatsch's puppeteer had changed again. Christian Sengewald took over the role after he replied to a want ad. The reasons for Schwarz's leaving were not revealed. On November 26, 2019, new episodes started airing on MDR, KiKA & rbb. the newer episodes were filmed in Cologne by NDR.

== Reception and impact ==
Pittiplatsch and his trademark voice provided by Heinz Schröder are widely known in former East Germany by both young and old. The little kobold is regarded as Schröder's most well-known character and achieved cult status in that region.

Many different Pittiplatsch articles were made in East Germany, such as dolls, stuffed toys, hand puppets, board games and sweets. In reunited Germany, various new Pittiplatsch merchandising is still on sale.

In 1964, Pittiplatsch was printed on a postage stamp on the occasion of Children's Day, among several other stamps depicting characters from East German children's television.

A techno song titled Ach du meine Nase ("Oh you my nose", from Pitti's trademark phrase) was released in 1994, as part of the project Sandmann's Dummies. The song used many phrases from Pittiplatsch (spelled "Pitty Platsch") and Schnatterinchen (spelled "Schnatte Rienchen") and remixed them in a comical way, causing the characters to say sexual innuendos. Another song in a similar fashion based on Herr Fuchs und Frau Elster, also from East German television, was made as well. The two singles were commercially successful, selling around 270,000 copies combined in 1994.

The Berlin-based ice hockey team Eisbären Berlin uses Pittiplatsch's phrase Ach du meine Nase as part of their song when scoring a goal during home games.
