= Das Spielhaus =

- Country of origin: East Germany
- No. of episodes: 91

Original release
- Network: DDR-F2 / DFF 2
- Release: 1982 – 1991

Das Spielhaus (The Playhouse) was a popular puppet theatre television series that played on the second channel of Deutscher Fernsehfunk in the former East Germany.

== Plot ==
The eight residents of a mobile home with twelve wheels experienced fantastic adventures together. The character Knollo often created inventions that ended in explosions, while Schlapper was more sceptical and timid. Together with the vain Defifé and the brilliant Masine, the series featured other colourful characters.

== Characters ==
- Masine (caring girl with red hair)
- Kleiner (cheeky boy with a snub nose)
- Laribum (somewhat chubby artist)
- Kniffo (cosmonaut)
- Knollo (inventor)
- Defifé (vain and moody girl with long red hair)
- Casimir (clever cat)
- Schlapperplapper (a sheep)

== Cast ==
Cast	Voice-over artist	Puppet artist
Casimir	Gert Kießlin	Heinz Schröder
Schlapper	Ingeborg Naß (Dieter Peust)	
Defifé	Hildegard Alex	Kornelia Eulert, Hella Müller; Karl Huck
Masine	Helga Sasse	Friedegard Kurze
Kleiner	Evamaria Bath	Ingeburg Fülfe
Kniffo	Gunter Sonneson	Violetta Czok; Florian Krüger
Knollo	Walter Wickenhauser	Bernd Broszeit
Laribum	Ernst-Georg Schwill	Barbara Augustin; Barbara Gorn
Fridolin		
Jonathan	Helmut Müller-Lankow ?, Angelika Lietzke ?	

== Crew ==
- Redaction: Rita Hatzius, Bärbel Möllendorf, Gerdamarie Preuße
- Dramaturgy: Bärbel Möllendorf, Rita Hatzius, Helga Krecek
- Manager: Antje Geiger
- Production Manager: Eckhard Grosch, Doris Kocks, Christina Eggert
- Assistant director: Camilla Meyer
- Director: Kurt Schumacher, Wolfgang Genth
- Lyrics: Andreas Turowski
- Music: Helmut Frommhold, Volkmar Schmidt
