= Ingeborg Feustel =

German writer (1926–1998)

Ingeborg Feustel (born Ingeborg Baumann: 1 January 1926 - 23 November 1998) was a German writer of books for children. She also wrote scripts for children's radio and television dramas. Until 1989 the small town where she lived and worked was in the German Democratic Republic (East Germany); but even before reunification her work was well known on both sides of the Inner German border.

== Life ==
Ingeborg Baumann was born in Berlin. At school she was, by her own account, a rebellious child. From 1945 she was employed as a teacher in Blankenfelde-Mahlow, a small town just outside Berlin on the city's south side. She trained and worked under the "Neulehrer" scheme introduced in the aftermath of the Second World War by the military administrative bodies controlling the western two thirds of Germany between 1945 and 1949. She married Günther Feustel who also became a school teacher after the war. The Soviet occupation zone in which they lived together was relaunched as the German Democratic Republic (East Germany) in October 1949. Slightly more than ten years later, following the example set a few years earlier by her husband, she embarked on her career as a freelance author of children's books.

Her children's books are not forgotten. "Antonio und Großvater Autobus" ("Antonio and Grandfather Antrobus") appeared in 1965, bringing millions - not just the younger readers - a little closer to distant Italy. She also wrote many children's songs. She was a member of the Aus dem Butzemannhaus team with East German children's radio. She created Pittiplatsch and the dog Moppi as well as Plumps, fictional characters featuring in television fairy tales in the series "Zu Besuch im Märchenland" and in the evening "Sandmännchen" animations, which were among the most successful and enduring productions from East German television.

== Works ==
=== Children's books ===
- Antonio und Großvater Autobus (1965)
- Bibi (1967)
- with Ingeborg Meyer-Rey: Die lustigen Streiche des Pitti-Platsch. Ein musikalisches Bilderbuch. Lied der Zeit, Berlin 1967
- Krachbumtus (1968)
- Ein Wald und Schweinchen Jo (1968)
- Tuppi Schleife und die drei Grobiane (1970)
- Tina, Knulle und Tamtam (1970)
- Borstels Waldlesebuch (1970)
- Der Märchensputnik (1972)
- Guten Morgen, Kastanienbaum (1973)
- Robbi und die Bumsstiefel (1974)
- Leopold (1978)
- Tessi und die Eule Susu (1979)
- Julchen (1980) 8 Geschichten über ein Schweinchen
- Leopold im Weidenhaus (1980)
- Leopold und Winni (1983)
- Bastian und die Pinguine (1988)
- Leopold und Winni im Schnee (1989)
- Leopold und Winni am Meer (1990)
- Leopold, der neugierige Hund (1991) - 2. Auflage von Leopold (1978)
- Leopold und Winni. Wie Leopold die Katzensprache studierte (1995) (reading and painting book)

=== Children's audio drama ===
- Der Koboldsturm und andere Geschichten mit Pittiplatsch, Schnatterinchen und Moppi (1980)
- Das Flattergespenst in der Gartenlaube
- Als Pitti schneller wachsen wollte
