= Gerhard Behrendt =

Gerhard Behrendt

Gerhardt Behrendt (3 April 1929, Potsdam – 26 September 2006, Berlin) was a German director, Puppet designer, and author of the Sandmännchen character for the Deutscher Fernsehfunk Berlin.

== Life and work ==
Behrendt started his career in 1943 as a painter apprentice at the Preußisches Staatstheater Berlin in the area of scenic painting. He continued his studies after the end of World War II (1945) at the Deutsche Staatsoper Berlin. During this time he also worked as an actor and comedian. In 1946 he started work in his chosen field, but also published caricatures. He went to Potsdam in 1948, and was certified as set designer by the State of Brandenburg one year later. Behrendt started his work as puppet designer and animation specialist at the DEFA in 1953 and began to work for the Deutscher Fernsehfunk in 1956. There, he became director for satirical animated movies, and in 1958 founded the Puppenstudio, a studio for puppets.

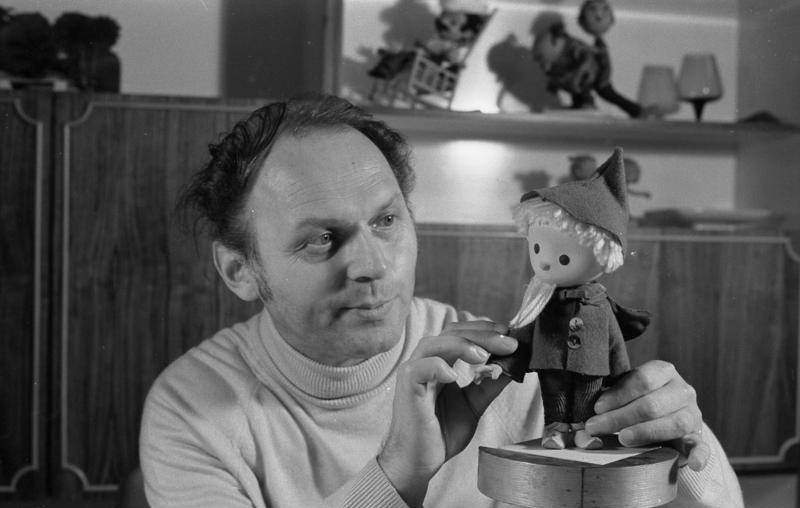
Behrendt in 1979 with one of his Sandmännchen

Within 14 days he developed the character of the Sandmännchen in 1959, which is famously known in Europe ever since. He was at the same time author, director, set designer, and animator for the Sandmännchen productions. Over time he added new characters to these shows: Professor Köpfchen, Paul und Stine, the Urvieh, and the Messemännchen (Mascot and symbol for the Leipzig Trade Fair).

In 1977 the Polish newspaper Kurier Polski awarded him the Prize of smiles on the suggestion of Polish children.

He worked in "his" studio until the German reunification, when the East German Television was disbanded, and he retired. He continued some work as an independent director and creator of puppets.

He was awarded the Bundesverdienstkreuz on 4 April 2005, which was given to him by the mayor of Berlin, Klaus Wowereit. He is one of the few persons who were honored with the Bundesversdienstkreuz and the East German Nationalpreis der DDR award.

Behrendt died on 26 September 2006 after a long illness.
