= Bummy =

Bummy may refer to:

== Nickname ==
- Walter C. Booth (1874–1944), head coach of the Nebraska college football program
- Henry Bumstead (1915–2006), American film art director and production designer, two-time Oscar winner
- Al Davis (boxer) (1920–1945), American boxer
- Calvin Symonds (born 1932), Bermudian retired cricketer and footballer

== Fictional characters ==
- Bummy Pfitzer, on the British sitcom On the Buses (1969–1973)
- Bummy, on the 1973–1974 TV show Lotsa Luck, an American remake of On the Buses
- Bummy, one of the mascots of the Seoul International Cartoon and Animation Festival

== See also ==
- Tropical Fantasy, a soft drink sometimes called "Bummies"
- Bummi (disambiguation)
