= Ingeborg Meyer-Rey =

German illustrator (1920–2001)

Ingeborg Meyer-Rey (also Ingeborg Meyer-Tschesno: 14 December 1920 – 4 April 2001) was a German illustrator. She was one of the best known illustrators of children's books in the German Democratic Republic.

== Life ==
Ingeborg Meyer-Rey was born in Berlin. When she was 20 she embarked on a study of illustration and wall-art at the Berlin University of the Arts in Berlin-Charlottenburg. In 1946 she obtained a job as a press artist for the Tägliche Rundschau, a hitherto defunct newspaper title that had been revived by the military administration which since May 1945 had been in control of a large central portion of Germany, including the eastern half of Berlin itself. One year later she took a job in the arts department, working as an illustrator, at the Soviet Arts Palace ("Haus der Kultur der UdSSR"), where she stayed till 1950. It was in 1950 that her son, Grischa Meyer, was born: his father, Grigorij Weiss, was a Soviet cultural administrator. It was during this period that she designed the early issues of the monthly Roman-Zeitung, a magazine designed to popularise Soviet literature. She also produced her first published illustrations for children's books, which marked a decisive step in her career. Meanwhile, the political situation in what had been the Soviet occupation zone moved forwards in October 1949 when the entire zone was relaunched as the Soviet sponsored German Democratic Republic. In the early 1950s Meyer-Rey began working as a freelance illustrator, with connections to various publishing houses, of which probably the most significant was "Kinderbuchverlag Berlin". In 1957 she created "Bummi" the teddy bear, the main character in the eponymous monthly, later biweekly magazine for pre-school children. Bummi was at the heart of a long-running professional association with Ursula Werner-Böhnke who edited the magazine. As well as the book and magazine illustrations, Bummi also appeared on a silk stage curtain that she made for the Berlin Puppet Theatre.

Meyer-Rey was a member of the National Association of Visual Artists ("Verband Bildender Künstler der DDR"). Her illustrations applied a figurative-realistic approach, which was deeply influenced by Soviet artists of the time. An exceptionally prolific artist, she can be seen as one of the best known and most influential illustrator of children's books in the German Democratic Republic, where generations of children, especially during the early years of their school careers, used textbooks that incorporated her illustrations. Many of her books worked through a succession of editions and some are still (2017) in print. Her work also achieved success with publishers abroad, notably in Sweden, the Netherlands, Britain, France, Yugoslavia, Denmark, Finland, Norway, Hungary, the United States of America, Cuba, Czechoslovakia, China and even West Germany, where editions were also published in Sorbian. "Der gute Held. Märchen der Völker der Sowjetunion" ("The Good Hero: Fairy Tales from the Soviet People"), illustrated by Ingeborg Meyer-Rey, was celebrated (by election) as one of the German Democratic Republic's Most Beautiful Books in 1952.

== Publications (selection) ==
- with Elisabeth Schwarz: Das erste Schuljahr. Kinderbuchverlag, Berlin 1950
- Vom Peter, der sich nicht waschen wollte. Ein Bilderbuch. Kinderbuchverlag, Berlin 1951
- with Ludmilla Herzenstein: Das neugierige Entlein. Kinderbuchverlag, Berlin 1952
- Kleine Freunde. Kinderbuchverlag, Berlin 1952
- with Walter Krumbach: Unsere Hoftiere. Kinderbuchverlag, Berlin 1953
- with Walter Krumbach: Tierfreunde. Kinderbuchverlag, Berlin 1953
- with Ursula Peter: Unser Schiffchen fährt durch Deutschland. Kinderbuchverlag, Berlin 1953
- Drei Kinder und ein Rollmops. Kinderbuchverlag, Berlin 1953
- Die gestohlene Nase. Kinderbuchverlag, Berlin 1953
- with Erika Engel: Das Osternest. Kinderbuchverlag, Berlin 1955
- with Walter Krumbach: Beim Puppendoktor. Kinderbuchverlag, Berlin 1955
- with Dorothea Neckel: Ulrikchen, gute Nacht. Ein Bilderbuch. Kinderbuchverlag, Berlin 1955
- Es tanzt ein Bi-Ba-Butzemann. Kinderbuchverlag, Berlin 1955
- Hoppe, hoppe, Reiter. Kinderreime. Kinderbuchverlag, Berlin 1957
- Mauz und Minchen. Eine lustige Katzen-Bildergeschichte. Kinderbuchverlag, Berlin 1958
- with Edith Bergner: Vom Jochen, der nicht aufräumen wollte. Kinderbuchverlag, Berlin 1959
- with Edith Bergner: Der große gelbe Drachen Kinderbuchverlag, Berlin 1959
- with Edith Bergner: Der erste Schultag. Kinderbuchverlag, Berlin 1959
- with Fred Rodrian: Der Märchenschimmel. Kinderbuchverlag, Berlin 1960
- with Anne Geelhaar: Hans Fröhlich und das Vogelhaus. Kinderbuchverlag, Berlin 1961
- with Rudolf Schultz-Debowski, Hansgeorg Stengel: 1-2-3 - wir sind dabei. Kinderbuchverlag, Berlin 1962
- Komm mit mir, Hänschen. Kinderbuchverlag, Berlin 1963
- with Kurt Steiniger: Ringelreih der sieben Tage. Kinderbuchverlag, Berlin 1963
- with Werner Lindemann: Das Osternest. Kinderbuchverlag, Berlin 1964
- with Benno Pludra: Heiner und seine Hähnchen. Kinderbuchverlag, Berlin 1965
- with Rudolf Schultz-Debowski: Guckkasten für kleine Leute. Kinderbuchverlag, Berlin 1965
- with Inge Trisch, Walter Krumbach, Wolfgang Richter, Rudolf Schultz-Debowski: Kinderfest mit Meister Nadelöhr. Friedrich Hofmeister Musikverlag, Leipzig 1965
- with Witali Bianki: Die erste Jagd. Kinderbuchverlag, Berlin 1965
- Meine Tiere. Kinderbuchverlag, Berlin 1966
- with Ursula Sturm, Walter Krumbach, Wolfgang Richter, Rudolf Schultz-Debowski: Gleich kommt unser Sandmännchen. Lied der Zeit Musikverlag, Berlin 1966
- with Samuil Marschak: Das Tierhäuschen. Kinderbuchverlag, Berlin 1967
- with Rudolf Schultz-Debowski und Hansgeorg Stengel: Zirkus drunter und drüber. Kinderbuchverlag, Berlin 1967
- with Ingeborg Feustel: Die lustigen Streiche des Pitti-Platsch. Ein musikalisches Bilderbuch. Lied der Zeit, Berlin 1967
- with Elsbeth Friemert: Wer kennt meine Tiere. Kinderbuchverlag, Berlin 1968
- with Benno Pludra: Vom Bären der nicht schlafen konnte. Kinderbuchverlag, Berlin 1968
- with Hiltrud Lind: Das blaublumige Büffelkind. Kinderbuchverlag, Berlin 1968
- with Alfred Könner: Watschel. Altberliner Verlag Groszer, Berlin 1968
- with Walter Krumbach: Bunte Blätter. Kinderbuchverlag, Berlin 1968
- with Samuil Marschak, Johannes Bobrowski: Das Tierhäuschen. Kinderbuchverlag, Berlin 1968
- with Horst Irrgang: Ein Männlein steht im Walde. Deutscher Verlag für Musik, Leipzig 1970
- Mischka der Bär. Ein Märchen mit Bildern. Kinderbuchverlag, Berlin 1970
- with Friedrich Güll: Wundergarten. Gedichte. Kinderbuchverlag, Berlin 1972
- with Eva Strittmatter: Brüderchen Vierbein. Kinderbuchverlag, Berlin 1972
- Drei kleine Küken. Altberliner Verlag, Berlin 1973
- with Hiltrud Lind: Randi. Kinderbuchverlag, Berlin 1973.
- with Vladislav Stanovsky und Jan Vladislav Lommelchen. Ein tschechisches Märchen. Kinderbuchverlag, Berlin 1973
- Drei kleine Affen. Nach einem japanischen Volksmärchen. Altberliner Verlag Groszer, Berlin 1974
- with Wolfgang Buschmann und Rudolf Schultz-Debowski: Die Geschichte vom Nußknacker Kunka Kinderbuchverlag, Berlin 1974
- with Edith Bergner: Der Star im Apfelbaum. Kinderbuchverlag, Berlin 1974
- with Walentin Katajew: Schalmei und Krüglein. Kinderbuchverlag, Berlin 1975
- with Horst Irrgang und Ursula Werner-Böhnke: Bummi am Nordpol. Ein Bilderbuch mit Musik. Deutscher Verlag für Musik, Leipzig 1976
- Bienchen summ herum. Kinderbuchverlag, Berlin 1977
- with Barbara Augustin: Seepferdchenrennen. Kinderbuchverlag, Berlin 1978
- with Andreas Reimann: Kleine Tiere essen gern Kinderbuchverlag, Berlin 1978
- with Renate Krause: Das Sonnenblumenfest. Altberliner Verlag Groszer, Berlin 1978
- with Stepan Pissachow: Wie der Pope sich eine Magd nahm. Kinderbuchverlag, Berlin 1978
- with Anne Geelhaar: Köpfchen, mein Köpfchen. Kinderbuchverlag, Berlin 1979
- with Klaus Bourquain Vom Veilchen, das nicht duftete. Kinderbuchverlag, Berlin 1980
- with Alfred Könner: Drei kleine Hasen. Altberliner Verlag, Berlin 1983
- Der kleine Häwelmann. Ein Kindermärchen. von Theodor Storm: Kinderbuchverlag, Berlin 1984
- with Fred Rodrian: Wer stiehlt den Speck? Kinderbuchverlag, Berlin 1984
- with Wolfgang Buschmann: Guten Tag, Frau Igel. Kinderbuchverlag, Berlin 1984
- Ein Vogel wollte Hochzeit machen. Kinderbuchverlag, Berlin 1987
