= Ilse Obrig =

German television presenter, journalist, author and radio host (1908–1979)

Ilse Obrig (* born February 21, 1908 in Elberfeld; died October 3, 1978 in West Berlin) was a German broadcast-editor, presenter, and a children's book author. She is regarded as the mother of The Sandman (German: Sandmännchen), a famous German children's bedtime television program.

== Life ==
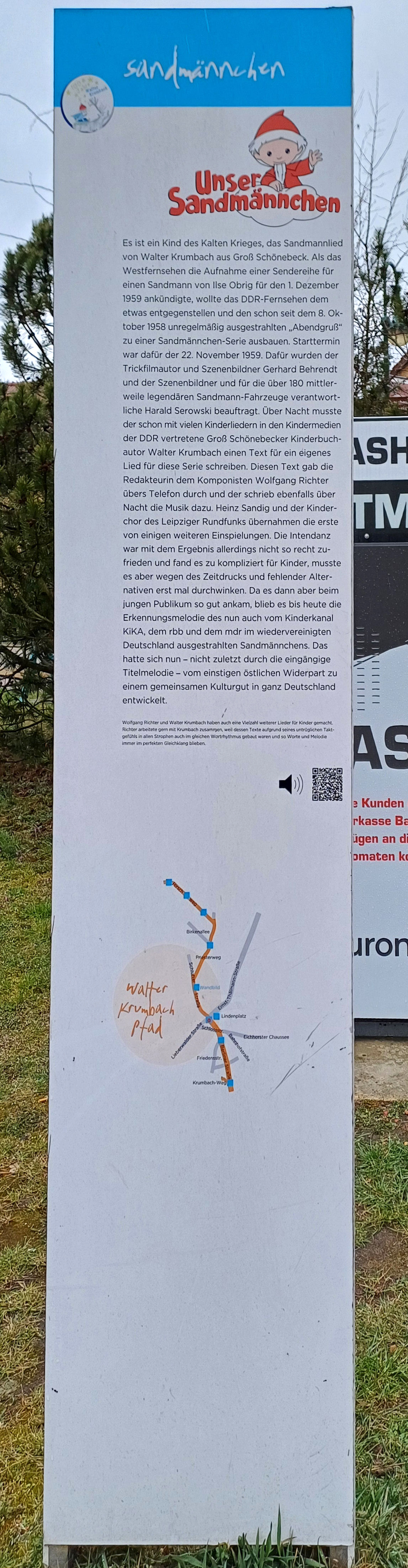
Commemorative plaque in Groß Schönebeck, a small town north of Berlin.

Obirg started working at the Children's radio department for the Central German Broadcasting Company (German: Der Mitteldeutschen Rundfunk AG (MIRAG)) headquarters based in Leipzig in 1928, while still pursuing her studies in Psychology at Leipzig University. Leipzig University accepted Obrig's Ph.D. dissertation, “Kinder erzählen angefangene Geschichten weiter” (English: Children continue unfinished stories) in 1934. Two years later in 1936, Obrig began working at the Reichsender Berlin, a radio station in Berlin. At the radio station, she was a writer and a presenter and worked on the popular children's radio series, Famille Fröhlich.

From 1945 to 1949, Obrig helped establish the Berlin public radio's children's radio programming department. In 1950, Obrig moved to the west side of Berlin and started working for the Radio in the American sector for Northwest German Broadcasting, which at the time was still responsible for public broadcasting in West-Berlin. After the founding of the Free Public Radio of Berlin (Berlin's state public broadcasting institution) in 1954, Obrig worked as their senior editor for children's radio and television there until her retirement in 1973.

In 1951, The First Channel, a flagship national television channel of ARD, was running tests and revising to be screen ready. Ilse Obrig sprung to action and developed Children's Hour (German: Kinderstunde) which was the first German television series for children. After regular television broadcasts began in late 1952, Obrig took turns with other hosts to present Children's Hour.

Children's Hour was a half hour broadcast which aired several times a week until the mid-1960s. Instead of Obrig speaking directly to the camera, the Children's Hour consisted of Obrig sitting in a circle with the children where she read stories, made things, and sang songs.

The Sandman, a famous German children's bedtime television character, was based on an idea Obrig had in early 1959. But before the Free Public Radio of Berlin (West German public broadcasting channel) put the West German Sandman on air in December 1959, the German Television Broadcasting (East German public broadcasting channel) had secretly learned of their plans and made their own version of the Sandman before. German Television Broadcasting were the first to broadcast an East German version of the Sandmann, Unser Sandmännchen (English: Our Little Sandman in November 1959.

Ilse Obrig also wrote nonfiction books and stories for children.

== Opinions ==
- The purpose of Children's Hour was to encourage children to engage in active leisure activities such as paper crafts, making figures like Mr. Potato Head, and constructing toys out of discarded nutshells. The children also focused on practicing Standard German skills, respect for elders, and simply drawing straight lines, all while remaining cheerful and modest. Unfortunately, since the children had never learned to be spontaneous, their reactions had to be practiced beforehand.
- Ilse Obrig was praised for her “spontaneity, liveliness, cheerfulness, and her intuitive way with children. Obrig accomplished all this while presenting with a focus on educating children in a light, playful manner". She was the life and soul of her programs, as she led activities, at the same time included films in her programs. Groups of children would easily gravitate to her during her broadcasts. Activities such as gymnastics, singing, dancing, arts-and-crafts, which were practiced beforehand, were part of the program's set list. These activities were intended to encourage the audience to imitate them, in the spirit of promoting developmental, artistic education. In between these activities, Obrig included rest breaks with puppet shows.
- "Ilse Obrig's Children's Hour radiated above all a sense of tranquility and calmness. Each episode started with Ilse Obrig sitting with children in a circle and just talking with them. She would then go on to read a picture book out loud. The images in the book were displayed for several minutes so that viewers could take time to really look at them (by comparison, the camera cuts to a different image after about two to three seconds in broadcasting programs today). In addition, the children listened to songs and watched sketches that had been previously rehearsed. In the 1950s, children's television programs were expected to not only be interactive and engaging, but also calming in order to counteract their “nervous restlessness””

== Merits ==
- 1973: Order of Merit of the Federal Republic of Germany

== Work ==
- Kinder erzählen angefangene Geschichten weiter. (English: Children continue unfinished stories.) Beck, Munich 1934 (As her dissertation at Leipzig University in 1934).
- Kinder, wir basteln! Das große Spiel- und Beschäftigungsbuch. (English: Kids, let's do some crafts! The Big Book of Games and Activities.) Franck, Stuttgart 1935, 12th Edition published in 1969.
- Kinder, wir spielen! Das große Spielbuch. (English: Kids, Let's Play! The Big Book of Games.) Franck, Stuttgart 1937, 3rd edition published in 1954.
- Wart, Kathrin, wir helfen dir! Erzählung aus dem Erzgebirge. (English: Wait, Kathrin, we'll help you! A story from the Ore Mountains.) Union, Stuttgart 1937.
- Guter Mucki, nimm mich auch mit! Eine Reise zu den Auslandsdeutschen in Rumänien. (English: Hey, Mucki, take me with you too! A journey to visit the Germans living in Romania.) Union, Stuttgart 1937.
- Dackel Lüttje und das Katzenkind. Lustige Tiergeschichte für Jungen und Mädel. (English: Lüttje the Dachshund and the Kitten: A Funny Animal Story for Boys and Girls.) Union, Stuttgart 1938, 3rd Edition published in 1956.
- Familie Fröhlichs Wunderbuch. Reime, Spiele, Rätsel und Lieder für Mutter und Kind. (English: The Fröhlich Family's Book of Wonders. Rhymes, Games, Puzzles, and Songs for Mother and Child.) Abel & Müller, Leipzig 1940.
- Kinder, wir wollen Theater spielen! Fröhliche Vorschläge. (English: Kids, let's put on a play! Fun ideas.) Franck, Stuttgart 1940.
- Sepp und Sabine. Eine frohe Geschichte für Mädel und Jungen. (English: Sepp and Sabine. A cheerful story for girls and boys.) Union, Stuttgart 1958.
- Bunt und froh ist unsere Welt. Kinderspiele, Rätsel, Märchen und Lieder aus ganz Europa. (English: Our world is colorful and joyful. Children's games, puzzles, fairy tales, and songs from all over Europe.) Franck, Stuttgart 1960.
- Fröhlich durch das ganze Jahr. (English: Happy all Year Round.) Union, Stuttgart 1960.
- Theater spielen macht Spaß. (English: Acting in plays is fun.) Kemper, Heidelberg 1960.
- Überall ist Kinderland. Kinderspiele aus aller Welt mit Alltag und Festen, Liedern und Geschichten. (English: Everywhere is Children's Land. Children's games from around the world, featuring everyday life celebrations, songs, and stories.) Franck, Stuttgart 1961.
- Kindergeburtstag. Einladungen, Vorbereitung, Ablauf. Mit vielen Spiel- und Beschäftigungsvorschlägen. (English: Children's Birthday Party. Invitations, Preparation, Schedule. With lots of ideas for games and activities.) Falken-Verlag Sicker, Wiesbaden 1972, ISBN 3-8068-0287-4, reprinted by Falken, Niedernhausen in 1994, ISBN 3-8068-0287-4.
- Wir freuen uns auf Weihnachten. Das große Spiel und Bastelbuch. (English: We're looking forward to Christmas. The Big Book of Games and Crafts.) Goldmann, Munich, 1976, ISBN 3-442-20166-7, 2nd edition published in 1977.
- Kinderspiele aus aller Welt. (English: Children's games from around the world.) Goldmann, Munich, 1977, ISBN 3-442-20192-6.
- Freude mit Kindern. Spiele, Lieder, Bastelarbeiten. (English: Fun with Kids: Games, Songs, and Crafts.) Goldmann, Munich, 1979, ISBN 3-442-10795-4.
- Wir feiern Kindergeburtstag. (English: We're celebrating a child's birthday.) Abridged and revised new edition by Falken, Niedernhausen in 1998, ISBN 3-635-60478-X.
