= Bummi (magazine) =

East German children's publication

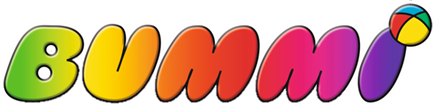
- First issue: 15 February 1957; 68 years ago
- Country: Germany (East Germany 1957–1990)
- Language: German

Bummi is the title of a German magazine for children in kindergarten age. The eponymous hero Bummi is an upright walking, yellow-furred teddy bear.

Bummi was first published on 15 February 1957 as a monthly in the GDR. From 1965 onwards, it was published biweekly and cost 0.25 Mark. It had a run of 736,300 copies in Verlag Junge Welt. The magazine was officially published and supported by the central organisation of the FDJ with the aimed at age group of children from 3 to 6 years. It was sold at kiosks and ordinary magazine stands. The eponymous title character was designed by Ingeborg Meyer-Rey. long-serving main contributing editor Ursula Werner-Böhnke wrote the lyrics to the Bummi-Lied, to which the melody was composed by Hans Naumilkat. The lied became part of the educational system from 1969 onwards.

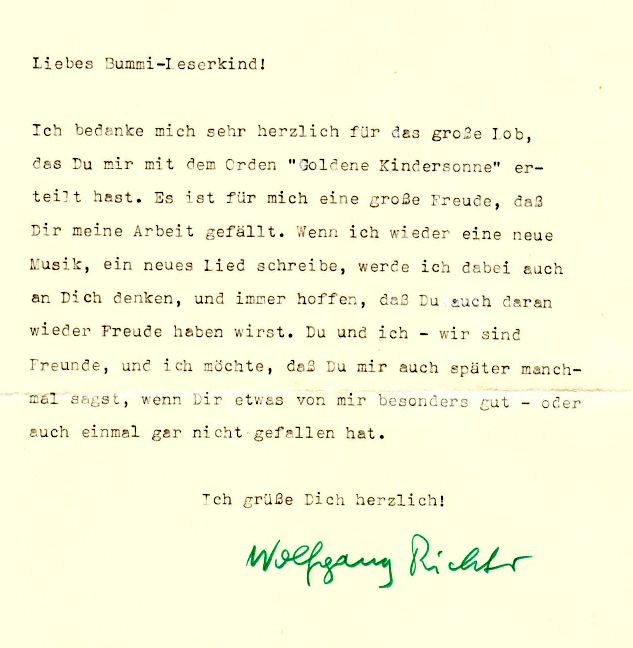
The children's composer Wolfgang Richter says thanks for a "Goldene Kindersonne".

At the beginning of the 1970s, the magazine introduced the "Goldene Kindersonne" (German for: "Golden Children's Sun"), which was an award the children could cut out of the magazine and give to a person of their choice (in reference to other awards in the grown-up world). Children contacting the magazine to confer a "Goldene Kindersonne" award could obtain a standardised, but hand-signed thank-you letter from one of the famous contributing artists and authors.

== About Bummi ==
Bummi lives together with his friends in one house in the town of Huxlipux. His friends are the female brown bear Binchen, the lion Eddie, the ape Yam Yam, the giraffe Malia, the elephant Tutu and Osterhasenoma.

At the end of the year 2018 the lion Eddie was replaced by the tomcat Pepe.
