= Bummi-Lied =

German children's song

The "Bummi-Lied" (German for: „Bummi-Song“) with its opening line „Kam ein kleiner Teddybär..“ („Came a little Teddy bear“..) is a Kinderlied from the GDR with 5 stanzas. The text was written by Ursula Werner-Böhnke, main contributing editor of the children's magazine Bummi. The melody was composed by Hans Naumilkat. The text is a reference to the main character of the eponymous children's magazine, the yellow teddybear „Bummi“. The magazine was created in 1957 for children in kindergarten age. From 1969 onwards, the tune was part of the educational system for primary school starters with a slightly to 3 stanzas shortened version. The written text was published by VEB Friedrich Hofmeister Musikverlag Leipzig.

== Literature ==
- Musik. Lehrbuch für Klasse 2, Berlin 1974, S. 19.
