= Hans Naumilkat =

German composer

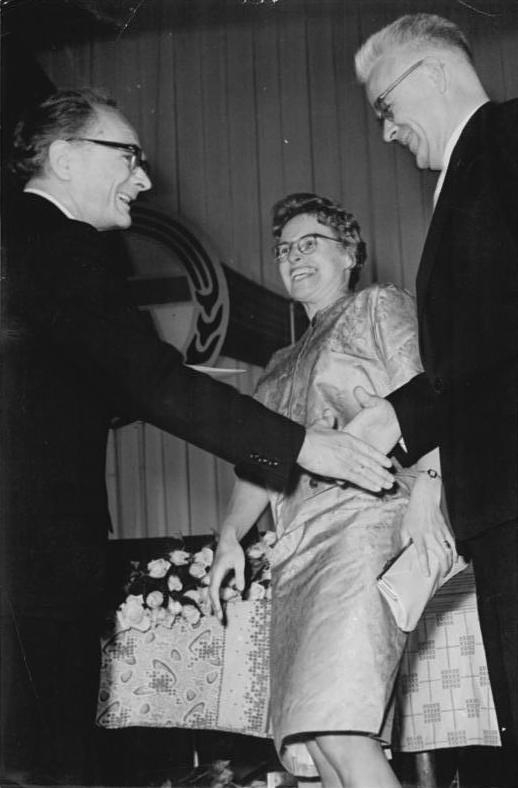
Hans (right) and Ilse Naumilkat receive the Preis für künstlerisches Volksschaffen 1961

Hans Christoph Karl Friedrich Naumilkat (9 December 1919 – 13 February 1994) was a German composer and music educator.

== Life ==
Born in Schönebeck, Naumilkat passed his Abitur in 1938 and subsequently studied music and music education in Braunschweig, Berlin and Halle.

After the Second World War, Naumilkat headed the folk music department, the music department of children's radio and the children's choirs of the Berliner Rundfunk, which were founded in 1950. He worked as a freelance composer and from 1957 as a music teacher.

In 1966, he was appointed as professor and from 1968 to 1974, he directed the "Ensemble Etkar André" at the Georg-Friedrich-Händel-Gymnasium in Berlin. From 1974, he was choirmaster and music teacher at the Pädagogische Hochschule Erfurt/Mühlhausen.

Naumilkat composed mainly vocal works for his choirs, for school practice and for the GDR pioneer organisation; the lyrics of many of his songs were written by his wife Ilse, who also worked as a choir director. Through inclusion in school books, radio broadcasts, television productions with the choirs he conducted and live performances up to the act of state, his songs achieved wide distribution.

Naumlkat died in Berlin at the age of 74.

== Compositions ==
- Cantatas
  - Die Brücke
  - Deutschland, du liebe Heimat
  - Vom Trümmerstein zum Bauprogramm, 1952
  - Wir wollen aufrecht gehen durch dieses Leben, 1958
  - Über unserer Heimat scheint die Sonne, 1959
  - Jeder neue Morgen bringt uns ein neues Glück, 1966
  - Junge Saat unterm Bohrturm, 1978
- Weihnachtslied
- Vorfreude, schönste Freude (text: Erika Engel-Wojahn)
- Kinder- und Pionierlieder
  - Fröhlich sein und singen
  - Unsere Heimat
  - Wir haben Ferien und gute Laune
  - Soldaten sind vorbeimarschiert
  - Das Fernsehturmlied
  - Bummi-Lied (Kam ein kleiner Teddybär)
