= Unsere Heimat =

East German youth movement song

"Unsere Heimat" (Our Homeland) was a popular song in the German Democratic Republic (East Germany), where it was sung by the Ernst Thälmann Pioneer Organisation. The lyrics were written by Herbert Keller and the melody by Hans Naumilkat. The song expresses strong bonds with nature, emphasizing the significance of a sense of homeland (Heimat) beyond people. "Unsere Heimat" was taught in school music classes and was typically sung by children’s choirs. In 1951, when the song was written, an attempt was being made to establish a new idea of homeland, distinct from fascism’s conception of it. Over time, the song developed into a kind of anthem that glorified the idea of a socialist homeland and thus the political ideology of the GDR.

The song plays an important role in the 2003 film Good Bye, Lenin!, being sung several times by Young Pioneer groups.

== Lyrics ==
Unsere Heimat, das sind nicht nur die Städte und Dörfer,
unsere Heimat sind auch all die Bäume im Wald.
Unsere Heimat ist das Gras auf der Wiese,
das Korn auf dem Feld und die Vögel in der Luft
und die Tiere der Erde
und die Fische im Fluß sind die Heimat.
Und wir lieben die Heimat, die schöne
und wir schützen sie,
weil sie dem Volke gehört,
weil sie unserem Volke gehört.

Translation:

Our Homeland is not only the cities and villages,
our Homeland is also all the trees in the forest.
Our Homeland is the grass in the meadow,
the grain in the field and the birds in the air
and the animals of the earth
and the fish in the river are the homeland.
And we love the beautiful homeland,
and we protect it,
because it belongs to the people,
because it belongs to our people.
