= Sandmännchen =

German children's television program

- VHS cover for the East German version of Sandmännchen
- Also known as: Unser Sandmännchen
- Genre: Fantasy; Supernatural
- Developed by: Gerhard Behrendt
- Countries of origin: East Germany (1959–1990); Germany (1990–present)
- Original language: German
- No. of seasons: 61+
- No. of episodes: 22,200+

Production
- Production companies: Deutscher Fernsehfunk (1959–1991); Mitteldeutscher Rundfunk (1992–present); Norddeutscher Rundfunk (1992–present); Ostdeutscher Rundfunk Brandenburg (1992–2003); Sender Freies Berlin (1992–2003); Rundfunk Berlin-Brandenburg (2003–present)

Original release
- Network: DFF (1959–1991); MDR (1992–present); NDR (1992–present); SFB (1992–2003); ORB (1992–2003); Kika (1997–present); RBB (2003–present)
- Release: 22 November 1959 – present

Related
- Das Sändmannchen

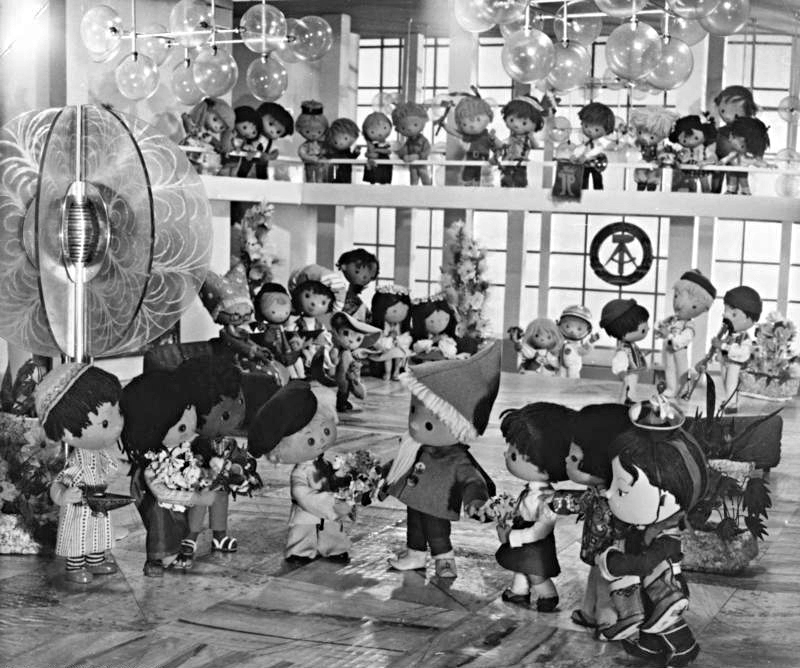
Unser Sandmännchen in the Palace of the Republic

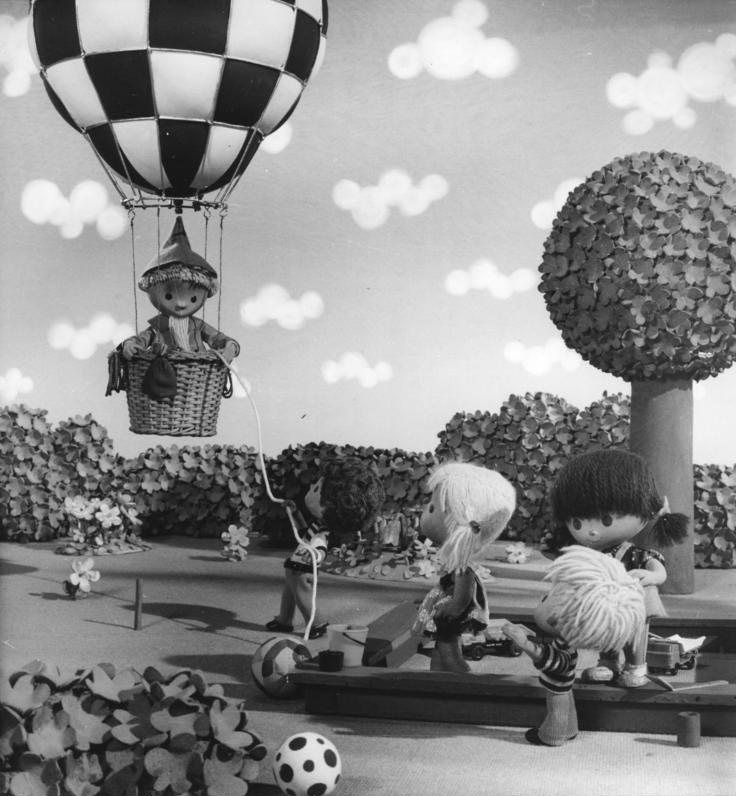
Unser Sandmännchen in a hot air balloon

Unser Sandmännchen ("Our Little Sandman"), Das Sandmännchen ("The Little Sandman"), Der Abendgruß ("The Evening-Greeting"), Abendgruß ("Evening-Greeting"), Der Sandmann ("The Sandman"), Sandmann ("Sandman"), Sandmännchen ("Little Sandman") is a German children's bedtime television program using stop-motion animation. The puppet was based on the Ole Lukøje character by Hans Christian Andersen.

Two versions of Sandmännchen were created: one in East Germany (Unser Sandmännchen), and one in West Germany (Das Sandmännchen).

The series is the longest-running animated television series in history; additionally, it is the TV show with the most episodes in history.

== Background ==
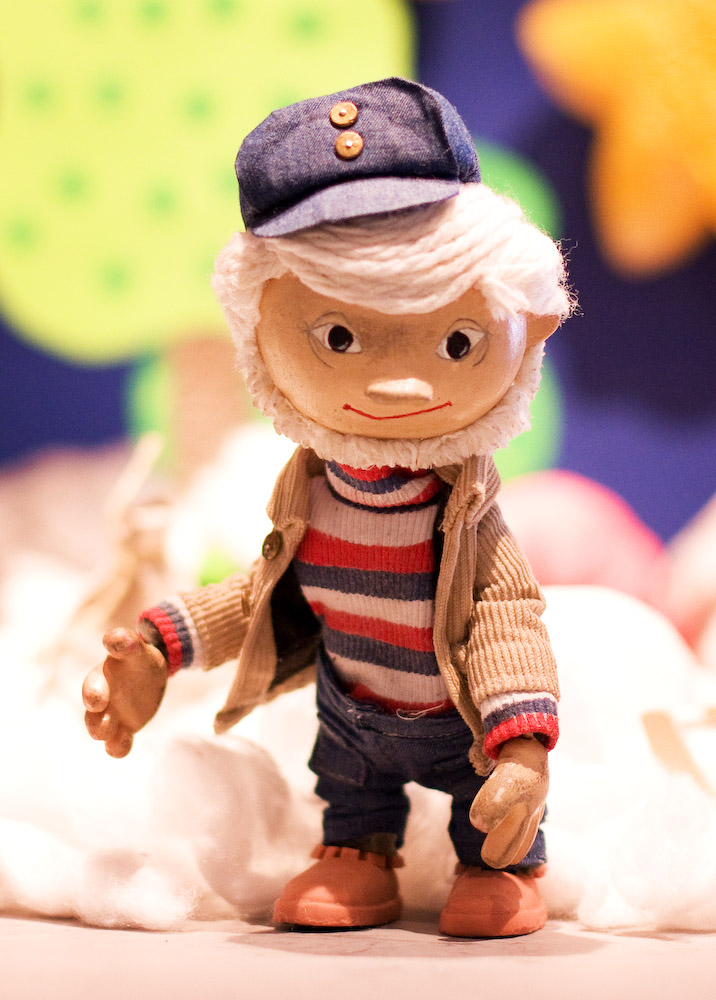
The West German version of Sandmännchen did not last as long as the East German version that today's German children know as the only one.

The original idea came from Ilse Obrig, who in 1950 changed from East Berlin's Berliner Rundfunk (BERU) to West Berlin TV and radio station Sender Freies Berlin (SFB). With the help of author Johanna Schüppel, she developed a working version of the character and its story in 1958. The Little Sandman himself first appeared on screen in West Berlin in Sandmännchens Gruß für Kinder (Sandmännchen's Greeting to Children) on 1 December 1959, and other episodes were soon made.

However, already on 22 November 1959 (only three weeks after the production had started), East German television Deutscher Fernsehfunk (DFF) began broadcasting its own Unser Sandmännchen, complete with its own "good night, children" character, also called Sandmännchen.

Both West and East Berliners preferred the Eastern version. Created by the puppetmaster and director Gerhard Behrendt, the East German show represented everyday life, travel, and fantastic adventures. The character often showcased socialist technological achievements, such as the use of awe-inspiring vehicles like futuristic cars and flying devices. It was very popular with GDR citizens to the point that after the wall fell, former citizens lamented the appropriation of the beloved cartoon by corporate West German television.

The production of the West German version of Sandmännchen ceased in 1989, before the fall of the Berlin wall. The east version is produced until now.

A full-length feature film, The Sandman and the Lost Sand of Dreams (German: Das Sandmännchen – Abenteuer im Traumland, literally "The Little Sandman – Adventure[s] in Dreamland"), was released in 2010.

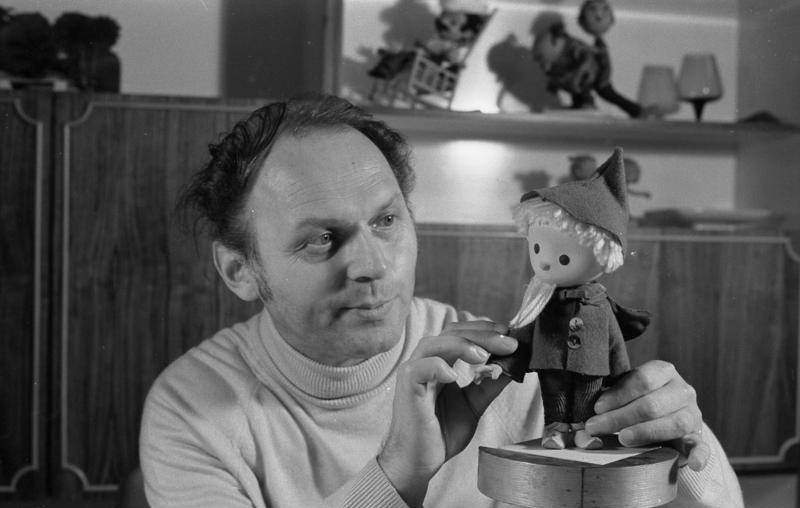
Gerhard Behrendt in 1979 with one of his Sandmännchen

== Theme tune ==
Wolfgang Richter composed the theme to the East German programme in just three hours one evening. Wolfgang Krumbach wrote the text. It was sung by the Rundfunk-Kinderchor Berlin.

Opening verse (on the Sandman's arrival):

Sandmann, lieber Sandmann, es ist noch nicht so weit!
Wir sehen erst den Abendgruß, ehe jedes Kind ins Bettchen muß,
du hast gewiß noch Zeit.

Translation:

Sandman, dear Sandman, it's not yet time!
First we'll watch the "Evening Greeting" before every child must go to bed.
Surely you have time for that.

There was a second verse which was dropped after the German reunification because it mentions the East German Fernsehfunk which no longer existed:

Sandmann, lieber Sandmann, hab nur nicht solche Eil!
Dem Abendgruß vom Fernsehfunk lauscht jeden Abend alt und jung,
sei unser Gast derweil.

Translation:

Sandman, dear Sandman, don't be in such a rush!
Everyone, young and old, listens to Fernsehfunk's "Evening Greeting" every night.
Please be our guest for that.

Closing verse (when he leaves):

Kinder, liebe Kinder, das hat mir Spaß gemacht.
Nun schnell ins Bett und schlaft recht schön.
Dann will auch ich zur Ruhe gehn. Ich wünsch' euch gute Nacht.

Translation:

Children, dear children, that was fun.
Now, quick, to bed and sleep tight.
Then I will also go and rest. I wish you a good night.

The score and overall design of the show was remarkably elaborate for a children's television production. The Sandman often visited other countries, and this fact was frequently emphasised by the use of traditional instrumentation and harmony added to the score.

== International broadcasts ==
The East German show was shown in many countries, including western countries like Finland, Sweden, Denmark and Norway. The show was named "Jon Blund" in Norway, "John Blund" in Sweden and "Nukkumatti" in Finland.

The theme song in Norway went as follows:

Hvem er denne karen med skjegg og lue på?
Han ligner litt på nissen i grunn, det er ikke ham det er Jon Blund.
Han besøker store og små.

In English, this means:

Who is this man with a beard and a hat on?
He looks a bit like santa actually, but it's not him it's Jon Blund.
He visits children big and small.

The first verse of the theme song in Swedish was:

Titta, kom och titta, kom sätt er här omkring.
Det dröjer säkert ännu en stund innan sömnen kommer med John Blund.
Han vill visa oss någonting.

In English, this means:

Look, come look, come sit down around here.
It will surely be a while yet before sleep comes with John Blund.
He wants to show us something.

The theme song in Finland was:

Nukkumatti, nukkumatti lasten, illoin kulkee, heittää unihiekkaa.
Päivän leikit aika lopettaa on, kun TV:n iltasatu alkaa.
Satu päättyi näin ja lapset käyvät jo nukkumaan, siis hyvää yötä.

In English, this means:

Sandman, the children's own Sandman, makes his rounds at night, sprinkling dream sand.
It's time to cease the games of the day, when the TV bedtime story begins.
Thus ended the fairy-tale, and the children are already going to bed, so good night.

== Supporting characters ==
The Sandmännchen stories contained a number of characters who remain popular today:

- Pittiplatsch, a little round-bodied kobold, with his friends Schnatterinchen, a duck, and Moppi, a dog.
- Herr Fuchs, a fox, and his friend Frau Elster, a magpie.
- Plumps, a water sprite, and his friend Küken, a baby chicken.

== In popular culture ==
Even after German unification merged the former German Democratic Republic into the Federal Republic of Germany, the Sandmännchen has retained a following, and it continues to be shown every night on German television. Periodic references have been made to it in film and literature.

- In 2009, the band Oomph! released the single "Sandmann". The song is about the child poverty in Germany and has many references to Sandmännchen.
- Unser Sandmännchen is featured in the 2003 film Good Bye, Lenin!.
- The German industrial metal band Rammstein uses the opening monologue from the West German Sandmännchen, Nun, liebe Kinder, gebt fein Acht. Ich habe euch etwas mitgebracht (Now, dear children, pay attention. I have brought you something), in the intro to their song "Mein Herz brennt". The original demo version of the song was called "Sandmann". In the demo version, the contents had a darker tone than the finished version. In "Sandmann", a psychopath has murdered the real Sandmann, and masquerades as him.
- The Norwegian 52 minute long documentary Sandmann – Historien om en sosialistisk supermann (Sandmännchen – The History of a Socialistic Superman) by Jannicke Systad Jacobsen from 2005 looks back on the rise and fall of East German socialism through the tales of Sandmann.
- Unser Sandmännchen is the protagonist of the pop-essay La Repubblica di Sabbiolino - DDR... ma non troppo! (The Sandman Republic - DDR… but not too much!), by italian journalist Francesco Cristino published in Italy in 2020.

== See also ==
- List of animated television series
