= Astra Digital Radio =

Defunct digital radio transmission system

- Company type: System
- Industry: Digital radio
- Predecessor: Digitales Satellitenradio
- Founded: 1995; 30 years ago
- Defunct: April 30, 2012
- Fate: Ceased
- Successor: DVB-S / DVB-S2
- Parent: SES S.A.

Astra Digital Radio (ADR) was a system used by SES for digital radio transmissions on the early Astra satellites, using the audio subcarrier frequencies of analogue television channels. It was introduced in 1995. As of February 2008, there were still 51 stations transmitting in this format. ADR ceased on 30 April 2012 when analogue broadcasts on Astra 19.2°E ended.

== Details ==
The format used one mono audio subcarrier, which was normally allocated to an additional audio track or radio station, or one channel of a stereo audio track/station. The carrier was digitally modulated and carried a 192 kbit/s, 48 kHz sampled MPEG-1 Layer II (MP2) encoded signal. 9.6 kbit/s was available for data.

Special receivers were required to listen to ADR stations, although some combined analogue/digital satellite boxes and later standard analogue boxes were equipped to decode it.

ADR was succeeded by DVB-S, with which it is incompatible, despite both being transmitted using MP2 and generally at the same bitrates. As a result, when the final analogue switch-off on the Astra 1 satellites occurred, ADR became obsolete.

The majority of the channels to have been broadcast using ADR were in the German language. Because of this, the system can in a way be seen to have replaced the German Digitales Satellitenradio system, dating from the 1980s, which used an entire satellite transponder to carry 16 NICAM encoded radio stations, and which closed in 1999.

== Channel Listing ==
- DLF
- DKultur
- Deutsche Welle
- Bayerischer Rundfunk
  - Bayern 1
  - Bayern 2
  - Bayern 3
  - BR Klassik
  - B5 plus
- Hessischer Rundfunk
  - You FM
  - hr1
  - hr2
  - hr3
  - hr4
  - hr-info
  - hr1 plus
  - Hr-klassik
- Mitteldeutscher Rundfunk
  - MDR Figaro
  - MDR Info
  - MDR Jump
  - MDR Sputnik
- Norddeutscher Rundfunk
  - N-Joy
  - NDR 2
  - NDR Info
  - NDR Info Spezial
  - NDR Kultur
- Südwestrundfunk
  - DASDING
  - SWR1 BW
  - SWR1 RP
  - SWR2 BW
  - SWR2 RP
  - SWR3
  - SWR Cont.Ra
  - SWR4 BW
  - SWR4 RP
- Westdeutscher Rundfunk
  - COSMO (German radio station)
  - WDR 2
  - WDR 3
  - WDR 4
  - WDR 5
  - 1LIVE
  - KIRAKA
  - VeRa
- Radio BOB
- Radio Bremen
  - Bremen Eins
  - Bremen Zwei
  - Bremen Vier
- Saarländischer Rundfunk
  - SR 1 Europawelle
- Rundfunk Berlin-Brandenburg
  - Antenne Brandenburg
  - radioBERLIN 88,8
  - Inforadio
  - Kulturradio
  - Fritz
  - radioeins
- Swiss Broadcasting Corporation
  - Radio SRF 1
  - Radio SRF 2 Kultur
  - Radio SRF Musikwelle
  - Radio SRF Virus
  - La Première (Switzerland)
  - Option Musique
  - Couleur 3
  - RSI Rete Uno
  - Radiotelevisiun Svizra Rumantscha
