= Biedenkopf transmitter =

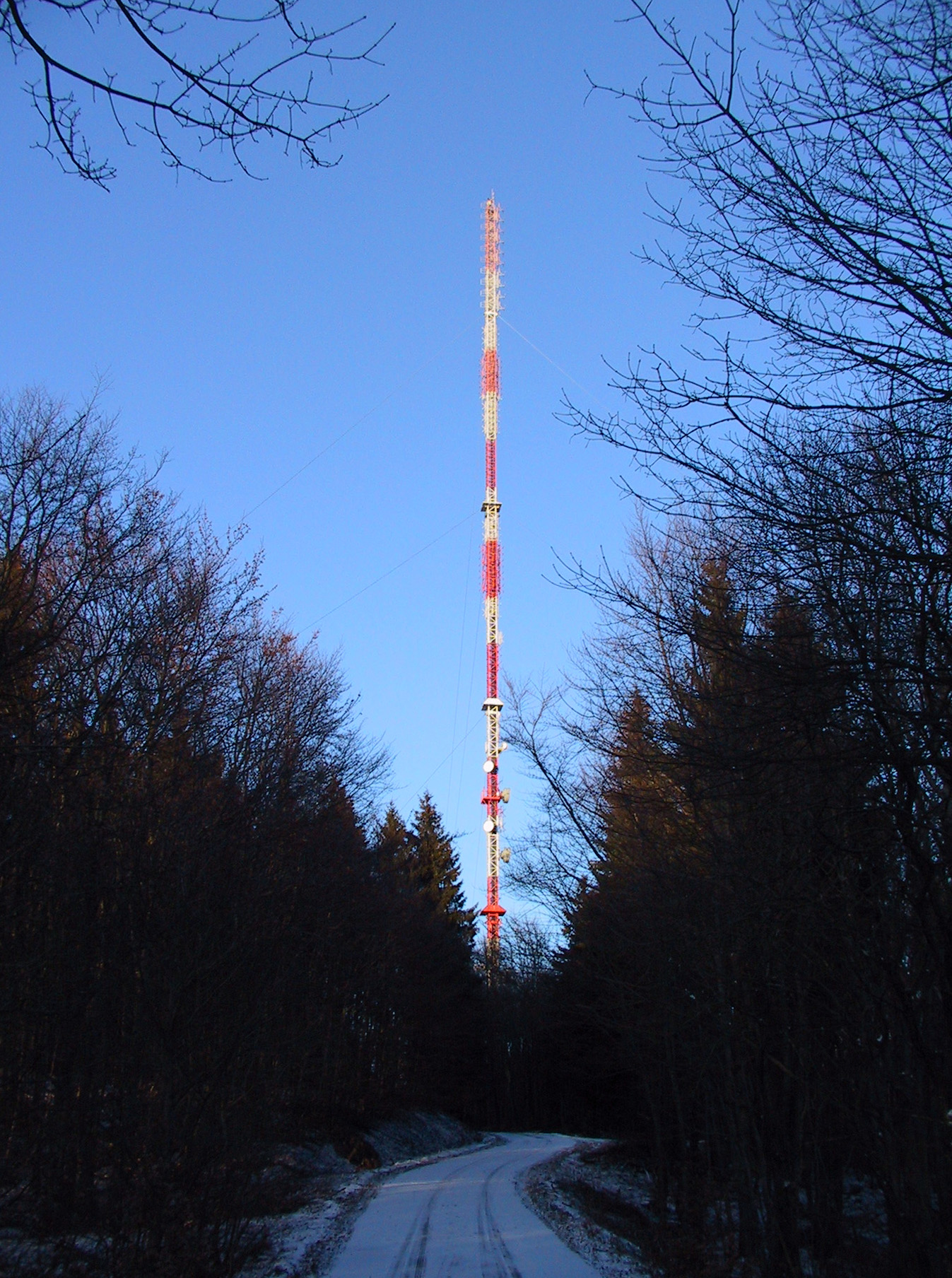
- Biedenkopf transmitter
- Location: Sackpfeife, Biedenkopf, Hesse, Germany
- Coordinates: 50°57′04″N 8°31′55″E
- Built: 1953

The Biedenkopf transmitter is a transmission tower owned by the Hessischer Rundfunk. It is located on the 673 meters (2,208 ft) high Sackpfeife mountain near the city of Biedenkopf in Hesse, just a few meters away from the border to North Rhine-Westphalia. It is used for radio and formerly TV broadcasting.

Because of the close proximity to North Rhine-Westphalia, the facility is also used by the Westdeutscher Rundfunk to cover certain valleys which cannot be reached by either Ederkopf transmitter or Nordhelle transmitter. However, the signals are transmitted omnidirectionally and so cover large parts of Hesse as well.

The transmitter was first constructed in 1953 as a steel tube pylon. This was replaced in 1987 by a 210 meters high guyed lattice tower.

== Coverage ==
The Biedenkopf transmitter covers mostly the very mountainous region around the cities of Waldeck and Frankenberg to the north, as well as the area to the south up to the city of Limburg an der Lahn. It also happens to reach far into the east and south-east direction including Frankfurt am Main. The signals do not reach into the west because of the unsuitable geography, and the Taunus mountain range restricts the range to the south.

== Channels ==
- Analog radio:
  - hr1 - 91.0 MHz (100 kW)
  - hr-info - 99.6 MHz (100 kW)
  - hr3 - 87.6 MHz (100 kW)
  - hr4 - 104.3 MHz (100 kW)
  - You FM - 102.3 MHz (10 kW)
  - WDR 2 - 92.3 MHz (15 kW)
  - WDR 3 - 88.7 MHz (15 kW)
- Analog television (no longer on air)
  - VHF 2 - ARD (100 kW)

The 102.3 MHz frequency originally transmitted hr4 as well, but with a different regionalization. This was considered superfluous, so the frequency was redelegated to the news radio station hr-info in 2005. However, because it still transmits primarily in the north-east direction, it can hardly be heard in the main populated cities. In 2013, the 99.6 MHz frequency, which previously transmitted hr2-kultur, was changed to hr-info and the 102.3 was changed to You FM.

The Biedenkopf transmitter was one of the few transmitters in Germany to use the Band I for TV broadcasting. It is not used for digital television, however, signals may be received from the Angelburg transmitter.
