= Hoher Meissner transmitter =

Hoher Meissner transmitter is a facility for FM and TV broadcasting on Hoher Meissner mountain in Northern Hesse. The transmitter was inaugurated in 1952.

The mediumwave transmission at the transmitter used a 150-metre-tall (490 ft) guyed steel-tube mast radiator insulated against ground between 1952 and 1995. The mast was replaced by a 155-metre-tall (509 ft) guyed lattice steel mast at 51°12′34″N 9°50′45″E which was switched off in December 2009 due to funding reasons and demolished on 16 March 2015. In opposite to the old mast radiator, the tower was grounded and equipped with a cage antenna for mediumwave.

Another mediumwave transmitter which is a 95-metre-tall (312 ft) guyed steel-tube mast radiator is located at 51°12′29.6″N 9°50′42.3″E. The mast was first used to form together with the 150-metre-tall (490 ft) steel-tube mast radiator as a directional antenna with a minimum pointing toward Sweden and as backup antenna. Until the demolition of its main mediumwave transmitter in 2015, the transmitter was used for the latter purpose as the Hoher Meissner mediumwave transmitter, which formed together with Weiskirchen transmitter as a single-frequency transmitter, which operated permanently with omnidirectional radiation pattern.

FM and TV broadcasts are transmitted using a 220-metre-tall (720 ft) guyed lattice steel mast with a weight of 180 tons. The mast is at 51°12′26.3″N 9°50′51.5″E.

Further, there at 51°12′25″N 9°50′46″E is a 40-metre-tall (130 ft) free-standing lattice tower at Hoher Meissner transmitter, which is used for mobile radio services and equipped with a backup antenna for FM transmission.

== Radio stations ==
Station	Frequency	ERP	Remarks
hr-info	594 kHz	100 kW	single frequency network with Weiskirchen transmitter
hr1	99,0 MHz	100 kW	
hr2	95,5 MHz	100 kW	
hr3	89,5 MHz	100 kW	
hr4	101,7 MHz	100 kW	Local program for Northern and Eastern Hesse
Hit Radio FFH	105,1 MHz	100 kW	Local program for Northern Hesse
