= Tim Frühling =

German radio personality

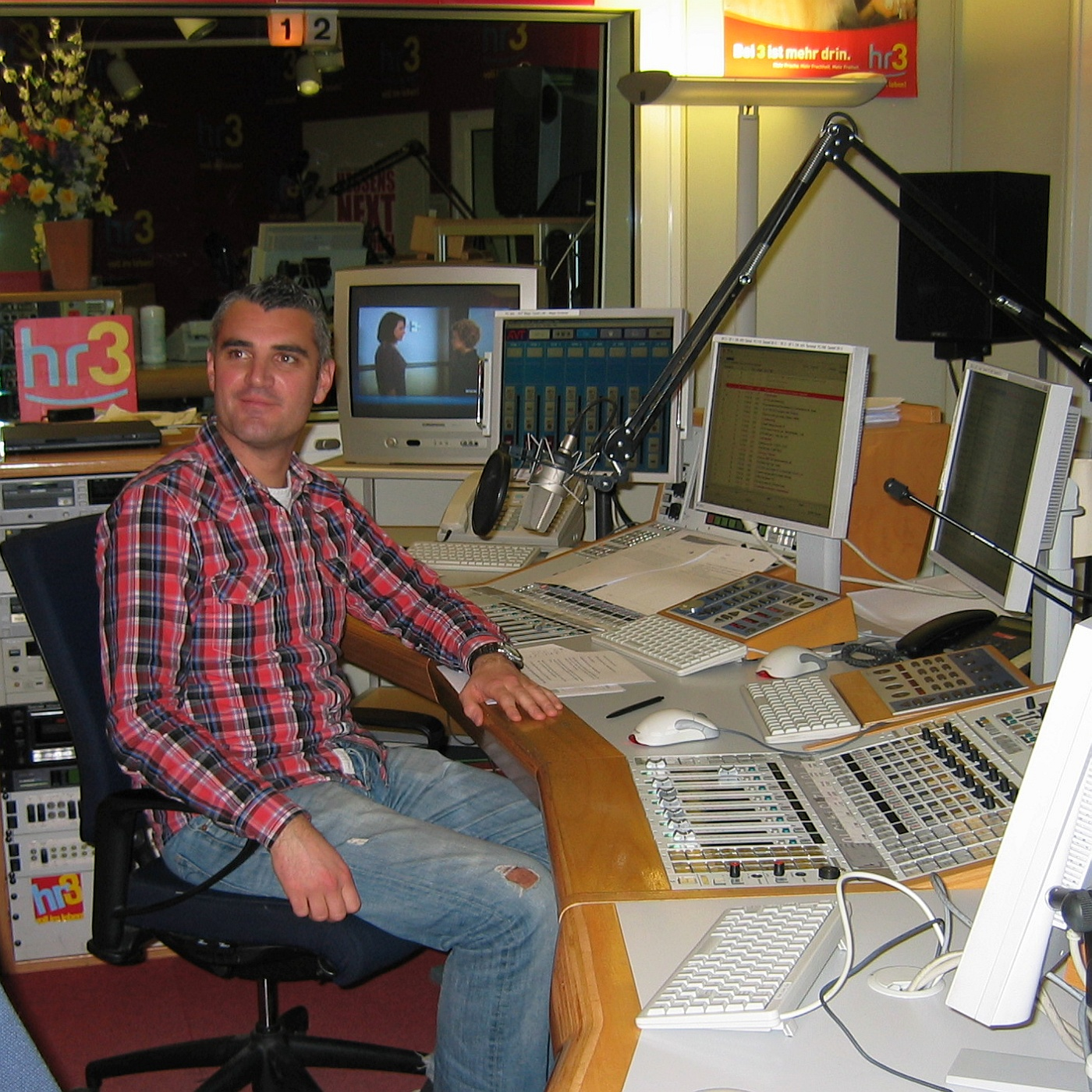
Tim Frühling at the recording studio of Hessischer Rundfunk (HR 3), Frankfurt am Main

Tim Frühling (born 29 July 1975 in Wolfenbüttel) is a German disc jockey and Radio personality for Hessischer Rundfunk.

Between 1998 and 2003, hr XXL before working for You FM and between the years of 2000 and 2003 and from 2005 and 2008, Frühling was news broadcaster for the breakfast show. After years of working for radio, Frühling made his television debut in 2008 as weather presenter for TV-hr. In 2009, Frühling provided the ARD television commentary for the 2009 Eurovision Song Contest when regular commentator Peter Urban was too ill to attend the contest in Moscow, Frühling continues to be associated with Eurovision by providing the radio commentary for HR Radio and NDR Radio listeners which he has done since 2006.
