= Maintower =

maintower
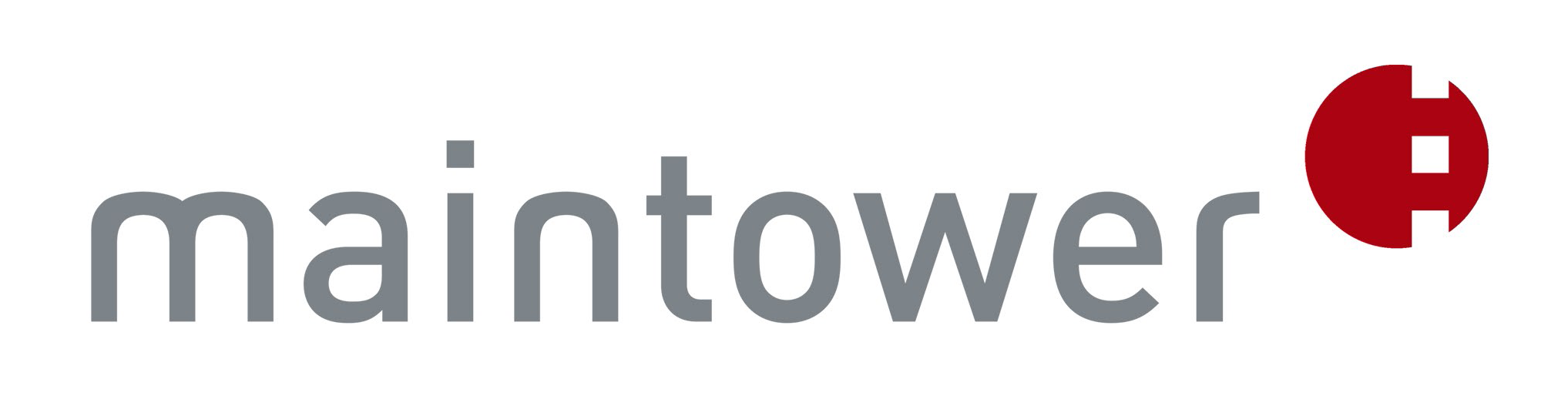
- Presented by: Petra Neftel; Susann Atwell; Sonya Kraus; Peter Alexander Rothkranz
- Country of origin: Germany
- Original language: German

Production
- Producer: Hessischer Rundfunk
- Production location: Frankfurt

Original release
- Release: 15 January 2001

maintower is the tabloid magazine of the Hessischer Rundfunk broadcast on hr-fernsehen from Monday to Friday at 6:00 pm.

The 25-minute programme covers tabloid topics with a focus on crime and accidents as well as other police and fire brigade missions in and around Hessen.

== Production ==
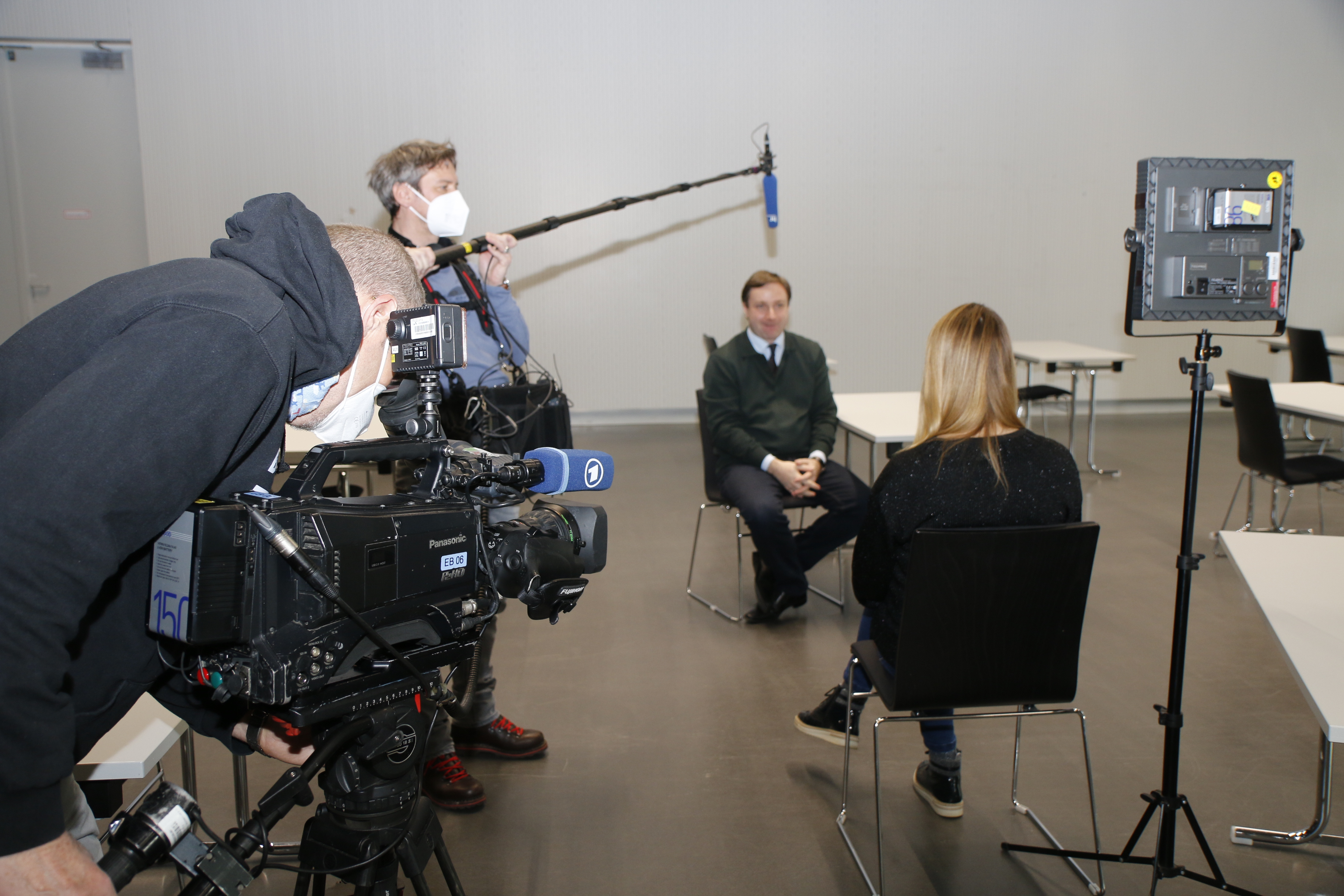
TV 20 years Wikipedia

Up until 2015 it was broadcast from the Main Tower in Frankfurt am Main (the "highest television studio in Europe"). Due to the studio's closure for cost reasons, in autumn 2015, the programme has been broadcast from Hessischer Rundfunk's television Studio 5 in the Funkhaus am Dornbusch in Frankfurt-Nordend using an elaborate virtual studio set with a computer-generated 3D skyline of Frankfurt.

== Spin-offs ==
=== maintower weekend ===
In addition to the main edition (Monday-Friday), there is the Saturday edition called maintower weekend, in which a half-hour review of the week's topics is given.

=== maintower kriminalreport ===
maintower kriminalreport started in 2016. This programme replaced the previous kriminalreport hessen and reports on unsolved criminal cases and asks viewers to help clarify them. A police officer is usually also a guest in the studio to present details of the cases in conversation with the moderator. The programme is moderated by Robert Hübner.

== Presenters ==
- Kirsten Rademacher (2001–2008)
- Georg Holzach (2001–2008)
- Hendrike Brenninkmeyer
- Petra Neftel (2012–present)
- Susann Atwell (2009–present)
- Sonya Kraus (2017–present)
- Peter Alexander Rothkranz (2001–present)
