= 1990 in German television =

This is a list of German television related events from 1990.

== Events ==
- 29 March - Chris Kempers & Daniel Kovac are selected to represent Germany at the 1990 Eurovision Song Contest with their song "Frei zu leben". They are selected to be the thirty-fifth German Eurovision entry during Ein Lied für Zagreb held at the German Theatre in Munich.
- 8 July - West Germany beat Argentina 1-0 to win the 1990 World Cup at Rome, Italy.
- 3 October - German reunification: All FTA channels broadcast reunification themed events in Berlin and other major cities.

== Debuts ==
=== Domestic ===
- 7 January - Talk im Turm (1990–1999) (Sat. 1)
- 19 January - Zeil um Zehn (1990–1993) (Hessen 3)
- 21 January - Tutti Frutti (1990–1993) (RTL)
- 23 August - Mit den Clowns kamen die Tränen (1990) (Das Erste)
- 17 October - Ein Schloß am Wörthersee (1990–1993) (RTL)
- 27 December - Kartoffeln mit Stippe (1990) (ZDF)

=== International ===
- 9 January - (Australia) Hey Dad..! (1987–1994) (Das Erste)
- 21 March - (United States) Moonlighting (1985–1989) (RTLplus)
- 21 July - (United States) Teenage Mutant Ninja Turtles (1987–1996) (RTL)
- 8 September - (United Kingdom) Count Duckula (1988–1993) (Das Erste)
- 13 October - (Japan) / (Netherlands) Alfred J. Kwak (1989–1990) (ZDF)
- 10 November - (Japan) / (Switzerland) Pingu (1986-2006, 2017–Present) (ZDF)
- 13 November - (France) / (Canada) Babar (1989–1991) (ARD)
- December - (United States) / (Canada) My Pet Monster (1987) (Tele 5)

=== Armed Forces Network ===
- (United States) The Super Mario Bros. Super Show! (1989)
- (United States) Eureeka's Castle (1989–1995)
- (United States) Chip 'n Dale: Rescue Rangers (1989–1990)
- (United States) / (Canada) Beetlejuice (1989–1991)
- (United States) Garfield and Friends (1988–1994)

=== BFBS ===
- 24 September - (United Kingdom) Emlyn's Moon (1990)
- 1 October - (United Kingdom) The Brollys (1990)
- 10 October - (United Kingdom) The Dreamstone (1990–1995)
- 12 October - (United Kingdom) Rosie and Jim (1990–2000)
- 2 November - (United Kingdom) How 2 (1990–2006)
- 3 December - (United Kingdom) Keeping Up Appearances (1990–1995)
- 12 December - (United Kingdom) Uncle Jack (1990–1993)
- (United Kingdom) Nellie the Elephant (1990–1991)
- (Australia) Round the Twist (1989–2001)
- (United Kingdom) Alfonso Bonzo (1990–1991)
- (United Kingdom) Tales of Aesop (1990)
- (United Kingdom) Kappatoo (1990–1992)
- (United Kingdom) The Gift (1990)
- (United States) / (United Kingdom) / (Wales) The Further Adventures of SuperTed (1989)

== Television shows ==
=== 1950s ===
- Tagesschau (1952–present)

=== 1960s ===
- heute (1963-present)

=== 1970s ===
- heute-journal (1978-present)
- Tagesthemen (1978-present)

=== 1980s ===
- Wetten, dass..? (1981-2014)
- Lindenstraße (1985–present)

== Ending this year ==
- 22 December - Formel Eins (1983-1990)

== Deaths ==
Date	Name	Age	Cinematic Credibility
22 October	Kurt A. Jung	67	German actor & voice actor
