= Hr-Sendesaal =

hr-Sendesaal
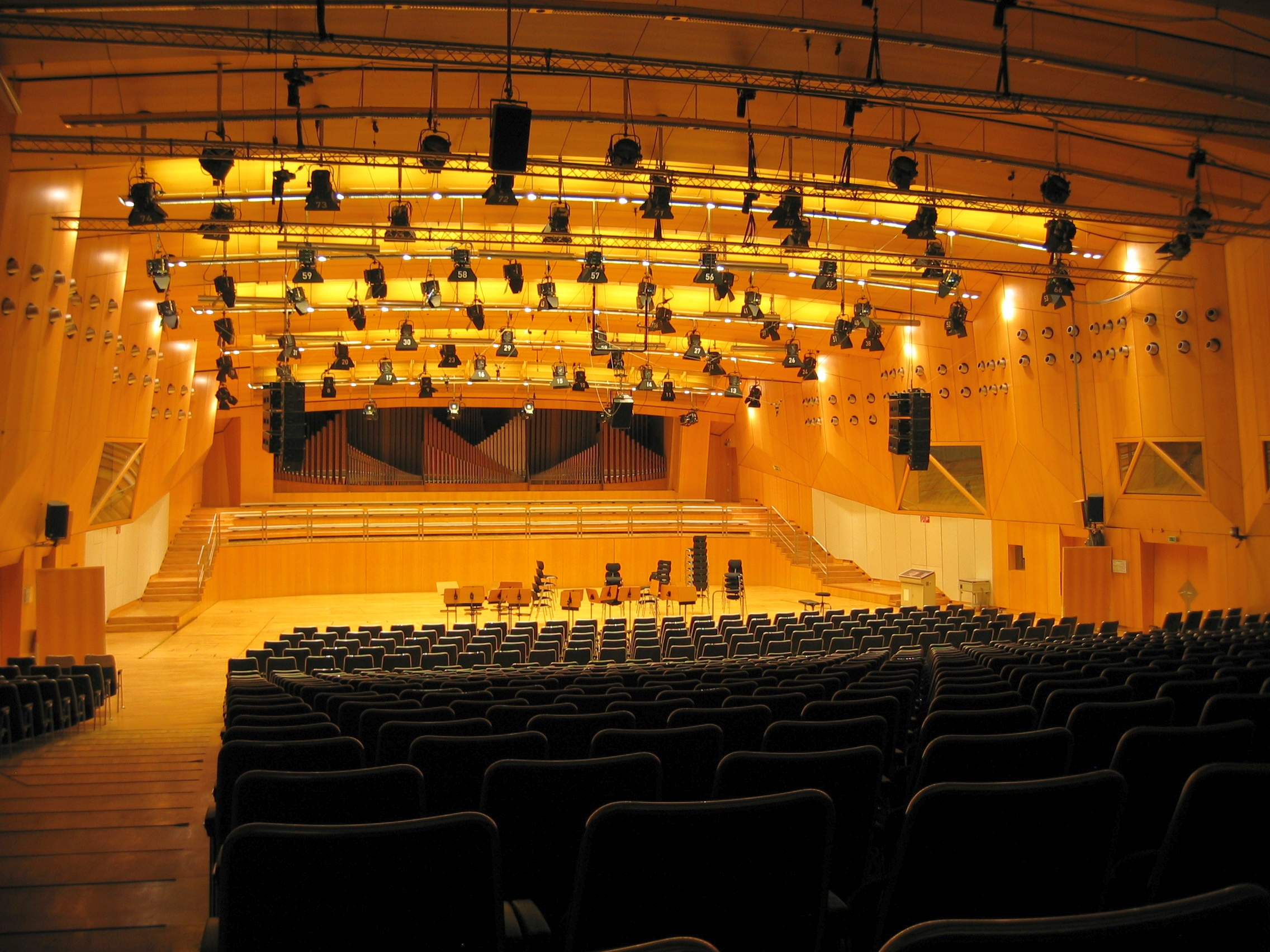
- The large hall in 2011
- Interactive map of the hr-Sendesaal area
- Former names: Großer Sendesaal des Hessischen Rundfunks (1954–1988)

General information
- Location: Frankfurt am Main, Germany
- Coordinates: 50°08′09″N 08°40′33″E
- Construction started: 28 February 1953
- Completed: 1954
- Inaugurated: 30 September 1954
- Renovated: 1987–1988
- Client: Frankfurt Radio Symphony
- Owner: Hessischer Rundfunk

Design and construction
- Architect: Gerhard Weber

Other information
- Seating capacity: 840
- Public transit: Dornbusch (5 min); Hauptfriedhof (5–10 min)

hr-Sendesaal, formerly Großer Sendesaal des Hessischen Rundfunks (Large broadcasting hall of Hessischer Rundfunk) is a music hall and former television studio based in Frankfurt am Main, Germany. The hall is part of the Broadcasting House Dornbusch, the former headquarters of the German public broadcaster Hessischer Rundfunk (HR).

== History ==
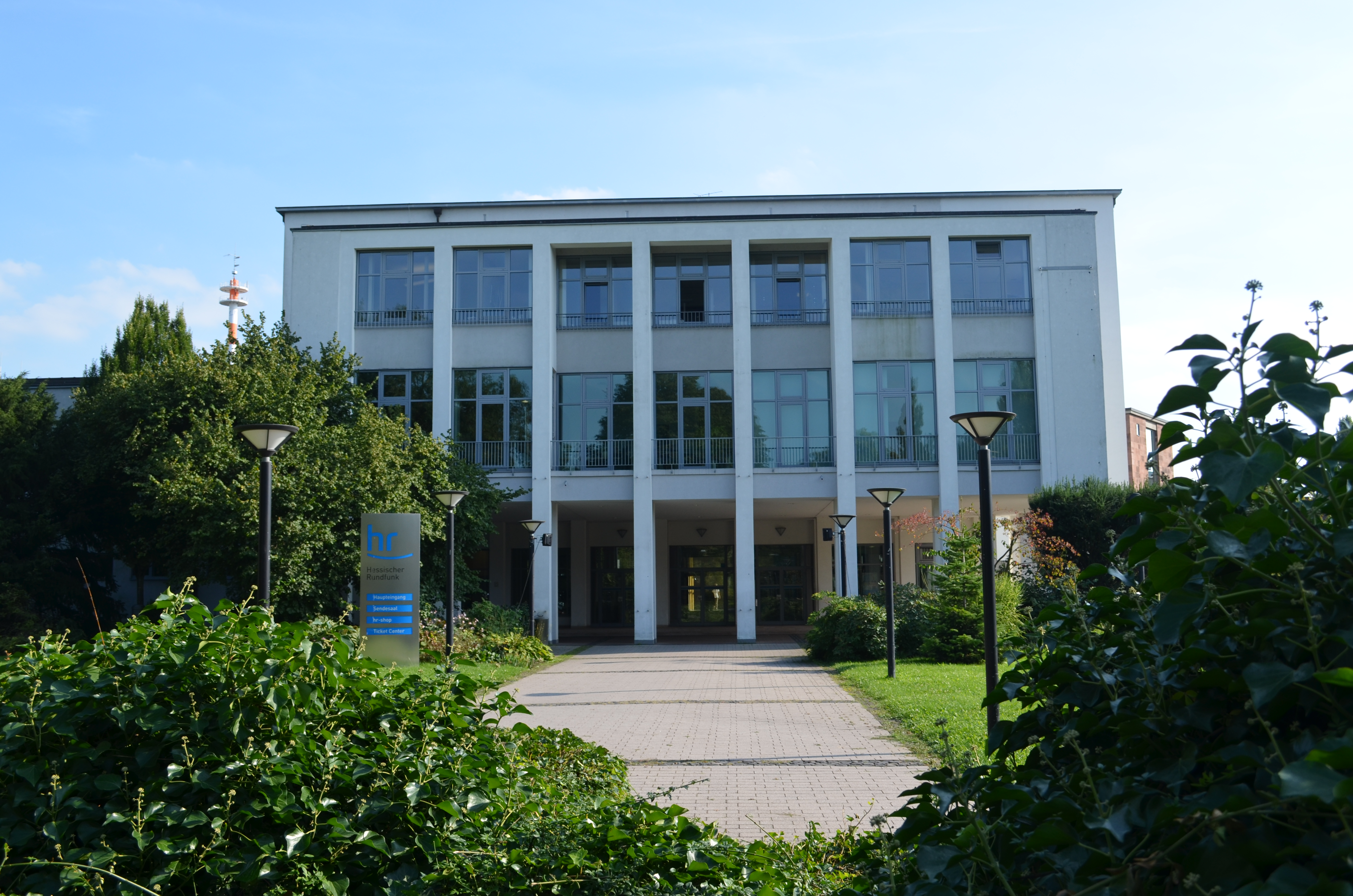
Broadcasting House Dornbusch in September 2013

Construction of the music hall began when the foundation stone was laid on 28 February 1953, and it was ready for use on 30 September 1954. The building was designed by the architect Gerhard Weber. The hall has 840 seats and was built to house the broadcaster's own radio orchestra, Frankfurt Radio Symphony and was the workplace of the orchestra until 1987–1988, when the hall was completely rebuilt and changed its name to hr-Sendesaal.

The version of Karlheinz Stockhausen's Mixtur for reduced orchestra was premiered here, as part of the Darmstädter Ferienkurse on 23 August 1967 by the Ensemble Hudba Dneska conducted by Ladislav Kupkovič, to whom this version is dedicated.

Although the hall was mainly built for radio, television broadcasts were also produced from there in the early years. In 1957, it hosted the Eurovision Song Contest. The hall was also used for lectures and debates. In 1968, a debate was held on the German Notstandsgesetze (Emergency Acts) which were introduced that year.

The concert hall was built with technically modern equipment and is tailored for radio and sound productions rather than TV productions. Walls and ceilings are equipped with 60,000 sound-absorbing round wooden boards, installed to provide the best possible acoustics for radio. Today, the hall is used for concerts and radio recordings in all genres.

== See also ==
- Broadcasting House Dornbusch

Preceded by Teatro Kursaal; Lugano	Eurovision Song Contest; Venue; 1957	Succeeded by AVRO Studios; Hilversum
