= Andreas Raselius =

Andreas Raselius, also known as Andreas Rasel (c. 1563 – 6 January 1602) was a German composer and kapellmeister during the Renaissance. He worked for much of his career as a teacher and cantor in Regensburg, before being appointed as the court conductor of the Elector Palatine in Heidelberg. He is today best noted as the author of a cycle of motets for use throughout the year, the first such cycle to be composed in the German language, which was published in 1594.

== Early life and education ==
Raselius was born at Hahnbach in the Upper Palatinate of Bavaria around 1563. He was the son of Thomas Raselius or Rasel, a Lutheran preacher. The elder Raselius had studied at Wittenberg University under the Lutheran theologian and reformer Philip Melanchthon – who had Latinised Raselius's name – before moving to Hahnbach and marrying a woman from nearby Amberg. From 1575 Andreas Raselius was educated at the Amberg Gymnasium and in November 1581 he enrolled at the University of Heidelberg. He gained a baccalaureate within only eight months and was awarded an M.A. in February 1584.

== Career ==
A strict Lutheran, he declared himself "outraged at the Calvinist machinations" that he witnessed in Heidelberg and moved later in 1584 to Regensburg. There he became a teacher of the 2nd class at the city's Gymnasium Poeticum and was appointed as cantor at the gymnasium and the Neupfarrkirche, the town's first Lutheran church.

As well as working as a composer and an author of musical theory and historical works, Raselius also published a chronicle history of Regensburg in both Latin and German (though only the latter version has survived). The breadth of his intellectual interests was illustrated by his library, which was catalogued after his death. It was found to comprise nearly 600 titles including over 475 humanistic and literary works, focusing primarily on philosophy and theology, as well as music treatises and works.

In 1590 Raselius was promoted to the rank of teacher of the 4th class. In 1600 the Elector Palatine Frederick IV appointed him as Hofkapellmeister – court conductor – at Heidelberg, but Raselius died there less than two years later on 6 January 1602. He was widely respected among both Protestants and Catholics because of his classical learning and Christian character, which was regarded by contemporaries as exemplary.

== Family ==
On 7 September 1584 in Regensburg, Raselius married Maria Erndl († 1617 in Wiefelsdorf near Schwandorf, where she was cared for by her brother-in-law, Pastor Andreas Pankratìus Frauenholz), the daughter of Mattis Erndl, the Apothecary at the Kohlenmarkt - later known as the Mohrenapotheke in Regensburg.

They had nine children:

1. Barbara * 1587
2. Anna * 1588; † 1588 in Regensburg
3. Tobias * 1589; † 1589 in Regensburg
4. Christopherous Andreä * 2 July 1590 in Regensburg; † 1661 in Spraken
5. Wolfgang * 1592 in Regensburg † ca. 1601
6. Georgius Secundus * 1595 in Regensburg; † 21 October 1657 in Regensburg
7. Johannes Jonas * 1596 in Regensburg
8. Johannes Thomas * 1598 in Regensburg; † 3 November 1623 in Vöklabruck
9. Walpurg * 1599 in Regensburg; † ca. 1600 in Heidelberg

== Works ==
Raselius published a number of volumes of Lutheran musical compositions in German, most notably Teutscher Sprüche auss den sontäglichen Evangeliis durchs gantze Jar (1594), a cycle of fifty-three motets for five parts. These Evangelienmotetten or Gospel motets were settings to music of verses from the Gospel, and the complete cycle was intended to be performed over the course of a year of Sundays. It was the first motet cycle covering the whole year to be written in the German language, following the Latin cycles published a few years earlier by Johann Wanning. The German musicologist Walter Blankenburg wrote that "the settings are often superior to similar works by other composers, even by later masters such as Vulpius, Johann Christenius and Melchior Franck; only Demantius may be considered an exception".

He also wrote two chorale collections published in 1591 and 1599, which furthered the earlier efforts of Lucas Osiander to devise chorales that could be used in a congregational setting. Raselius's chorales were altogether more sophisticated than those of Osiander, covering five voices with the inner parts given further musical interest. Raselius's work shows evidence of both Flemish and native German influences, but his compositions of 1595 show that he had thoroughly mastered the polychoral techniques of Italy.
