= Weiskirchen transmitter =

Weiskirchen
- Coordinates: 50°3′19.7″N 8°51′44.9″E

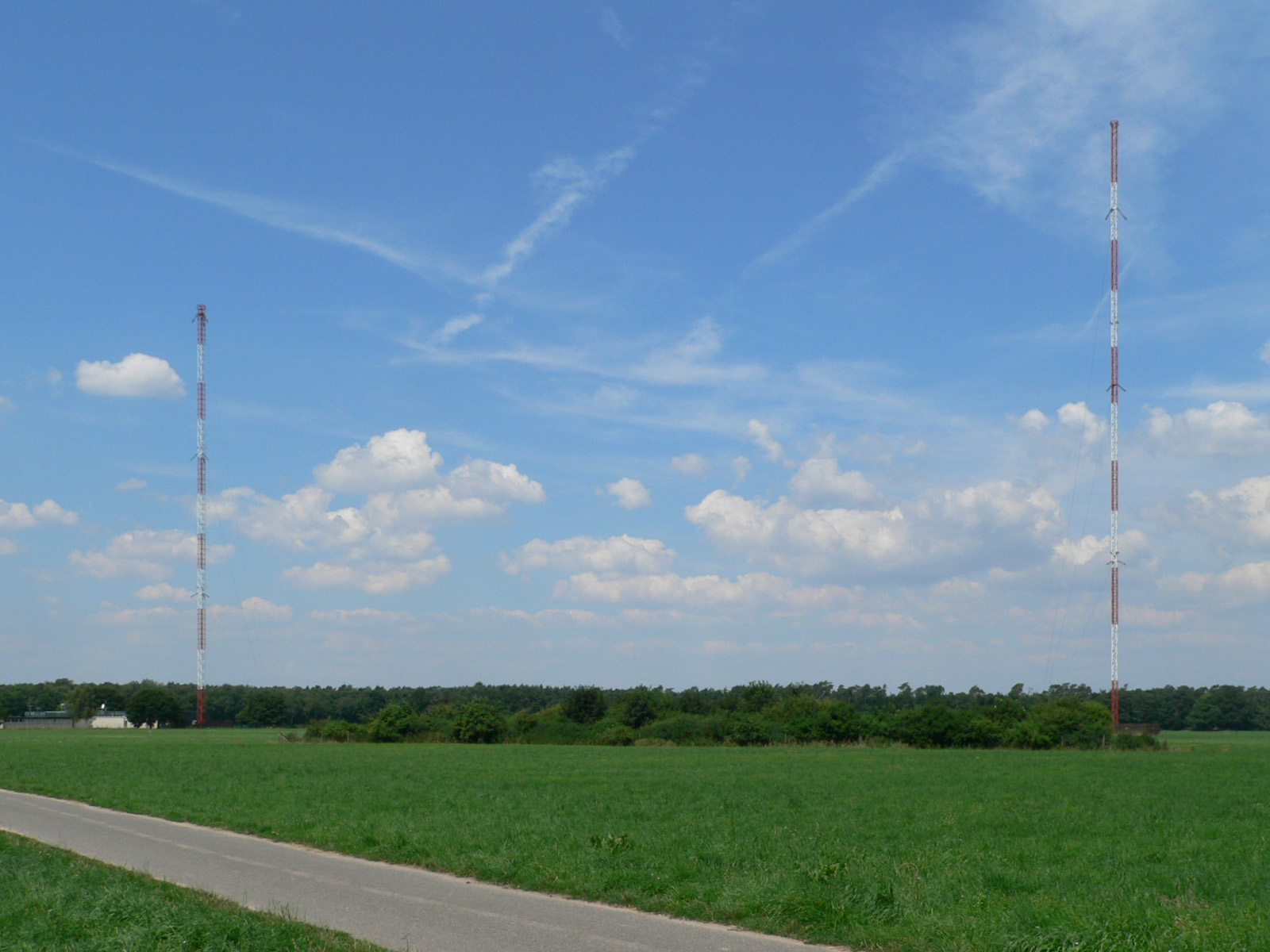
Weiskirchen transmitter

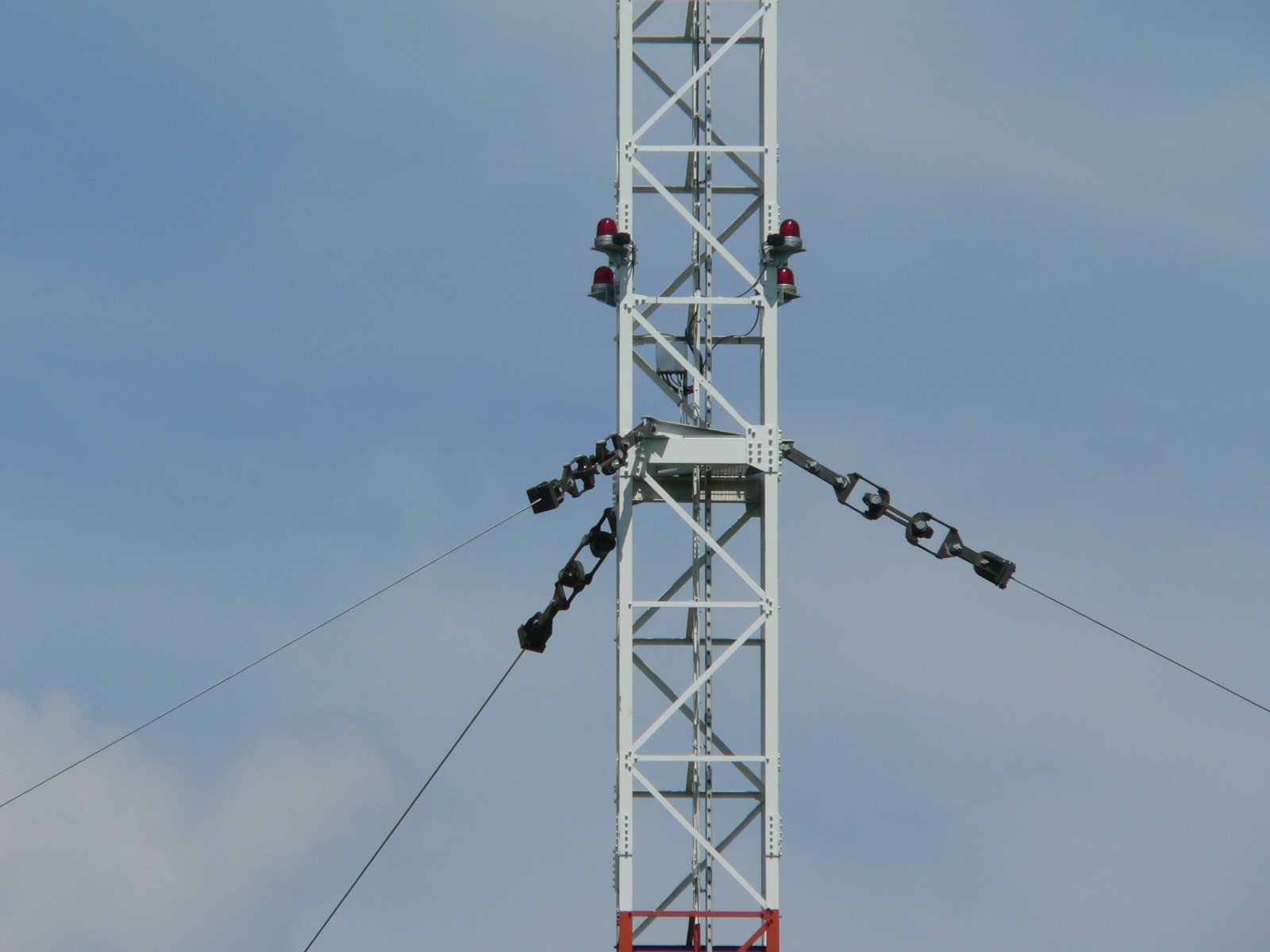
Guy anchoring of the mast of Weiskirchen transmitter

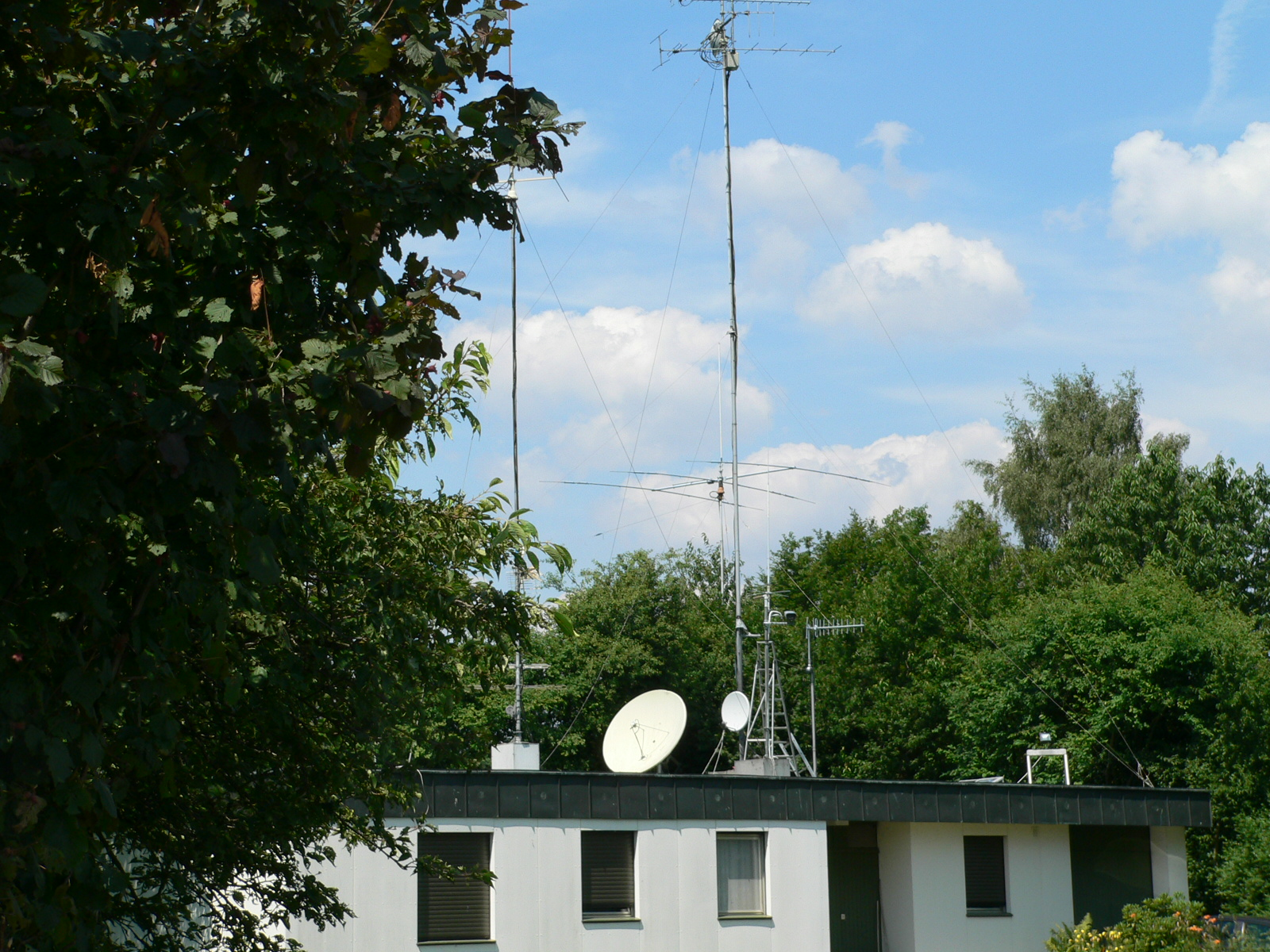
Antennas on the building of Weiskirchen transmitter

Weiskirchen transmitter, is a mediumwave broadcasting tower in Weiskirchen, Germany. It is the property of Hessischer Rundfunk. It was built in 1967.

== Frequency and transmission diagrams ==
The Weiskirchen transmitter broadcast on 594 kHz. Until the conversion of medium-wave transmission frequencies to nine divisible kilohertz values, its transmission frequency was 593 kHz. Until 1994 the transmitting power was 400 kW when it was reduced to 300 kW.

Weiskirchen transmitter has a directional antenna, which consists of two 126.5-metre-tall guyed lattice steel mast radiators (50°3′19.7″N 8°51′44.9″E and 50°3′22.8″N 8°51′57.1″E) insulated against ground.

As opposed to other guyed masts used for medium wave transmission, its guys are not partitioned with insulators. Instead, they are grounded over coils situated close to the anchor block, which are tuned so that high frequency currents in the guys are as low as possible.

The Weiskirchen transmitter forms together with Hoher Meissner transmitter a single frequency network. The directive pattern of the transmitter has a maximum toward northwest and two minima pointing toward northeast and southeast. By regulation of the feeding power for each mast, the directivity pattern can be changed, in cooperation with Hoher Meissner transmitter the maximum even to the east.

== Operation ==
A signal is transmitted by cable from the studio in Frankfurt to Weiskirchen transmitter. The transmitter uses two water-cooled final stages, which are switched in parallel, in order to avoid complete transmitter failure in case of a failure of a single tube. The power supply comes under normal conditions from the local 20kV electric grid.

For backup power, a Diesel generator, starts after 10 to 20 seconds. The current for starting the generator is supplied by a small accumulator unit, which is connected automatically at power failure. If the Diesel generator is used as power source, transmission power is reduced to 100 kW.

== Program supply ==
Weiskirchen and Hoher Meissner supplied without frequency shift mobile receivers as car radios with the first program of the Hessian Broadcasting Company. Until 1989, this program was predominantly radiated due to the large range of mediumwaves in the night hours by change of the directivity patterns of both transmitters towards east.

The broadcast program is mainly the news program HR info. Between 1900 hours to 2200 hours, programmes for foreign workers are transmitted. It is also used for Bundestag debates and the Hessian federal state parliament or for other special life reports such as live sports reports. It was planned to convert the Weiskirchen transmitter to digital broadcasting by using DRM transmissions.
