= Hr-skyline =

hr-skyline
- Germany
- Broadcast area: Hesse

Programming
- Language: German
- Format: Financial news/talk

Ownership
- Operator: Hessischer Rundfunk (HR)

History
- First air date: 5 January 1998
- Last air date: 30 August 2004

hr-skyline was a German, public radio station owned and operated by the Hessischer Rundfunk (HR).

== History ==
Broadcasting started in 1998. Hr-skyline's main focus was on economic reporting. To underline this focus, the studios of hr-skyline was located in Frankfurt's Bankenviertel on the 54th floor of the Main Tower. Its successor hr-info has taken over this focus in part, but is increasingly aimed at sports and culture lovers.

The programme could be received via DAB and from 30 June 2003 to 30 August 2004 also via the medium wave frequency 594 kHz. From then on, the medium wave frequency was used to broadcast the medium wave programme hr-info plus until it was finally switched off on 1 January 2010.
