= Gustav Gunsenheimer =

German director of church music and composer (1934–2026)

- Gunsenheimer, c. 2020
- Born: 10 March 1934; Kunzendorf, Gau Silesia, Nazi Germany
- Died: 3 March 2026 (aged 91)
- Occupations: Director of church music; Composer; Academic teacher
- Organizations: St. Lukas, Schweinfurt; Musikhochschule Würzburg
- Awards: Order of Merit of the Federal Republic of Germany

Gustav Gunsenheimer (German: [ˈɡʊnzn̩ˌhaɪmɐ]; 10 March 1934 – 3 March 2026) was a German director of church music and a composer of mostly sacred music and chamber music, including the Evangelienmotette Die Versuchung Jesu. First an elementary school teacher, he worked for decades as the church musician at St. Lukas in Schweinfurt, where he held annual festivals. He conducted notable choirs, was responsible in the Bavarian organization of chorale conductors, and was a lecturer at the Musikhochschule Würzburg.

== Life and career ==
Born in Kunzendorf, Grafschaft Glatz, on 10 March 1934 to parents from Franconia, Gunsenheimer left Silesia with his family at the end of World War II. He attended a gymnasium in Bamberg with a focus on old languages in Bamberg, graduating with the Abitur in 1954. He studied to be a music teacher. He taught at elementary schools, from 1956 in Bad Königshofen.

His career as a musician began in 1962 when he founded and conducted a regional teachers' choir later named "Fränkischer Singkreis" (Franconian singing circle). In 1963 he passed the Kantorenprüfung (church musician's exam) at the Kirchenmusikschule Bayreuth. In 1966 the state of Bavaria granted him a scholarship to study for two years at the Mozarteum in Salzburg. His studies included "Elementare Musik- und Bewegungserziehung" (Elementary music and movement pedagogy), which brought him into personal contact with Carl Orff.

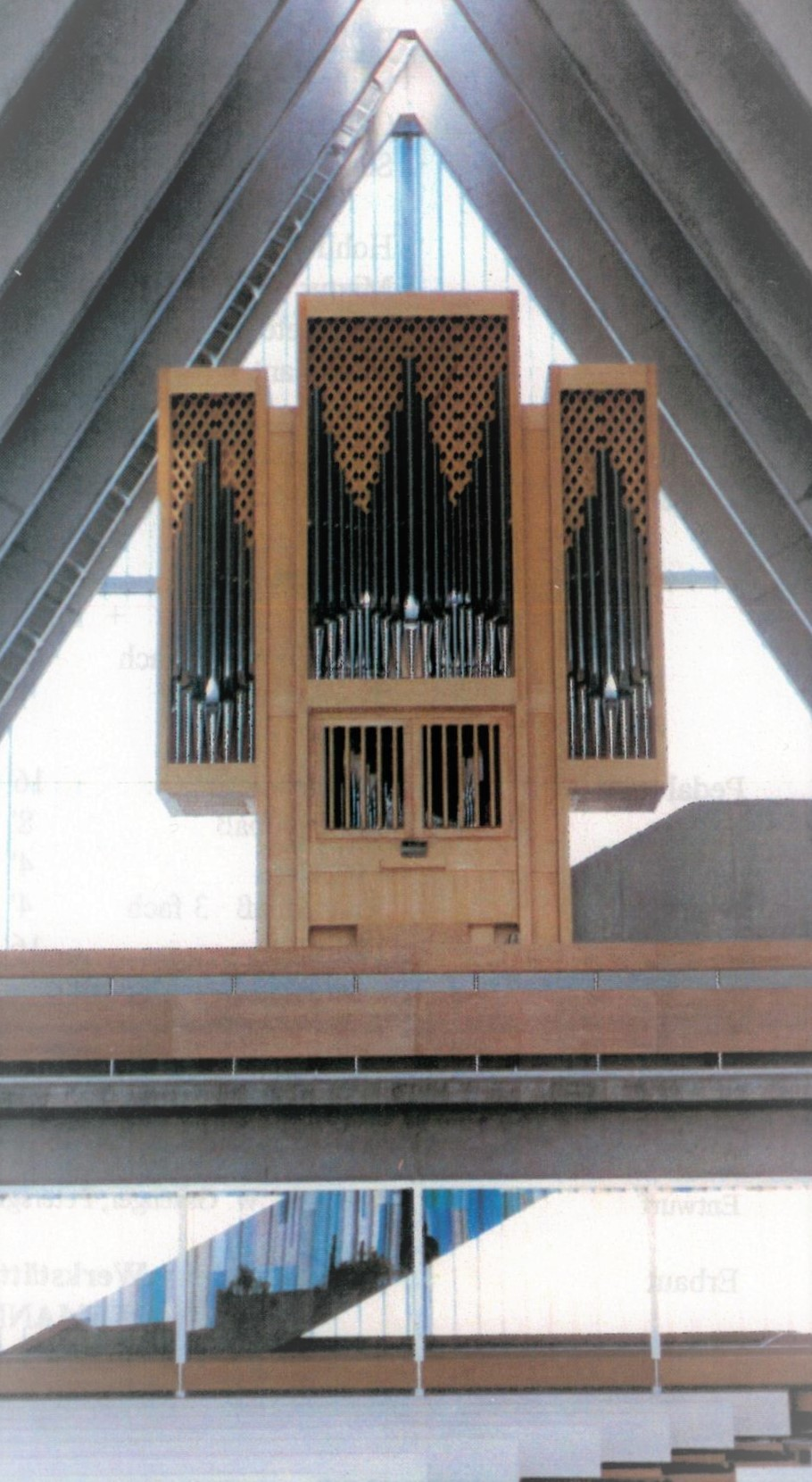
Organ at St. Lukas, Schweinfurt

He returned to Schweinfurt in 1968, teaching music at an elementary school and leading the oratorio choir "Liederkranz Schweinfurt" for almost 30 years, until 1997. He was the church musician at St. Lukas from 1969. He initiated in 1970 an annual festival "Musiktage am Hochfeld" (Music days at the Hochfeld, the location of the church), as well as another regular festival "Musik um die Osterzeit" (Music for Eastertide). For these concerts, he was able to attract musicians who would not normally play at a small church, such as the Bamberger Streichquartett (Bamberg String Quartet), the violinist Wolfgang Forchert, soloists at the beginning of their careers such as soprano Barbara Schlick, contralto Waltraud Meier, tenor Christoph Prégardien, and the guitarist Michael Tröster. He grouped the music around themes, such as anniversaries of composers. In 2013, the programs focused on music set to texts by Friedrich Rückert, to commemorate his 150th anniversary of death. With "Fränkischer Singkreis", he performed the world premieres of 14 works at a composition competition in Bad Brückenau.

Gunsenheimer succeeded Kurt Thomas after his death in 1973 as conductor of the annual Chorleiterwoche im Landesverband Evangelischer Kirchenchöre, a week of meetings and music for Bavarian Protestant chorale conductors that he led until 2002. He had a position as lecturer at the Fachhochschule Würzburg, later also at the Musikhochschule Würzburg in music therapy. He was responsible for the church music at St. Lukas until the first Sunday in Advent of 2015.

In 1983, he was honoured with the title Kirchenmusikdirektor (director of church music with regional responsibility). In 1987 he was awarded the Stadtmedaille Schweinfurt, and on 12 December 1989 the Cross of the Order of Merit of the Federal Republic of Germany. He received the Bach medal from Evangelischer Posaunendienst Deutschland in 2010, and became an honorary member of the Fränkischer Sängerbund association in 2011.

Gunsenheimer died on 3 March 2026, at the age of 91. (Note: Some sources mislabel his age as "92".)

== Selected compositions ==
Gunsenheimer composed cantatas, motets, and instrumental music for brass ensemble, organ, and orchestra. Many of his compositions relate to traditional models, and can be performed by amateurs. His Evangelienmotetten were written for advanced choirs. The German National Library lists 292 works including:

- Auf meinen lieben Gott, chorale preludes for organ or harpsichord, on "Auf meinen lieben Gott"
- Lobe den Herren, suite for soprano recorder and organ
- Drei Intraden (Three Intradas) for brass
- Benedicamus Domino, six European Christmas carols in the original language and translation for mixed choir a cappella
- Vater unser (Lord's Prayer), for four-part men's choir a cappella
- Jesus und die zwei Jünger, Evangelienmotette for Lent on the story of Jesus and two disciples (1966)
- Die Versuchung Jesu, Evangelienmotette (1968), published by Carus-Verlag in 1968
- Jesus und die Tochter des Jairus, Evangelienmotette for Lent on the raising of Jairus' daughter (1969)
- Die Heilung des Blinden, Evangelienmotette for Lent on healing the blind near Jericho (1970)
- Jesus und das kanaanäische Weib, Evangelienmotette for Lent on Jesus and the Canaanite woman (1971)
- Jesus und der ungläubige Thomas, Evangelienmotette for a Sunday after Easter on the story of the doubting Thomas (1972)
- Christ ist erstanden for trumpet and organ, published by Möseler, Wolfenbüttel, in 1983
- Lob, Ehr' und Preis, partita for winds (organ ad lib.) in four movements to "Nun danket alle Gott"
- Sonata No. 1 for alto recorder (or flute) and harpsichord (or guitar), also Concertino for alto recorder (or flute) and Zupforchester (orchestra of plucked string instruments), published by Vogt & Fritz, Schweinfurt
- Sonata No. 2 for solo and continuo, published by Vogt & Fritz, Schweinfurt
- Sonatina for organ
- Der Sonnengesang des Franz von Assisi, cantata setting Canticle of the Sun, for soprano, alto and tenor soloists, winds and piano or orchestra, published by Strube
