= Hr-info =

hr-info
- Wer’s hört, hat mehr zu sagen. (Who's hearing it, has more of a say.)
- Germany
- Broadcast area: Hesse
- Branding: hr-iNFO

Programming
- Language: German
- Format: News

Ownership
- Operator: Hessischer Rundfunk (HR)
- Sister stations: hr1 hr2-kultur hr3 hr4 YOU FM

History
- First air date: 30 August 2004

Links
- Website: www.hr-inforadio.de

hr-info (official name hr-iNFO) is a German, public radio station owned and operated by the Hessischer Rundfunk (HR). The slogan of the station is Wer’s hört, hat mehr zu sagen. (Who's hearing it, has more of a say.) Former slogans were hr info – Radio im Klartext (hr info – Radio in plain language) and Das Wichtige wissen (Know the essentials).

The programming of hr-info varied in terms of content. The station with focus on speech broadcasts news, background information and sentiments in the sector of politics, business, education, and culture. Exclusive researched content is also edited for other information appropriations by Hessischer Rundfunk. In relation to the broadcasting area of HR, hr-info has the largest day range of all information radio stations by ARD with 406,000 listeners per day (Monday to Sunday, respectively from 5:00 a.m. to 12 a.m., listeners at the age of 14 and older).

== History ==
The precursor of hr-info was the business radio station hr-skyline. After the move of hr-skyline from the studios at Main Tower to Broadcasting House Dornbusch, the removal of hr-info as a news radio began in 2004. Its first air date was 30 August 2004. hr-info increased the listener figures continual, and the program focus has been expanded by science, education, and culture.

Development of the hr-info logo

Logo from 2004 to 2009

Logo from 2009 to 2015

Logo from 2015 to 2023

Logo since 2023

== Programming ==
Producing a word-oriented news station is the basic idea of hr-info. Instead of shows, there was a "Stundenuhr" from the very first at hr-info, a schema for the division of one broadcasting hour, which makes for the findability of the respective topics in one hour. There is also some space for advertising.

hr-info took over some news formats from hr1 after its transition into an oldies format. The station is commercial-free.

Stundenuhr for the current programming

Monday to Friday from 6:00 a.m. to 8:00 p.m.:

- xx:00: News, weather forecast, traffic report
- xx:05: Current reports and interviews
- xx:15: Business news (6:00 a.m. to 10:00 a.m. and 5:00 p.m. to 8:00 p.m.)
- xx:25: Current reports and interviews
- xx:30: News, weather forecast, traffic report
- xx:45: Current reports and interviews
- Since the beginning of the COVID-19 pandemic, the station uses the 30 minute schema (former the 20 minute schema) because it starts from the fact that the listenership changes completely within half an hour, especially in the morning, which is the most important time for the radio people. The reverse conclusion is that listeners should get all important information in 20 to 30 minutes. That's why hr-info repeats lots of already radiated reports, like also many other news stations. But the station doesn't want to be seen as a pure news radio – who wants that is supposed to be able to listen longer without get bored, while the experience by other information radios has shown that many people listen longer than 30 minutes. hr-info should report fast and comprehensevely about current events. Because of that, events of sport and other major news are also considered in the programming. In addition to that, hr-info broadcasts from Monday to Friday in the rush hour in the morning and in the afternoon focuses on special topics ("Das Thema"), which are often planned well in advance. In "Das Thema", a social topic is covered by four short reports from different perspectives.
- The evening programming begins from Monday to Friday at 7:05 p.m. with the context news show Der Tag from hr2-kultur, followed by the assumption of the ARD Tagesschau. On Fridays, the current programming is continued till the Tagesschau at 8:00 p.m. After that, a 15-minute-review to the current political events in Hesse, which is named "Der Tag in Hessen", is following. On Saturdays and Sundays, there is a reportage instead of this. Since changing the programming on 29 March 2021, pre-produced magazine programmes with focuses on politics, culture, education, and science are following. News and current affairs are only on air to 10:00 p.m., when the assumption of the ARD-Infonacht begins.

== RDS ==
As all radio stations of Hessischer Rundfunk, hr-info is also using the dynamic RDS-PS and is normally broadcasting the station name, phone numbers (e.g. traffic jam hotlines), or information.

== hr-info plus (abandoned) ==
On the medium frequency 594 kHz as soon as over individual cable- and satellite channels (DVB-S), the channel hr-info plus (sometimes also as hr-info+) was broadcast.

The hr-info plus station emerged from hr-chronos, which also broadcast debates till it was discontinued. hr-info plus was abandoned on 31 December 2009.

== Reception ==
The station is available in Hesse via FM broadcasting and DAB+, and beyond Hesse via DVB-C, DVB-S and livestreaming. On 11 February 2013, some of hr2-kultur's FM frequencies were taken over by hr-info, leading to an improved reception, mostly in Central Hesse.
