= Evangelienmotetten =

Evangelienmotetten or Gospel motets (sometimes called Spruchmotetten, "Bible-text motets") were settings to music of verses from the New Testament. They were selected as an essence or Kernspruch ("text-kernel") of the verses in question, with the intention of highlighting dramatically or summarising in a terse fashion a significant thought from the Gospels.

There is a long tradition in Germany, dating back to the medieval era, of highlighting the importance of gospel readings through polyphonic musical settings of gospel texts. They became an increasingly popular genre from the 16th century onwards and were intended for use in Lutheran church services. They could thus be written in either Latin or German. The latter came to predominate by the end of the 16th century due to the emphasis placed by the Reformation on the need to make the Bible accessible to all people through the use of the vernacular language.

During the late 16th and early 17th centuries a number of composers drew on Gospel readings for an entire church year's worth of Sundays and feast days to create complete cycles of motets. Their text comprised phrases or paraphrases from the narrative readings or sometimes only the dialogue passages. A fashion for the latter prompted the development in Germany of the dramatic concertato dialogue from the 1620s onward. Composers of Gospel motet cycles included Leonhard Päminger, Johann Wanning, Andreas Raselius, Christoph Demantius, Thomas Elsbeth, Melchior Vulpius and Melchior Franck, whose work was gathered into collections by printers.

Gospel motets were the principal musical piece in the liturgy of the Mass, serving to enhance the reading of the Gospel lesson of the day immediately before the performance. By the later 17th century they were increasingly replaced by concertatos supplemented with arias and chorales and after 1700 by the cantata, which not only highlighted biblical passages but interpreted them as well. The genre fell out of general fashion by the early 18th century but was still in demand for use in funerals, as evidenced by the composition of motets by Johann Sebastian Bach for such ceremonies. Bach wrote for the function of enhancing the prescribed gospel reading several cycles of cantatas for all occasions of the liturgical year.

The manner in which Gospel motets were used within the Protestant German liturgy of the 17th century is unclear. Some musicologists have suggested that they were used as part of a seasonal cycle of liturgical readings, sung in place of the liturgical intonation or as an additional musical work to provide an exposition before the sermon. Motets which used the verbatim text of the Gospels may have been used to punctuate the recitation of the liturgy by the cantor or priest; at the point in the text where the motet setting began, the choir would take over, sing the motet and conclude the lesson. Alternatively they may have been related more to a tradition of exegetical and didactic practice to set out a narrative of Christ's life, thus being "attached to a broader base of devotional practice, rather than being confined to strict liturgical use", as Craig Westendorf has argued.

Evangelienmotetten were still composed in the 20th century, for example by Ernst Pepping who wrote Drei Evangelienmotetten for choir a capella, including Jesus und Nikodemus, in 1937–38. Gustav Gunsenheimer composed between 1966 and 1972 six motets for choir a cappella for five Sundays in Lent, including Die Versuchung Jesu (The temptation of Jesus), and one for a Sunday after Easter. Siegfried Strohbach composed 6 Evangelien-Motetten for mixed choir a cappella.
