= Hr1 plus =

hr1 plus

Germany
- Broadcast area: Hesse

Programming
- Language: German

Ownership
- Operator: Hessischer Rundfunk (HR)

History
- First air date: 5 January 1998
- Last air date: 4 February 2001

Links
- Website: hr1.de

hr1 plus was a German, public radio station owned and operated by the Hessischer Rundfunk (HR).
