= St. Lukas, Schweinfurt =

Coordinates: 50°03′24″N 10°14′39″E

St. Lukas
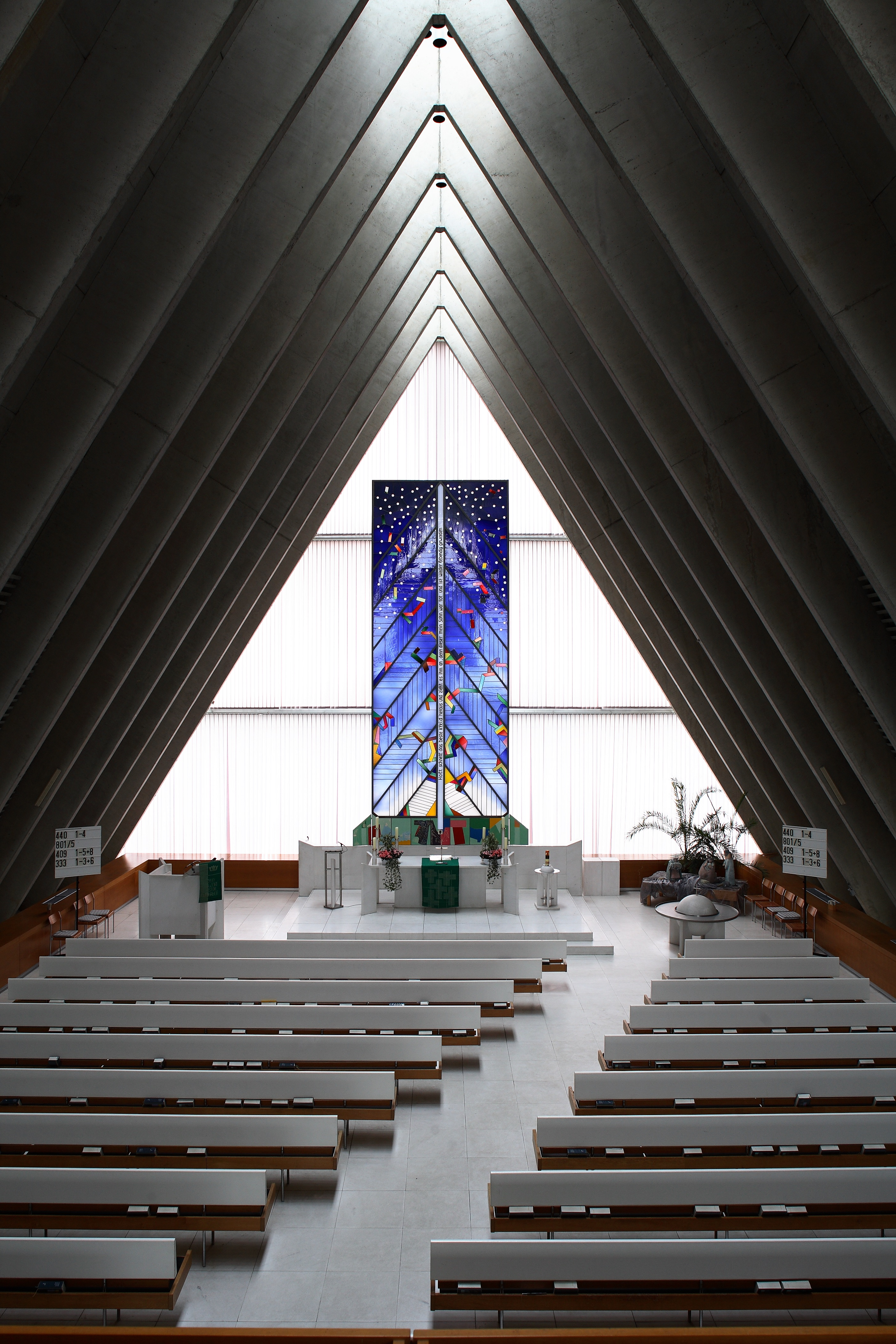
- Interior
- St. Lukas
- Location: Schweinfurt, Bavaria, Germany
- Denomination: Lutheran

History
- Consecrated: 1969

Architecture
- Architect: Gerhard Weber

St. Lukas is a Lutheran church and parish in a new area of Schweinfurt, Bavaria, Germany. It was designed by Gerhard Weber, his only church building, built from 1966 and completed in 1969. The parish belongs to the Schweinfurt Lutheran Deanery.

== History ==
After World War II Schweinfurt was expanded by a new suburban area named Hochfeld/Steinberg. A new Lutheran parish was created, and Gerhard Weber, professor at the Technical University of Munich, was won for the design of the church building. A parish hall was opened separately for the Deutschhof.

== Architecture ==
The church was erected on a high concrete foundation. It resembles a tent, as a symbol of the tent of God with men (Zelt Gottes unter den Menschen) with a steep roof almost to the ground. The tent is a reminder of no permanent state on earth (Hebrews 13,14), which was an actual concern looking at the refugees after World War II. The church is surrounded by other buildings such as a parish centre. The ground floor of the church building is an assembly hall, while the hall for services is in the upper floor. The church has no tower for bells, which hang in a bell chamber on street level instead.

The southern front of the church building, behind the altar, is mostly transparent glass, including daylight.. Materials are mostly glass, concrete and aluminum, related to Schweinfurt as an industrial city. Light colours dominate, such as white for the altar base.

== Features ==
Behind the altar is a stained glass installation mor than 8 m high, designed by Johannes Hewel from Rot am See and installed on 1 March 1992. Baptismal font, altar and pulpit are made from white marble. The pipe organ was built in 1978 by Otto Hoffmann. It features 17 stops on two manuals and pedal.
