= Zeil um Zehn =

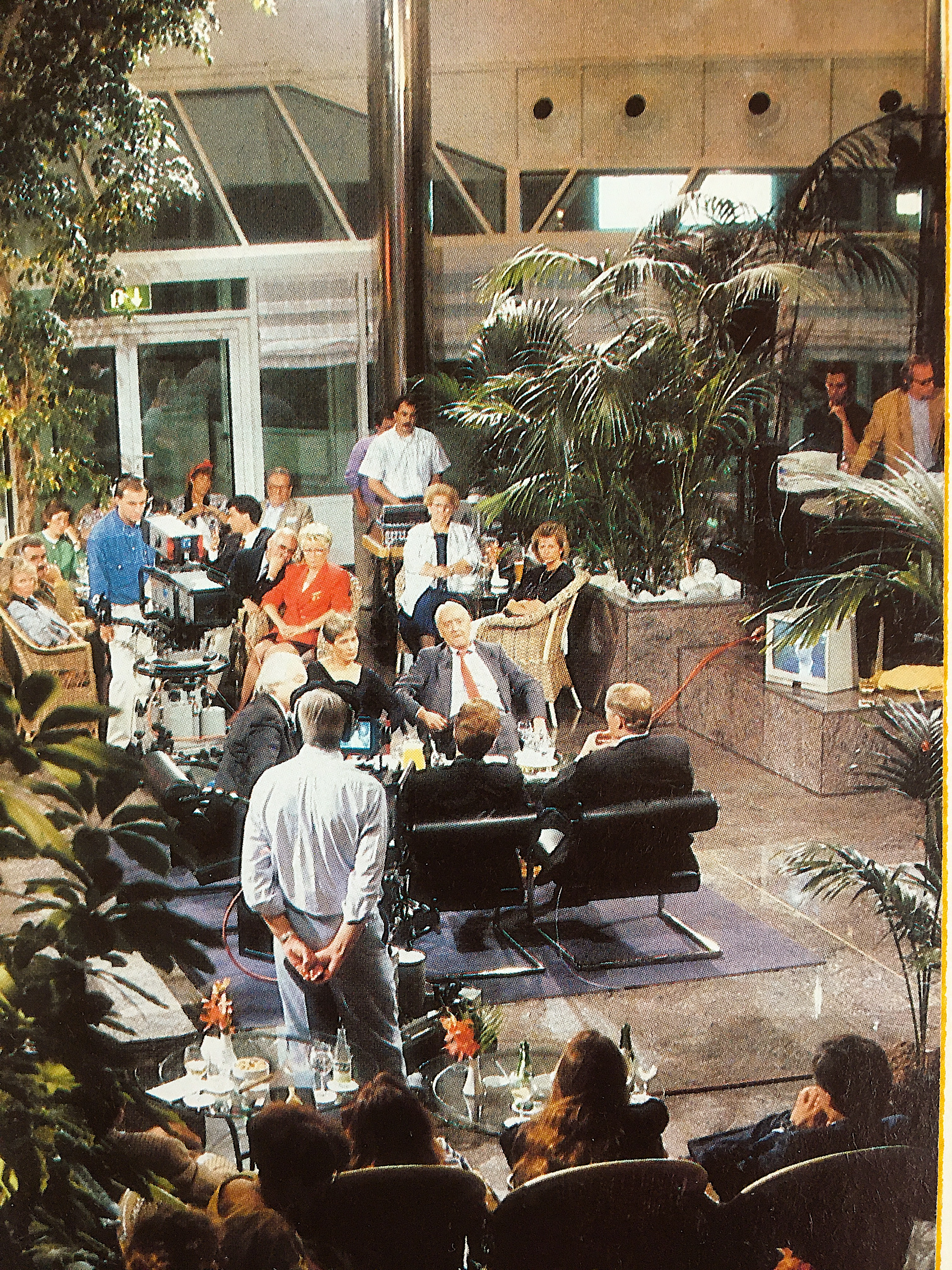
- Presented by: Wolfgang Korruhn; Beatrix Millies; Alice Schwarzer; Beate Wedekind
- Country of origin: Germany
- Original language: German

Production
- Producer: Hessischer Rundfunk
- Production location: Frankfurt

Original release
- Release: 19 January 1990 – 1993

Zeil um Zehn was a political talk show of the Hessischer Rundfunk, which was broadcast from 1990 to 1993 on Friday evenings on hessen 3.

== Overview ==
The weekly talk show was broadcast from the Arabella-Grandhotel in Frankfurt am Main in the immediate vicinity of the name-giving Zeil with guests from politics and entertainment for the first time on 19 January 1990 with the presenter Beate Wedekind. Other moderators were Alice Schwarzer, Wolfgang Korruhn and Beatrix Millies.

== Presenters ==
- Wolfgang Korruhn
- Beatrix Millies
- Alice Schwarzer
- Beate Wedekind
