= Trzebieszowice =

- Village
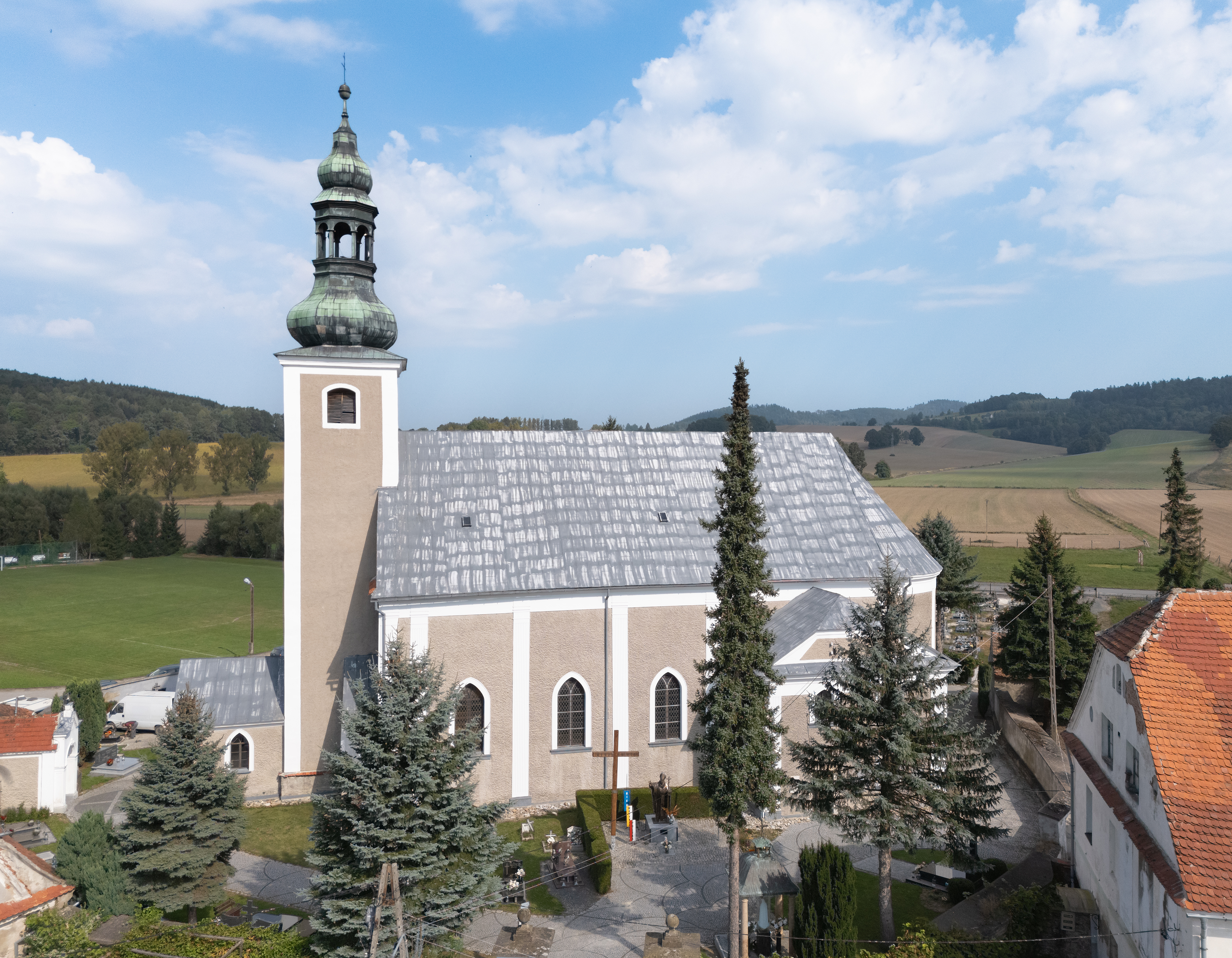
- Church of Saint Andrew

- Location within Poland
- Coordinates: 50°21′N 16°46′E
- Country: Poland
- Voivodeship: Lower Silesian
- County: Kłodzko
- Gmina: Lądek-Zdrój
- Elevation (max.): 400 m (1,300 ft)

Population
  - Total: 1,155

Trzebieszowice ([tʂɛbjɛʂɔˈvit͡sɛ]; German: Kunzendorf an der Biele) is a village in the administrative district of Gmina Lądek-Zdrój, within Kłodzko County, Lower Silesian Voivodeship, in south-western Poland.

== Notable people ==
- Gustav Gunsenheimer, German composer of sacral music
