= Die Versuchung Jesu =

1968 composition by Gustav Gunsenheimer

- Evangelienmotette by Gustav Gunsenheimer
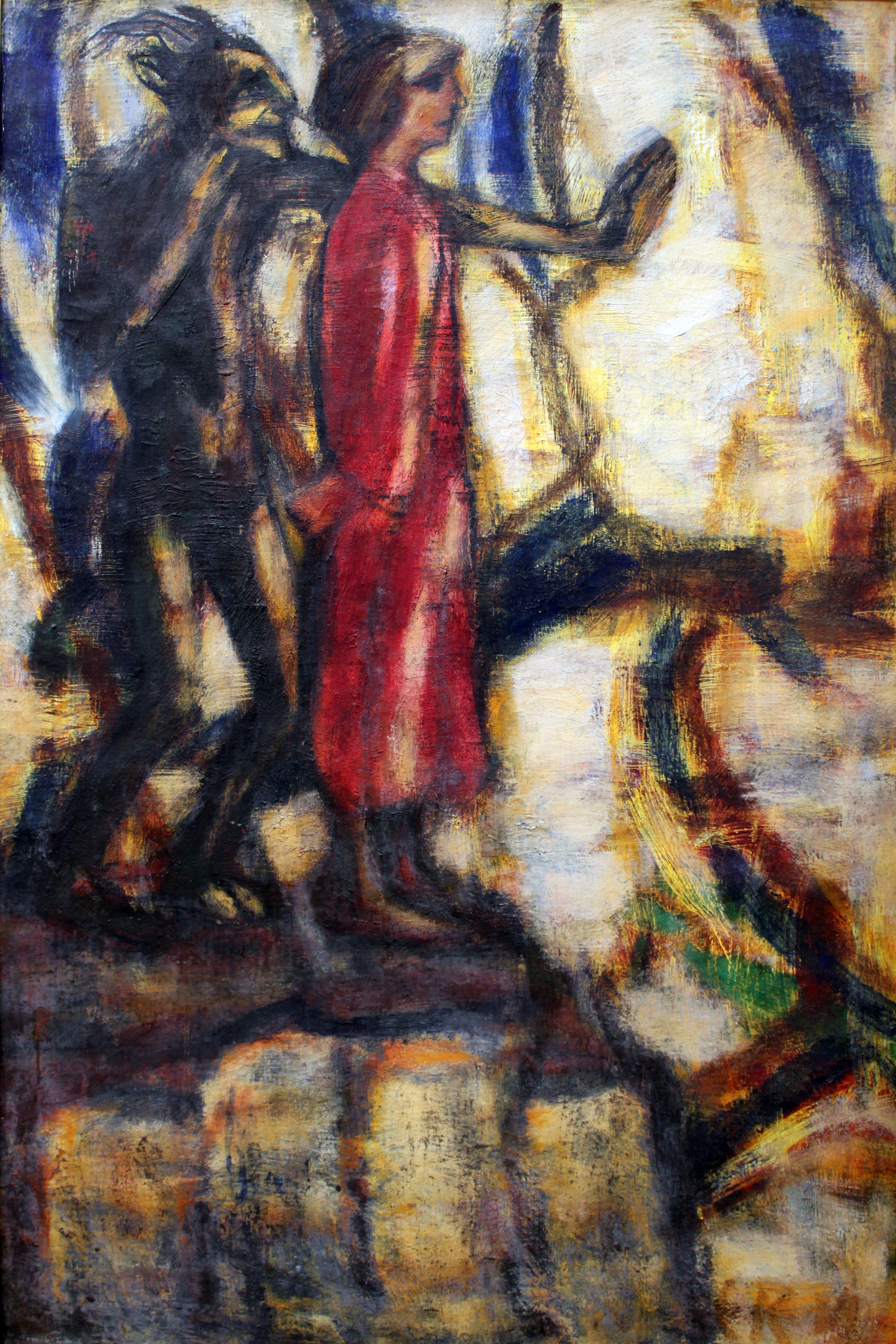
- Versuchung Christi by Christian Rohlfs
- Text: Matthew 4:1–11; "Such, wer da will, ein ander Ziel" by Georg Weissel
- Published: 1968: Stuttgart Carus-Verlag
- Scoring: Mixed choir SSATBB

Die Versuchung Jesu (The temptation of Jesus) is a composition for a mixed choir a cappella by Gustav Gunsenheimer, written in 1968. It is an Evangelienmotette (Gospel motet), based on the gospel in German of the temptation of Christ, written for one of the Sundays of Lent. The text is the biblical passage from the Gospel of Matthew (Matthew 4:1–11), followed by the first stanza from the hymn "Such, wer da will, ein ander Ziel" written by Georg Weissel, in a setting of the original melody by Johann Stobäus. The duration is given as 4 minutes. It was published by Carus-Verlag in 1968. A characteristic feature of the composition is that the part of the devil is rendered spoken, at times in canon.

== Series of motets ==
Gunsenheimer composed a sequence of five motets for Sundays in Lent:

1. Jesus und die zwei Jünger, on the story of Jesus and two disciples (1966)
2. Die Versuchung Jesu (1968)
3. Jesus und die Tochter des Jairus, on the raising of Jairus' daughter (1969)
4. Die Heilung des Blinden, on healing the blind near Jericho (1970)
5. Jesus und das kanaanäische Weib, on Jesus and the Canaanite woman (1971)

He added a motet for a Sunday after Easter: Jesus und der ungläubige Thomas, on the story of the doubting Thomas (1972).

== Composition ==
The structure of the piece follows the biblical narration of the devil leading Jesus into the desert and tempting him three times. The composition is in F-sharp minor in free meter, changing at times without indication from the general 4/4 to 5/4 for reasons of text declamation. No tempo marking is given at the beginning, but relative markings such as "breiter" (broader) appear occasionally. For most of the piece, the sopranos are divided, occasionally also the men's voices to three parts, however never six different parts at the same time.

The composer assigns the part of the narrator to a choir from two to five voices, illustrating different aspects of the text. The part of the devil is spoken, in precise notation of rhythm and dynamic, the second temptation ending with a three-part spoken canon, the third temptation ending with a four-part spoken canon which ends in whispering. The part of Jesus is assigned to the choir singing always in homophony in the manner of recitative, from two to five parts. The part rendering the gospel text ends in D major, the key for the closing chorale in a four-part setting.

Die Versuchung Jesu was recorded by the Dresdner Kreuzchor, conducted by Roderich Kreile, in 1998.
