= Hr-fernsehen =

hr-fernsehen
- Country: Germany
- Broadcast area: Germany, also distributed nationally in: Austria; Switzerland; Liechtenstein; Luxembourg; Netherlands; Belgium
- Network: ARD
- Headquarters: Frankfurt-Dornbusch, Germany

Programming
- Language(s): German
- Picture format: 576i (16:9 SDTV); 720p (HDTV)

Ownership
- Owner: Hessischer Rundfunk

History
- Launched: 5 October 1964; 60 years ago
- Former names: Hessisches Fernsehprogramm (1964–1982); Hessen Drei (1983–1989); Hessen 3 (1990–1996) hessen fernsehen (1997–2004)

Links
- Website: www.hr-fernsehen.de

Availability

Streaming media
- Livestream: Watch Live

hr-fernsehen is the regional television channel of Hessischer Rundfunk for the state of Hesse, Germany.

== Overview ==
The channel focuses on regional reporting. In addition to the afternoon programme hallo hessen and the weeknightly tabloid magazine maintower as well as a compact late edition of the regional news, hessenschau kompakt (both Monday to Friday), the daily hessenschau at 7:30 p.m. has above all consolidated the channel as a permanent institution and the aforementioned programmes have the highest ratings.

Other programmes include the regional political magazine defacto, the panel shows strassenstars and Wer weiss es?, the business and consumer magazine mex and the cultural magazine hauptsache kultur. Currently the most successful format is the Sunday hessenQuiz with Jörg Bombach. Ranking shows are often broadcast in which the "most popular" or "most beautiful" rivers, castles, mountains in or celebrities from Hesse are presented.

From 1990 to 1993, the channel broadcast the weekly talk show Zeil um Zehn and from 1999 to 2004 from Monday to Friday the Late Lounge moderated by Roberto Cappelluti from 10:00 p.m. on.

Further stopped but occasionally successful formats were the two political talk shows 3-2-1 and Vorsicht! Friedman, the first literary programme on German television bücher, bücher, the animal programme herrchen gesucht, the Stadtgespräch and the c't magazine.

== History ==
The third "television programme" of Hessischer Rundfunk was founded on 5 October 1964 under the name Hessisches Fernsehprogramm. Its registered office is in Frankfurt am Main. In the last few decades, the name, logo and appearance of the program have changed several times. Between 1983 and 1997 the programme was called Hessen Drei and from 1997 to 2004 hessen fernsehen. Since 3 October 2004 it has been called hr-fernsehen.

Hessen 3 was the only third programme to broadcast television advertising from January 1985 to December 1992. The proceeds were intended to finance hr's fourth radio station (hr4). Initial revenues of around DM 15 million a year were generated, most recently they amounted to around DM 12 million. In the 1987 Interstate Broadcasting Treaty (Rundfunkstaatsvertrag), however, the states agreed that no more advertising should be broadcast in Hessen 3 as soon as the funds required for hr4 from broadcasting fees were available. In 1988 a passage was included in the HR-law, after which the hr was only allowed to broadcast advertising in Hessen 3 until the end of 1992.

== Distribution ==
Hr-fernsehen began broadcasting in HD on 5 December 2013, however it was broadcast in upscaled format until 26 January 2015. During Easter 2014, the documentary Hessen von oben was broadcast in native HD as a test.

== Logos ==
1997 to 2000

2000 to 2004

2004 to 2015

2015–present

Since 5 December 2013

== Programming ==
=== Entertainment ===
- Wer weiss es? (2009–present)

=== Information ===
- alle wetter! (2001–present)
- hallo hessen (2012–present)
- Hessenschau (1964–present)
- maintower (2001–present)
- Tagesschau

=== Sport ===
- heimspiel! (2005–present)
