= Hr XXL =

hr XXL
- Germany
- Broadcast area: Hesse

Programming
- Language: German

Ownership
- Operator: Hessischer Rundfunk (HR)

History
- First air date: 5 January 1998
- Last air date: 31 December 2003

hr XXL was a German public radio station owned and operated by the Hessischer Rundfunk (HR). It aired a youth-oriented program with a focus on electronic music.

It was replaced by You FM on 1 January 2004.
