= Hr-chronos =

hr-chronos
- Germany
- Broadcast area: Hesse

Programming
- Language: German

Ownership
- Operator: Hessischer Rundfunk (HR)

History
- First air date: 5 January 2001
- Last air date: 30 June 2003

hr-chronos was a German, public radio station owned and operated by the Hessischer Rundfunk (HR).
