= Sackpfeife =

Mountain in Germany

Coordinates: 50°57′N 8°32′E

Highest point
- Elevation: 673.3 m (2,209 ft)

Geography
- Location: Landkreis Waldeck-Frankenberg, Hesse, Germany

Sackpfeife is a mountain of Landkreis Waldeck-Frankenberg, Hesse, Germany.
