= Johann Wanning =

Dutch singer and composer (1537 - 1603)

Johann Wanning (also known as Johannes Wanningus, Wannigk, Wannicke or Wangnick) (1537 – 23 October 1603) was a Dutch composer, kapellmeister and singer who worked for most of his career in the Polish city of Danzig (Gdańsk). He wrote a number of cycles of motets to be performed through the church year, as well as being the composer of the first known musical epithalamium.

== Life ==
Little is known about his early years or education. He was born in Kampen in the then Habsburg Netherlands and went to the university at Königsberg in the Duchy of Prussia in 1560. He sang as an alto in the ducal choir and gained a reputation as a composer. A few years later he moved to the port city of Danzig, where he was appointed to the role of kapellmeister at St. Mary's Church. He held the position until his death in 1603, though his health had progressively deteriorated since 1593; in 1599 the composer Nikolaus Zangius took over Wanning's duties, while Wanning himself was given what amounted to a pension of 50 marks paid quarterly.

== Musical works ==
Wanning is today most noted for being "the first Protestant composer to write cycles of de tempore motets for the whole church year," and his work inspired a number of later composers to create similar cycles of Evangelienmotetten or Spruchmotetten. He composed over 100 motets in Latin, published between 1580 and 1590. They were published in two cycles, the first appearing in two parts published in 1580 and 1584 respectively (and republished in 1590) and the latter published in 1590. The first volume, Sacrae Cantiones quinque, sex, septem et octo voces compositae, et tum vivae voces, tum musicis instrumentis aptatae, contains twenty-seven motets for six voices, for saints' days and festivals. A further fifty-two motets are contained in the second volume, Sententiae insigniores quinque, sex et septem voces ex evangeliis dominicalibus excerptae atque modulis musicis ornatae, for from five to seven voices. They were to be sung on days from the first Sunday in Advent through to the twenty-fifth Sunday after Trinity. They have been described as "lively" by Hans J. Moser, who praises Wanning's expressive power, and Rudolf Eller highlights the motets' solid polyphony, colourful sound, and richness of expression.

Wanning was also the author of the first known musical epithalamium – a poem written for a newlywed bride heading to the marital bedchamber for the first time. It consisted of a two-movement work for six voices, probably composed in the 1580s, though only the manuscripts for the tenor and quinta vox parts have survived. It is thought to have been created as a gift for the bride and groom to whom it is dedicated. The groom's father-in-law was a prominent Danzig theologian and rector of the Church of St. Barbara, and was also a music lover whom Wanning is likely to have known through his contacts with the city's social elite. He may have been composed it as a service to a friend. It may not have been his first venture into wedding music, as some of his motets may also have been intended for this purpose. Seven of the twenty-four works in his Sacrae cantiones of 1580 are settings of texts from the Song of Songs and two of the other motets relate to marriage. One of them, A Domino egressa est res ista, may have been written in connection with the wedding in 1579 of Constantin Ferber and Elisabeth Hacken. Ferber was the youngest son of the then Mayor of Danzig, Wanning's patron.

He wrote a second epithalamium that was published in 1596 for a bride and groom who were married in Leipzig in Saxony. This may have been commissioned by Georg Knoff, the owner of one of the largest collections of music prints in Europe at that time. Wanning had been on a six-year break in creative activity – by then he was suffering persistent health problems – and the epithalamium was the first work published since his final motet collection, Sacrae cantiones quinque et sex voces, was published in Venice in 1590. It was also the only example in his career as a composer of using a German rather than Latin text, in this case an extract from the Wisdom of Sirach. This was probably due to the preferences of the Leipzigers but may also have reflected the increasing preference among composers of wedding music to use German texts.

== List of published works ==
- Sacrae Cantiones quinque, sex, septem et octo voces compositae, et tum vivae voces, tum musicis instrumentis aptatae (Nuremberg: C. Gerlach & J. Montani, 1580)
- Sententiae insigniores quinque, sex et septem voces ex evangeliis dominicalibus excerptae atque modulis musicis ornatae (Dresden: M. Stoeckel, 1584; 2nd edition: Venice: A. Gardano, 1590)
- Sacrae Cantiones quinque, et sex voces accomodatae ad dies festos totius anni praecipuos usitatos in ecclesia (Venice: A. Gardano, 1590)
