= Broadcasting House Dornbusch =

Building in Dornbusch, Frankfurt am Main, Germany

Coordinates: 50°08′08″N 8°40′32″E

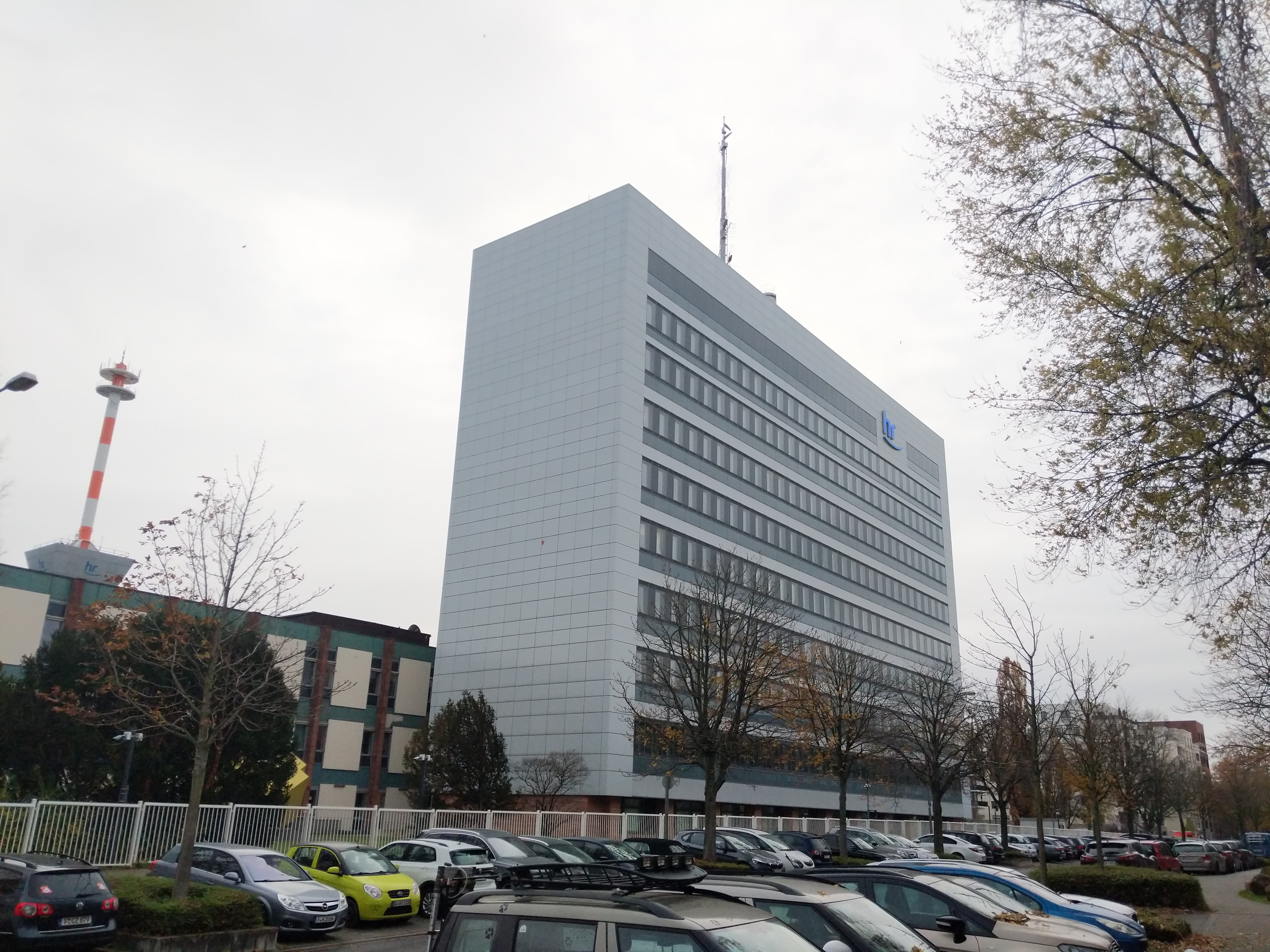
Broadcasting House in Dornbusch (November 2020)

Broadcasting House Dornbusch ("Funkhaus am Dornbusch") is headquarters and main broadcasting facility of the German public broadcaster for the state of Hessen, Hessischer Rundfunk.

== History ==
The site and the building were originally intended as the parliamentary building for German Bundestag. The plans for the round building ("Rundhaus") were developed in 1948 by architect Gerhard Weber. In anticipation for the German capital being moved to Frankfurt, building work had started. However, the parliamentary council voted for Bonn as new seat of government. While the shell of the building had been completed at this point, the plans were changed to re-dedicate the site as new seat for the regional broadcaster. The building was dedicated in 1951 and the move of the broadcaster was completed in 1954.

In 1954, the large broadcasting hall was opened behind it. This radio broadcasting studio has space for 850 people and acts as a rehearsal and recording stage for the Frankfurt Radio Symphony.

== See also ==
- hr-Sendesaal
