= Gerhard Weber (architect) =

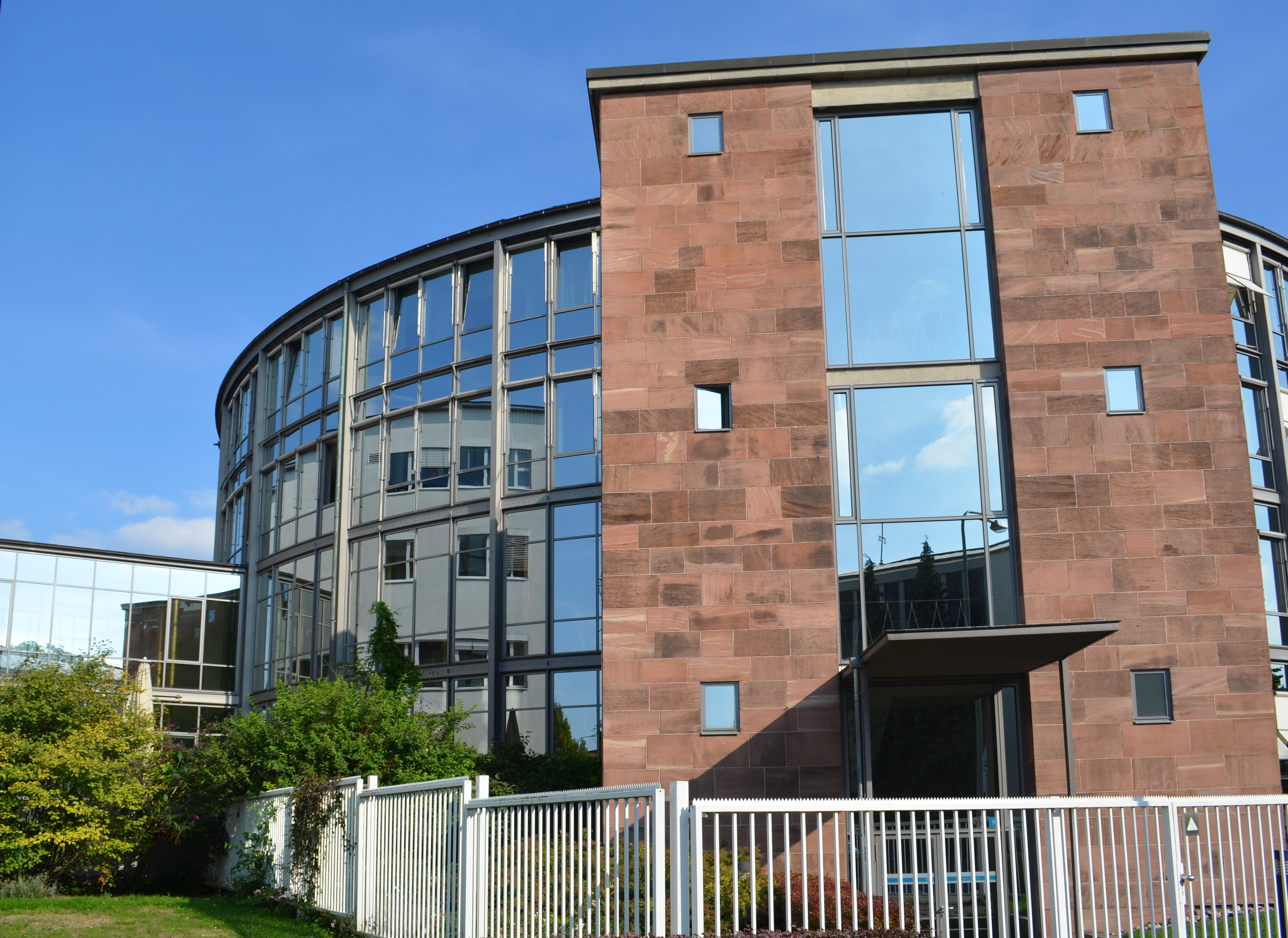
Broadcasting House Dornbusch

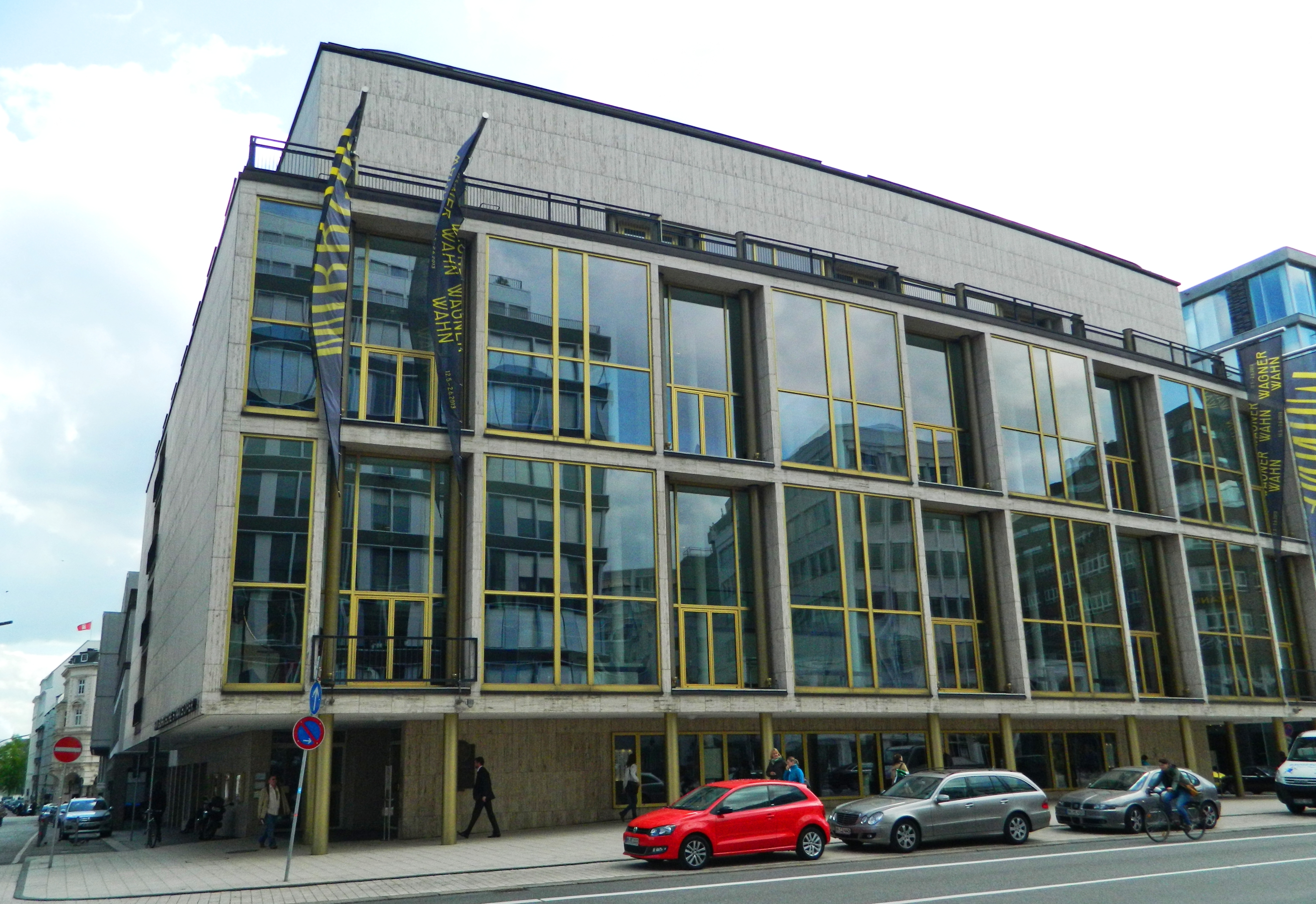
Hamburg State Opera

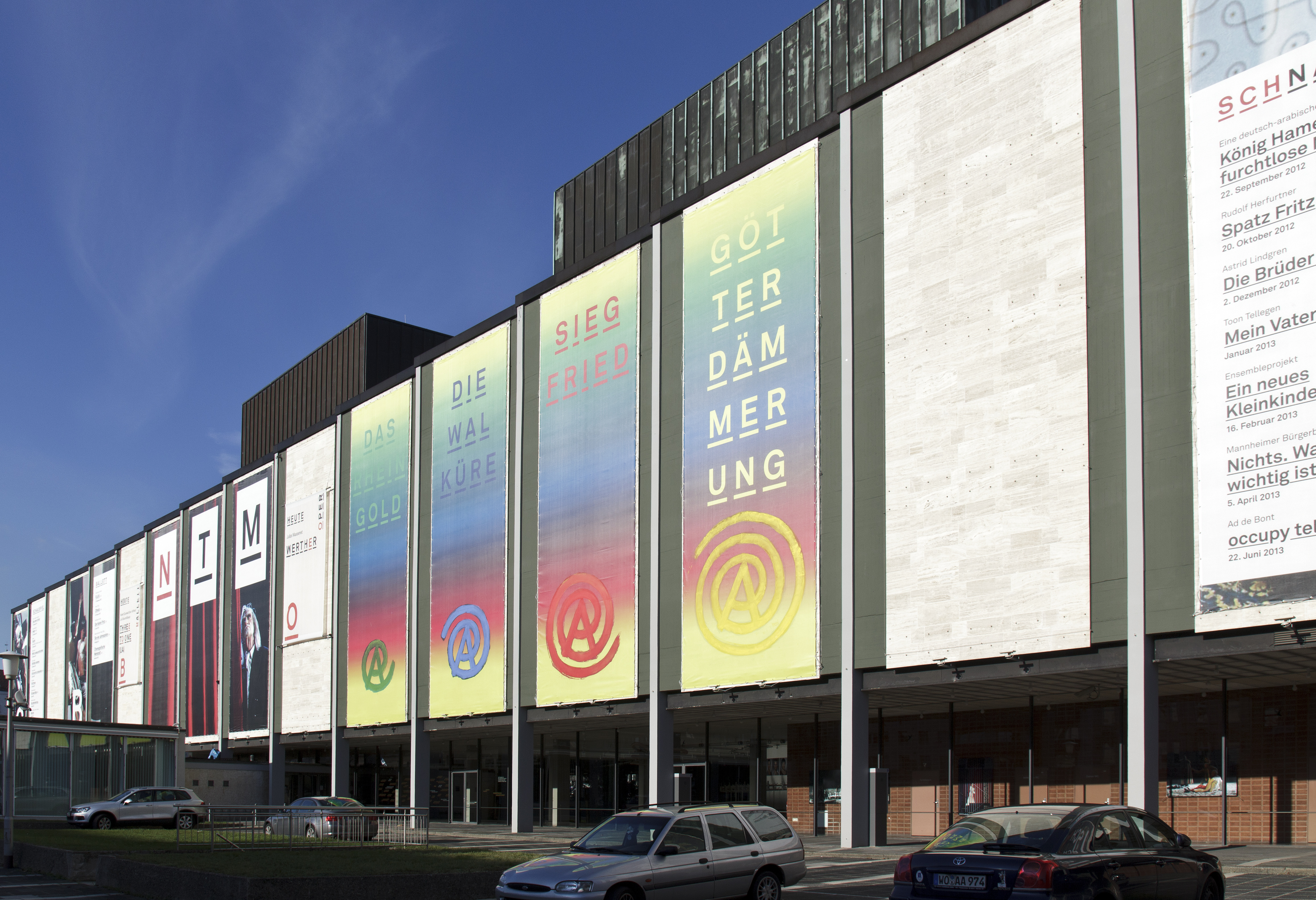
Mannheim National Theatre

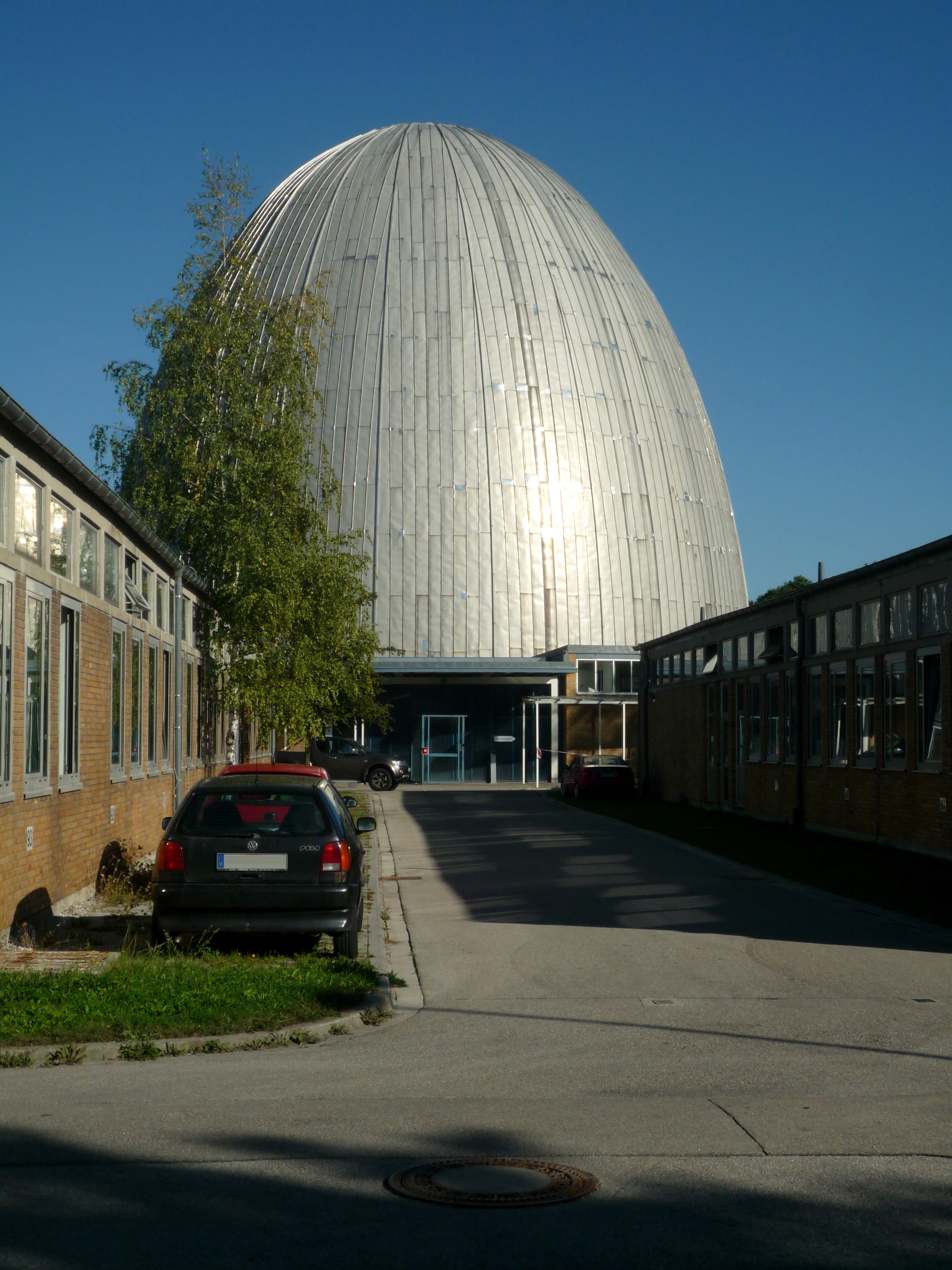
Research reactor in Garching, nicknamed Atomei (atomic egg)

Gerhard Weber (11 June 1909 – 17 March 1986) was a German architect and lecturer. Weber was a student of Mies van der Rohe and is associated with the Bauhaus school.

Weber was born in Mylau. Between 1955 and 1974 he was a professor for architecture at the Technical University of Munich. Considered one of the leading post-war architects in Germany, his architectural estate is today being maintained by the Bauhaus Archive.

At the 1957 São Paulo Art Biennial Weber was awarded the prize as best theatre architect.

He died in Berg.

== Notable works ==
- Broadcasting House Dornbusch
- Hamburg State Opera
- Mannheim National Theatre
- DLF-Funkhaus, Cologne (Broadcasting House of the Deutschlandfunk)
- Market Hall, Frankfurt
- August Thyssen-Hütte headquarters, Duisburg
- Forschungsreaktor München (Research Reactor of the Technical University of Munich, in Garching)
- his private residence "Weber Villa", Allmannshausen (a district of Berg)
