= Main Tower =

Skyscraper in Frankfurt, Germany

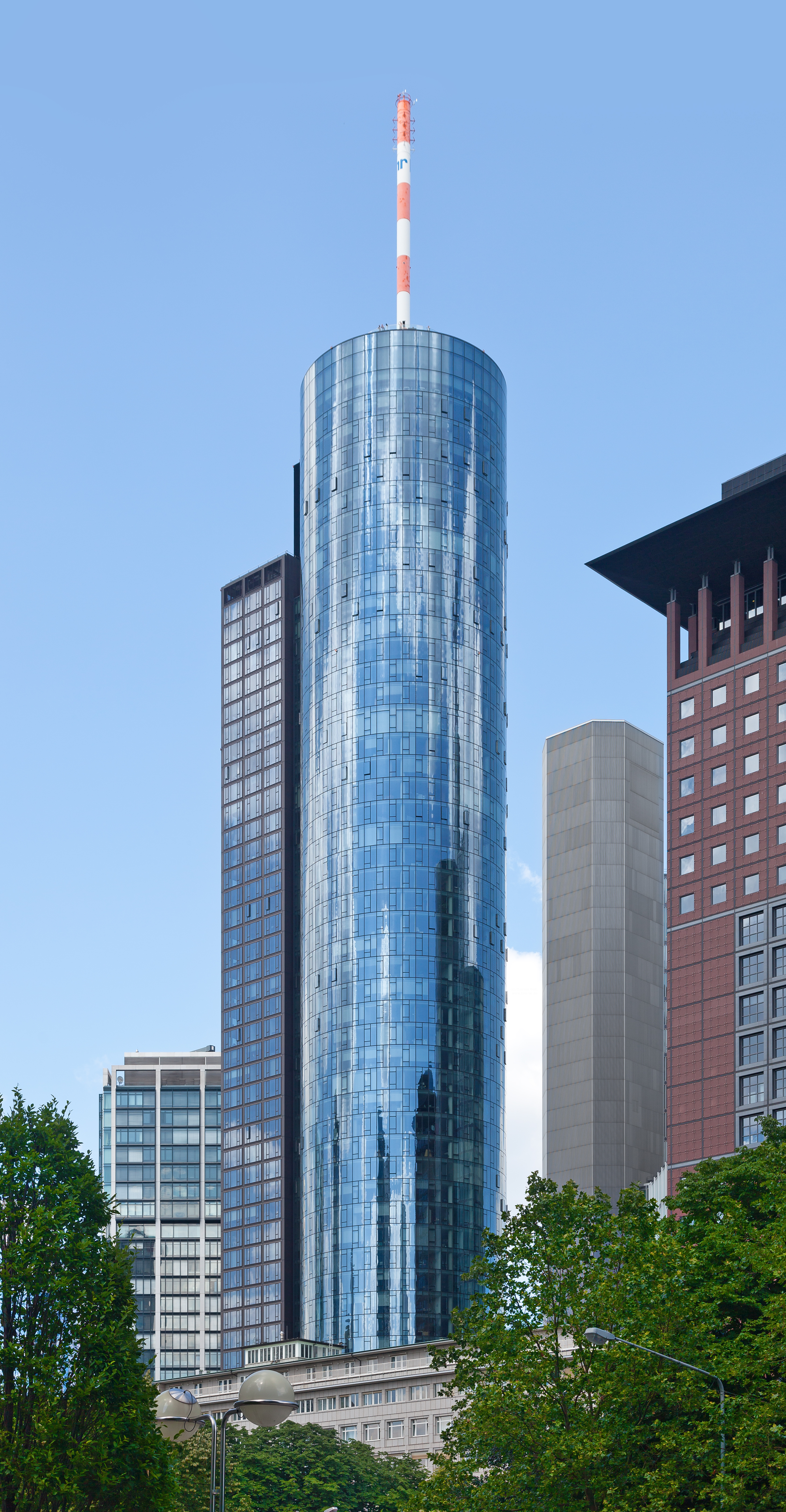
- Interactive map of the Main Tower area

General information
- Type: Commercial offices
- Location: Neue Mainzer Straße 52-58; Frankfurt, Hesse, Germany
- Coordinates: 50°06′44″N 8°40′19″E
- Construction started: 18 October 1996
- Completed: March 1999
- Opening: 28 January 2000
- Cost: 700 million Deutsche Mark

Height
- Antenna spire: 240 m (787 ft)
- Roof: 200 m (656 ft)

Technical details
- Floor count: 56; 5 below ground
- Floor area: 101,705 m^{2} (1,094,700 sq ft)
- Lifts/elevators: 27

Design and construction
- Architect: Schweger + Partner
- Structural engineer: Burggraf, Weichinger + Partner; Förster + Sennewald Ingenieurgesellschaft mbH
- Main contractor: Hochtief; Philipp Holzmann

Other information
- Public transit access: Taunusanlage (10 min)

Main Tower is a 56-storey, 200 m (656 ft) skyscraper in the Innenstadt district of Frankfurt, Germany. It is named after the nearby Main river. The building is 240 m (787 ft) when its antenna spire is included.

The tower has five underground floors and two public viewing platforms. It is the only skyscraper in Frankfurt with a public viewing observatory. As of 2023, it is the fourth-tallest building in Frankfurt and the fourth-tallest in Germany, tied with Tower 185.

The foyer of the building has two art pieces accessible to the public: the video installation by Bill Viola "The World of Appearances" and the wall mosaic by Stephan Huber "Frankfurter Treppe / XX. Jahrhundert" ("Frankfurt's Steps/20th century").

The tower's design features what appears to be two connected towers. The smaller of the two is of a cuboid shape and a design common to 1970s architecture. The second and taller of the two towers is circular with a blue glass exterior which features the transmission tower on top.

== History ==
The structure was built between 1996 and 1999, and serves as headquarters for Landesbank Hessen-Thüringen (Helaba). Other tenants are the German Offices of Merrill Lynch and Standard & Poor's and a television studio of the Hessischer Rundfunk. Prominent US law firms Sullivan & Cromwell and Cleary Gottlieb Steen & Hamilton are also residents of the Main Tower. The first tenants moved in on 5 November 1999, and the official inauguration was 28 January 2000. During weather reports by the television station, the weather reporter stands on the top of the building.

In June 2015, NorthStar Realty Finance of New York entered into an agreement to acquire Main Tower for about €540 million.

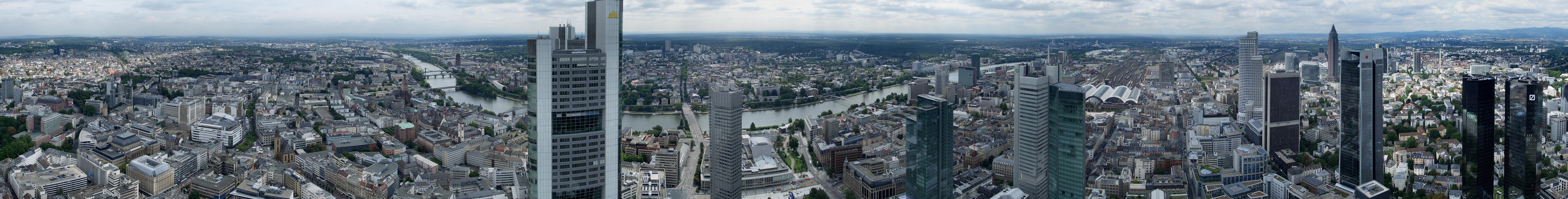
View from Main Tower

== See also ==
- List of tallest buildings in Frankfurt
- List of tallest buildings in Germany
- List of tallest buildings in Europe
