= Hr3 =

hr3
- Deine Hits im Lieblingsmix (Your hits in the favorite mix)
- Germany
- Broadcast area: Hesse

Programming
- Language: German
- Format: Current-based AC

Ownership
- Operator: Hessischer Rundfunk (HR)
- Sister stations: hr1 hr2-kultur hr4 hr-info YOU FM

History
- First air date: 23 April 1972

Links
- Website: Listen Live

hr3 is a German, public radio station owned and operated by the Hessischer Rundfunk (HR). Launched as a traffic radio, hr3 today airs an Adult contemporary format with current hits being mixed with music from the 1980s to 2000s.

As of 2023, hr3 has more than one million daily listeners. Its biggest local competitor is Hit Radio FFH.

== Reception ==
The station is available in Hesse via FM broadcasting and DAB+, and beyond Hesse via DVB-C, DVB-S and livestreaming.
