= You FM (Germany) =

Public radio station in Hesse, Germany

- Hesse; Germany
- Frequencies: See below

Programming
- Language: German
- Format: Contemporary hit radio

Ownership
- Owner: Hessischer Rundfunk
- Sister stations: hr1 hr2-kultur hr3 hr4 hr-info

History
- First air date: 1 January 2004

Links
- Website: Listen live

Former logo, since this logo used the Futura Bold font.

YOU FM is one of the radio networks owned and operated by Hessischer Rundfunk, the public broadcaster for the German state of Hesse. Originally operating under the name hr XXL, the network featured the popular show XXL Clubnights which highlighted the night club scene in Hesse. In January 2004, the network was renamed YOU FM ("Young Fresh Music"), partially in an attempt to divest itself of its old "techno station" image.

YOU FM now offers a more traditional mix of mainstream music and niche talk shows, similar to its sister station hr3, but with a more youthful flavor. It operates a 24-hour format, but from 1:00 to 5:30 AM it broadcasts a computerized music feed.

== Reception ==
YOU FM can be received in most of Hesse via DAB+ and on the following FM frequencies:

- Bensheim 90.2
- Darmstadt 98.2
- Eschwege 106.6
- Frankfurt 90.4
- Fulda 93.6
- Giessen and East Hesse Highlands 97.7
- Gelnhausen 99.4
- Kassel 100.1
- Limburg 90.7
- Marburg 93.9
- Michelstadt 91.0
- Rhine-Neckar 95.3
- Rüdesheim 92.3
- Schlüchtern 88.2
- Wetzlar 105.5
- Wiesbaden 99.7
- Witzenhausen 91.1

You FM can also be received via live streaming, DVB-C and DVB-S.
