= Hr1 =

hr1
- Germany
- Broadcast area: Hesse
- Frequency: see below

Programming
- Language: German
- Format: Classic hits

Ownership
- Operator: Hessischer Rundfunk (HR)
- Sister stations: hr2-kultur hr3 hr4 hr-info YOU FM

History
- First air date: 28 January 1949

Links
- Website: Listen Live

hr1 is the first radio station of the Hessischer Rundfunk.

== History ==
hr1 is the successor of Radio Frankfurt, a radio program run by the American occupation government after World War II. After a formal law was issued, the radio station was transferred to the civil government on 28 January 1949.

Until 2004, hr1 was mainly an information program with news and stories. It was then turned into a general radio station playing music from the 1960s to the 1980s and aiming at an older audience. This program change was met with harsh criticism and caused the number of listeners to drop sharply. Most of the information programs were moved to other radio stations, including hr2 and hr-info.

== Reception ==
hr1 can be received in all of Hesse and neighboring regions on FM and DAB+. It is also present on DVB-C, the Astra 19.2°E satellite (DVB-S), and online via livestreaming.

Frequencies are as follows:

- Bad Hersfeld: 88.9 MHz
- Central Hesse: 91.0 MHz
- Darmstadt and Rhine-Neckar: 90.6 MHz
- Frankfurt am Main and Rhine-Main: 94.4 MHz
- Fulda and East Hesse: 104.8 MHz
- Kassel and North Hesse: 99.0 MHz
- Kassel-City: 94.3 MHz
- Michelstadt: 88.1 MHz
- Wiesbaden: 98.3 MHz
