= Hr2-kultur =

hr2-kultur
- Schön zu hören (Nice to hear)
- Germany
- Broadcast area: Hesse

Programming
- Language: German
- Format: Classical music, Spoken word (culture, current affairs)

Ownership
- Operator: Hessischer Rundfunk (HR)
- Sister stations: hr1 hr3 hr4 hr-info YOU FM

History
- First air date: 15 October 1950

hr2-kultur is a German, public radio station owned and operated by the Hessischer Rundfunk (HR). It airs a cultural format with a high percentage of spoken word and classical music. Hr2 took over some news formats from hr1 after its transition into an oldies format.

The station is commercial-free.

== Reception ==
The station is available in Hesse via FM broadcasting and DAB+, and beyond Hesse via DVB-C, DVB-S and livestreaming. On 11 February 2013, some of hr2-kultur's FM frequencies were taken over by Hr-info and You FM.
