= Hr4 =

hr4
- Einfach gut drauf (Simply feeling good)
- Germany
- Broadcast area: Hesse

Programming
- Language: German
- Format: Schlager music and Oldies

Ownership
- Operator: Hessischer Rundfunk (HR)
- Sister stations: hr1 hr2-kultur hr3 hr-info YOU FM

History
- First air date: 6 October 1986

Technical information
- Transmitter coordinates: 51°18′46″N 9°25′40″E

Links
- Website: hr4.de

hr4 is a German, public radio station owned and operated by the Hessischer Rundfunk (HR). Aimed at listeners aged 50 and above, hr4 mainly plays Schlager music and international Oldies.

== Reception ==
The station is available in Hesse via FM broadcasting and DAB+, and beyond Hesse via DVB-C, DVB-S and livestreaming.
