= Hessischer Rundfunk =

Public broadcaster of the German state of Hesse

Coordinates: 50°08′08″N 8°40′32″E

- Country: Germany
- Headquarters: Frankfurt, Germany
- Area: Hesse
- Key people: Manfred Krupp, Managing Director
- Launch date: 1 April 1924 (SÜWRAG); 2 October 1948 (Hessischer Rundfunk)
- Former names: Südwestdeutsche Rundfunkdienst AG (1924–1933); Reichssender Frankfurt (1934–1945); Radio Frankfurt (1945–1948)
- Official website: hr.de
- Language: German

Hessischer Rundfunk's previous logo, used until 2004

Hessischer Rundfunk (pronounced [ˈhɛsɪʃɐ ˈʁʊntfʊŋk]; "Hesse Broadcasting"), shortened to HR (pronounced [haːˈʔɛʁ]; stylized as hr), is the German state of Hesse's public broadcasting corporation. Headquartered in Frankfurt, it is a member of the national consortium of German public broadcasting corporations, ARD.

== Studios ==
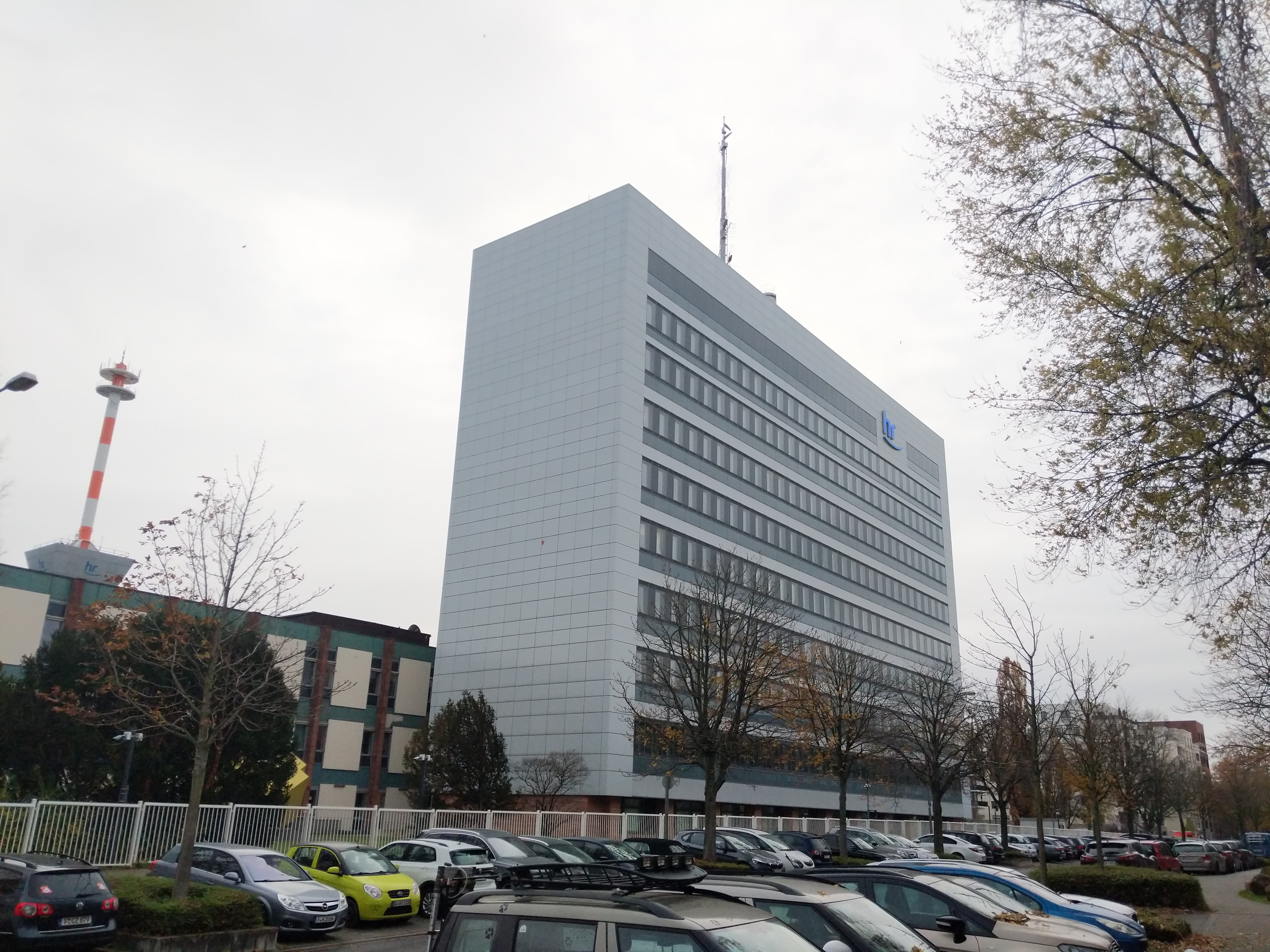
Headquarters in Frankfurt

Dornbusch Broadcasting House, in Bertramstraße, Frankfurt am Main, is home to HR's principal radio and television studios. There are additional radio and television studios in Kassel and Wiesbaden, as well as further radio studios in Darmstadt, Fulda, and Gießen. HR also maintains offices in Eltville, Erbach, Limburg an der Lahn, and Marburg.

In 2000, HR opened studios on the 53rd floor of the Main Tower in Frankfurt city centre.

== Finance ==
Licensing fees are currently €17.50 per month. Since 2013, every household has been liable for this fee, whether or not there are radio or TV receivers present. The fee is collected by Beitragsservice von ARD, ZDF und Deutschlandradio.

== Programming ==
Map of the nine regional broadcasting members of Germany's ARD radio/TV network

=== Television ===
HR contributes to the programming of the main German public-service broadcasting channel Das Erste, and also to that of the associated 3sat, ARTE, KI.KA, and Phoenix.

Like other regional public broadcasting corporations in Germany, HR has its own, regional "channel three" (i.e. in addition to the national ARD and ZDF channels). From 1964 until 1983 this was known as Das Hessisches Fernsehprogramm ("The Hesse Television Programme"). It was then rebaptized as Hessen Drei ("Hesse Three"), before it was rebaptized hessen fernsehen ("Hesse Television") in 1997. Most recently, in October 2004 the channel became hr-fernsehen. Since December 2013 the channel has also been available in HDTV.

Since the 1970s, the station used a film of kittens climbing over a box pyramid featuring its logo with a jazz music background during programming breaks, and created an updated version of the film in 2015.

=== Radio ===
==== hr1 ====
hr1 plays almost exclusively middle of the road and easy listening music, chiefly from the 1965 to 1985 era, and is aimed at a 40- to 60-year-old demographic. Until 2004 hr1 had been HR's main information channel.

==== hr2-kultur ====
hr2-kultur is HR's cultural and classical-music radio channel.

==== hr3 ====
hr3 is an adult-oriented popular music programme. Relaunched in the early 80s as a service targeted principally at young people, the station has aged together with its audience.

==== hr4 ====
hr4 is aimed at an older listenership. It broadcasts regional news and German popular music (schlagers) and "evergreens", as well as instrumental music, folk, and light classical music.

==== hr-iNFO ====
hr-info is a 24-hour news radio. On weekday daytime, it provides rolling news, with bulletins every 20 minutes. At all other times (except overnight), it broadcasts special in-depth-reports on a range of topics, alongside a quick news summary every half-hour.

==== YOU FM ====
YOU FM is HR's music programme for young people. It has also become famous outside of Hesse and Germany for its Saturday night techno music transmissions.

==== Former radio channels ====
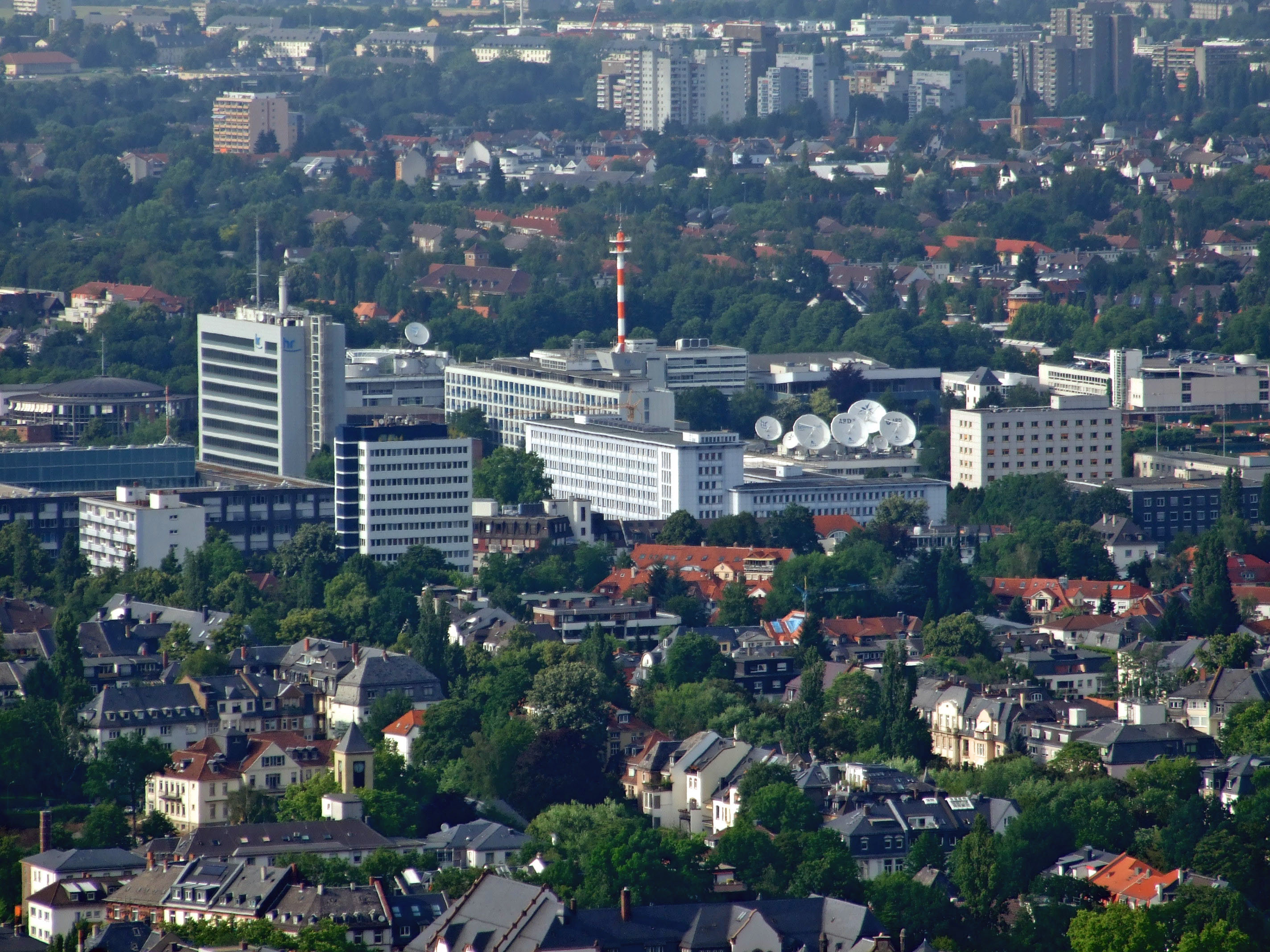
Hessischer Rundfunk with ARD-Sternpunkt in Frankfurt

- hr-klassik – classical music programme (closed September 2005)
- hr XXL – independent music programme for young people (1998–2003, now replaced by YOU FM)
- hr-chronos – information programme (closed 2003)
- hr-skyline – business-oriented information programme (1998–2004), now replaced by hr-info)

== Musical organizations ==
Hessischer Rundfunk maintains three resident ensembles:

- hr-Sinfonieorchester (Frankfurt Radio Symphony) – Founded in 1929 by HR's predecessor, the Südwestdeutsche Rundfunkdienst (1924–33), the orchestra is an internationally renowned ensemble. Its 112 musicians perform the whole spectrum of symphonic music dating from the Baroque era to the present day, initiating various new forms of presentation as well as undertaking experimental projects. Although the orchestra is based in Frankfurt, working principally in the German State of Hesse, it is a frequent guest at important international festivals and regularly tours the world. Since the 2021/2022 season Alain Altinoglu has been the orchestra's chief conductor. Important predecessors have included Dean Dixon, Eliahu Inbal, Dmitri Kitayenko, Hugh Wolff, Paavo Järvi and Andrés Orozco-Estrada.
- hr-Bigband (Frankfurt Radio Big Band) – The Frankfurt Radio Big Band started life in 1946 as the Radio Frankfurt Dance Orchestra. Since the 1970s it has developed into a jazz big band with the focus on concerts. The Frankfurt Radio Big Band plays approximately 50 concerts every year, performing in every possible jazz style as well as crossing over into classic, pop, ethno-, and electronic music. After three years as the band's artist in residence, Jim McNeely assumed the position of chief conductor in 2011.
- hr-Jazzensemble – In 1958 the German All-Stars led by Albert Mangelsdorff became the Jazztett des Hessischen Rundfunks or alternatively the Albert Mangelsdorff Jazztett, then finally the Jazzensemble des Hessischen Rundfunks, today called the hr-Jazzensemble. The initial idea for a steadily working studio jazz band came from Horst Lippmann. With regular studio recording dates but only seldom live appearances and album releases they initially played arrangements by Joki Freund but increasingly original compositions by Heinz Sauer, Günter Lenz, and Ralf Hübner, who all joined in 1961, and in the 1970s also experimented with electronic and computerized sounds and later with sampling techniques. Albert Mangelsdorff, who led the ensemble until his death in 2005, his brother Emil, Freund and Peter Trunk were part of the initial line-up, Bob Degen and Christof Lauer came during the 1970s, all staying over decades. The ensemble could also invite guest musicians especially from the United States like Sonny Rollins, Stan Getz, Jimmy Giuffre, Joe Henderson, Terri Lyne Carrington and Bill Frisell; European guests included Alan Skidmore, Tomasz Stańko, Eberhard Weber, Joachim Kühn, Marc Ducret, Simon Nabatov, and Theodosii Spassov. A retrospective double album that documented their work from 1967 to 1993 was awarded with the Preis der deutschen Schallplattenkritik in 1995.

== Notable programmes ==
- Abendstudio (1948–2003)
- Die Hesselbachs (1949–1967)
- Chippie (1990–1995)

== Notable programme hosts ==
- Peter Frankenfeld
- Bernhard Grzimek
- Hans-Joachim Kulenkampff

== Transmitters ==
- Biedenkopf: FM
- Darmstadt Weiterstadt/Darmbach: FM
- Frankfurt (Funkhaus Bertramstraße): FM
- Frankfurt-Main-Tower: FM
- Großer Feldberg: DAB, DVB-T, FM
- Hardberg am Odenwald: FM
- Hoher Meißner: FM
- Kassel-Wilhelmshöhe: FM
- Marburg: FM
- Rimberg: DAB, DVB-T, FM
- Schlüchtern: FM
- Würzberg: DVB-T, FM

=== Internet streaming ===
Each of HR's six radio channels is streamed online.
