= Alan Bangs =

British-born music journalist, disc jockey and presenter in Germany

Alan John Bangs
- Born: 10 June 1951 (age 75); London, England
- Occupations: Music journalist, disc jockey and radio/television presenter
- Years active: 1975–present

Alan John Bangs (born 10 June 1951 in London) is a British music journalist, disc jockey and presenter on radio and television. He has lived and worked in Germany since the 1970s.

== Life and career ==
Bangs earned a diploma in Communication Studies from the Polytechnic of Central London (PCL), now University of Westminster.

His career began at BFBS Germany, where he presented from 1975 to 1989, first on Sundays, and from about 1981 at Saturday nights in the music programme Night Flight, which didn't fit into any standard drawers. Appropriate to the late broadcasting hours, the show typically included rather quiet pieces by John Fahey or Ry Cooder, but also Kevin Coyne or Neil Young. In the late 1970s, he was one of the first to include interpreters such as Television or Patti Smith. For a short term he hosted a second BFBS programme The Modern Dance (named after Pere Ubu's first LP), in which this new kind of music was given a forum.

Since 1977 he reached greater notoriety as a presenter of the television programme Rockpalast in WDR and the Rockpalast Nacht in the ARD.

In 1984 and 1985, on Mondays he presented the programme Musik Convoy on WDR regional television. He was also active on WDR radio, first on WDR 2, and then on WDR 1 in 1986. There, Bangs presented numerous new records – especially from the independent sector and from the emerging alternative country genre (like Green on Red, Gun Club, Cowboy Junkies, Lucinda Williams), which was rarely found elsewhere in the radio broadcasting landscape. If he liked a record very much, he was not shy to play up to six pieces from the record in a two-hour programme. From the 1980s on in WDR radio, Bangs moderated his Alan Bangs Connection originally on Saturdays, later on Tuesdays.

From the end of 1985, he provided WDR's contribution to the joint ARD night programme ARD-Rocknacht. However, due to its musical content this programme was not taken over by Bayerischer Rundfunk, which met with much criticism. At the end of 1989, when Nachtrock programme for the ARD-Popnacht was being reformed, Bangs did not agree with the new guidelines of this programme; he got out of the ARD night programme and since 1990 returned under the broadcast name Alan Bangs Connection back into the programme of WDR 1.

In April 1995, WDR 1 was reformed to become the "youth wave" 1Live. This was met with vehement criticism. The former daily musical theme programmes broadcast between 22:00 to 00:00 were discontinued without replacement, only Alan Bangs Connection "survived" on a new slot at Sundays from 23:00 to 01:00 under the new title "Nachtflug" in 1995. However, Bangs idea of themed music radio was not compatible with the environment of the new channel: 1Live was a "formatted" channel with a focus on a young target group, but Bangs did not want to exclude any particular musical style from broadcasting. In the 17/18 September 1995 show, he played "Voir un ami pleurer" by Jacques Brel, followed by a short piece of Frédéric Chopin which led to a song by Einstürzende Neubauten. This caused WDR to release him at short notice and almost without comment from all his duties. Alan Bangs no longer won any presentation contracts from WDR afterwards.

Among other things, this was followed by engagements with the broadcasters NDR, Sat.1, VH-1 Deutschland and in particular with live concerts "Ohne Filter" at ARD. Since 2000 he presented the two-hour show "Nachtsession" every fifth Friday of the month (four times in 2012) on Bayern 2. In June 2003 he presented Rockpalast live from Rock am Ring.

From 4 April 2010 Alan Bangs presented the programme Nightflight on DRadio Wissen at Sundays at 23:00. In June 2013, DRadio Wissen announced that it would discontinue the programme in order to develop its music programme "in a different direction". In the corresponding commentary blog of DRadio Wissen this decision was repeatedly criticized by many listeners, but without avail. The last Nightflight show of this series was broadcast on 15 December 2013.

== Presentation style ==
To counter the conventional format radio, Alan Bangs strive for more creativity in programmes:

"I want to listen to people who are interested in certain things and who go through the trouble to find recordings that I might not hear otherwise. Who are playing pieces because they think other people just have to learn about them." [Ich möchte Leute hören, die sich für bestimmte Sachen interessieren, die sich die Mühe machen, Sachen zu finden, die ich vielleicht sonst nicht hören würde. Die Stücke spielen, weil sie meinen, dass andere Menschen sie einfach hören müssen.]

In Alan Bangs Connection, he put up relationships of various kinds between the songs he played (e.g. only cover versions, only unplugged, certain years of publication, certain names or terms in the title, produced only by a specific person etc.). He once played only cover versions of Fever for an entire hour. He was often compared to John Peel for his carefreeness, courage, and open-mindedness. His BFBS broadcast has long been adjacent to John Peel's Music on BFBS. In presentation style, however, Bangs differed substantially from Peel, who made no lengthy comments about the music he played and did not make connections between several pieces or concepts for entire broadcasts.

== Trivia ==
Alan Bang's personal record collection includes over 10000 records. In the mid-1980s, around 3000 records were stolen from his home during a break-in. During a broadcast at BFBS Radio 1 in Cologne, Bangs had previously mentioned that he would go on vacation.

== Radio broadcasts ==
- "Night Flight", BFBS Germany (1975–1989)
- "LP Wochenschau", WDR 2 (1979–1981)
- "Lupenrock", WDR 2 (1982)
- "The Alan Bangs Connection", WDR 2 (1985), WDR 1 (1990–1995)
- "ARD Nachtrock", WDR (1986–1990)
- "Nachtflug", 1Live (1995)
- "Rolling Stone Radio Show", RBB (1996–1998)
- "Nachtsession", BR 2 (2000–2012)
- "Nightflight", DRadio Wissen (2010–2013)

== Television broadcasts ==
- "Rockpalast", WDR
- "Rockpalast Nacht", ARD
- "Full House", NDR
- "Ohne Filter", SWR
- "Jazz Zeit", SWR
- "360 Grad", VH-1 Germany
- "VH-1 1:1", VH-1 Germany

== Publications ==
- Bangs, Alan John (1985). Nightflights - Das Tagebuch eines Dee Jay [Nightflights - The diary of a DJ] (in German). Translated by de Hollanda, Pociao; de Hollanda, Roberto (1 ed.). Düsseldorf, Germany / Vienna, Austria: Econ Verlag GmbH. ISBN 3-430-11145-5. (207+1 pages)

== See also ==
- Peter Rüchel
- Albrecht Metzger
- Karl Lippegaus
