= Axel-Springer-Preis =

- Awarded for: Excellence for young journalists in print, TV, radio, and online journalism
- Country: Germany
- Presented by: Axel-Springer-Akademie
- First award: 1991–present
- Website: www.axel-springer-preis.de

The Axel-Springer-Preis is an annually awarded prize. The Award is given to young journalists in the categories print, TV, radio, and online journalism due to the decisions of the Axel-Springer-Akademie.

== History ==
The prize was awarded for the first time in 1991. It is named after the founder and owner of today's Axel Springer AG, publisher Axel Springer (1912–1985). The award ceremony will take place on his birthday, 2 May, in Berlin annually. Meanwhile, the modalities of the price has been changed and updated. In 1999 no award ceremony took place. Since 2001, an award is presented in four categories: Press, Radio, Television and the Internet.

== Prize money ==
From the prize givers of the Axel-Springer-Akademie, a prize of 54,000 Euro is total awarded. The award comes in the print category with 6000 euros for each best work in three different categories (three 1st prizes). In the remaining three categories of television, radio and the Internet three prizes in each category will be awarded, each with 6000 € (1st prize), 4000 € (2nd prizes) and 2000 € (3rd prices).

As of 2021 the total prize money is 38,000 euros for main prizes in gold, silver, bronze (10,000 euros, 5,000 euros, 3,000 euros), excellence awards "local journalism", "entertainment and humor" and "tech in journalism" (each 5,000 euros) and George Weidenfeld Special Prize (5,000 euros).

== Award criteria ==
Works which were published for the first time in a German-speaking media broadcast by a German-language station or published on the Internet during the previous year can be submitted. The author should not be older than 33 years of age. This limit also applies to co-authors who were significantly involved in the development work. In each category can be submitted per author a work, in the print category one work per author in the three categories.

Contributions should be devoted to "current political, economical, cultural, sporting and social issues."

== Jury and Board of Trustees ==
Jury members were among others Gabor Steingart and Nina Grunenberg (press), Axel Buchholz, Rainer Cabanis and Carmen Thomas (radio), as well as Heinz Klaus Mertes, Gerd Ruge, Steffen Seibert and Maria von Welser (TV). Claus Strunz, Hans-Dieter Degler, Carola Ferstl, Jan-Eric Peters (also printed), Rowan Barnett and Sebastian Turner belonged to the Internet jury.

The Board of Trustees includes, among others, former award winner Mathias Döpfner and Friede Springer.

== Award winners ==
=== 1993–1994 ===
Award winners 1993

- Jürgen Dahlkamp, (Journalist)
- Christian Kracht (Author)
- Ildikó von Kürthy (Author)

Award winners 1994

- Mario Kaiser (Journalist)
- Jörg Schönenborn (WDR-Editor)
- Christoph Scheule (BR-Correspondent)
- Stefan Willeke (Journalist)

=== 1995–2000 ===
Award winners 1995

- Category Press: Stephan Haselberger (Welt am Sonntag); Ulf Poschardt (Süddeutsche Zeitung); Antje Potthoff (Der Spiegel)
- Category Radio: Bernd Diestel (Antenne Bayern); Andrea Oster (1 Live); Katrin Prüfig, Maren Lohmann-Puttfarcken, Thorsten Geil, Marc Thomas Spahl (Radio Hamburg)
- Category Television: Wolfgang Luck; Robert Tasso Pütz (West 3); Ina-Maria Ruck (WDR); Antje Schmidt (ZDF)

Award winners 1996

- Category Press: Heike Faller (Geo Saison); Christoph Reuter (Geo); Dominik Wichmann (Süddeutsche Zeitung)
- Category Radio: Marina Borovik (Hessischer Rundfunk); Marion Neumann (WDR); Katrin Prüfig, Maren Lohmann-Puttfarcken, Thorsten Geil, Marc Thomas Spahl (NDR)
- Category Television: Anja Riediger (MDR); Jutta Schilcher, Claudia Wörner (Bayerisches Fernsehen); Holger Trzeczak (Ostdeutscher Rundfunk Brandenburg)

Award winners 1997

- Category Press: Klaus Brinkbäumer (Der Spiegel); Holger Gertz (Süddeutsche Zeitung); Moritz Rinke (Der Tagesspiegel)
- Category Radio: Alexa Brogli (Radio Z); Dörte Lucht (Radio Brocken); Andreas Otto (Radio ffn)
- Category Television: Verena Egbringhoff (KiKa); Ina-Maria Ruck (WDR); Boris Weber (RTL)

Award winners 1998

- Category Press: Susanne Frömel (Die Welt); Florian Hanig (Merian); Annabel Wahba (Süddeutsche Zeitung)
- Category Radio: Daniel Ernst (Radio Regenbogen); Timo Schnitzer (Berliner Rundfunk 91,4); Sandra Schwarte, Henning Orth (DeutschlandRadio)
- Category Television: Jens Fintelmann, Thomas Seekamp (ARD); Ilka Franzmann (Arte); Gordon Godec (ARD)

Award winners 1999 (not awarded)

Award winners 2000

- Category Press: Ralf Eibl (Die Welt); Marcus Jauer (Süddeutsche Zeitung); Mario Kaiser (Die Zeit)
- Category Radio: Stephan Holzapfel (DeutschlandRadio); Oliver Schubert (Antenne Mecklenburg-Vorpommern); Lutz Wilde (Radio Bremen)
- Category Television: Arne Birkenstock, André Schäfer (ARD); Steffen Schneider (WDR); Marcus Vetter (Südwestfernsehen)

=== 2001–2010 ===
Award winners 2001

- Category Press: Matthias Kalle (Süddeutsche Zeitung); Jana Simon (Der Tagesspiegel); Henning Sußebach (Berliner Zeitung)
- Category Radio: Philip Banse (Deutschlandfunk); Daniela Kahls (MDR Info); Franziska Schiller (DeutschlandRadio)
- Category Television: Maria Blumencron (ZDF); Jana Matthes, Andrea Schramm (WDR); Anja Reschke, Dietmar Schiffermüller (ARD)
- Category Internet: Jutta Heess (3sat); Sybille Klotz (fibrestar); Ute Schönfelder (Radio Bremen)

Award winners 2002

- Category Press: Rico Czerwinski (Der Tagesspiegel); Thomas Hahn (Süddeutsche Zeitung); Bas Kast (Der Tagesspiegel)
- Category Radio: Sofie Johanna Donges (Welle hr3); Stephan Holzapfel (DeutschlandRadio); Marc Weiss (Radio NRW)
- Category Television: Marc Eberle (Arte); Marion Kainz (WDR); Ariane Vuckovic (ZDF)
- Category Internet: Dara Hassanzadeh ZDF; Roman Mischel (onlinejournalismus.de); Alexander Stirn (spiegel.de)

Award winners 2003

- Category Press: Claudia Fromme (Süddeutsche Zeitung); Christine-Felice Röhrs (Der Tagesspiegel); Anne Zielke (Frankfurter Allgemeine Zeitung)
- Category Radio: Tobias Häusler (Radio NRW); Steffen Prell (Radio Multikulti); Michael Watzke (Antenne Bayern)
- Category Television: Jan Hinrik Drevs (NDR); Katharina Gugel, Ulf Eberle (ZDF); Christine Thalmann, Jens Rübsam (SFB1)
- Category Internet: Philipp Müller (ZDF.reporter)

Award winners 2004

- Category Press: Christoph Amend (Der Tagesspiegel); Catrin Barnsteiner (Die Welt); Roland Schulz (Die Zeit)
- Category Radio: Alexander Baltz (Radio Schleswig-Holstein); Frank Kühn (WDR); Dirk Steinmetz (BLR & RadioDienst)
- Category Television: Matthias Frickel (Deutsche Welle); Gunther Hainke (ZDF); Frank Kleemann (ProSieben)
- Category Internet: Carola Padtberg (ZDF); Elise Schirrmacher (WDR); Marcus Schuster (ZDF)

Award winners 2005

- Category Press: Adam Soboczynski (Die Zeit); Mathias Plüss (Weltwoche); Sandra Schulz (mare)
- Category Radio: Ralph Erdenberger (WDR); Jürgen Bangert (Radio NRW); Simone Roßkamp (RBB)
- Category Television: Eric Friedler; Henning Rütten (beide ARD); Sanja Hardinghaus (RTL)
- Category Internet: Sebastian Christ, Manuel J. Hartung, Alexander Krauss, Daniel Opper, Christina Stefanescu, Christian Störmer (Redaktion streitBar.org); Boris Inanici (ARD); Steffen Leidel (Deutsche Welle)

Award winners 2006

- Category Press: Lara Fritzsche (Kölner Stadt-Anzeiger), Steffen Kraft (Süddeutsche Zeitung), Dimitri Ladischensky (mare)
- Category Radio: Julia Zöller (BR), Jochen Hubmacher (SWR), Michael Beisenherz (Radio NRW)
- Category Television: Monika Schäfer (ARD), Ariane Reimers (WDR), Andreas Postel (ZDF)
- Category Internet: Katrin Meyer (ZDF), Christoph Scheuermann (WDR), Helge Bendl/Klaus Kranewitter (Stern)

Award winners 2007

- Category Press: Karsten Kammholz (Berliner Morgenpost), Kai Feldhaus (Bild-Zeitung), Markus Feldenkirchen (Der Spiegel)
- Category Radio: Kilian Kirchgeßner (Deutschlandfunk), Marko Rösseler (WDR 2), Philipp Roggenkamp (NRW)
- Category Television: Juliane Fliegenschmidt, Julia Friedrichs, Eva Müller (ARD), Dirk Laabs (arte), Christian Rohde (NDR)
- Category Internet: Lars Abromeit (geo.de), Florian Güßgen (stern.de), Redaktionsteam jetzt.de (jetzt.de)

Award winners 2008

- Category Press: Axel Lier (Berliner Morgenpost); Julian Reichelt (BILD); Barbara Hardinghaus (Der Spiegel)
- Category Radio: Julia Friese (RBB); Marlis Schaum (WDR 5); Meral Al-Mer (RBB)
- Category Television: Chiara Sambuchi (ZDF); Katharina Wolff (ARD); Benjamin Cantu
- Category Internet: Sebastian Göllner (sport.ard.de); Kathrin Klöpfer und Julia Kiehne (heute.de); Stephanie Lachnit (einslive.de)

Award winners 2009

- Category Press: Jürgen Bock (Stuttgarter Nachrichten), Jan Grossarth (Frankfurter Allgemeine Zeitung), Alice Bota (Die Zeit)
- Category Radio: Anne Allmeling, Elif Senel (WDR 5), Ulrike Jährling (Deutschlandradio Kultur), Christoph Pfaff, Anneli Beyer (delta radio)
- Category Television: Rebecca Gudisch, Tilo Gummel (WDR), Florian Bauer (ARD), Lutz Ackermann, Anita Blasberg, Marian Blasberg (ZDF)
- Category Internet: Sebastian Christ (stern.de), Team 4 der Axel-Springer-Akademie (macht-maschine.de), Patrick Gensing (npd-blog.info)

Award winners 2010

- Category Press: Johannes Bruggaier (Mediengruppe Kreiszeitung), Karen Krüger (Frankfurter Allgemeine Zeitung), Johannes Gernert (Sonntaz)
- Category Radio: Magdalena Bienert (RBB), Sven Preger (WDR), Jörg-R. Schneider (RBB)
- Category Television: Laetitia von Bayer (ZDF Neo), Timo Großpietsch (NDR), Dennis Gastmann, Thomas Hipp, Marco Lange, Matthias Sdun (NDR)
- Category Internet: Volker Denkel, Katharina Wilhelm (hr online), Niklas Schenck (faz.net), Jan Hendrik Hinzel, Simon Kremer, Marc Röhling (Souk-Magazin)
- Special Award 20 Years Fall of the Wall: Marc Baron, Katharina Eißner, Sarah Fenske, Julia Finger, Jennifer Fuhr, Maria Gerber, Judith Innerhofer, Matthias Kluckert, Celine Lauer, Nina Paulsen, Simon Pausch, Karolin Schneider, Thore Schröder, Sophia Seiderer, Kristof Stühm, Sabrina Treisch, Sonja Vukovic, Johannes Wiedemann, Oriana zu Knyphausen (LITTLE BERLIN - Ein Dorf deutscher Geschichte, www.littleberlin.de)
- Special Award 20 Years Fall of the Wall (outstanding contribution): Sabrina Ehrle, Patricio Farrell, Pierre-Christian Fink, Ralf Fischer, Gianna Grün, Julia Hahn, Lena Jakat, Johannes Jolmes, Wolfgang Kerler, David Klaubert, Oskar Piegsa, Carmen Reichert, Jade-Yasmin Tänzler, Insa Winter (zwanzig nach – das Magazin zum Mauerfall)

=== 2011–2020 ===
Award winners 2011

- Category Press: Katrin Blum (Stuttgarter Zeitung); Alard von Kittlitz (Frankfurter Allgemeine Zeitung); Gerald Drißner (Magazin Datum)
- Category Radio: Tina Hüttl (Deutschlandradio); Carolin Courts (WDR 5); Nadine Dietrich (Deutschlandfunk)
- Category Television: Fritz Ofner (3Sat); Anke Humold (NDR); Basil Honegger (SF1)
- Category Internet: Michael Hauri, Felix Zeltner, Maria Marquart/Ole Reißmann

Award winners 2012

- Category Press: Carolin Pirich (Die Zeit); Britta Stuff (Welt am Sonntag); Michael Bee (Berliner Morgenpost)
- Category Radio: Helene Pawlitzki (WDR); Katja Garmasch (1Live); Nora Sevbihiv Sinemillioglu (SWR2)
- Category Television: Marcel Mettelsiefen (SWR); Juliane Möcklinghoff (NDR); Christian Wilk (ZDF)
- Category Internet: Julius Tröger and Annika Bunse (Berliner Morgenpost); Marcel Mettelsiefen and Jonathan Stock (spiegel.de); Anna Jockisch (2470 Media)

Award winners 2013

- Category Press: Oliver Hollenstein (Süddeutsche Zeitung); Daniel Etter (Frankfurter Allgemeine Zeitung); Karin Prummer (Financial Times Deutschland)
- Category Radio: Felicitas Reichold (SWR2); Till Krause (Bayern 2); Anna Mayrhauser (SWR2)
- Category Television: Michael Strompen, Jo Schück (ZDF); Programmvolontäre des WDR (WDR); Roman Lehberger (RTL)
- Category Internet: Amrai Coen und Bernhard Riedmann (Vimeo.com/Spiegel), Team 11 der Axel Springer Akademie (zoom-berlin.com), Georg Eckelsberger, Fabian Lang, Paul Pölzlbauer, Florian Skrabal und Sahel Zarinfard (dossier.at)

Award winners 2014

- Category Press: Amrai Coen (Die Zeit); Veronica Frenzel (Der Tagesspiegel); Christopher Kissmann (Magdeburger Volksstimme)
- Category Radio: Christiane Hawranek, Marco Maurer (B5 Aktuell); Anna Osius (WDR5)
- Category Television: Maryam Bonakdar, Anika Giese (NDR); Eva-Maria Lemke (ZDF); Diana Voigtländer, Nadja Mönch (MDR);
- Category Internet: David Bauer, Amir Mustedanagic, Philipp Loser (tageswoche.ch); Paul Blickle, Christian Groß (zeit.de); Team 13 der Axel Springer Akademie (wahllos.de)

Preisträger 2015

- Category Press: Daniel Gräber (Der Sonntag), Massimo Bognanni (Handelsblatt), Anne Kunze (Die Zeit)
- Category Television: Philipp Grüll (BR), Sarah Judith Hofmann, Jan Bruck (DW), Christin Gottler, Sejla Didic-Pavlic (WDR)
- Category Radio: Mareike Aden (Deutschlandfunk), Manfred Götzke (Deutschlandfunk), Tobias Brodowy (WDR 5)
- Category Internet: Isabelle Buckow, Christian Werner (sueddeutsche.de), Jonathan Sachse, Daniel Drepper, Stefan Wehrmeyer (correctiv.org), Stefanie Fetz, Sammy Khamis (strytv)

Preisträger 2016

- Gold: Bastian Berbner (Die Zeit)
- Silver: Ronja von Rönne (Welt am Sonntag)
- Bronze: Dominik Stawski (stern crime)
- Kategorie Investigative Recherche: Bastian Schlange (Correctiv)
- Kategorie Visualisierung: Paul Ronzheimer (bild.de)

Preisträger 2017

- Gold: Lena Niethammer (Der Tagesspiegel)
- Silver: Tarek Khello & Christian Werner (Fakt)
- Bronze: Hannes Vollmuth (Süddeutsche Zeitung)
- Kategorie Investigative Recherche: Björn Stephan (Süddeutsche Zeitung Magazin)
- Kategorie Visualisierung: Team 20 der Axel Springer Akademie (sachor jetzt!)

Preisträger 2018

- Gold: Barbara Bachmann für "Sex, Lügen und YouTube" (Reportagen, 6. April 2017)
- Silver: Ann-Katrin Müller für "Vater unser" (Der Spiegel, 30. Dezember 2017)
- Bronze: Nora Gantenbrink für "Ein ganzes Leben" (Stern, 17. August 2017)
  Johannes Böhme for "Sorgenkinder" (SZ-Magazin, 7. Juli 2016)
- Kategorie Kreative Umsetzung: Team 22 der Axel Springer Akademie for "Alyom, Syriens Kinder, das Giftgas & wir"
- Kategorie Investigative Recherche: Stefanie Dodt für "Komplizen? VW und die brasilianische Militärdiktatur" (ARD, 24. Juli 2017)
- internationaler Sonderpreis: Ján Kuciak

Preisträger 2019

- Gold: Anna Feist für "Menschenschmuggler – Das Geschäft mit den Flüchtlingen" (ZDFinfo, 24. August 2018)
- Silver: Paul Middelhoff für "Was ist aus euch geworden?" (Die Zeit, Nr. 31/2018, 26. Juli 2018, S. 8–9)
- Bronze: Elisa Britzelmeier für "Der tote Junge im Baum" (Süddeutsche Zeitung, 2. Juli 2018)
- Category Entertainment and Humor: Daniel Sprenger für mehrere Beiträge in der Rubrik "Realer Irrsinn" in Extra 3 (NDR)
- Kategorie Kreative Umsetzung: Christina Metallinos, Helene Reiner, Tobias Schiessl, Sophie von der Tann und Ann-Kathrin Wetter für "Die News-WG" (Bayerischer Rundfunk auf Instagram)

Preisträger 2020

- Gold: Miguel Helm für "Sie ist 13, er 52" (Die Zeit Dossier, Nr. 27/2019, 27. Juni 2019, S. 13–15)
- Silver: Alexandra Rojkov für "202499" (Süddeutsche Zeitung Magazin, Nr. 35/2019, 29. August 2019, S. 8–15)
- Bronze: Jonas Breng für "Doktor Gammel holt ein Kind" (stern Extra. Zeit für Helden. 01/2019. S. 34–49)
- Category Entertainment and Humor: Esra Karakaya für Karakaya Talk (YouTube-Talkshow von Funk)
- Category Local Journalism: Jörn Zahlmann für Beitragsserie "Zeitsprung" der Elbe-Jeetzel-Zeitung
- George Weidenfeld Special Prize: Manisha Ganguly für den Einsatz von Open-Source-Technologien im Investigativjournalismus

=== 2021–2030 ===
Award winners 2021

- Gold: Alina Schulz (Y-Kollektiv)
- Silver: Erica Zingher (Die Tageszeitung)
- Bronze: Björn Stephan (Süddeutsche Zeitung Magazin)
- Category Entertainment and Humor: team of Juliane Wieler, Friederike Schicht and Daniela Woytewicz (WDR and MDR)
- Category Digital Implementation: Sebastian Koch (Mannheimer Morgen)
- Category Local Journalism: Henning Rasche (Rheinische Post)
- George Weidenfeld Special Prize: Katsyaryna Andreeva and Darya Chultsova (Belsat TV)

Award winners 2022

- Gold: Lucas Stratmann, Katharina Schiele
- Silver: Amonte Schröder-Jürss
- Bronze: Nora Voit, Maria Christoph
- Category Entertainment and Humor: André Dér-Hörmeyer, Benedikt Dietsch, Simon Garschhammer, Janne Knödler
- Category Local Journalism: Anna Westkämper, Paul Gross
- George Weidenfeld Special Prize: Alla Koshlyak

== Literature ==
- Axel-Springer-Preis. In: Programmbericht zur Lage und Entwicklung des Fernsehens in Deutschland., Arbeitsgemeinschaft der Landesmedienanstalten in der Bundesrepublik Deutschland, Ullstein, 1997
