= Presseclub =

German television program

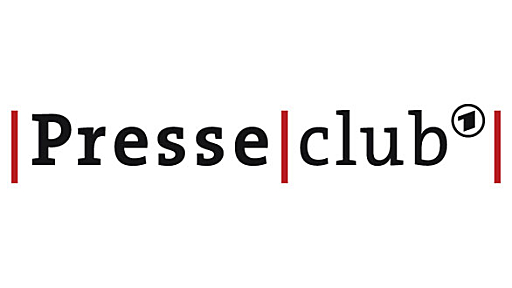
- Logo
- Genre: Information show
- Countries of origin: West Germany (1987-1990); Germany (1990-present)
- Original language: German
- No. of episodes: 150

Production
- Running time: 42 minutes

Original release
- Release: December 27, 1987

Presseclub is a current affairs TV program broadcast weekly on Sunday from 12:03 to 12:45 on Das Erste, Phoenix, and WDR 5 (audio portion).

== Content ==
In Presseclub, four to five journalists discuss current topics. In contrast to its predecessor show, Presseclub is more related to topics in Germany; foreign journalists are rarely invited. The audience then has 15 minutes to ask questions by telephone. This interactive part of the show called Presseclub Nachgefragt ("Presseclub Asked") is only aired on Phoenix and WDR 5. The program is generally characterized by a calm, conversational atmosphere.

== History ==
Presseclub was first aired on December 27, 1987 on Das Erste.

On November 12, 1989, Presseclub was broadcast live from East Berlin on the subject of the topic DDR – Land zwischen Aufbruch und Umbruch ("GDR - Land between New Beginnings and Upheaval"), making it the first West German television program from the GDR.

Since October 2002, if Presseclub on Das Erste is canceled due to a direct sports broadcast, a new edition of the international morning pint has been running every Sunday afternoon on Phoenix under the direction of various Phoenix moderators.

A total of 150 Presseclub episodes were produced, 141 of which include the Presseclub Nachgefragt part.

== Moderation ==
The moderators were/are:

- 1987–1988: Rolf Schmidt-Holtz
- 1988–1993: Dieter Thoma
- 1988–2001: Gerhard Fuchs (successor of Schmidt-Holtz)
- 1993–late 2006: Fritz Pleitgen (successor of Thoma)
- 2001–October 14, 2007: Peter Voß (successor of Fuchs)
- 2005–2013 Monika Piel (Nachfolgerin von Pleitgen)
- since September 2007- May 2022: Volker Herres (successor of Voß)
- since 2008: Jörg Schönenborn
- 2008–2016: Tina Hassel (representative)
- 2012–2019: Sonia Seymour Mikich (representative)
- since 2018: Ellen Ehni (successor of Mikich)
- since July 2020: Sabine Scholt
- since 2023: Susan Link
