= Annika Begiebing =

German television presenter, voice actor, news presenter and radio host

Annika Begiebing (née Wichmann; born November 1, 1981, in Hildesheim, Germany) is a German television presenter and voice actress.

== Life and career ==
Begiebing completed her high school diploma at the Michelsenschule in Hildesheim in 2001. She then did a traineeship at the radio station Radio Mainwelle in Bayreuth. She moderated a daily magazine show and also worked as a news anchor.

Since 2001, Begiebing has worked as a speaker for radio and television. She also took part in radio plays and read audiobooks.

From August 25, 2008, Begiebing presented the Lokalzeit from Düsseldorf on WDR television, as well as the program daheim + unterwegs.

== Personal life ==
Begiebing is married and has a son and a daughter.

== Television appearances ==
=== Moderation ===
- 2004–2007: 1LIVE (WDR)
- 2008-2015: Lokalzeit Düsseldorf (WDR)
- 2008-2017: Daheim + unterwegs (WDR)
- since 2018: Life – Menschen, Momente, Geschichten (RTL)

=== Guest appearances ===
- since 2018: Die 10... / Die 25... (RTL)
