= Susan Link =

German journalist

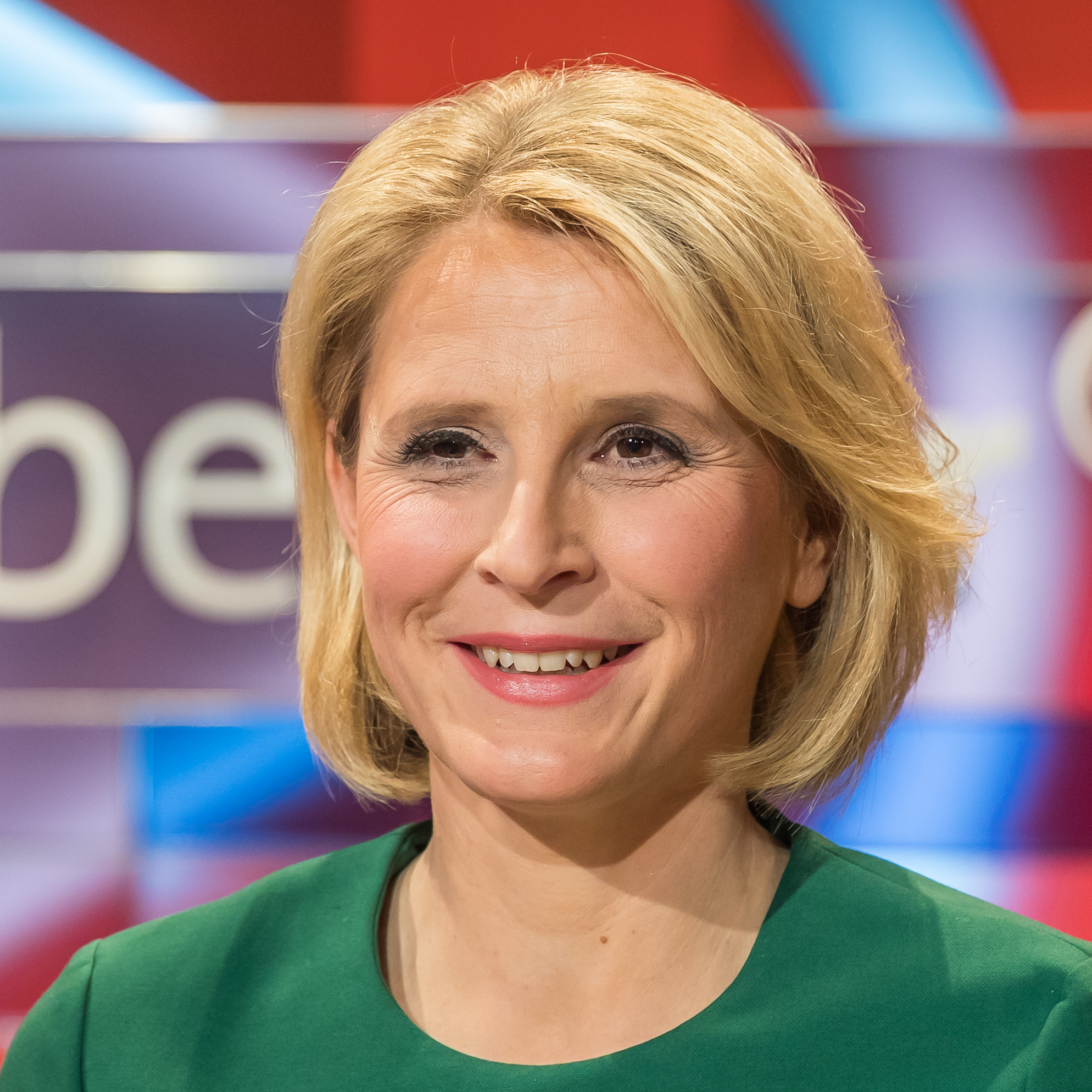
Susan Link (2020)

Susan Link (born 19 November 1976, in Pößneck) is a German journalist.

== Life ==
Link studied the German language at University of Wuppertal. Since 1998 she worked for German radio station Radio Wuppertal in North Rhine-Westphalia. From 2002 to 2011 she worked for German radio network Radio NRW. In 2011 she left to host German breakfast television programme ARD Morgenmagazin.

Link works for German broadcaster ARD. Since January 2017 to 2019 she was a regular host on the talk show Riverboat for MDR with Kim Fisher. Since July 2017 she has co-hosted Kölner Treff with Micky Beisenherz for WDR. Since 2023 she is part of the presenting team of Presseclub together with Jörg Schönenborn and Ellen Ehni.

Link is married and has one son. She lives with her family in Cologne.
