= Ellen Ehni =

German journalist

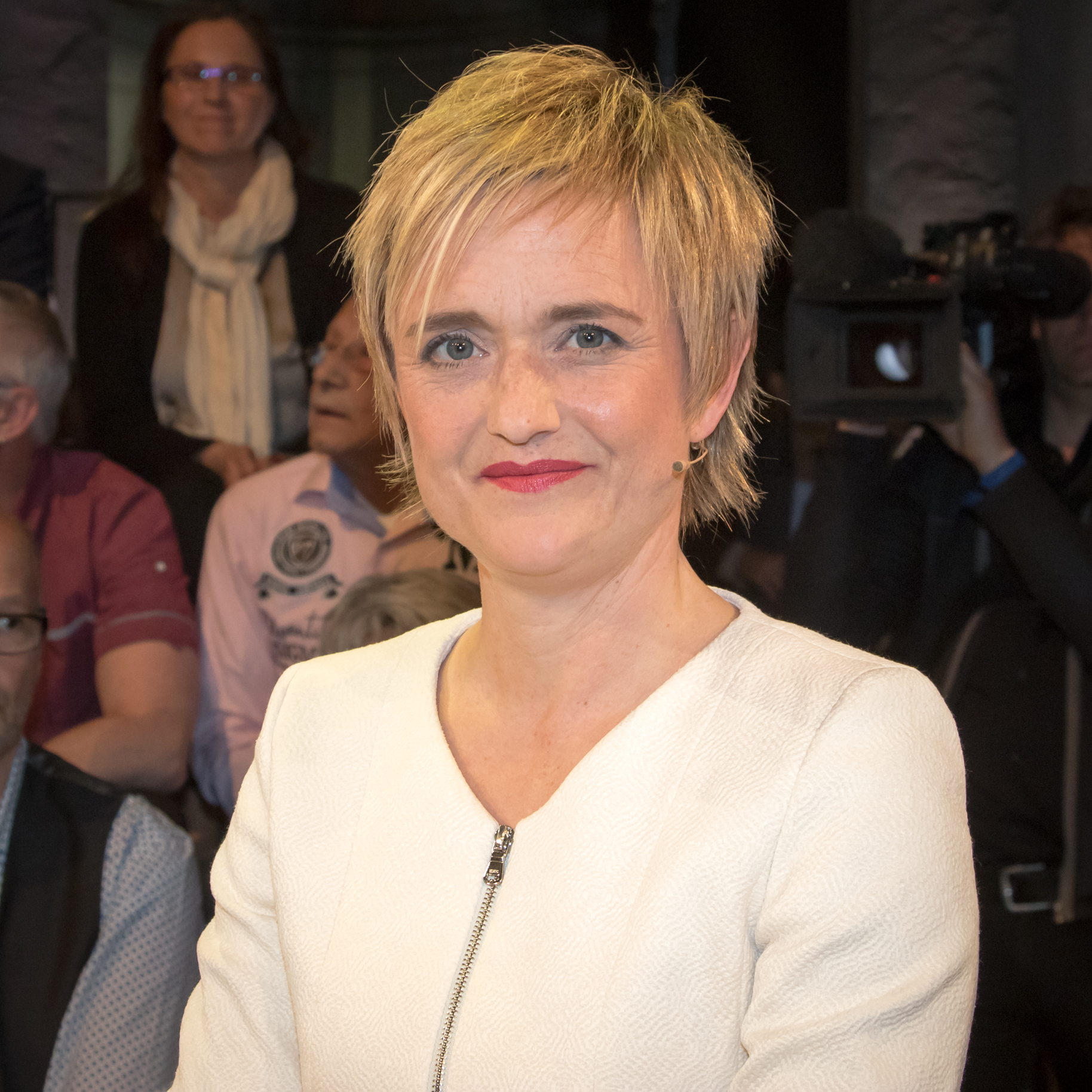
- Ehni in 2017
- Born: 1973 (age 52–53); Heidelberg, West Germany
- Occupation: Journalist

Ellen Ehni (born 1973 in Heidelberg) is a German journalist. At Westdeutscher Rundfunk (WDR) she heads the programme group for business and law.

== Life and career ==
Ehni studied German and French law at the University of Cologne, University of Paris and Humboldt University in Berlin, where she passed her legal state examination. After an internship at Norddeutscher Rundfunk (NDR), she worked there as a journalist. She was an editor at NDR aktuell and reporter for the news programmes Tagesschau and Tagesthemen.

Ehni joined the WDR in 2004 as editor of the programme group "Economy and Law" and worked for the programmes Markt, Plusminus and ARD Ratgeber Recht. She also hosted the last-mentioned as well as, as representative, the ARD-Morgenmagazin. In 2007, she moved to the ARD studio in Paris for five years as an ARD correspondent. She has been in charge of the programme group Economy and Law since 2012. She continues to work as a presenter, among other things for the DeutschlandTrend in the Tagesthemen and for editions of the ARD Brennpunkt as well as the programme Plusminus. From 2018 on she has also been talk show host for the WDR sunday miday show Presseclub (in turn with two others).

On September 1, 2018, Ellen Ehni took over as editor-in-chief of the television department and head of the programme area Politics and Current Affairs of Westdeutscher Rundfunk (WDR).

Ehni is one of three hosts of Presseclub program at on Das Erste, Phoenix, and WDR 5 Radio station (audio portion).
