= Ohne Filter =

Ohne Filter (translation: "No Filter") was a long-running music program on German television. The producer was Michael Au.

It was a 45-minute live television program, broadcast by German public TV station SWF featuring international pop and rock groups. In contrast to Rockpalast (WDR), which was broadcast from larger venues such as the Grugahalle, Ohne Filter was produced at the more intimate setting of a regular TV studio. By the end of 1983, it had become one of the most popular German television music programs. Around 300 episodes were produced, including performances by Chaka Khan, Joe Cocker, and Deep Purple, to name but a few.
