= Ann-Katrin Müller =

German journalist

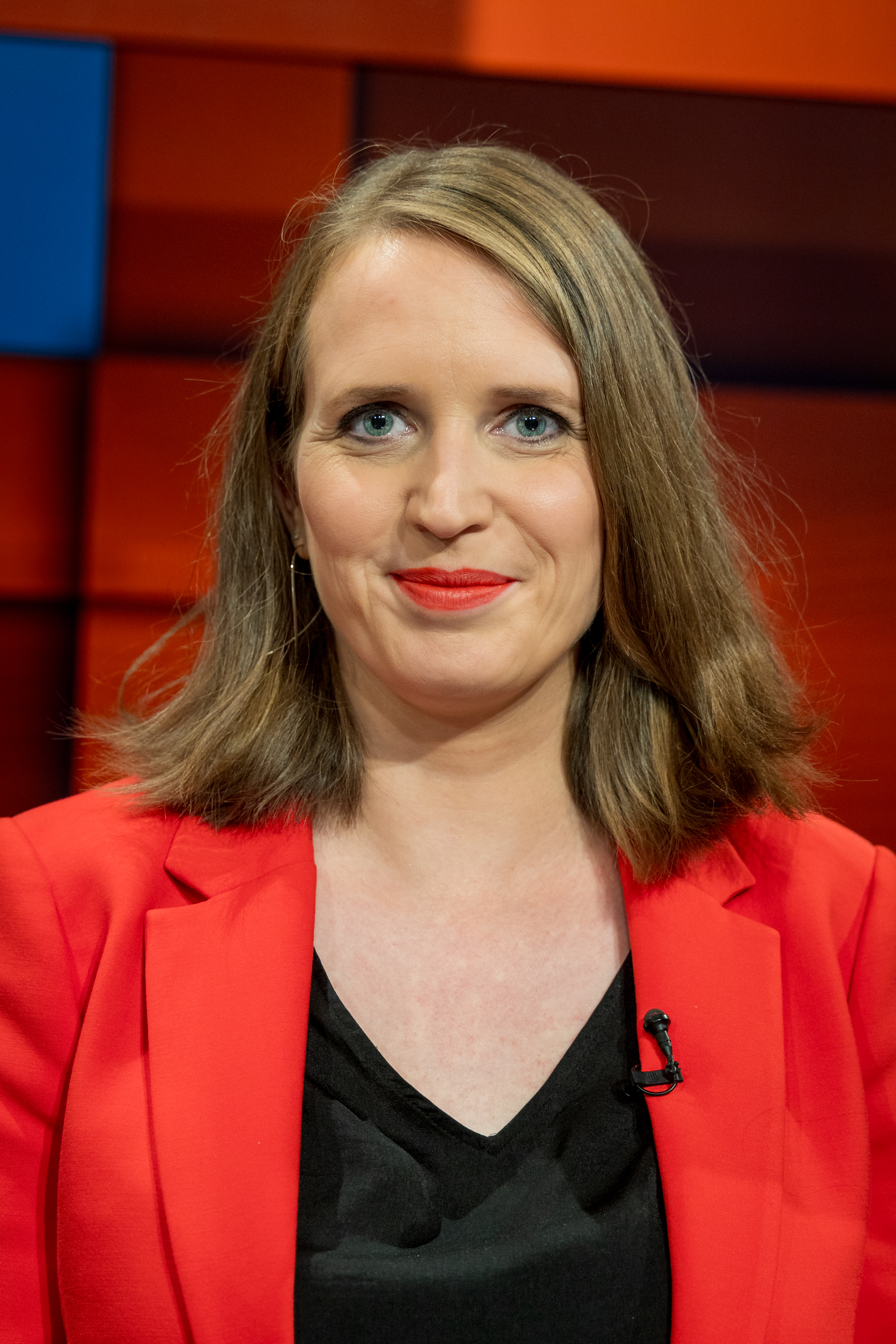
- Müller in 2023
- Born: 1987 (age 38–39); Bonn, West Germany
- Education: University of Bonn
- Occupations: Political editor, Der Spiegel
- Awards: Axel-Springer-Preis, 2018

Ann-Katrin Müller (born 1987) is a German journalist, and the political editor of Der Spiegel. She received an AxelSpringer Prize in Silver in 2018.

== Early life and education ==
Müller was born in 1987 in the Rhineland region. She studied political science and European studies in Bonn and London.

== Career ==
Müller's career started as an intern at the ARD talkshow Hart aber fair (English: Hard But Fair). Later, she worked for public television stations Phoenix, DAPD News Agency, Financial Times Deutschland and public broadcaster WDR Fernsehen.

Since 2013, Müller has been the political editor at the Berlin office of Der Spiegel. She is a researcher on the right-wing Alternative for Germany (AfD) party and political disinformation. In addition, she has done extensive research on the topic of sexual violence, also in the context of elite sports.

In 2018, Müller was awarded the Silver Axel-Springer-Prize for her report on two men recalling their stories of being placed under the care of pedophiles while in the Berlin foster care system. The jury, including Moritz Müller-Wirth of Die Zeit, praised Ann-Katrin Müller for the sensitivity and "sober clarity" (nüchterne Klarheit) with which she covered the scandal.
