= WDR 2 Klassik =

- Germany
- Broadcast area: North Rhine-Westphalia: DAB; Europe: DVB-S; Worldwide: Internet

Programming
- Language: German
- Format: Classical music, information

Ownership
- Operator: Westdeutscher Rundfunk (WDR)

History
- First air date: 30 January 1997
- Last air date: 28 May 2009

WDR 2 Klassik was a German, digital-only public radio station owned and operated by the Westdeutscher Rundfunk (WDR). It used to broadcast the programme of WDR 2, with the contemporary pop/rock music being replaced with classical music.

It was replaced by KiRaKa on digital platforms on 29 May 2009.
