= Albrecht Metzger =

German music journalist, actor, presenter, director, and comedian

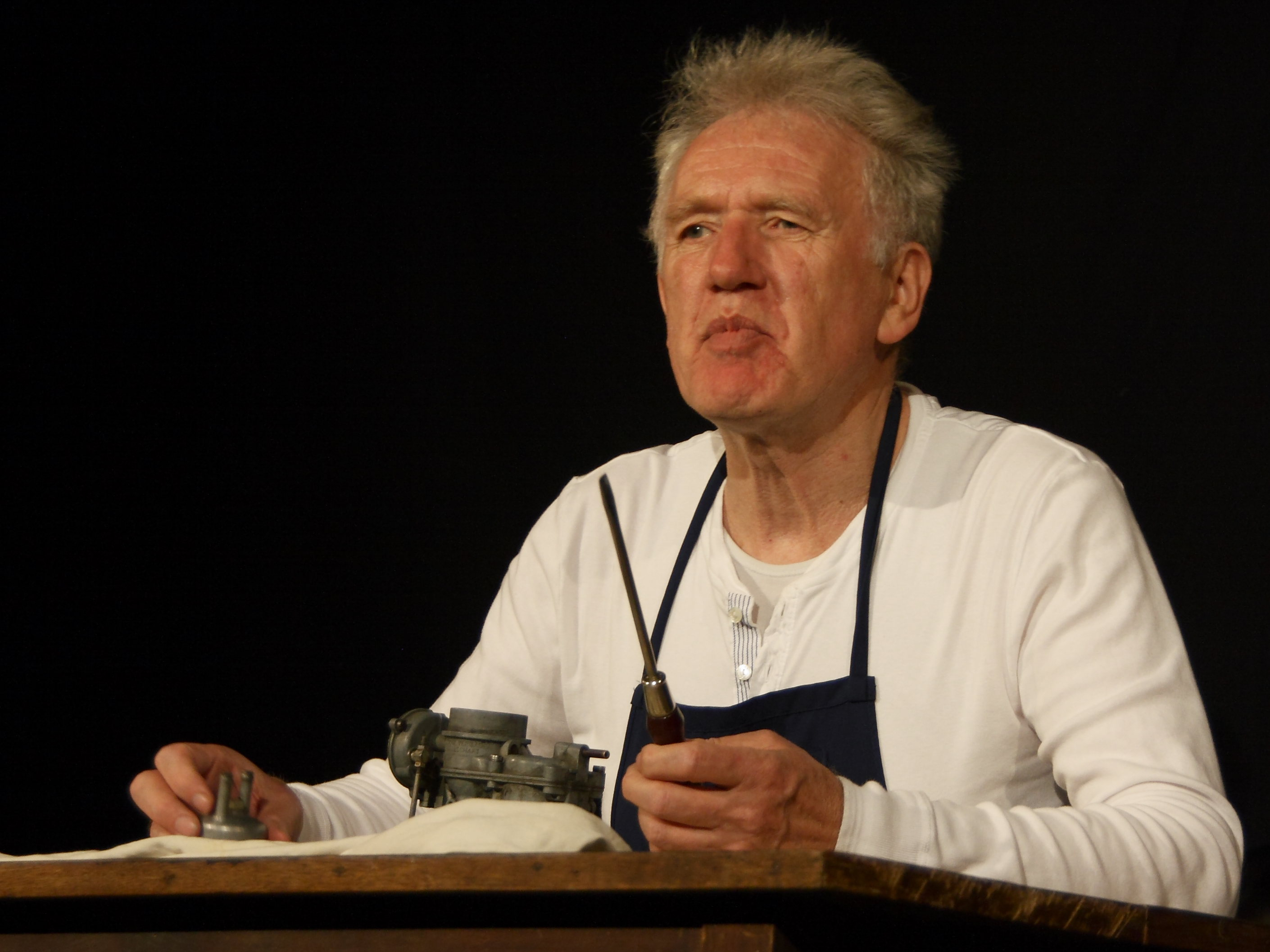
Albrecht Metzger as comedian of the Schwabenoffensive in Komm Du bloß hoim! Reloaded in Kult, Niederstetten, 16 November 2012

Albrecht Metzger (born 1945 in Unteraichen near Stuttgart) is a German journalist, actor, television presenter, film director and cabaretist.

== Life and career ==
Albrecht Metzger was editor of the SDR youth program Jour Fix and moderator of Diskuss and Teamwörk in the 1970s before he became known to a broader public through the rock music program Rockpalast of the WDR. From 1974 he was the first presenter of the studio broadcasts. Together with Alan Bangs he was the presenter of the long Rockpalast Nacht events, in which he presented the bands with the famous announcement "German television proudly presents – Liebe Freunde, heute bei uns zu Gast live im Rockpalast: …".

In 1977, Metzger moved from Stuttgart to West Berlin and until 1982 played the social worker Rocky in the play Mensch ich lieb dich doch in the children's and youth theatre Rote Grütze.

As author and director, Metzger shot more than 40 documentary films for the ARD.

As a cabaret artist, Metzger founded the Schwabenoffensive Berlin in Berlin in 1988. He toured Germany's cabarets with his solo programme Spätzle liebt Bulette.

On every first of the month he moderates the rock music vinyl show Knistern und Rauschen on the internet radio silverdisc.de.

== See also ==
- Peter Rüchel
