= Beisenherz =

Beisenherz is a surname. Notable people with the surname include:

- Heinrich Beisenherz (1891–1977), German art director and painter
- Micky Beisenherz (b. 1977), German television moderator and writer.
- Rie Beisenherz (1901–1992), Dutch swimmer
