= Peter Rüchel =

German music journalist, producer, and founder of Rockpalast (1937–2019)

- Born: 9 March 1937; Berlin, Germany
- Died: 20 February 2019 (aged 81); Leverkusen-Wiesdorf, Germany
- Burial place: Berlin-Dahlem, Germany

Peter Rüchel (9 March 1937 – 20 February 2019) was a German music journalist, producer and founder of the WDR show Rockpalast, which since the mid-1970s has been hosting concerts by national and international bands and solo artists and broadcast them on German and European television.

== Life and career ==
Rüchel was born in Berlin in 1937 as the son of a violinist (the father was head of a musical quartet before the war) and a teacher. He grew up in West Berlin and attended a humanities-oriented gymnasium with subjects such as Latin, Greek, classical music, literature and theatre.

At age 16, he was an exchange student for a year in Minneapolis, Minnesota.

After graduating he studied German studies and philosophy. In 1968 he applied to Sender Freies Berlin (SFB). Until 1970, Rüchel worked there on the programme SF Beat. A little later, the young editor was discovered by ZDF. In 1970 they brought him for their first real youth programme direkt. In 1974, at a television awards ceremony for direkt, Peter Rüchel met Hans-Geert Falkenberg, the then-head of the WDR cultural department. A short time later Rüchel took over the position as the new head of the WDR youth programme. In Cologne, Peter Rüchel met Christian Wagner, then still a student of Filmhochschule München, with whom he collaborated in the following years and who made him familiar with the world of rock music.

Together, Wagner and Rüchel created Rockpalast. Already in 1975, the WDR broadcast 13 live sessions.

At the beginning of 1976 WDR launched a weekly, half-hour youth programme. Once per month they also presented live music under the name Rockpalast. As part of these programmes Rüchel and Wagner became aware of future world stars early on. For example, U2, who gave their Rockpalast debut in the Berlin Metropol on 4 November 1981 in front of 350 listeners, Tom Petty (14 June 1977), Meat Loaf and Mink DeVille (both in June 1978), Dire Straits (February 1979), or R.E.M., which appeared in front of 280 paying viewers in 1985 in the Zeche Bochum.

Rockpalast quickly became an insider tip. For the presentation of the show Rüchel soon brought in Alan Bangs and Albrecht Metzger.

On 23 July 1977, the legendary first Rockpalast Nacht with Roger McGuinn's Thunderbyrd, Rory Gallagher, and Little Feat rose in the Essen Grugahalle. Since then, two rock nights took place each year, which in addition to the TV distribution were broadcast over radio in Hi-Fi stereo quality. Up to around 1983 the average number of people reached was around 8000 to 10000 in the Grugahalle plus some 25 million remote listeners. Despite their cult status, however, the concerts never became a quota wonder. Even spectacular rock nights such as The Who in 1981 or a concert recording of the Rolling Stones in Paris in 1976 brought it to a viewing audience of just 5%. The disastrous result of the Rockpalast of 19 October 1985, when The Armoury Show, Squeeze, Rodgau Monotones and Ruben Blades drew just 3000 viewers into the Grugahalle (Rüchel: My most depressing moment!) sealed the fate of the show - Rockpalast was discontinued in 1986.

It took until 1995 before Rockpalast came back. The broadcasters were looking for ways to bridge the night hours cheaply, so concerts from the Rockpalast archives were broadcast. After overwhelming viewer reactions, Rüchel began to carefully set up his own productions again. Although the first Loreley festival was still a flop in 1995, in the following year the festival became a major success with David Bowie, Pulp and Iggy Pop. Since then, the annual Loreley festival and Bizarre-Festival have been reliable fixtures in the programme. The same held true for the rock nights in the Philipshalle in Düsseldorf.

Rüchel made friends with some of the music scene's performers over the years, including Pete Townshend, whom he first met in London in 1981, as well as Little Steven.

In 2003 Peter Rüchel left the active role in the show at the Rock am Ring, but continued to serve the Rockpalast as a consultant and editor of the Rockpalast DVD series.

In later years, Rüchel lived with his family in Leverkusen-Wiesdorf. He died following a serious illness at age 81, just 17 days before his 82nd birthday. He was buried on the 12 March 2019 at the cemetery of St. Annen in Berlin-Dahlem.

== Quotation ==
With Rockpalast, Peter Rüchel since the second half of the 1970s has completed what Mike Leckebusch had brought on its way in a short flowering of Beat Club between 1969 and 1972, which, however, was not allowed to continue due to commercial pressure. Together with his congenial director Christian Wagner, the editor Rüchel at WDR established an internationally respected television program reconciling live rock music with this medium. For many years this has been Europe's most successful show it terms of making rock a very close, uncensored and handmade TV experience unforgettable to millions. I am happy and honored to have played part in it as well. Peter Rüchel is one of the great educators of my generation.

— Heinz Rudolf Kunze in September 2010 (translated from German)

== See also ==
- Adolf-Grimme-Preis 1972
- Goldener Bildschirm (1977)
- Three D (1988)
- Echoverleihung 1994
- Arsch huh, Zäng ussenander (2012)
- Peter Sommer
