= KiRaKa =

German children's radio station

Programming
- Format: Children's
- Affiliations: ARD

Ownership
- Owner: WDR

History
- First air date: 4 September 2006
- Last air date: 30 November 2019

KiRaKa – the name is an acronym formed from KInderRAdioKAnal – was a digital radio channel produced by Westdeutscher Rundfunk (WDR) in Cologne, Germany. It is a specialist channel serving children aged 5 to 16.

From 1 January 2016 until 30 November 2019 KiRaKa has broadcast 24 hours a day via cable, satellite, and DAB in Germany, as well as worldwide on the Internet. Its programming at 19.05–20.00 daily as well as at 7.05–8.00 and 14.05–15.00 on Sundays is simulcast on WDR 5.

A variety of children's programming is broadcast between 6.00 and 21.00 daily. Outside these hours KiRaKa played music aimed at the 11-to-16 age group in a segment called Nachteule (Night Owl).

== Reception ==
Originally, KiRaKa was a single programme slot in WDR 5's daily schedule. However, on 29 May 2009 KiRaKa took over the distribution channels formerly used by WDR 2 Klassik. Today, the service is available across Germany via the Astra satellite network, cable TV and DAB radio. It is also available internationally via the Internet and WDR's radio applications for smartphones and tablets.

== Awards ==
In September 2014, KiRaKa and another of WDR's radio stations, Funkhaus Europa, jointly won the award for Best Innovation at the 2014 German Radio Awards.

The award was given to presenter-producers Tuba Tunçak and Mirjam von Jarzebowski for their collaboration on Kelebek im Konzert / Kelebek Konserde (Kelebek in Concert), a project aimed at introducing children to music from other cultures, starting at school level. It culminated in a live concert hosted by one German and one Turkish presenter, during which a variety of Eastern and Western music, as well as a fusion of the two, was played.
