= Simone Augustin =

German journalist & author (born 1976)

- Born: Simone Roßkamp; 23 November 1976 (age 49); Heinsberg, Germany
- Occupations: Journalist and author
- Years active: 1999–present
- Website: Portrait of Simone Augustin (in German)

Simone Augustin also Simone Roßkamp (born 23 November 1976 in Heinsberg) is a German journalist and author.

== Biography ==
After leaving the high school in 1996 she studied theater, film and television studies, German and History of Art at the University of Cologne with a final thesis on Quentin Tarantinos award-winning film Pulp Fiction. She went through various internships and volunteer positions, among others, the Kölner Stadt-Anzeiger, the Kulturzeit, the WDR, the Deutsche Welle or Scholz & Friends in Berlin.

In 1999 she took part in the Young Poetry Series Junge Lyrik in the Martin Werhand Verlag with lyrical texts. Published poems were recited as part of a reading series by various authors in various German cities, such as Bonn, Heinsberg, Münster or Essen, among other things, in 2000 with a reading at the University of Cologne.

After completing her master's degree in the cathedral city of the Rhine, she moved personally and professionally as a journalist for Berlin.

The article Armutsgürtel Berlin-Mitte (88acht for the Rundfunk Berlin-Brandenburg – Das Stadtradio), written in 2004 was awarded the Axel-Springer-Preis in the category radio in May 2005 in the presence of Friede Springer and Springer CEO Mathias Döpfner.

In 2005 Simone Augustin belonged to the 2nd year of the graduates of the EMS Electronic Media School in Berlin.

Her contributions as a freelance journalist were published since 2001 in numerous press organs such as the Film-Dienst, the Kölner Stadt-Anzeiger, The taz or the rbb in Berlin.

Simone Augustin is now working as a journalist and freelance writer based in Berlin.

== Awards ==
- 2005: Axel-Springer-Preis in the category Radio
- 2018: Deutscher Preis für Denkmalschutz, in the category Journalistenpreis
- 2018: Medienpreis der Bundesarchitektenkammer "Architektur bleibt"
