= Rolf Schmidt-Holtz =

German journalist and CEO

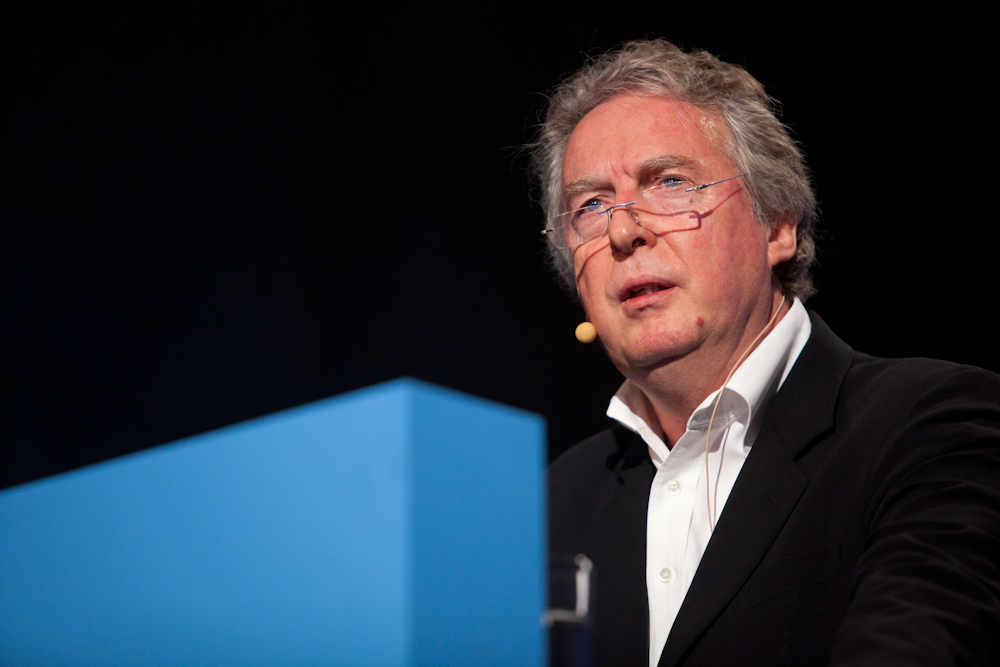
Schmidt-Holtz in 2011

Rolf Schmidt-Holtz (born 31 August 1948 in Martinsreuth, Germany) was Chief Executive Officer (CEO) of Sony Music.

== Career ==
In 1977, Schmidt-Holtz began working for Presse- und Informationsamt der Bundesregierung in Germany. Later he worked as reporter for German broadcaster WDR. In 1987/1988, he was television moderator for Presseclub at broadcaster WDR. In 1988, he became editor-in-chief of Stern. From 1993 to 1996 he was member of Bertelsmann Stiftung. In 1994, he joined German media company Bertelsmann, for which he became CCO in 2000. In 2001, he became CEO for Bertelsmann Music Group in New York City and worked there until 2011. From 2005 to 2007 and again from 2011 to 2015 he was member of Curatoriom of Bertelsmann Stiftung.
