= WDR 4 =

- Wir sind Heimat (We are Heimat)
- Germany
- Broadcast area: North Rhine-Westphalia: FM, DAB+ National: DVB-S, DVB-C; Europe: DVB-S; Worldwide: Internet

Programming
- Language: German
- Format: Oldie-based AC

Ownership
- Operator: Westdeutscher Rundfunk (WDR)
- Sister stations: 1LIVE; 1LIVE diggi WDR 2 WDR 3 WDR 5 WDR Event; WDR Maus

History
- First air date: 1 January 1984

Links
- Webcast: Listen Live
- Website: wdr4.de

WDR 4 is a German commercial-free public radio station owned and operated by the Westdeutscher Rundfunk (WDR). It is designed as an entertainment programme targeted at an audience aged 50 and above.

Originally the station played mostly German Schlager music. Starting in 2011, it transitioned into playing international oldies. As of 2023, WDR 4 has more than 2 million daily listeners.
