= Walter Stern (art critic) =

Walter Stern (1896 in Troisdorf – 1970 in Cartagena, Colombia) was a German art critic and broadcaster associated with the Cologne Progressives.

== Radio broadcasting ==
After competing his studies, Stern joined the Westdeutschen Rundfunk AG (WERAG). In 1929 he became assistant to Hans Stein there, where he remained until the Nazi seizure of power, when he left Germany.

On 17 March 1929 Stern gave a talk about the Raum und Wandbild exhibition broadcast on German radio, which was subsequently printed in the exhibition catalogue.

== Exile ==
He fled from Germany through France and Barcelona to Ibiza. In 1936 he met his family in Zurich, whence they all emigrated to Colombia. Here he worked in a photo lab, as a lecturer in applied arts and making weather houses.
