= Monika Piel =

German television journalist and radio journalist

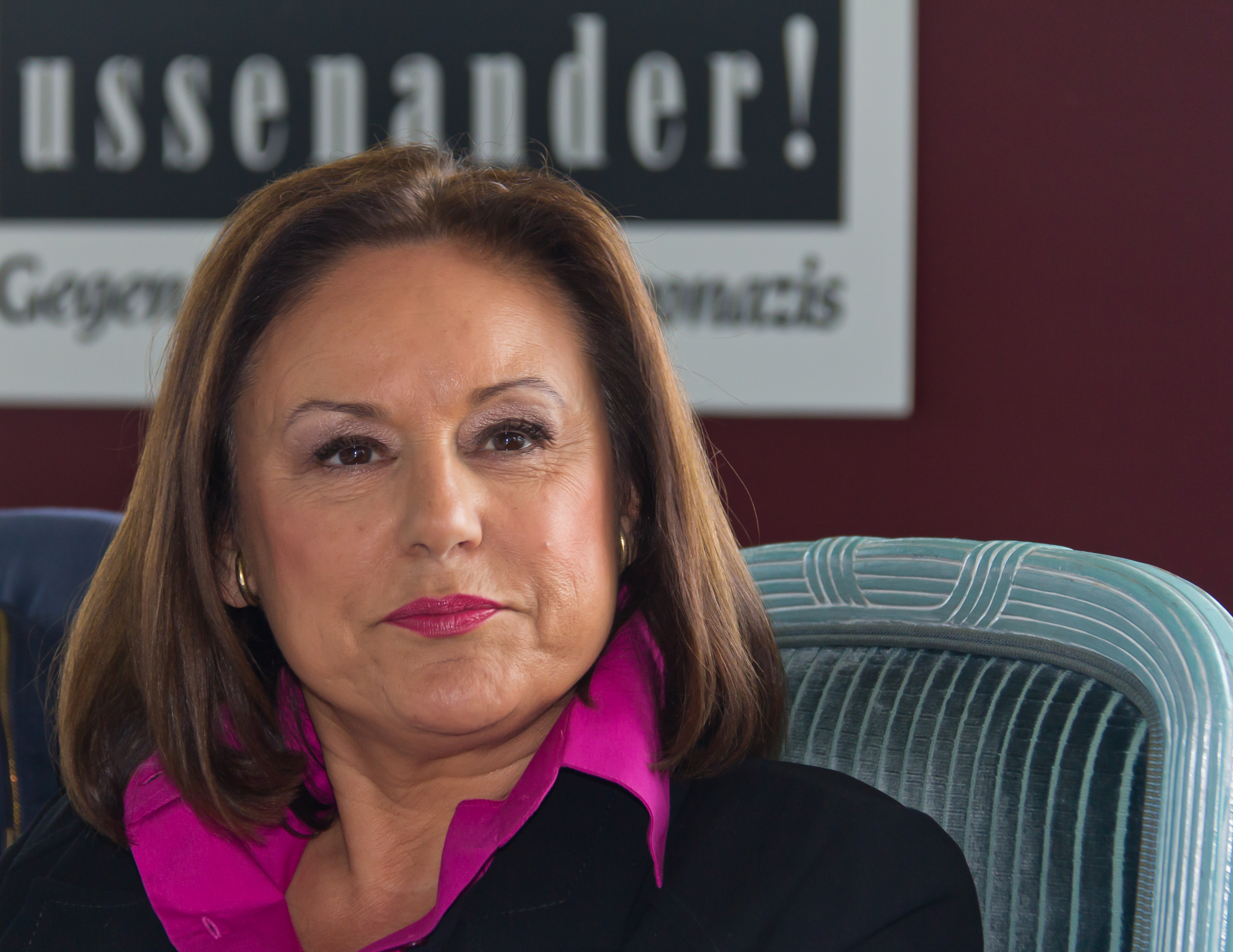
- Piel in 2012
- Born: 9 April 1951 (age 75); Bensberg, Cologne, North Rhine-Westphalia, West Germany
- Occupations: television journalist and radio journalist

Monika Piel (born 9 April 1951 in Bensberg) is a German television journalist and radio journalist.

== Life and career ==
Piel studied Business economics in Cologne. Afterwards she studied Jura and Oriental Studies without graduating.

During her studies she worked as an assistant at the panel discussion Der Internationale Frühschoppen under Werner Höfer. From 1979 to 1989 she worked as an editor and presenter for the current radio magazines of WDR 2. From 1982 to 1984 she worked for WDR as a freelance journalist in Portugal. From 1989 to 1993 Piel was a radio correspondent for economic and financial policy at the WDR studio in Bonn. She then spent a year as head of the radio programme group for business, agriculture, environment and transport.

In 1994 she was appointed as an editor-in-chief of radio and became a program director at WDR 2. From the end of 1997 to 2007 she was radio director of WDR and from 2001 to 2003 she headed the ARD Radio Commission. On 1 April 2007, she took over as the new director of WDR the successor to Fritz Pleitgen. When she was elected to the Broadcasting Council, she received 38 votes with two dissenting votes and two abstentions. Piel had no competitors after two candidates, ZDF editor-in-chief Nikolaus Brender and NDR Justiciar Werner Hahn, had withdrawn.

From 2007 to 2013 she worked as director of German broadcaster WDR. She prematurely terminated her employment on 30 April 2013 for health reasons. She had sleep disorders and tachycardia and was diagnosed with arteriosclerosis in January 2013.

From 2011 to mid-2016, she was CEO of the Cologne Cathedral Cultural Foundation and has been a member of the Board of Trustees since August 2016.

Piel is married to the WDR 2 radio representer Roger Handt. They have a daughter and live in Voreifel.
