= WDR 3 =

- Germany
- Broadcast area: North Rhine-Westphalia: FM, DAB+ National: DVB-S, DVB-C; Europe: DVB-S; Worldwide: Internet

Programming
- Language: German
- Format: Culture (Brokered programming)

Ownership
- Operator: Westdeutscher Rundfunk (WDR)
- Sister stations: 1LIVE; 1LIVE diggi WDR 2 WDR 4 WDR 5 WDR Event; WDR Maus

History
- First air date: 29 March 1964

Links
- Webcast: Listen Live
- Website: wdr3.de

WDR 3 is a German public radio station owned and operated by the Westdeutscher Rundfunk (WDR). It broadcasts a culture and politics-based talk programme with a musical focus on classical music.

As of 2023, WDR 3 has more than 388,000 daily listeners. It is commercial-free.
