= Micky Beisenherz =

German television presenter, radio host and comedy writer

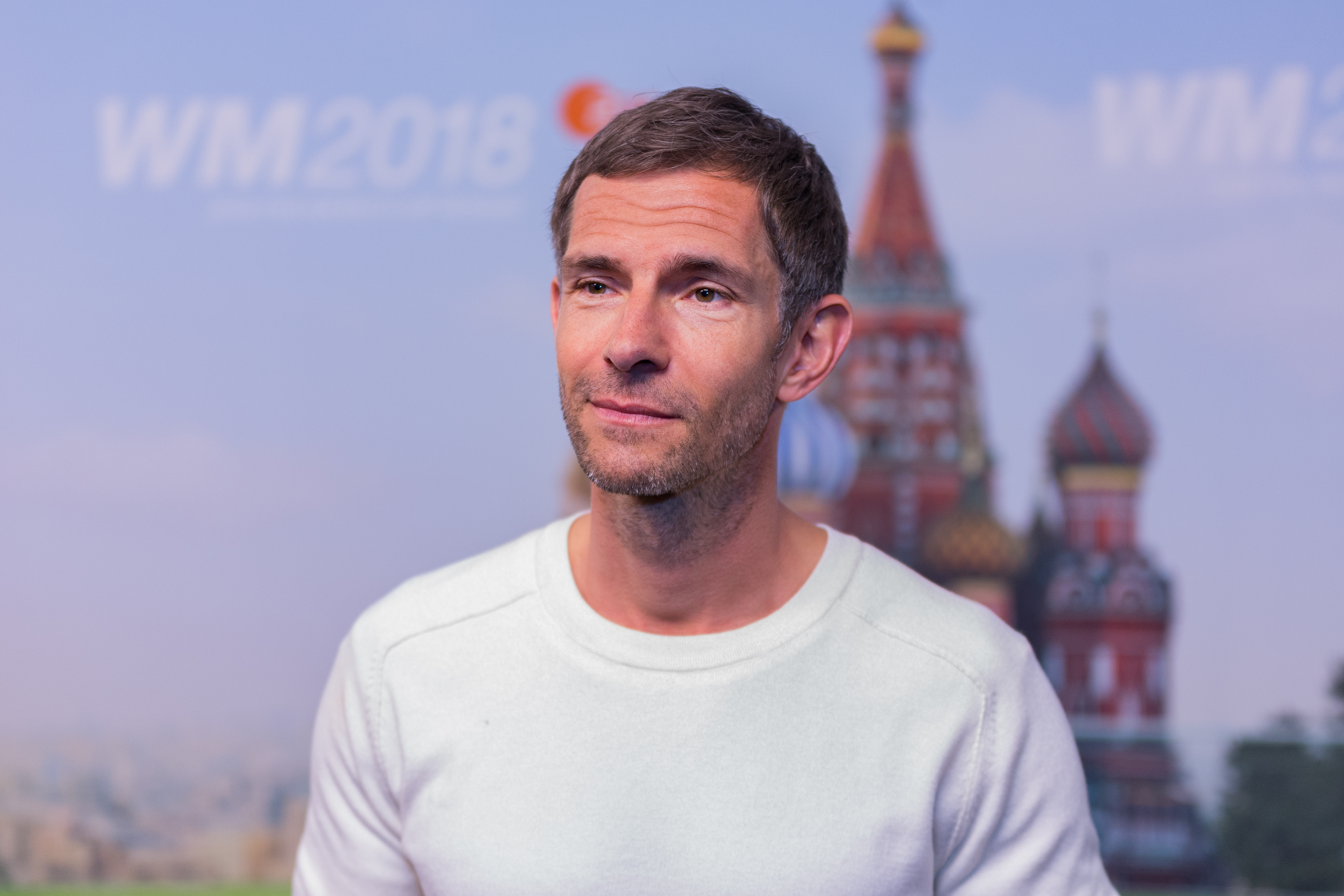
Beisenherz in 2018

Michael Beisenherz (born 28 June 1977) is a German journalist, television host, podcast host, columnist and writer.

== Biography ==
=== Early life ===
Michael Beisenherz was born to a family of Tinsmiths on 28 June 1977 in Recklinghausen but grew up in the nearby town of Castrop-Rauxel where he got his Abitur at the Adalbert Stifter Gymnasium in 1997. He then studied Social science for one semester in Bochum before working on construction sites for about one year.

=== Career ===
Beisenherz started his career on Radio Herne 90,8, a local radio station in the eponymous city. Starting in the 2000s, he worked for Radio NRW until 2010. In 2009, he began writing gags for the hosts of Ich bin ein Star – Holt mich hier raus!, based on the British I'm a Celebrity...Get Me Out of Here! before starting to write entire episodes in 2011. In RTL II, he had his first major on-screen and live appearances when he commentated the broadcast of the Loveparade in 2007 and 2008 and when he co-hosted Der große Deutsch-Test ('The big German [Grammatical/Spelling] Quiz') with Sonja Zietlow from 2010 to 2012. As his career went on, he worked (and still works) for many other major TV channels such as WDR, n-tv, ProSieben and ZDFneo and has written for popular comedians like Dirk Bach, Atze Schröder and Dieter Nuhr.

He has multiple podcasts, and writes columns for Stern (a series called Sorry, ich bin privat hier) and about fashion for Die Zeit.

=== Personal life ===
He was married with Silja Haas, the sister of Sonja Zietlow's husband Jens Oliver Haas, from 2012 to 2019. They had one daughter, Pippa Haas, born in July 2015. As of 2023, he is dating Nikki Hassan-Nia, a Lufthansa flight attendant.

== Notable work ==
=== Filmography ===
Year(s)	Program	Notes
2023	jerks.	Guest Appearance
2020-	#Beisenherz	Host
2020	Der deutsche Comedypreis	Author of one episode
2020	Grill den Henssler	Guest Appearance
2019	Artikel 5 mit Micky Beisenherz	Host
2018	Ultimate Beastmaster, Season 3	Host, with Jeannine Michaelsen
2018	WM Kwartira	Late Night about the Football Worldcup 2018 with Jörg Thadeusz)
2010-2019	Heute Show	Writer of 29 episodes
2017	Die Beste Show der Welt	Guest host
2017–2022	Kölner Treff	Co-hosted with Susan Link replacing Bettina Böttinger.
2015–2017:	Das Duell um die Geld	Live-Commentator
2014-2015	Extra 3	Unspecified crew member in 25 episodes
2015	Jetzt wird's schräg	Guest Appearance
2014–2015	WUMMS! Die Sportshow	
2014–2021	Joko gegen Klaas – Das Duell um die Welt	Writer of 10 episodes with a guest appearance in 2021
2012-2013	Kalkofes Mattscheibe - Rekalked	Writer of 41 episodes
2012	Stadt, Land …	Host
2012	Die Pyramide	Co-hosted with Joachim Llambi of 12 episodes when the show was picked up again after being discontinued in 1994
2012	Leute, Leute!	Writer of 7 episodes
2011	neoParadise	Writer of one episode
2011–2024	Ich bin ein Star - Holt mich hier raus!	After writing gags for the show's hosts, he started writing entire episodes in 2011. (27 as of 2024)
2010-2012	Der große Deutsch-Test	Co-hosted 14 episodes with Sonja Zietlow
2010-2019	Heute Show	Writer of 29 episodes
2010	The Dome	Writer of 2 episodes

=== Podcasts ===
- Apokalypse & Filterkaffee
- With Maik Nöcker and Lucas Vogelsang: Fussball MML
- With Oliver Polak since 2022: Friendly Fire

=== Books ===
- Bedienungsanleitung Mann – so macht Frau ihn funktionstüchtig. Fischer, Frankfurt am Main 2010, ISBN 978-3-596-18675-4.
- Zum Traumpaar in 30 Tagen. Langenscheidt, Berlin 2012, ISBN 978-3-468-73839-5.
- … und zur Apokalypse gibt es Filterkaffee: Dinge, von denen ich nichts verstehe, über die ich aber trotzdem schreibe. Rowohlt, Reinbek 2019, ISBN 978-3-499-63429-1. (A compilation of his columns for the Stern)
- Schreib oder Stirb. Droemer, München 2022, ISBN 978-3-426-28273-1 (with Sebastian Fitzek).

== Awards ==
- Axel-Springer-Preis in the Radio category in 2006
