= Paul Ronzheimer =

German journalist (born 1985)

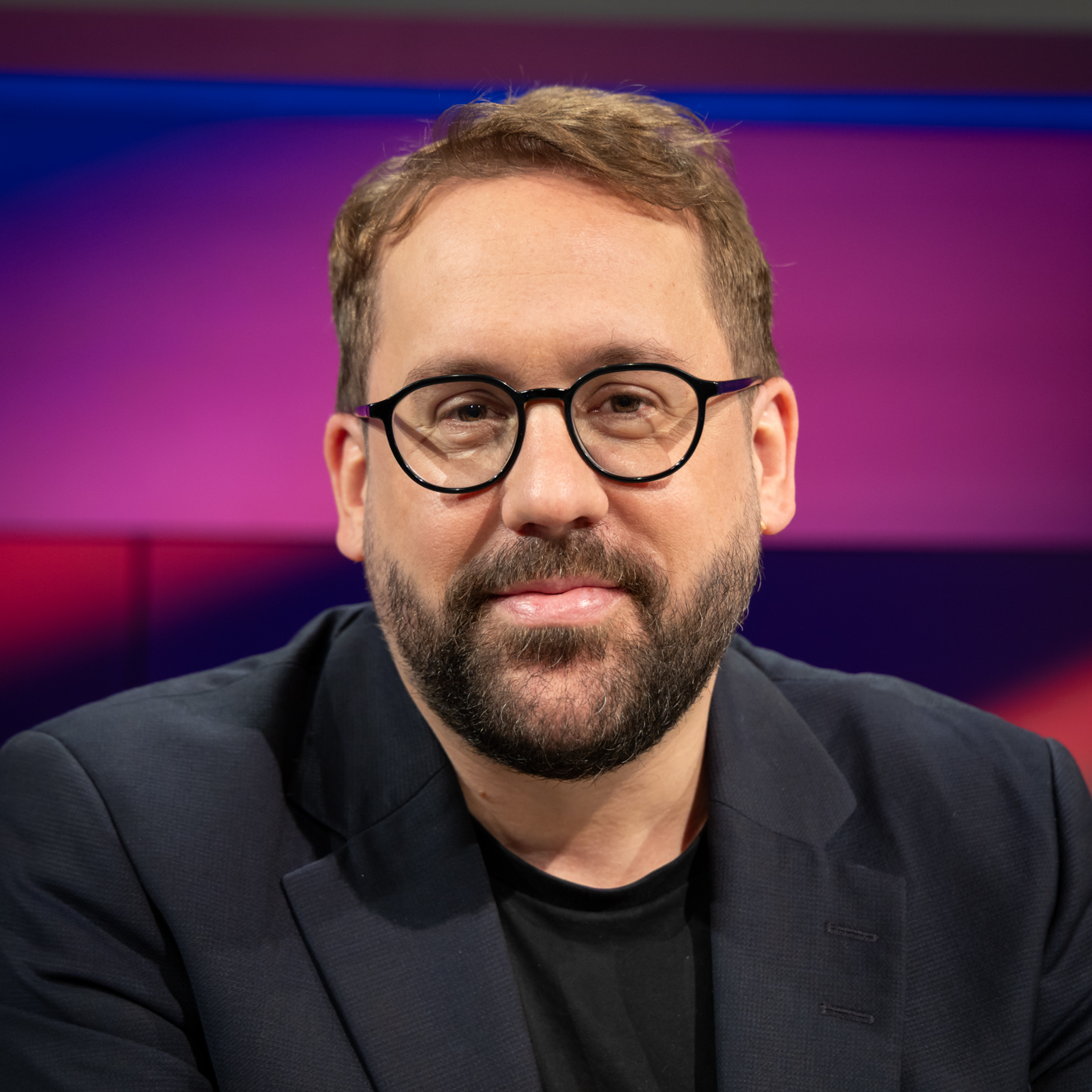
Ronzheimer in 2025

Paul Ronzheimer (born 26 July 1985) is a German journalist and author who serves as the Deputy Editor-in-Chief and a war and crisis correspondent for Bild. Additionally, he is the cross-brand journalistic face for Axel Springer, reporting for various outlets including Welt TV and Politico in addition to BILD. Since August 2023, he hosts a podcast titled "RONZHEIMER.", where he discusses his work, particularly in crisis zones such as Ukraine and Israel, and engages in discussions with prominent guests from politics and journalism about global issues.

== Life ==
Ronzheimer was born in Aurich and spent his childhood in East Frisia. He went to Gymnasium Ulricianum in Aurich. After school he worked as journalist for newspaper Emder Zeitung. Since 2008 Ronzheimer has worked as journalist for the German tabloid Bild. In 2015 he covered the Syrian refugee crisis, live-streaming interviews as he travelled with refugees across Europe. He has worked as a war correspondent in Ukraine, Libya, Turkey, Syria, Afghanistan and in Iraq.

He has interviewed prominent figures including Volodymyr Zelenskyy, Benjamin Netanyahu, Angela Merkel, Frank-Walter Steinmeier, Viktor Orbán, Andrzej Duda, Kyriakos Mitsotakis and Tucker Carlson.

Ronzheimer is a regular guest on major German political talk shows on television.

Ronzheimer, who is openly gay, evoked attention in 2019 when he asked Iranian politician Mohammad Javad Zarif at a press conference during a trip abroad by former German Foreign Minister Heiko Maas why homosexuals were being executed in Iran.

As of February/March 2022 Ronzheimer is a war correspondent in Kyiv during the 2022 Russian invasion of Ukraine. In March 2022 Ronzheimer interviewed in Ukrainian president Volodymyr Zelenskyy and also Klitschko brothers in Kyiv.

In May 2022, the weekly newspaper Die Zeit referred to Ronzheimer as "one of the most globally renowned war reporters." In 2022, prior to the awarding of the German Television Award, several sources criticized that despite his widely received coverage, he was not on the shortlist for "Journalist of the Year".

In 2023 he was awarded "Journalist of the Year 2022" by the trade journal Medium Magazine.

In 2024, his podcast was nominated for the German Podcast Award. In March 2024 he conducted one of the first interviews of the year with Israel's prime minister Benjamin Netanyahu, which has been quoted internationally. In April he conducted a world exclusive interview with Volodymyr Zelenskyy about the Russian invasion of Ukraine.

On 28 September 2024, the day after the assassination of Hassan Nasrallah, Ronzheimer and his crew were taken from their hotel rooms to an unknown location while handcuffed and blindfolded. They were interrogated and released later in the day. The alleged reason for the arrest was Ronzheimer's live interview with the Israeli Public Broadcasting Corporation. The incident was kept secret by Ronzheimer's employer, Bild, until Ronzheimer left Lebanon.

== Awards ==
- 2011: Herbert Quandt Medien-Preis (together with Nikolaus Blome)
- 2016: Axel-Springer-Preis
- 2022: Order of Merit Ukraine, 3rd class

== Works ==
- Ronzheimer, Paul; Verlag Herder (2018). Sebastian Kurz die Biografie (in German). Freiburg. ISBN 978-3-451-39977-0. OCLC 1020792505.
