= Manisha Ganguly =

Indian investigative journalist (born 1995)

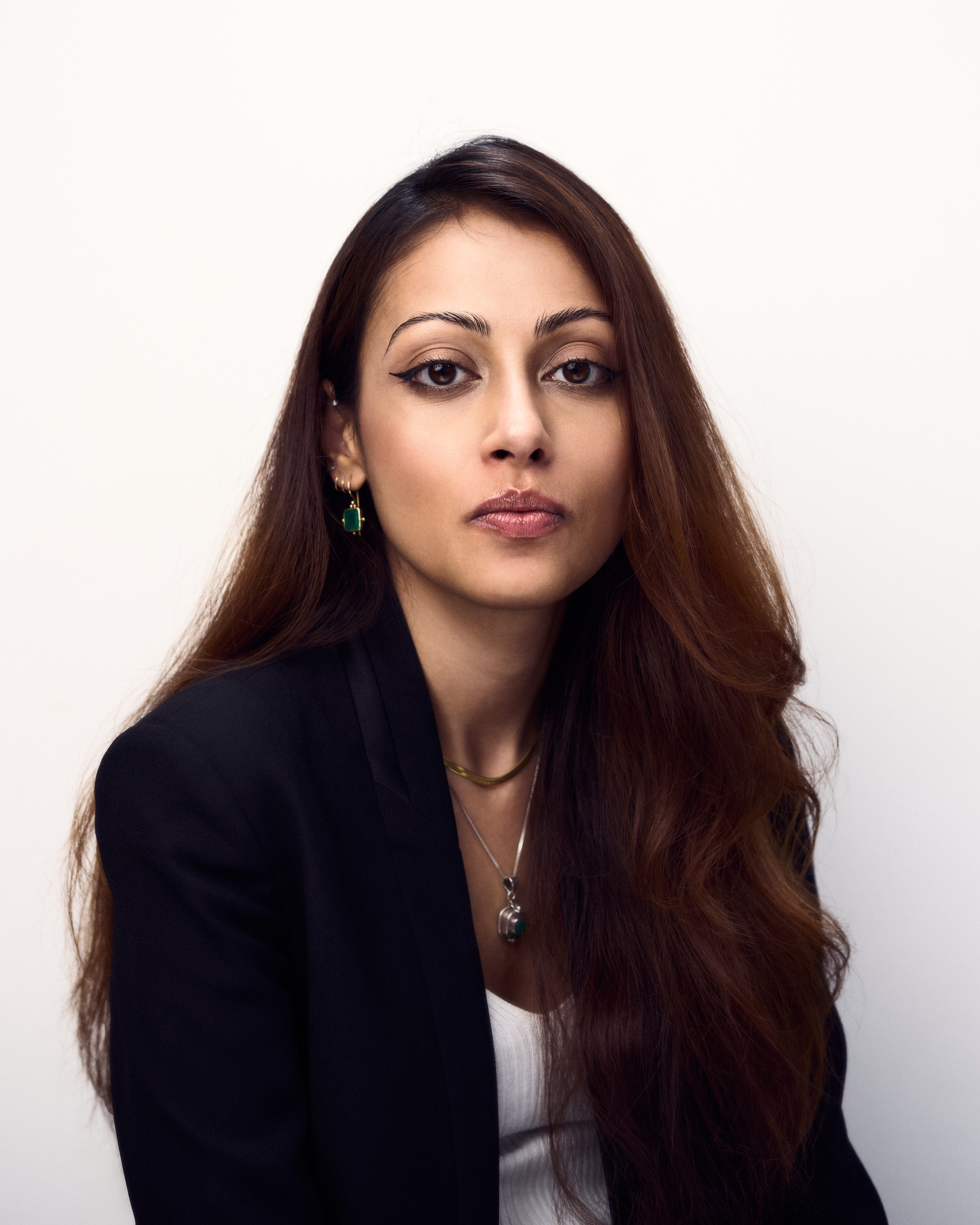
- Ganguly, 2025
- Born: Kolkata, India
- Education: University of Westminster
- Occupation: Investigative journalist
- Employer: The Guardian
- Awards: Forbes 30 Under 30 2021; George Weidenfeld Special Preis for Courage 2020; European Press Prize 2024
- Website: manishaganguly.com

Manisha Ganguly (Bengali: মণীষা গাঙ্গুলী) is an Indian investigative journalist, academic and filmmaker. She is an investigative correspondent and the open source intelligence lead at The Guardian and previously worked as investigative documentary producer for BBC News covering conflict and international affairs. A University of Westminster profile described her thesis as the first academic study of its kind on OSINT and investigative work. She was included in Forbes' 30 Under 30 (Europe) in 2021.

== Early career ==
In 2012, she was one of ten students selected from about 200 applicants for The Times of India’s Kolkata Junior Editorial Board.

After the 2012 Delhi gang rape and murder, Ganguly began reporting on violence against women; in a later interview she described being subject to rape and death threats online as a result. She was the founder and editor of Eyezine, which she co-founded in 2013/14. The publication showcased women reporting on violence against women. According to Ganguly, the website reached 100,000 readers in one month.

Ganguly received a scholarship to study a Master's in Journalism at the University of Westminster in London. In an interview, she claimed that India is a hostile environment for women in journalism. Her first role in investigative journalism in the UK was for The Daily Telegraph.

== Reporting ==
=== BBC ===
For the BBC, she reported on attacks by Russian planes in Syria and war crimes by Turkish-backed forces in the Syrian civil war, war crimes in Libya, use of cluster munitions in Ukraine, human trafficking in the Middle East, reported on the training of the killers of journalist Jamal Khashoggi, and also on COVID-19 in the Middle East. In 2022, an investigation Ganguly co-led documented the torture of Russian anti-war prisoners in a Moscow police station and the identities of the officers. Those officers were subsequently sanctioned by the EU.

=== The Guardian and collaborative investigations ===
For the Guardian and Forbidden Stories, Ganguly was part of an international team that investigated Team Jorge, a group of Israeli contractors led by Tal Hanan which claimed to have meddled in more 30 elections worldwide and Aims, using their software to launch bot armies. BFMTV suspended a presenter amid scandal linked to the investigation.

For The Guardian, she investigated NTC-Vulkan, which develops a Russian disinformation network and cyberweapons used by the Russian military and intelligence agencies, as a part of the Vulkan Files. Ganguly reported that half the special forces deployments in Ukraine consisted of UK special forces. As part of the "Costs of the Crown" team, Ganguly investigated the lineage of colonial looting of jewellery in the royal collection owned by Elizabeth II, and the British royal family. Ganguly reported on the US and Germany training of Saudi border forces accused of mass killing migrants on the Yemen border. Ganguly has also reported on transnational repression of dissidents on European soil, focusing on Saudi Arabia and Iran.

She worked with a consortium of investigative journalists to uncover more than 1,000 unmarked graves of deceased migrants and refugees on the borders of Europe. The investigation was awarded the European Press Prize Special Award.

For the Guardian and Forbidden Stories, Ganguly was part of an international team that investigated the disappearance and torture of Ukrainian journalist Victoria Roshchyna, and reconstructed the Russian prison Taganrog SIZO-2 where Ukrainian civilians were tortured and starved.

==== Reporting on the Gaza war ====
During the Gaza war, Ganguly's Instagram account was restricted by Meta while seeking blood donations for injured journalists. Ganguly led the Guardian's investigation into the Al-Ahli Arab Hospital explosion, reporting that the crater at the blast site required kinetic energy inconsistent with a Joint Direct Attack Munition (JDAM) aerial bomb, and was also inconsistent with an airstrike, concluding that it was "more likely to be a weapon that failed and released its payload over a wide area". She investigated damage to Gaza's hospitals including by Israeli munitions, the Jabaliya refugee camp airstrikes, conducted damage assessment of northern Gaza, and wrote that Israel appeared to be receiving munitions from a US War Reserves Stock Allies-Israel for the war in Gaza. Together with Forbidden Stories and ARIJ, Ganguly investigated the deaths of Palestinian journalists in Gaza and revealed that parts of the IDF viewed Hamas-linked journalists as legitimate targets. Ganguly investigated the 2025 Gaza Strip aid distribution killings using visual evidence, medical data and eyewitness testimony concluding that Israeli forces had "indiscriminately" fired on Palestinians seeking food near Gaza Humanitarian Foundation sites. The Israel Defense Forces denied deliberately targeting civilians.

==== WhatsApp vulnerability ====
In January 2017, as a freelancer, Ganguly wrote a Guardian article reporting on research by security experts that claimed that a WhatsApp design feature could allow encrypted messages to be re-sent under certain conditions, which they described as a potential “backdoor.” The report discussed WhatsApp’s Signal protocol implementation, particularly a mechanism that re-encrypts undelivered messages when users change devices or are offline. The Guardian removed the “backdoor” wording from the headline within eight hours of initial publication online. A later internal review by readers’ editor Paul Chadwick found the research overstated the security threat, but noted the feature itself deserved scrutiny due to WhatsApp’s large user base.

== Academic work and teaching ==
She holds a PhD titled "Future of Investigative Journalism: The Age of Automation, A.I. & Open-Source Intelligence (OSINT)" from the University of Westminster, where she has also taught. According to Ganguly, it is the first PhD in OSINT mapping the impact on investigative journalism. Ganguly's research also focused on incidences of PTSD and the mental health impact of looking at graphic violence in OSINT investigations in war zones. Her doctoral thesis was shortlisted for "outstanding research" in the fields of media, communication, and cultural studies.

She has delivered talks and taught on OSINT and investigative methods at international universities and professional forums. In 2026, she was appointed honorary Senior Research Fellow by City St George's, University of London.

== Media appearances ==
Ganguly has been interviewed and profiled by a range of independent media organisations. In 2021, she was named in Forbes' "30 Under 30" Europe for Media & Marketing.

Additional media coverage includes features in El Mundo, ARTE, L'Orient Le Jour, BBC Outside Source, the Reuters Institute for the Study of Journalism, L'Orient Le Jour, Scoop, Marie Claire, La Repubblica, Monocle Radio, tGlobal Investigative Journalism Network, and Coalition for Women in Journalism. She also participated in a Bellingcat event on OSINT in 2022.

Ganguly is a vocal proponent of women's representation and diversity in the OSINT space and investigative journalism.

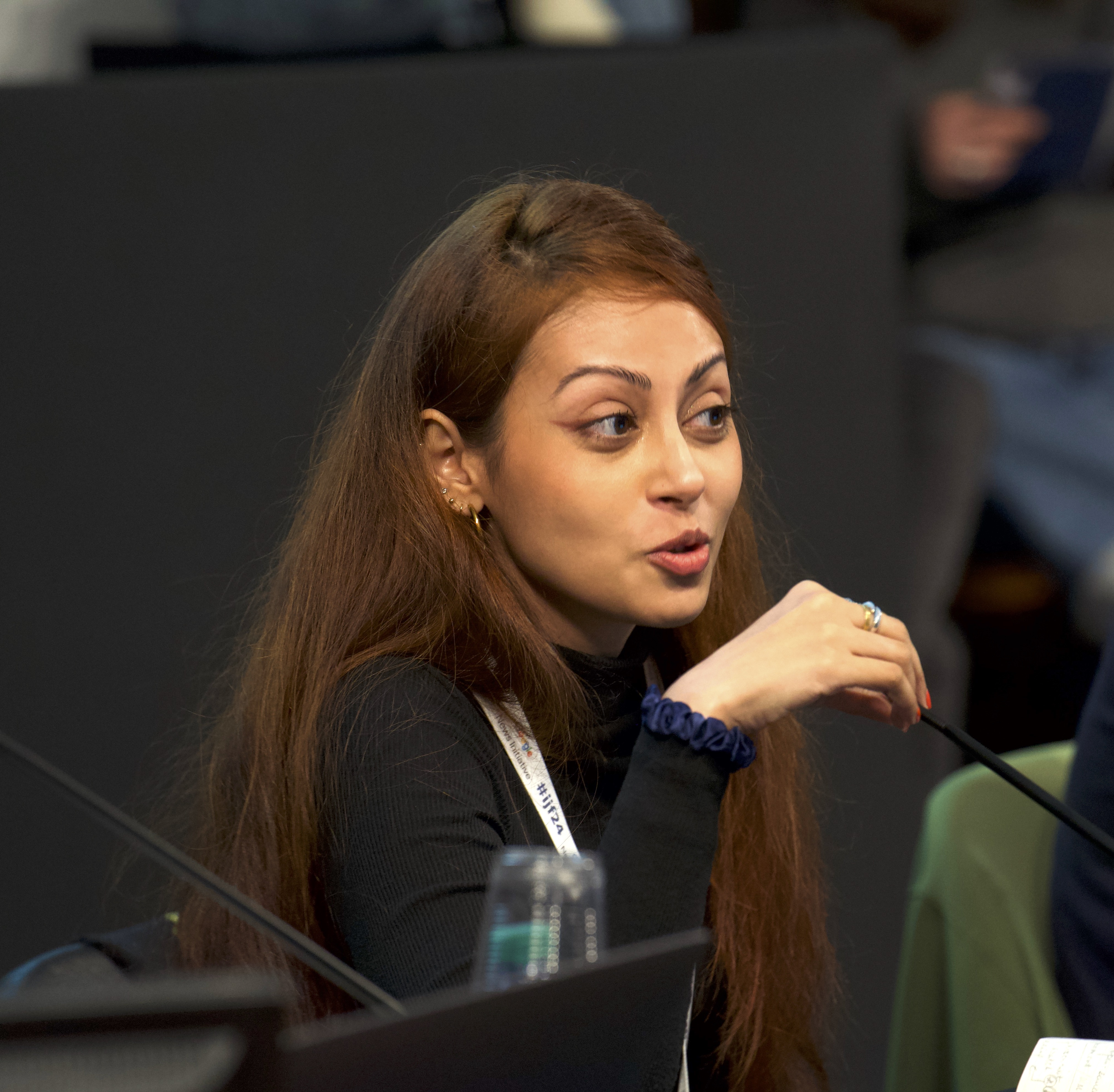
Manisha Ganguly at the International Journalism Festival 2024 in Perugia, Italy

Ganguly has stated that OSINT investigations help confirm ground reality during war and fact-check claims made by state actors.

In 2023, following the Twitter takeover by Elon Musk and banning of ElonJet, Ganguly expressed concern for Twitter becoming "an inhospitable platform for the OSINT community". Ganguly also criticised the verification of the account of assassinated journalist Jamal Khashoggi by Musk for Twitter Blue, tweeting: "Jamal Khashoggi deserves better". She attributed the new verification rules on X to the disinformation put out by OSINT accounts, and "OSINT grifters".

Ganguly has served on the video jury of the Digital Investigative Journalism festival in Modena since 2023.

== Recognition and awards ==
Ganguly has won a number of awards for her work including the 2020 George Weidenfeld Special Preis for Courageous Reporting. In April 2021, Ganguly was included by Forbes magazine on their annual 30 Under 30 in the media category. International awards include MHP 30 to watch under 30 in 2021 and 2020, and Women of the Future Award.

She has won two Amnesty International Media Awards for Best Investigation in 2020 and 2023, the European Press Prize Special Award in 2024, and shortlisted for the One World Media Award for Coronavirus Reporting. She has been shortlisted for Outstanding Young Journalist at the Asian Media Awards in 2020, and for the Broadcast Awards in 2021, three times for the Press Gazette's British Journalism Award 2024, and twice for the UK Press Awards 2024. In 2025, she received two nominations for the Daphne Caruana Galizia Prize for Journalism by European Parliament, two nominations for the Foreign Press Association awards, including for Story of the Year for her Gaza reporting, and shared a win for the European Centre for Press and Media Freedom award.
