= WDR Event =

- Germany
- Broadcast area: North Rhine-Westphalia

Programming
- Language: German

Ownership
- Operator: Westdeutscher Rundfunk (WDR)
- Sister stations: 1LIVE; 1LIVE diggi WDR 2 WDR 3 WDR 4 WDR 5 WDR Maus

History
- First air date: 3 March 2006

Links
- Website: www1.wdr.de/radio/wdr-event/index.html

WDR Event is a German, public radio station owned and operated by the Westdeutscher Rundfunk (WDR). It broadcasts debates from the Bundestag and sports events like the Bundesliga.

Unlike all other WDR stations, it is unavailable 24/7.

The channel is scheduled to close by December 31, 2026.
