= Hans Stein =

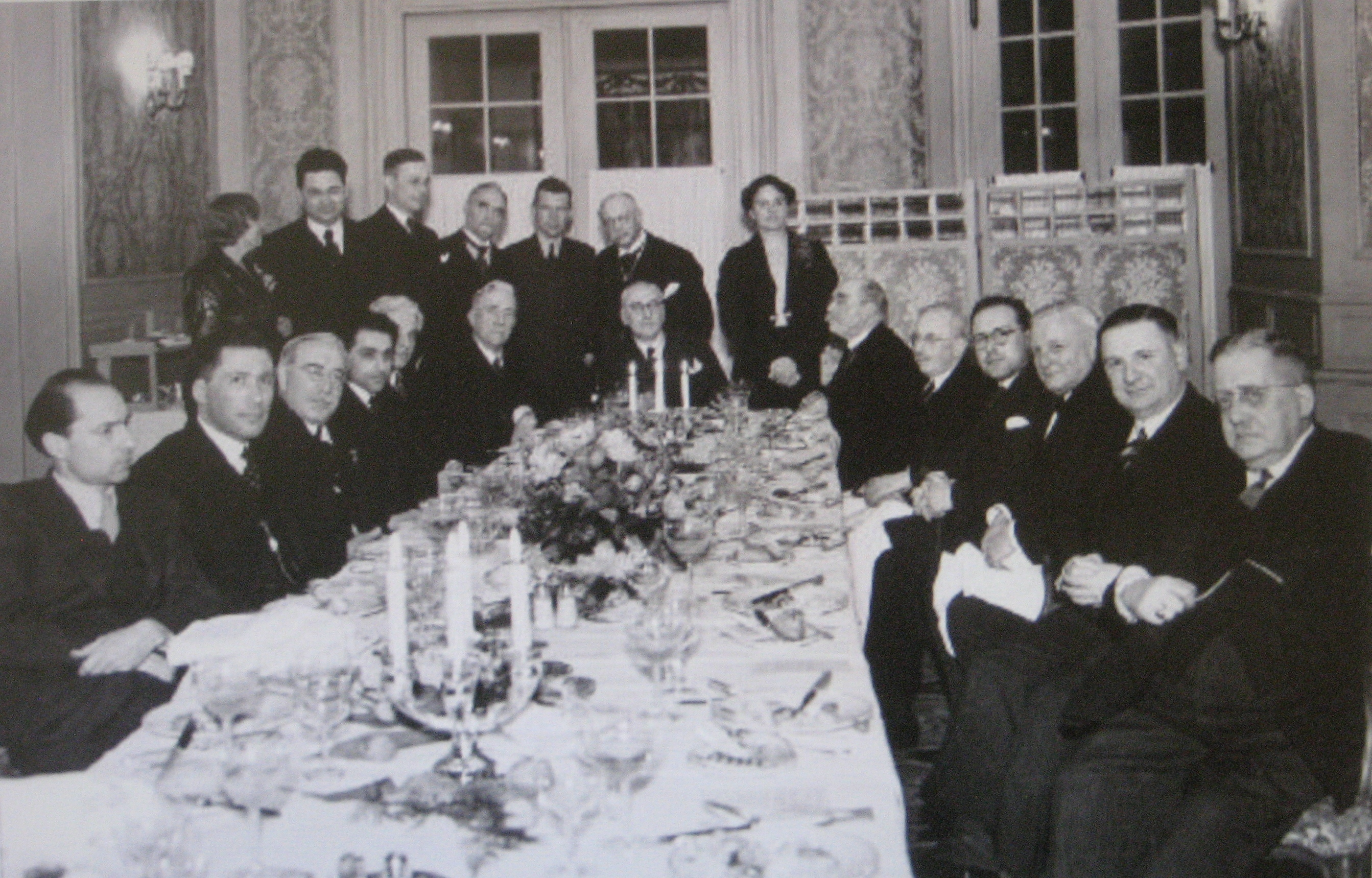
Hans Stein (sitting, 2nd from r.), Amsterdam, 1937

Hans Stein (7 December 1894, Cologne – 3 July 1941, Harrogate) was a German broadcaster and political activist during the 1920s and 1930s.

Stein initially studied Philosophy, linguistics and history, but he left his studies to volunteer for the army during the First World War, gaining the Iron Cross first and second class. He returned to his studies in 1919 gaining a doctorate in economics, economic history and social policy in 1921. Following this he was employed initially as an assistant at the Westdeutschen Rundfunk AG (WERAG). In September 1928 he was promoted to Head of economics and social affairs remaining there until 1933. Walter Stern was his assistant.

He joined the KPD in 1923 and was involved in delivering free seminars on folklore in Cologne. In 1925 he became a scientific correspondent with the Marx-Engels Institute and a member of the Marx-Engels-Gesamtausgabe. During this period he visited Moscow several times.

Following the Nazi seizure of power in 1933 he was dismissed from his position for political reasons. Failing to find any other work he emigrated to the Netherlands, getting work at the International Institute of Social History (IISH), where he ran the German department until 1937. After more difficulties, he was part of the exodus of the IISH when they fled to Great Britain.

== Archive ==
His archive is kept at the International Institute of Social History and includes correspondence with Konrad Adenauer.
