= Rockpalast =

German television show

- Created by: WDR
- Countries of origin: West Germany (1974–1990); Germany (1990–present)

Original release
- Network: WDR
- Release: 4 October 1974

Rockpalast (Rock Palace) is a German music television show that broadcasts live on German television station Westdeutscher Rundfunk (WDR). Rockpalast started on 4 October 1974. Hundreds of rock, heavy metal, and jazz bands have performed on the show. Some acts were recorded for broadcast and for retail sale. All-night marathon shows called “Rock Night” (Rocknacht) were produced once or twice a year from 1977 through 1986 and simulcast throughout Europe via the Eurovision network of TV broadcasters, thereby reaching around 25 million viewers on average. Rockpalast is involved in several German pop, rock, and underground music festivals, once sponsoring the Bizarre-Festival.

The founder and longtime producer of Rockpalast was Peter Rüchel together with Christian Wagner. Alan Bangs and Albrecht Metzger joined as hosts of the Rockpalast Nacht events.
