= Phoenix (German TV channel) =

German free-to-air television channel

- Country: Germany
- Broadcast area: Germany, Austria, Switzerland
- Headquarters: Bonn, Germany

Programming
- Language: German
- Picture format: 1080p HDTV (downscaled to 720p for the DTT and Cable feed)

Ownership
- Owner: ARD and ZDF

History
- Launched: 7 April 1997; 29 years ago

Availability

Terrestrial
- Digital terrestrial television: Varies within locations

Streaming media
- phoenix.de: Watch live

Phoenix (stylised as phoenıx, pronounced [ˈføːnɪks]) is a German free-to-air television channel which is operated jointly by public-service broadcasters ARD and ZDF. It broadcasts documentaries, news, special events coverage and discussion programmes. Phoenix's headquarters are in Bonn, the former West German capital.

== History ==
The creation of Phoenix is credited to the former chancellor Helmut Kohl, who wanted to create a "European Parliamentary Channel". However, the idea was rejected due to criticism by the public channels (ARD and ZDF) and suspicion that political pressure from Kohl could lead to a "Helmut-Kohl-Channel".

The real idea for "Phoenix - Der Ereignis- und Dokumentationskanal" ("Phoenix - the current affairs and documentary channel") came from viewers of ARD and ZDF, who wanted a "media-political correction of faults in the system of information transfer". This created the opportunity to create a "Parliamentary Channel", with the aim of increasing credibility and satisfying consumer demand.

Private channels (RTL and Sat.1) criticized the creation of Phoenix because they were at the time creating their own news channels (n-tv and N24 respectively).

The headquarters of Phoenix were provisionally situated in Cologne. However, in 2000, the headquarters were relocated to studios in Bonn.

Phoenix's highest ratings to date were in August 2006, when it had 1.0% viewer share. With about 4.5 million viewers, it had more viewers than N-TV and N24.

On November 15, 2022, Phoenix closed its SDTV feed across its cable and satellite feeds, which means it is now only available in HD.

In March 2026, it was announced that ARD would close its news channel Tagesschau24 in January 2027 as part a larger-scale consolidation of ARD and ZDF's channel portfolio; Phoenix will become the main news and information channel of the collective under the new branding Phoenix von ARD und ZDF. The rebranded channel will be managed by ARD in partnership with WDR.

=== Cancelled airing of a documentary film with far-right bias ===
Phoenix originally scheduled a documentary film titled Inside Südkorea – Staatskrise im Schatten von Nordkorea und China (lit. 'Inside South Korea: State Crisis in the Shadow of North Korea and China') to be aired on 6 March 2025; ahead of its scheduled broadcast, the documentary was released on the channel's website, as well as on ARD Mediathek and ZDF Mediathek (the online video on demand and streaming services of ARD and ZDF, respectively) on 25 February. The documentary explores the December 2024 South Korean martial law and the political crisis that followed.

The documentary, however, was heavily criticised for alleged far-right bias and for presenting a one-sided portrayal of the political situation in South Korea, favouring the now-impeached President Yoon Suk Yeol in the process. It features interviews with far-right figures, including Uh Dong-gyun, Jeon Kwang-hoon and former U.S. Colonel David S. Maxwell, who repeatedly assert the unproven claims that North Korea and China are working to undermine the democracy in South Korea.

The documentary features Eric J. Ballbach, the expert on the Korean Peninsula from the German Institute for International and Security Affairs (SWP), as the only person with the view against such conspiracy theory. When asked by Der Spiegel magazine, the SWP's communication department expressed the Institute's disappointment, stating that the documentary is 'highly biased and uncritical, both in the selection of information and in some of the interviewees'.

Following complaints and concerns over journalistic standards, Phoenix re-examined the documetary, and by 8 March 2025, it was pulled from the channel's website, ARD Mediathek and ZDF Mediathek. Its originally scheduled airing on 6 March was replaced with a documentary about Donald Trump. The review concluded that Inside Südkorea ignored the complexity of the political situation in South Korea, and does not meet the channel's journalistic standards. The response to the inquiry from Der Spiegel was that the documentary was 'intended to shed light on the previously less reported perspective of the conservative PPP around the suspended head of state Yoon', but it 'failed to do so with the necessary balance'.

== Programming ==
Phoenix broadcasts a deaf-subtitled version of the Tagesschau, ARD's flagship news broadcast, and ZDF's premier news broadcast heute-journal, in German Sign Language.

The channel's flagship news broadcast is Der Tag ("The Day"), which airs from 11:00 pm to midnight. Its length enables extended reports and interviews to be included.

The show Vor Ort ("On Scene") includes live coverage of political events, public lectures by important personalities, press conferences and assemblies of the Bundestag and Bundesrat.

Daily talk shows like Phoenix Runde (Phoenix Roundtable) with Alexander Kähler, Unter den Linden with Michaela Kolster or Michael Hirz, discuss current topics with experts or politicians.

As a benchmark in coverage, a "Meet the Press"-styleshow, Internationaler Frühschoppen is broadcast Sunday at 12 noon when the ARD's Presseclub is not broadcast.

The series Historische Debatten (Historical Debates) and Historische Ereignisse (Historical Events), with journalist Helmut Illert, examine important topics relating to the development of the Federal Republic of Germany.

Phoenix is comparable to the American channel C-SPAN or the British BBC Parliament, because they also cover government and national politics.

== Alignment of programming ==
Phoenix's stated aim is it to create "balance of the shortening of information, which are seen in news and magazines on television". The programming should be a "truthful illustration of the reality in correspondence with the constitutional order of the publicly-funded broadcast and television stations in Germany". The target is fulfilled with current reportages and documentaries from the vast archive of ARD and ZDF, as well as international productions from Discovery Channel and the BBC, dubbed into German.

== Logo history ==
Logo of Phoenix from 1997 to 2000

Logo of Phoenix from 2000 to 2008

Logo of Phoenix from 2008 to April 2012

Logo of Phoenix since April 2012 to June 3, 2018

Logo of Phoenix HD from April 2012 to June 3, 2018

Station-Logo since June 4, 2018

OnAir-Logo of Phoenix SD & HD since June 4, 2018

== Audience share ==
=== Germany ===
	January	February	March	April	May	June	July	August	September	October	November	December	Annual average
1997	-	-	-	-	-	-	-	-	-	-	-	-	-
1998	-	-	-	-	-	-	-	-	-	-	-	-	▲0.3%
1999	-	-	-	-	-	-	-	-	-	-	-	-	▲0.4%
2000	0.4%	0.4%	0.4%	0.4%	0.3%	0.4%	0.4%	0.4%	0.4%	0.3%	0.4%	0.4%	0.4%
2001	0.5%	0.4%	0.4%	-	0.4%	0.4%	0.4%	0.5%	-	0.5%	0.5%	0.5%	▲0.5%
2002	0.4%	0.5%	0.5%	-	0.5%	-	0.6%	-	-	-	-	-	0.5%
2003	0.6%	0.6%	0.7%	0.6%	0.4%	0.5%	0.5%	0.6%	0.5%	0.5%	0.5%	0.6%	0.5%
2004	0.6%	0.5%	0.5%	0.6%	0.5%	0.4%	0.6%	0.6%	0.5%	0.4%	0.5%	0.6%	0.5%
2005	0.5%	0.5%	0.6%	0.7%	0.5%	0.5%	0.7%	0.8%	0.7%	0.6%	0.6%	0.6%	▲0.6%
2006	0.6%	0.5%	0.6%	0.7%	0.6%	0.7%	0.8%	1.0%	0.7%	0.7%	0.7%	1.0%	▲0.7%
2007	0.9%	0.8%	0.7%	1.0%	0.8%	0.8%	1.0%	1.1%	0.8%	0.8%	0.8%	1.0%	▲0.9%
2008	0.9%	0.9%	1.0%	0.8%	0.8%	0.7%	1.0%	1.0%	0.9%	0.9%	1.0%	1.1%	0.9%
2009	1.1%	0.9%	0.9%	1.1%	0.9%	0.9%	1.1%	1.1%	1.0%	0.9%	0.9%	1.1%	▲1.0%
2010	1.0%	0.9%	0.8%	0.9%	0.9%	0.9%	1.0%	1.2%	0.9%	1.0%	1.0%	1.3%	1.0%
2011	1.0%	1.1%	1.2%	1.2%	1.0%	1.1%	1.1%	1.2%	1.0%	1.0%	1.0%	1.2%	▲1.1%
2012	1.1%	1.0%	0.9%	1.1%	1.2%	1.0%	1.1%	1.2%	1.0%	1.0%	1.0%	1.3%	1.1%
2013	1.1%	1.1%	1.0%	1.0%	1.0%	1.1%	1.1%	1.2%	1.2%	1.1%	1.1%	1.3%	1.1%
2014	1.1%	1.0%	1.1%	1.1%	1.0%	1.0%	1.1%	1.3%	1.1%	1.1%	1.1%	1.3%	1.1%
2015	1.1%	1.2%	1.2%	1.1%	1.2%	1.1%	1.1%	1.1%	1.0%	1.0%	1.0%	1.2%	1.1%
2016	1.0%	1.0%	1.1%	1.0%	1.1%	1.0%	1.1%	1.1%	1.0%	1.0%	1.1%	1.2%	1.1%
2017	1.1%	1.0%	1.0%	1.1%	1.0%	1.1%	1.2%	1.2%	1.0%	1.0%	1.0%	1.2%	1.1%
2018	1.1%	0.9%	1.1%	1.0%									
