= Dennis Gastmann =

German writer and former television journalist (born 1978)

Dennis Gastmann (born 1978) is a German writer and former television journalist.

== Biography ==
Gastmann studied political science and journalism at the University of Hamburg and began his career at the German public broadcaster NDR, where his early work ranged from political satire to investigative journalism. He later moved into foreign reporting and became known for the award winning travel documentary series Mit 80.000 Fragen um die Welt.

Alongside his television work, Gastmann increasingly established himself as an author of travel writing, literary reportage and fiction. His published books include Mit 80 000 Fragen um die Welt, Gang nach Canossa, Geschlossene Gesellschaft, Atlas der unentdeckten Länder, Der vorletzte Samurai, Dalee, Der blaue Lampion, and Orient-Express – ein Abenteuer.

Gastmann lives in Hamburg.

== Works ==
- Mit 80 000 Fragen um die Welt (2011)
- Gang nach Canossa (2012)
- Geschlossene Gesellschaft (2014)
- Atlas der unentdeckten Länder (2016)
- Der vorletzte Samurai (2018)
- Dalee (2023)
- Der blaue Lampion (2024)
- Orient-Express – ein Abenteuer (2026)
