= WDR 1 =

- Last logo
- Germany
- Broadcast area: North Rhine-Westphalia

Programming
- Language: German

Ownership
- Operator: Westdeutscher Rundfunk (WDR)

History
- First air date: 1 January 1956
- Last air date: 31 March 1995

WDR 1 was a German public radio station owned and operated by the Westdeutscher Rundfunk (WDR). It was replaced by 1LIVE in 1995.

== History ==
First logo

The station was originally the information program of the WDR and combined entertainment and pop music on the one hand with public service information and educational mission on the other. Instead of a fully formatted program, WDR 1 offered many special interest programs, a high proportion of words and a targeted regional focus.

WDR 1 officially went on air on January 1, 1956, after the regional stations WDR and Norddeutscher Rundfunk (NDR) had been formed from the NWDR. Until the NDR radio programs were reorganized in 1981, WDR 1 and NDR 1 broadcast a joint program that was only temporarily split into regional programs.
