= 1LIVE =

German radio station

Coordinates: 50.9485°N 6.94479°E

- Cologne; Germany
- Broadcast area: North Rhine-Westphalia: FM, DAB; National: DVB-S, DVB-C; Europe: DVB-S; Worldwide: Internet

Programming
- Language: German
- Format: Contemporary hit radio

Ownership
- Owner: WDR
- Sister stations: 1LIVE diggi WDR 2 WDR 3 WDR 4 WDR 5 WDR Event; WDR Maus

History
- First air date: 1 April 1995

Links
- Webcast: Listen Live
- Website: einslive.de

1LIVE is a radio station operated by the Westdeutscher Rundfunk public broadcasting corporation in Germany. It broadcasts a CHR format specialised in popular music. Aimed at the 14–39 age demographic, the average age of its listeners is 34.

== History ==
On 1 April 1995, 1LIVE first aired. 1LIVE was intended to replace WDR 1 as a more youth centric radio station, this was because WDR1 had an ever ageing listenership.

On 1 September 2000, 1LIVE was relaunched. Between pm and 8 pm the programming was not subdivided into different named shows but instead given the name of the day and the current hour, for example: "Eins Live - Donnerstag - Achtzehn" (translated as: "One Live - Thursday - Eighteen"). All shows broadcast after 8 PM had a name. Monday to Thursday the show was named Kultkomplex playing specialist music. On Sunday the show Heimatkult was broadcast, this introduced new bands from within the broadcasting area. On 1 November 2006, 1LIVE introduced a new logo which replaced the pink "1" numeral with the letter "I" in the "L1VE" word-mark and thus the "1" numeral was put alongside the new "LIVE" word-mark in a pink rhombus. On 5 January 2007, 1LIVE was relaunched again. From now on all shows between 5 AM and 6 PM took the host's name. Between 6pm and 8pm a new call-in-show "Der Sektor" is broadcast.

As of 2023, more than 2.5 million people listen to 1LIVE every day. Every second person under the age of 30 in 1LIVE's broadcasting area, North Rhine-Westphalia, which is named Sektor, listens to 1LIVE at least once a day.

== Shows ==
Since 2007, shows between 5 AM and 8 PM have taken the name of their hosts, and playout is normally mainstream popular music. For the show "Plan B" 1LIVE plays a more specialist music selection. During nighttime slots there are sometimes: crime thrillers, talk, audiobooks or a documentary shows.

== 1LIVE diggi ==
1LIVE diggi
- Cologne; Germany
- Broadcast area: North Rhine-Westphalia: DAB; National: DVB-S, DVB-C; Europe: DVB-S; Worldwide: Internet

Programming
- Language: German
- Format: Rhythmic CHR

Ownership
- Owner: WDR
- Sister stations: 1LIVE; WDR 2 WDR 3 WDR 4 WDR 5 WDR Event; WDR Maus

History
- First air date: 16 August 2004

Links
- Webcast: Listen Live
- Website: www.1livediggi.de

1LIVE diggi is a commercial-free channel broadcasting since 16 August 2004. It broadcasts a Rhythmic CHR format with electronic, dance-pop and hip hop music, comedy and news (every hour) and can be received via livestreaming, DAB+, DVB-S and DVB-C. Its music playlist is updated every week. The originally unhosted programme features hosts since 2013.

== 1LIVE Kunst ==
On 4 October 2006, 1LIVE Kunst, a channel that dealt with cultural topics and demanding pop music, was launched. At 3:15 pm a four-hour programme was broadcast which was repeated until next afternoon. 1LIVE Kunst could only be received via Internet Stream. 1LIVE Kunst was discontinued in 2009.

1LIVE Kunst combined alternative music with contributions produced by WDR 2, WDR 3, WDR 5 and itself.

== Events ==
1LIVE organises several parties and concerts in its broadcasting area. Among other things the festival 1LIVE Königstreffen, the music award 1LIVE Krone for German artists and the newcomer-festival Das erste Mal. Besides, they arrange several concerts broadcast over the radio and many more. 1LIVE broadcasts and organizes so called radio concerts with famous musicians like Green Day, Kings of Leon and The Kooks. Fans can get tickets for these concerts only by a lottery on 1LIVE's website and in several radio shows. The concert with Placebo in 2009 was broadcast to more than 20 radios stations in over 15 countries of the world.

On Friday 11 October 2019, 1LIVE joined forces with several European radio stations, all other members of the European Broadcasting Union, including Swedish SR P3, German RBB Fritz, Belgian VRT Studio Brussel, Irish RTÉ 2fm, French Radio France Mouv and Dutch NPO 3FM headed up by British BBC Radio 1 for a special simulcast show named "Europe's Biggest Dance Show". The show started at 7pm UK time and the format was that every country involved would takeover for 1 hour of the 7-hour show, showcasing some of their countries' best dance music starting off with Annie Mac for Radio 1. The German hour was shared with 30 mins being broadcast by 1LIVE in Cologne and 30 mins by Radio Fritz in Berlin. Most stations chose to feature at least one live DJ set, with Radio 1 having DJ Jax Jones live in the mix. The show reached an estimated 18 million listeners. Each participant station linked to Radio 1 where BBC staff mixed the show at New Broadcasting House in London, the mixed show was then sent back out to the participating stations to broadcast. Radio 1 Head of Programmes Aled Haydn-Jones said before the show "This is going to be a real radio event! Having seven countries showcasing the best dance music from their country is absolutely the best way it can delivered. I'm proud BBC Radio 1 partnered with seven other radio stations and I can't wait to hear it!".

== Awards ==
In 2006, 1LIVE got an ECHO as they are Bester Medienpartner des Jahres (translated: best media contact of the year).

== Frequencies ==
=== FM ===
The list and strength of all WDR stations are available online.

- Aachen/Euregio 106,4 MHz
- Arnsberg 96,0 MHz
- Bad Oeynhausen 107,7 MHz
- Bergisches Land 106,7/104,7 MHz
- Cologne 102,4 MHz
- Eifel 105,5 MHz
- Hallenberg 105,7 MHz
- Höxter 107,3 MHz
- Ibbenbüren 102,5 MHz
- Kleve 103,7 MHz
- Monschau 99,7 MHz
- Lübbecke 93,6 MHz
- Münsterland 107,9 MHz
- Olpe 104,7
- Ostwestfalen 105,5 MHz
- Rhine-Ruhr 106,7 MHz
- Sauerland 107,0 MHz
- Schmallenberg 100,1 MHz
- Siegerland 107,2 MHz
- Siegen 107,5 MHz
- Warburg 98,2 MHz

=== DAB ===
The station is also broadcast on DAB+ single frequency ensembles on the following frequency blocks:

- WDR NRW 11D, 192.352 MHz is the original frequency across most of North-Rhine Westphalia
- WDR Regional 9A, 202.928 MHz is the additional frequency to cover the rest of the federal state

=== DVB-S ===
- Astra 19.2°E, Transponder 93, Frequency 12.266 GHz, Polarisation: horizontal, Symbolrate 27,500 MB/s, FEC 3/4

== Literature ==
- Thomas Guntermann: Zwischen Reichweite und Image. Von WDR 1 zu Eins Live: öffentlich-rechtlicher Rundfunk im Wandel. Paragon-Verlag, Bochum 1998, ISBN 3-932872-02-9
