= WDR 5 =

- Radio mit Tiefgang (Radio with depth)
- Germany
- Broadcast area: North Rhine-Westphalia: FM, DAB+ National: DVB-S, DVB-C; Europe: DVB-S; Worldwide: Internet

Programming
- Language: German
- Format: News/Talk

Ownership
- Operator: Westdeutscher Rundfunk (WDR)
- Sister stations: 1LIVE; 1LIVE diggi WDR 2 WDR 3 WDR 4 WDR Event; WDR Maus

History
- First air date: 7 October 1991

Links
- Webcast: Listen Live
- Website: wdr5.de

WDR 5 is a German public radio station owned and operated by the Westdeutscher Rundfunk (WDR). It broadcasts a news/talk format, with only a small potion of non-mainstream music. Programmes for kids, entertainment and comedy formats are also aired.

As of 2023, the station has more than 700,000 daily listeners. It is commercial-free.

== History ==
WDR 5 went on air on October 7, 1991, on the former frequencies of WDR 1 as the new North Rhine-Westphalia wave. At that time, the old WDR 1 program was initially continued from 6:00 AM. to 1:00 PM.

=== Streaming Service ===
In early 2023 WDR 5 published an app on the App Store enabling the user to be able to listen back to the broadcasts of an earlier period
