= WDR 2 =

- Zusammen sind wir der Westen (Together we are the west)
- Cologne; Germany
- Broadcast area: North Rhine-Westphalia: FM, DAB+ National: DVB-S, DVB-C; Europe: DVB-S; Worldwide: Internet
- Frequency: see below

Programming
- Language: German Language
- Format: Adult Contemporary/Information

Ownership
- Owner: WDR
- Sister stations: 1LIVE; 1LIVE diggi WDR 3 WDR 4 WDR 5 WDR Event; WDR Maus

History
- First air date: 30 April 1950 (as NWDR UKW West)

Links
- Webcast: Listen Live
- Website: www.wdr2.de (in German)

WDR 2 is a radio station owned and operated by the Westdeutscher Rundfunk (WDR) public broadcasting organization in Germany. It focuses on contemporary pop and rock music for an adult audience and on information. It is also WDR's broadcast sport events channel and produces the live soccer reports programme ARD-Bundesligakonferenz, which covers the results of all games played in the national Bundesliga and is relayed by up to 20 other radio stations across Germany. The channel reaches an average of 3.4 million listeners daily.

== Frequencies ==
=== FM ===
- Aachen / Euregio 100.8 MHz
- Arnsberg 99.4 MHz
- Bad Oeynhausen 99.1 MHz
- Bonn/Cologne Lowland 100.4 MHz
- Cologne 98.6 MHz
- Dortmund 87.8 MHz
- Eifel 101.0 MHz
- Erftkreis 88.4 MHz
- Höxter 96.4 MHz
- Ibbenbüren 96.0 MHz
- Kleve 93.3 MHz
- Lübbecke 96.0 MHz
- Märkischer Kreis and Kreis Olpe 93.5 MHz
- Monschau 94.2 MHz
- Münsterland 94.1 MHz
- Oberbergischer Kreis 91.8 MHz
- Ostwestfalen 93.2 MHz
- Remscheid 95.7 MHz
- Rheinisch-Bergischer Kreis 100.4 MHz
- Rhine-Ruhr 99.2 MHz
- Sauerland 102.1 MHz
- Schmallenberg 93.8 MHz
- Siegen 97.1 MHz
- Siegerland 101.8 MHz
- Warburg 91.8 MHz
- Wittgensteiner Land 92.3 MHz
- Wuppertal 99.8 MHz

=== DAB+ Digital Radio ===
North Rhine-Westphalia: Channel 11D

=== Satellite ===
Astra 1H (19.2° East) Tr. 93
