= Westdeutscher Rundfunk =

German public broadcaster, founded 1955

WDR
- Logo used since 2012
- Type: Broadcast radio, television and online
- Country: Germany
- Founded: 1955
- Headquarters: Cologne
- Area: North Rhine-Westphalia
- Official website: www.wdr.de

Westdeutscher Rundfunk Köln (pronounced [ˈvɛstˌdɔʏtʃɐ ˈʁʊntfʊŋk ˈkœln]; "West German Broadcasting Cologne"), shortened to WDR (pronounced [ˌveːdeːˈʔɛʁ]), is a German public-broadcasting institution based in the state of North Rhine-Westphalia with its main office in Cologne. WDR is a constituent member of the consortium of German public-broadcasting institutions, ARD. As well as contributing to the output of the national television channel Das Erste, WDR produces the regional television service WDR Fernsehen (formerly known as WDF and West3) and six regional radio networks.

== History ==
=== Origins ===
The Westdeutsche Funkstunde AG (WEFAG) was established on 15 September 1924.

There was a substantial purge of left wing staff following the National-Socialist seizure of power in 1933. This included Ernst Hardt, Hans Stein, and Walter Stern.

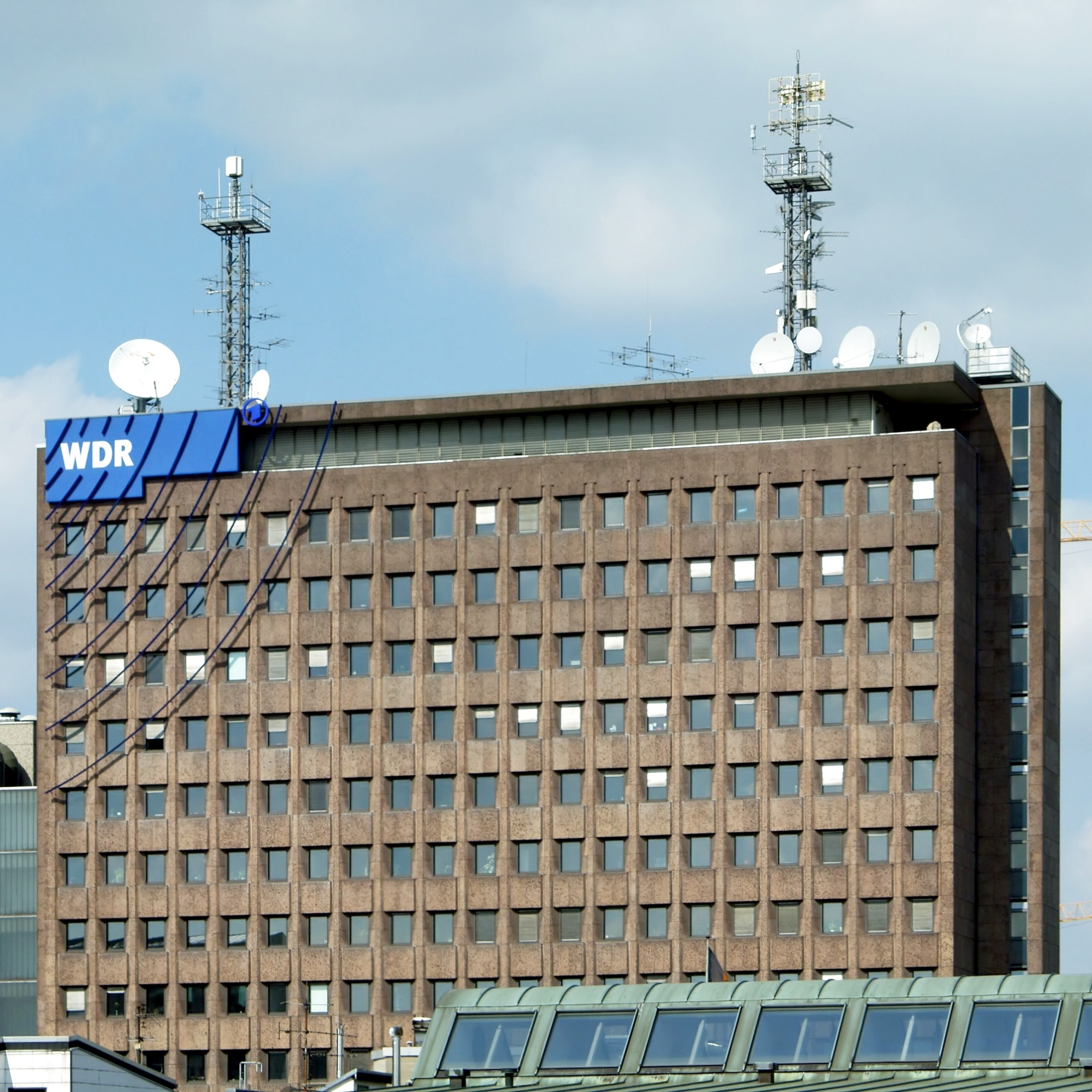
One of WDR's buildings in Cologne

WDR was created in 1955, when Nordwestdeutscher Rundfunk (NWDR) was split into Norddeutscher Rundfunk (NDR) – covering Lower Saxony, Schleswig-Holstein, and Hamburg – and Westdeutscher Rundfunk, responsible for North Rhine-Westphalia, West Germany. WDR began broadcasting on two radio networks (one produced jointly with NDR) on 1 January 1956. WDR constitutes the most prominent example of regional broadcasting in Germany.

=== Directors ===
- 1926–1933: Ernst Hardt, director general of WERAG
- 1933–1937: Heinrich Glasmeier, director general of "Reichssender Köln"
- 1937–1941: Anton Winkelnkemper, director general of "Reichssender Köln"
- 1942–1945: closed
- 1945–1947: Max Burghardt, director general of NWDR
- 1947–1961: Hanns Hartmann, director general of NWDR and since 1956 of WDR
- 1961–1976: Klaus von Bismarck
- 1976–1985: Friedrich-Wilhelm von Sell
- 1985–1995: Friedrich Nowottny
- 1995–2007: Fritz Pleitgen
- 2007–2013: Monika Piel
- 2013–2024: Tom Buhrow
- since 2025: Katrin Vernau

== Logo history ==
WDR's first and original logo used from 1956 to 1970.

WDR's second and former logo used from 1970 to 1994.

WDR's third and previous logo used from 1994 to 2012.

WDR's fourth and current logo since 2012.

== Funding ==
WDR is in part funded by the limited sale of on-air commercial advertising time; however, its principal source of income is the revenue derived from viewer and listener licence fees. As of 2023 the monthly fee due from each household for radio and television reception was €18.36. These fees are collected not directly by WDR but by a joint agency of ARD (and its member institutions), ZDF, and Deutschlandradio.

== Services ==
=== Television ===
WDR began its regional television service, Westdeutsches Fernsehen (WDF), on 17 December 1965. On 27 August 1967, when West Germany broadcast its first color TV program, WDF used a live broadcast originating from a Bosch outside broadcast van to start broadcasting in color. In 1988, the channel was renamed West 3; since 1994, it has been known as WDR Fernsehen.

While the programmes are mainly run from their Cologne headquarters, they also have a number of sub-regional studios contributing to a regular broadcast called Lokalzeit with the opt-outs "aus Aachen" (Aachen), "OWL" (Bielefeld), "aus Bonn" (Bonn), "aus Dortmund" (Dortmund), "aus Düsseldorf" (Düsseldorf), "aus Duisburg" (Duisburg), "Ruhr" (Essen), "aus Köln" (Cologne and Bonn), "Münsterland" (Münster), "Südwestfalen" (Siegen) and "Bergisches Land" (Wuppertal) for each respective region. WDR has its current affairs and regional politics studios in Düsseldorf.

It has served as the production entity for shows on Das Erste, such as Verbotene Liebe ('Forbidden Love'), which, over the years, has introduced many young actors to the German audience, such as Andreas Stenschke, Jo Weil, Luca Zamperoni and Kay Böger. The Sportschau is produced for ARD in Cologne, and WDR contributes to ARD Digital, 3sat and arte.

=== Radio ===
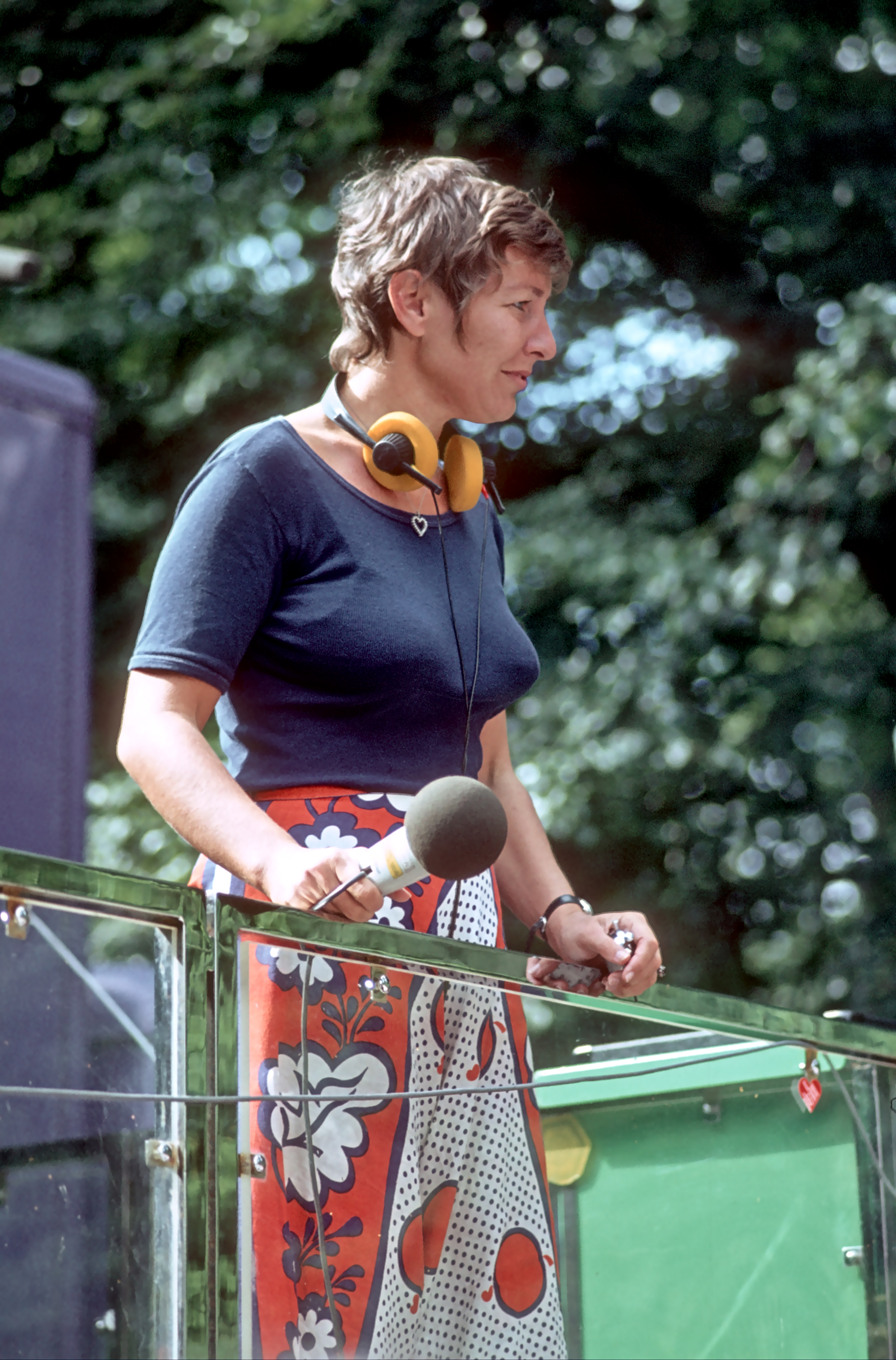
Hallo Ü-Wagen with Carmen Thomas in 1982

A long-running talk show on wheels was Hallo Ü-Wagen ("Hello Radio Van"), which ran from 1974 to 2010 with Carmen Thomas as the original host.

WDR's main radio channels are available on FM and digital (DAB+), as well as via cable and satellite:

- 1LIVE is a popular music channel modelled on BBC Radio 1 and aimed at a young audience. Its schedules include such non-mainstream night-time programmes as Heimatkult, focusing on pop music from Germany, and Lauschangriff, a series of audio-books.
- WDR 2, featuring adult-oriented popular music, focuses strongly on national and regional news, current affairs, and sport.
- WDR 3, the cultural channel, offers mostly classical, jazz and world music as well as radio drama and spoken-word features dealing with literature and the performing arts.
- WDR 4 (motto: Melodien für ein gutes Gefühl, "Melodies for a good feeling") is a channel aimed chiefly towards an older audience. Its focus is on tuneful music – in particular, oldies and classic hits: popular music of the 1960s to the 1980s or later – with more specialized programming (operetta, country, folk) in the evenings. Around 30–40% of WDR 4's musical output is made up of German-language songs.
- WDR 5 features spoken-word programming with the focus on present-day culture and society. Between 6.05 and 9.45 each Monday to Saturday morning the channel offers news, background briefing, interviews, and correspondents' reports in a sequence entitled Morgenecho. The main lunchtime and early-evening news and current affairs programmes Mittagsecho (at 13.05–14.00 on Mondays to Fridays and 13.30–14.30 on Sundays) and Echo des Tages (at 18.30–19.00 daily) are both co-productions with Norddeutscher Rundfunk (NDR) in Hamburg. Additionally, WDR 2's 30-minute round-up of the day's most important news reports, Berichte von heute, is simulcast by WDR 5 on Monday to Friday evenings at 23.30. WDR 5 also carries children's radio programming from KiRaKa at 19.05–20.00 each evening as well as on Sundays at 7.05–8.00 and 14.05–15.00.
- COSMO (earlier WDR 5 Funkhaus Europa – an offshoot of WDR 5 – and now a joint production of Radio Bremen, RBB, and WDR) is a channel principally aimed at serving immigrants and promoting integration. It features a wide selection of world music. It is not available over-the-air in every part of WDR's broadcasting area.

Broadcast only via DAB (Digital Radio) as well as DVB-S and partly DVB-C:

- 1LIVE diggi – off-mainstream music and news from 1LIVE
- WDR Event – program of events for special occasions
- WDR Maus – radio for children aged 5 to 16

Former radio channels are:

- WDR 1 – Predecessor of 1 Live
- WDR 2 Klassik – Contributions from WDR 2 with classical music, briefly replaced by the online service Mein WDR Radio after it was discontinued
- 1LIVE Kunst – web radio with cultural themes and sophisticated pop music
- Radio Dortmund – The first local radio station in North Rhine-Westphalia, which was started in 1985 as part of a cable pilot project. Radio Dortmund ran for nine years until WDR needed the frequency for a new WDR 2 "regional window".
- KiRaKa – web radio for children aged 5 to 16
- WDR Info – WDR data and news service with visual information
- WDR VERA – full-length traffic news spoken non-stop by a computer

== Musical organizations ==
- WDR Symphony Orchestra Cologne (WDR Sinfonieorchester Köln)
- WDR Rundfunkorchester Köln
- WDR Big Band
- WDR Rundfunkchor Köln
- Studio for Electronic Music (WDR)

== See also ==
- German television
- Public broadcasting
- Rockpalast
- WDR Computerclub
