= List of radio stations in Germany =

This list of radio stations in Germany lists all radio stations broadcast in Germany, sorted first by legal status, then by area. Excluded from this list are Internet-only and cable-only radio stations.

The abbreviations LW, MW, SW, FM, DVB-S, DVB-T, DAB and DRM indicate the systems the radio station uses for broadcasting.

== Public radio stations ==
=== National radio stations ===
- Deutschlandfunk (FM, DAB, DVB-S, internet)
- Deutschlandfunk Kultur (FM, DAB, DVB-S, internet)
- Deutsche Welle (DVB-S)
- Dokumente und Debatten (DVB-S, DAB, internet)
- Deutschlandfunk Nova (DAB, DVB-S, internet)

=== Bayerischer Rundfunk (BR) ===
- Bayern 1 (FM, DAB, DVB-S, DVB-C, Internet)
- Bayern 2 (FM, DAB, DVB-S, DVB-C, Internet)
- Bayern 3 (FM, DAB, DVB-S, DVB-C, Internet)
- BR-Klassik (FM, DAB, DVB-S, DVB-C, Internet)
- BR24 (FM, DAB, DVB-S, DVB-C, Internet)
- BR Heimat (DAB, DVB-S, DVB-C, Internet)
- BR Schlager (DAB, DVB-S)

=== Hessischer Rundfunk (hr) ===
- hr1 (FM, DAB+, DVB-C, DVB-S, Internet)
- hr2-kultur (FM, DAB+, DVB-C, DVB-S, Internet)
- hr3 (FM, DAB+, DVB-C, DVB-S, Internet)
- hr4 (FM, DAB+, DVB-C, DVB-S, Internet)
  - hr4 Mitte
  - hr4 Nord
  - hr4 Rhein-Main
- hr-info (FM, DAB+, DVB-C, DVB-S, Internet)
- Dasding (FM, DAB, DVB-S, DAB+, Internet)

=== Mitteldeutscher Rundfunk (MDR) ===
- MDR
  - MDR Sachsen (FM, DVB-S)
  - MDR Sachsen-Anhalt (FM, DVB-S)
  - MDR Thüringen (FM, DVB-S)
- MDR Aktuell (FM, DAB+, DVB-S)
- MDR Jump (FM, DVB-S)
- MDR Klassik (DAB)
- MDR Kultur (FM, DVB-S)
- MDR Schlagerwelt (DAB)
- MDR Sputnik (FM, DAB, DVB-S)
- MDR Tweens (DAB+)
- Sorbischer Rundfunk (FM)

=== Norddeutscher Rundfunk (NDR) ===
- NDR 1:
  - NDR 1 Niedersachsen (FM, DAB, DVB-S)
  - NDR 1 Radio MV (FM, DAB, DVB-S)
  - NDR 1 Welle Nord (FM, DAB, DVB-S)
  - NDR 90,3 (Hamburg) (FM, DAB, DVB)
- NDR 2 (FM, DVB-S)
- NDR Blue (DAB, DVB-S)
- NDR Info (FM, DAB, DVB-S)
- NDR Info Spezial (DVB-S)
- NDR Kultur (FM, DVB-S)
- N-Joy (FM, DVB-S)
- NDR Schlager (DAB)

=== Radio Bremen (RB) ===
- Bremen Eins (FM, DAB+, DVB-C, DVB-S, Internet)
- Bremen Zwei (FM, DAB+, DVB-C, DVB-S, Internet)
- Bremen Next (FM, DAB+, DVB-C, DVB-S, Internet)
- Bremen Vier (FM, DAB+, DVB-C, DVB-S, Internet)
- Bremen Fünf/NDR Info (FM, DAB+)
- Bremen Cosmo (FM, DAB+, DVB-C, DVB-S, Internet)

=== Rundfunk Berlin-Brandenburg (rbb) ===
- Antenne Brandenburg (FM, DAB+, DVB-S)
- Cosmo (FM, DAB+, DVB-S)
- Fritz (FM, DAB+, DVB-S)
- Radioeins (FM, DAB+, DVB-S)
- Radio 3 (FM, DAB+, DVB-S)
- rbb24 Inforadio (FM, DAB+, DVB-S)
- rbb 88,8 (FM, DAB+, DVB-S)
- Sorbischer Rundfunk (FM)

=== Saarländischer Rundfunk (SR) ===
- Antenne Saar (DAB)
- SR 1 (FM, DAB, DVB-S)
- SR 3 Saarlandwelle (FM, DAB, DVB-S)
- SR Kultur (FM, DAB, DVB-S)
- Dasding (FM, DAB, DVB-S, DAB+, Internet)

=== Südwestrundfunk (SWR) ===
- Dasding (FM, DAB, DVB-S, DAB+, Internet)
- SWR1:
  - SWR1 Baden-Württemberg (FM, DAB, DVB-S)
  - SWR1 Rheinland-Pfalz (FM, DAB, DVB-S)
- SWR3 (FM, DAB, DVB-S)
- SWR4:
  - SWR4 Baden-Württemberg (FM, DVB-S)
  - SWR4 Rheinland-Pfalz (FM, DAB, DVB-S)
- SWR Aktuell (FM, DAB, DVB-S)
- SWR Kultur (FM, DAB, DVB-S)

=== Westdeutscher Rundfunk (WDR) ===
- 1LIVE (FM, DAB+, DVB-S, internet)
- 1LIVE diggi (DAB+, DVB-S, internet)
- Cosmo (FM, DAB+, DVB, internet)
- WDR 2 (FM, DAB+, DVB-S, internet)
- WDR 3 (FM, DAB+, DVB-S, internet)
- WDR 4 (FM, DAB+, DVB-S, internet)
- WDR 5 (FM, DAB+, DVB-S, internet)
- WDR Event (DAB+, DVB-S, internet)
- WDR Maus (DAB+, DVB-S, internet)

== Private radio stations ==
=== Radio stations which broadcast in more than one state ===
- 80s80s (DAB+, internet)
- 90s90s (DAB+, internet)
- Absolut Bella (DAB+, internet)
- Absolut Germany (DAB+, internet)
- Absolut Hot (DAB+, internet)
- Absolut Classics (DAB+, internet)
- Absolut Relax (DAB+, internet)
- Absolut Top 2000er (DAB+, internet)
- Aida Radio (DAB+, internet)
- Beats Radio (DAB+, internet)
- Brillux Radio (DAB+)
- Domradio (DVB-S, DAB)
- Energy Digital (DAB+)
- ERF Jess (FM, DVB-S, DAB+)
- ERF Plus (DAB+)
- Jam FM (FM, DVB-S, DVB-C)
- Klassik Radio (FM, DVB-S, DAB+, internet)
- Nius Radio (DAB+, internet)
- Oldie Antenne (DAB+)
- Radio Aktiv-FM (DVB-S)
- Radio Bob (FM, DAB+)
- Radio Horeb (DVB-S, DVB-T, FM, DAB+)
- Radio Nostalgie (DAB+)
- Radio Neue Hoffnung (DVB-S)
- Radio Paloma (DVB-C, DAB+)
- Radio Schlagerparadies (DAB+)
- Radio Teddy (FM, DVB-S, DAB+)
- Rock Antenne (DAB+)
- RTL Radio (FM, DAB+, DVB-S, DVB-C)
- Schlager Radio (FM, DAB+, DVB-S)
- Schwarzwaldradio (FM, DAB+)
- Star FM (FM, DAB+)
- sunshine live (FM, DVB-S, DVB-T, DAB+)
- Toggo Radio (DAB+, DVB-S)

=== Baden-Württemberg ===
==== Areal radio stations ====
- BigFM, Stuttgart (FM, DAB +)
- Hitradio Antenne 1 (FM, DAB +)
- Radio 7 (FM, DAB +)
- Radio Regenbogen (FM, DAB +, DVB-S)

==== Local radio stations ====
- Baden FM (FM, DVB +)
- Die Neue 107.7 (FM, DAB +)
- Die neue Welle (FM, DAB +)
- Donau 3 FM (FM, DAB +)
- Hitradio Ohr (FM, DAB +)
- Hitradio MS One (FM)
- Radio Neckarburg (FM)
- Radio Seefunk (FM)
- Radio Ton (FM, DAB +)
- Regenbogen 2 (FM nur in Heilbronn/Odenwald/Rhein-Neckar, DAB +)

==== Noncommercial radio stations ====
- Bermudafunk (FM)
- echo-fm 88,4 (FM)
- Freies Radio für Stuttgart (FM)
- Freies Radio Freudenstadt (FM)
- HoRadS (FM)
- Kanal Ratte, Schopfheim (FM)
- LernRadio, Karlsruhe (FM)
- Querfunk, Karlsruhe (FM)
- Radio Dreyeckland, Freiburg im Breisgau (FM)
- Radio freeFM, Ulm (FM)
- Radio StHörfunk, Schwäbisch Hall (FM)
- Wüste Welle, Tübingen (FM)

=== Bavaria ===
==== Statewide ====
- Antenne Bayern (FM, DVB-S)
- Oldie Antenne (DAB+)
- Radio Galaxy (DAB, FM not statewide)
- Rock Antenne (DAB, DVB-S, FM not statewide)
- KULTRADIO (DAB, Internet)
- egoFM (FM not statewide, DVB-S)

==== Munich and surrounding areas ====
- AFK M94.5 (FM)
- Be4 Classic Rock (DAB)
- Christliches Radio München (FM)
- egoFM (FM)
- Energy München (FM)
- LORA München (FM)
- Nova Radio (DAB)
- Radio 2Day (FM)
- Radio Arabella (FM)
- Radio Charivari (FM)
- Radio Deluxe (DAB)
- Radio Feierwerk (FM)
- Radio Gong 96,3 (FM)
- Radio Horeb (FM, DVB-S)
- Radio Opera (DAB)
- 106.4 Top FM (FM)

==== Nuremberg and surrounding areas ====
- AFK max (FM)
- Camillo 92,9 (FM)
- Charivari 98,6 (FM)
- Energy Nürnberg (FM, DAB)
- Fantasy Bayern (DAB)
- Gong 97,1 (FM)
- Hit Radio N1 (FM)
- Jazztime Nürnberg (FM)
- Pirate Radio (DAB)
- Pray 92,9 (FM)
- Radio AREF (FM)
- Radio F (FM)
- Radio Meilensteine
- Radio Z (FM)
- Star FM (FM)
- Truckradio (DAB)
- Vil Radio (FM, DAB)

==== Augsburg and surrounding areas ====
- Fantasy Aktuell (DAB)
- Fantasy Bayern (DAB)
- hitradio.rt1 (FM)
- Radio Augsburg (DAB)
- Radio Fantasy (FM)
- Radio Kö (DAB)
- Smart Radio (DAB)

==== Würzburg and surrounding areas ====
- 106,9 Radio Gong (FM)
- Radio Charivari Würzburg (FM)
- Radio Opera (FM)

==== Unterfranken (not including Würzburg) ====
- Radio Primaton (FM)
- Radio Primavera (FM)
- Radio Galaxy - Aschaffenburg (FM)

==== Oberfranken ====
- Radio Bamberg (FM)
- Radio Eins (FM)
- Radio Euroherz (FM)
- Radio Galaxy (FM)
- Radio Mainwelle (FM)
- Radio Plassenburg (FM)

==== Mittelfranken (not including Nuremberg) ====
- Radio 8 - Ansbach (FM)
- Radio Galaxy - Ansbach (FM)

==== Oberpfalz ====
- gong fm (FM)
- Radio Charivari Regensburg (FM)
- Radio Galaxy (FM)
- Radio Ramasuri (FM)

==== Niederbayern ====
- Radio AWN (FM)
- Radio Trausnitz (FM)
- Radio Galaxy (FM)
- unser Radio (Deggendorf) (FM)
- unser Radio (Passau) (FM)
- unser Radio (Regen) (FM)

==== Schwaben (not including Augsburg) ====
- Donau 3 FM (FM)
- Radio 30plus (FM)
- Radio Galaxy (FM)
- RSA-Radio Ostallgäu (FM)
- RT. 1 Südschwaben (FM)
- Das Neue RSA-Radio (FM)
- RT.1 Nordschwaben (FM)

==== Oberbayern (not including Munich) ====
- Ensemble am Chiemsee (FM)
- Inn-Salzach-Welle (FM)
- Radio Alpenwelle (FM)
- Radio Charivari Rosenheim (FM)
- Radio Chiemgau (FM)
- Radio Hitwelle (FM)
- Radio Galaxy (FM)
- Radio IN (FM)
- Radio Oberland (FM)
- Radio Regenbogen (FM)
- 106.4 Top FM (FM)
- Untersberg live (FM)

=== Berlin and Brandenburg ===
- BB Radio (FM)
- Berliner Rundfunk 91,4 (FM)
- Elsterwelle (FM)
- ENERGY Berlin (FM)
- 100,6 Flux FM (FM)
- HitRadio SKW (FM)
- JAM FM (FM, DVB-C)
- JazzRadio Berlin (FM)
- 98.8 Kiss FM (FM, DAB+)
- Metropol FM (FM, DVB-C)
- KCRW Berlin (FM)
- Power Radio (FM)
- Radio B2 (FM, DAB+)
- 94.5 Radio Cottbus (FM)
- Radio Paloma (DAB+, DVB-C)
- Radio Paradiso (FM)
- Radio Russkij Berlin (FM)
- Radio Teddy (FM)
- 104.6 RTL (FM, DVB-T)
- 94,3 rs2 (FM)
- 105'5 Spreeradio (FM, DVB-T)
- Star FM (FM)
- the wave (DVB-T)

=== Bremen ===
- Energy Bremen (FM)

=== Hamburg ===
- Alsterradio (FM)
- Energy Hamburg (FM)
- Oldie 95 (FM)
- Radio Hamburg (FM)

=== Hesse ===
- ERF Jess (FM, DVB-S)
- harmony.fm (FM, DVB-S)
- Hit Radio FFH (FM, DVB-S)
- Main FM (FM)
- planet more music radio (FM, DVB-S)
- Radio Bob (FM)

=== Lower Saxony ===
- BBC - British Broadcasting Services (FM)
- ffn (FM)
- Hit-Radio Antenne (FM)

=== Northrhine-Westphalia ===
==== Local radio stations ====
- 107.8 Antenne AC (FM)
- Antenne Düsseldorf (FM)
- Antenne Münster (FM)
- Antenne Niederrhein (FM)
- Antenne Unna (FM)
- Hellweg Radio (FM)
- Hit Radio Vest (FM)
- NE-WS 89.4 (FM)
- Radio Emscher Lippe (FM)
- Radio Aachen (FM)
- Radio 90,1 Mönchengladbach (FM)
- Radio 91.2 (FM)
- Radio Berg (FM)
- Radio Bielefeld (FM)
- 98.5 Radio Bochum (FM)
- Radio Bonn/Rhein-Sieg (FM)
- Radio Duisburg (FM)
- Radio en (FM)
- Radio Erft (FM)
- Radio Essen (FM)
- Radio Gütersloh (FM)
- 107.7 Radio Hagen (FM)
- 94.9 Radio Herford (FM)
- Radio Herne 90acht (FM)
- Radio Hochstift (FM)
- Radio Kiepenkerl (FM)
- Radio Köln (FM)
- Radio K.W. (FM)
- Radio Leverkusen (FM)
- Radio Lippe (FM)
- Radio Lippewelle Hamm (FM)
- Radio MK, Iserlohn (FM)
- 92.9 Radio Mülheim (FM)
- Radio Neandertal (FM)
- Welle Niederrhein (FM)
- 106.2 Radio Oberhausen (FM)
- Radio RSG (FM))
- radio RST (FM)
- Radio Rur (FM)
- Radio Sauerland (FM)
- Radio Siegen (FM)
- Radio WAF (FM)
- Radio Westfalica (FM)
- Radio WMW (FM)
- Radio Wuppertal (FM)

==== Others ====
- Antenne Bethel (FM)
- Radio 30 plus (FM)
- Radio 700 (FM, SW)
- teutoRADIO plus (FM)

=== Mecklenburg-Vorpommern ===
- 103.3 Radio FDZ (FM)
- Antenne Mecklenburg-Vorpommern (FM)
- LOHRO
- Ostseewelle (FM)

=== Rhineland-Palatinate ===
==== Statewide radio stations ====
- big FM (FM)
- Radio RPR (FM)
- Rockland Radio (FM)
- RTL Radio (FM)

==== Local radio stations ====
- Antenne 98.0 (FM)
- Antenne West (FM)
- Metropol FM (FM)
- Radio Quer (FM)
- Studio Nahe (FM)
- Radio Idar-Oberstein (FM)
- Radio Pirmasens (FM)
- Antenne Bad Kreuznach (FM)
- Antenne Kaiserslautern (FM)
- Antenne Pfalz (FM)
- Antenne Landau (FM)

=== Saarland ===
- Antenne West (FM, DAB)
- big FM Saarland (FM, DAB)
- Classic Rock Radio (FM, DAB)
- Radyo Metropol FM (DAB)
- Radio 99,6 (FM)
- Radio Salü (FM, DAB)
- roadRadio (DAB)
- Rockland Radio (DAB)
- RTL Radio (FM)

=== Saxony ===
==== Statewide radio stations ====
- apollo radio (FM)
- Energy Sachsen (FM)
- Hitradio RTL (FM)
- Radio PSR (FM)
- R.SA (FM)

==== Local radio stations ====
- Elsterwelle (FM)
- Radio Chemnitz (FM)
- Radio Dresden (FM)
- Radio Erzgebirge (FM)
- Radio Erzgebirge 107,7(FM)
- Radio Lausitz (FM)
- Radio Leipzig (FM)
- Radio WSW (FM)
- Radio Zwickau (FM)
- SAEK (FM)
- Vogtlandradio (FM)

=== Saxony-Anhalt ===
- Radio Brocken (FM)
- Radio SAW (FM, DAB)
- Rockland Sachsen-Anhalt (FM)
- 89.0 RTL (FM)

=== Schleswig-Holstein ===
- delta radio (FM)
- Radio NORA (FM)
- R.SH (FM)

=== Thuringia ===
- Antenne Thüringen (FM)
- Landeswelle Thüringen (FM)
- Radio TOP 40 (FM)

== Community radio ==
=== Baden-Württemberg ===
- bermuda.funk (FM)
- Freies Radio Freudenstadt (FM)
- Freies Radio für Stuttgart (FM)
- Freies Radio Wiesental (FM)
- helle welle (FM)
- Querfunk (FM)
- Radio Dreyeckland (FM)
- Radio fips (FM)
- Radio free FM (FM)
- Radio StHörfunk (FM)
- Radio Wellenbrecher (FM)
- Wüste Welle (FM)

=== Bavaria ===
- Camillo 92,9 (FM)
- Christliches Radio München (FM)
- LORA München (FM)
- Pray 92,9 (FM)
- Radio AREF (FM)
- Radio Feierwerk (FM)
- Radio Horeb (FM)
- Radio Meilensteine (FM)
- Radio Z (FM)

=== Berlin ===
- reboot.fm (FM)
- Offener Kanal Berlin (FM)

=== Bremen ===
- Radio Weser.TV (FM)

=== Hamburg ===
- Freies Sender Kombinat (FM)
- Tide 96,0 (FM)

=== Hesse ===
- Freies Radio Kassel (FM)
- Radio Darmstadt (FM)
- Radio Rheinwelle (FM)
- Radio Rüsselsheim (FM)
- Radio Unerhört Marburg (FM)
- Radio X (FM)
- RundFunk Meißner (FM)

=== Mecklenburg-Vorpommern ===
- LOHRO (FM)
- NB-Radiotreff 88.0 (FM)
- radio 98eins (FM)
- Welle Kummerower See (FM)

=== Lower Saxony ===
- Oldenburg eins (FM)
- osradio (FM)
- radio aktiv (FM)
- Radio Flora (FM)
- Radio Jade (FM)
- Radio Marabu (FM)
- Radio Okerwelle (FM)
- Radio Ostfriesland (FM)
- Radio Tonkuhle (FM)
- Radio Umland (FM)
- radioWSM (FM)
- Radio ZuSa (FM)
- StadtRadio Göttingen (FM)
- Sturmwellensender (FM)

=== Northrhine-Westphalia ===
- AJZ-Radiogruppe (FM)
- Antenne Bethel (FM)
- Bootbox Bielefeld (FM)
- Bürgerfunk im Bergischen Land (FM)
- Düsselwelle (FM)
- Freies Radio Paderborn (FM)
- Radio Joystick (FM)
- Radio MikroWelle (FM)
- Medienforum Münster (FM)
- Neue Essener Welle (FM)
- Radio Rosa Rauschen (FM)

=== Saxony ===
- 99drei Radio Mittweida (FM)
- coloRadio (FM)
- mephisto 97.6 (FM)
- Radio Blau (FM)
- Radio T (FM)

=== Saxony-Anhalt ===
- Radio Corax (FM)
- Radio HBW (FM)
- Freies Radio Naumburg (FM)

=== Schleswig-Holstein ===
- Freie RadioCooperative (FM)
- Offener Kanal Kiel/ Kiel FM (FM)
- Offener Kanal Lübeck (FM)
- Offener Kanal Westküste (FM)

=== Thuringia ===
- Radio F.R.E.I. (FM)
- Radio FunSWerk (FM)
- Radio hsf (FM)
- Radio Jena (FM)
- Radio Lotte (FM)
- Offener Kanal Nordhausen (FM)
- MAX-FM (FM)
- Wartburg-Radio (FM)

== Campus radio ==
=== Baden-Württemberg ===
- HoRadS, Stuttgart (FM)
- RadioAktiv, Mannheim und Heidelberg (FM)
- Radio Fri, Karlsruhe (FM)

=== Bavaria ===
- AFK M94.5 (FM)
- AFK max (FM)
- bit eXpress (DRM, DVB-H, DVB-T)
- FH-Campus Radio (DRM)
- Kanal C (FM)

=== Berlin and Brandenburg ===
- UniRadio Berlin-Brandenburg (FM)

=== Northrhine-Westphalia ===
- CampusFM (FM)
- CT das radio (FM)
- eldoradio* (FM)
- Hertz 87,9 (FM)
- Hochschulradio Aachen (FM)
- Hochschulradio Düsseldorf (FM)
- Kölncampus (FM)
- Radio 96,8 (FM)
- Radio Q (FM)
- Radio Triquency (FM)

=== Rhineland-Palatinate ===
- Radio SRRP (also: Schulradio Rheinland-Pfalz)

=== Saxony ===
- 99drei Radio Mittweida (FM)
- mephisto 97.6 (FM)

== Radio stations of armed forces in Germany ==
- American Forces Network (MW, FM, internet)
- British Forces Broadcasting Service (FM, internet)
- Radio Forces Françaises de Berlin (FM)

== Foreign radio stations broadcast in Germany ==
- BBC World Service (FM)
- Radio France Internationale (FM)
- Radio Free Europe (SW)
- (RadioRFM Home of African Music) www.cradior.com

== See also ==
- Media of Germany
