= Bremen TV tower =

Coordinates: 53°05′45″N 8°47′31″E

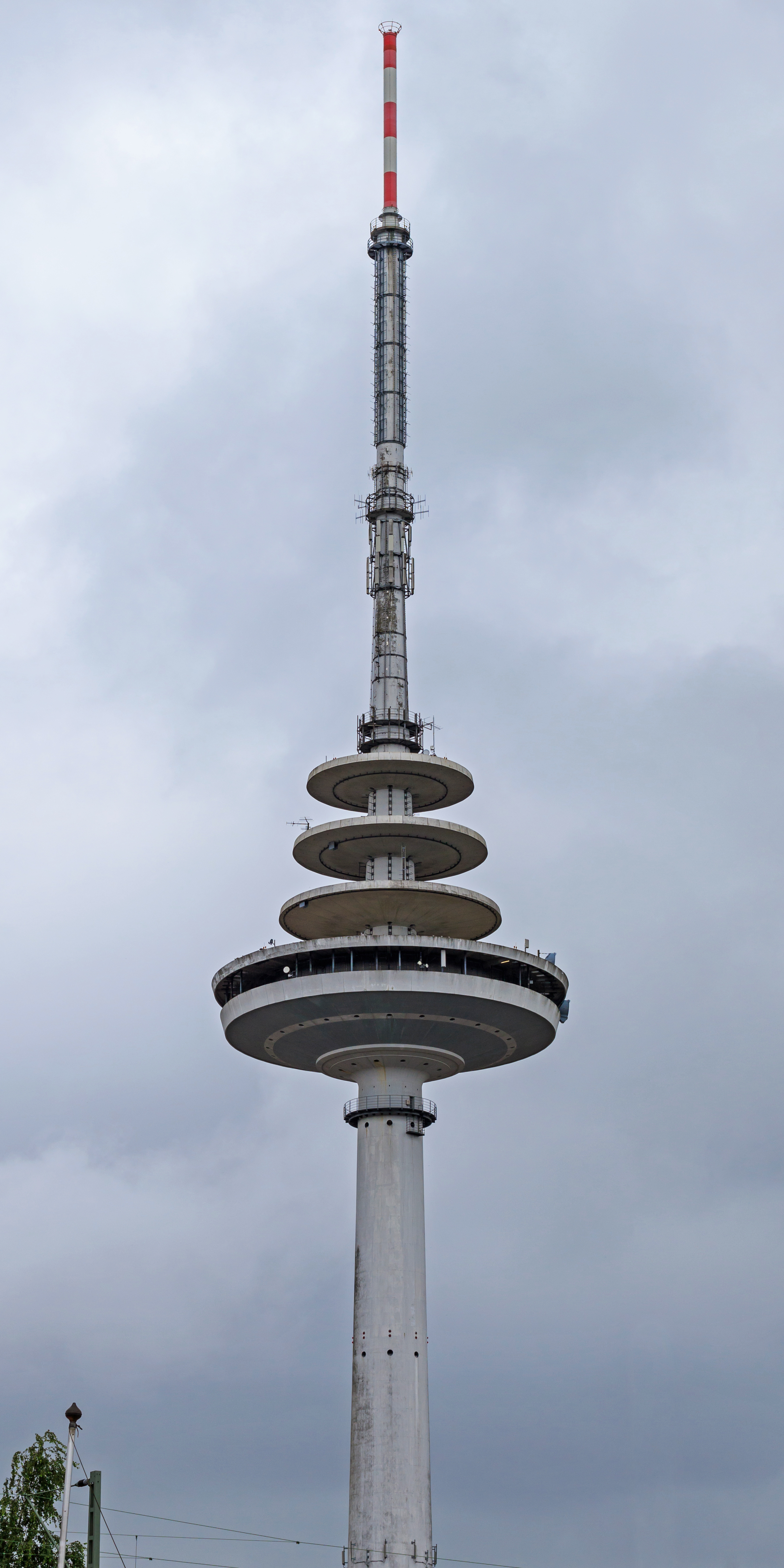
Bremen-Walle Telecommunication Tower

Bremen-Walle Telecommunication Tower (official designation of Bremen TV tower), which is not accessible for the public, is, like the telecommunication tower at Münster and the Friedrich-Clemens-Gerke Tower in Cuxhaven, a reproduction of the telecommunication tower Kiel. It is 235.70 meters high. The diameter of the operating pulpit, which is 108.20 meters above ground, is 40 meters. The telecommunication tower is located in the Bremen quarter Walle at the Utbremer road, about 2.5 kilometers northwest from the city center (market place with city hall, pc. Petri cathedral, Roland and the city musicians of Bremen). All FM-radio and TV programs of radio Bremen in Bremen are transmitted today from this tower. A 70 cm amateur radio repeater, DB0OZ, with an output frequency of 438.820 MHz, is also located on the tower.

In 2000, installing a restaurant in the operating pulpit was considered, but these plans were once again rejected.

== Transmitted programmes ==
=== FM ===
Programme	Frequency	ERP
Bremen Zwei	88.3 MHz	100 kW
Energy Bremen	89.8 MHz	1 kW
Radio Weser.TV Bremen	92.5 MHz	0.2 kW
Bremen Eins	93.8 MHz	100 kW
NDR Info / Bremen Fünf (Parlamentsradio)	95.0 MHz	1 kW
COSMO	95.6 MHz	0.2 kW
Radio Roland	96.1 MHz	0.2 kW
Bremen Next	96.7 MHz	50 kW
Radyo Metropol FM	97.2 MHz	0.5 kW
Deutschlandfunk Kultur	100.3 MHz	1 kW
Bremen Vier	101.2 MHz	100 kW
Radio Teddy	104.8 MHz	0.1 kW
Deutschlandfunk	107.1 MHz	100 kW
Radio 21	107.6 MHZ	0.2 kW

=== DAB+ ===
Block	Programme
5C DR Deutschland (D__00188)	Dlf (104 kbps); Dlf Kultur (112 kbps); Dlf Nova (104 kbps); DRadio DokDeb (48 kbps); Energy Digital (72 kbps); ERF Plus (64 kbps); Klassik Radio (72 kbps); Radio Bob (72 kbps); Radio Horeb (48 kbps); Radio Schlagerparadies (64 kbps); Schwarzwaldradio (64 kbps); sunshine live (72 kbps); DRadio Daten (32 kbps data); EPG Deutschland (16 kbps data); TPEG (16 kbps data); TPEG_MM (16 kbps data)
5D Antenne DE (D__00364)	80s80s (72 kbps); 90s90s (72 kbps); Absolut Bella (72 kbps); Absolut Germany (72 kbps); Absolut HOT (72 kbps); Absolut Oldie (72 kbps); Absolut TOP (72 kbps); AIDAradio (72 kbps); Ballermann Radio (72 kbps); Beats Radio (72 kbps); Brillux Radio (72 kbps); Nostalgie (72 kbps); Oldie Antenne (72 kbps); RTL Radio (72 kbps); Rock Antenne (72 kbps); Toggo Radio (72 kbps)
6A Bremen K6A (D__00389)	Antenne Schlager (72 kbps); bigFM (72 kbps); Energy Bremen (72 kbps); Star FM Maximum Rock (72 kbps); Oldie Antenne (72 kbps); Radio 21 (72 kbps); radio ffn (HB/OL) (72 kbps); Radio Nordseewelle (WHV) (72 kbps); Radio Roland (72 kbps); Radio Weser.TV HB (72 kbps); Radio Weser.TV BHV (72 kbps); The Wolf Bremen (72 kbps)
6D Radio Bremen (D__00294)	Bremen Eins (128 kbps); Bremen Zwei (128 kbps); COSMO (112 kbps); Bremen Vier (128 kbps); Bremen Next (128 kbps); Die Maus (96 kbps)
8D NDR NDS OL (D__00423)	NDR 1 NDS (Oldenburg) (104 kbps); NDR 2 (Lower Saxony) (104 kbps); NDR Kultur (104 kbps); NDR Info (Lower Saxony) (104 kbps); N-Joy (104 kbps); NDR Blue (104 kbps); NDR Schlager (104 kbps); NDR Info Spezial (104 kbps); NDR BWS (16 kbps); ARD TPEG (16 kbps)

=== TV (DVB-T2) ===
All private programmes are broadcast encrypted via freenet TV, except where noted.

Channel	Frequency	Programmes
22	482 MHz	WELT HD; DMAX HD; Eurosport1 HD; Disney Channel HD; nick HD / CC +1 HD; Comedy Central HD; bibel.TV (Note: Free-to-air programme in an encrypted block); QVC; QVC 2; HSE24; 1-2-3.tv
29	538 MHz	Das Erste HD; phoenix HD; arte HD; tagesschau24 HD; one HD; Radio: NDR Blue; NDR Info Spezial; NDR Kultur; NDR Schlager
30	546 MHz	NDR Fernsehen HD (Lower Saxony); WDR Fernsehen HD (Cologne); hr-Fernsehen HD (Note: Broadcasting NDR Fernsehen (Hamburg) at regional times); mdr Fernsehen HD (Saxony-Anhalt) (Note: Broadcasting NDR Fernsehen (Mecklenburg-Vorpommern) at regional times); BR Fernsehen HD (South) (Note: Broadcasting NDR Fernsehen (Schleswig-Holstein) at regional times); Radio: N-Joy; NDR 1 NDS (Hanover); NDR 2; NDR Info
35	586 MHz	ZDF HD; 3sat HD; KiKa HD; ZDFneo HD; ZDFinfo HD; freenet TV connect (Note: HbbTV service with multiple streams, HbbTV v1.5 required)
42	642 MHz	RTL HD (Lower Saxony/Bremen); RTL Zwei HD; Super RTL HD; VOX HD; n-tv HD; NITRO HD; Tele 5 HD
46	674 MHz	Radio Bremen TV HD
48	690 MHz	kabel eins HD; ProSieben HD; Sat.1 HD (Niedersachsen/Bremen); ProSieben Maxx HD; Sat.1 Gold HD; sixx HD; sport1 HD

== See also ==
- List of amateur radio repeater sites in Germany
- List of towers
