= List of amateur radio repeater sites =

This is a list of repeater sites for amateur radio in Germany.

It includes towers (e.g. CN Tower and Bremen TV tower), hills, mountains and other locations.

== List ==
- Bachtel
- Brandenkopf
- Bremen TV tower
- Brocken Transmitter
- Čerchov
- CN Tower
- Darmstadt University of Applied Sciences
- Dobl Transmitter
- Ellerspring
- Europaturm
- Feldberg/Taunus transmitter
- Fernmeldeturm Koblenz
- Fernmeldeturm Münster
- Fernmeldeturm Nürnberg
- Fronalpstock
- Funkturm Berlin
- Gartow-Höhbeck transmitter
- Gehrenberg
- Geissleite
- Heubach Telecommunication Tower
- Hohneck (Vosges)
- Hörnli
- Hünenburg Telecommunication Tower
- Kahlheid
- Köterberg
- Melibokus
- Mittagberg
- Olympiaturm
- Petit Ballon
- Potzbergturm
- Rheinsender
- Rigi
- Schmausenbuck
- Schneeberg (Fichtel Mountains)
- Schwerin TV tower
- Sender Inselsberg
- Signal de Botrange
- Sint-Pieters-Leeuw Tower
- Stöcklewald
- Telecom Telecommunication Tower Heidelberg
- Volkmarsberg
- Wasserkuppe
- Wurmberg (Harz)
- Zugspitze

== See also ==
- Deutscher Amateur-Radio-Club
