= Big FM =

Big FM may refer to:

- Big FM (Indian radio station)
- Big FM (German radio station)
- Big 106.2 (Big FM), a defunct Auckland, New Zealand radio station
