= Radio in Germany =

There are over 500 radio stations in Germany. Radio stations are licensed by media authorities in individual states, a result of Germany's federal structure.

For a comprehensive overview, see List of radio stations in Germany.

== Public broadcasting ==
There are three nationwide public radio stations.

- Deutschlandfunk broadcasts news and background stories on current affairs.
- Deutschlandfunk Kultur mostly broadcasts cultural programs.

Both Deutschlandfunk and Deutschlandfunk Kultur are available in many areas on FM and nationwide on DAB+.

- Deutschlandfunk Nova A digital-only station which mainly broadcasts science and technology stories in 10-15 minute sections is available nationally on DAB+.

Other public radio stations, run by local public broadcasters are generally only available in the states which those broadcasters operate. All statewide radio stations broadcast free-to-air via the Astra 19.2°E satellite.

== Commercial radio ==
A few commercial radio stations have broader coverage thanks to multiple licenses from different states.

- Klassik Radio broadcasts classical music, and is available in metropolitan areas on FM.
- ERF Radio is a Christian radio station available nationwide on DAB+ and with satellite broadcasting. Ceased broadcasting on AM in 2010. Worldwide, it is available on www.erf.de.
- domradio is another Christian radio station available in Cologne and Fulda on FM.
- sunshine live is an electronic music featuring Dance, House, Techno and Trance. It is available in the north of Baden-Württemberg and also in the city of Templin, Brandenburg.

The individual states have different rules and regulations related to licensing commercial radio stations. Commercial radio stations, in most cases, try to cover the entire state they are licensed in, though some restrict themselves to metropolitan areas.

== Community radio ==
Community radio is non-commercial radio produced by volunteers. In most cases, it covers only a single city.

== Digital radio ==
On 1st August 2011 Germany broadcast digital radio services on a DAB+ nationwide multiplex. 14 new stations from a football programme, to rock, pop, classical, talk and Christian radio can now be heard across Germany and with the national multiplex being shared between both public and private broadcasters it is expected that the new stations on air will increase in number in the very near future.

The German Digital Radio project office (Deutschland Digital Radio) was created to co-ordinate the efforts of all stakeholders on the national multiplex, the public broadcasters (ARD) and Deutschland Radio.

The network operator, Media Broadcast, has 27 transmitters on-air in the first stage covering all major cities and autobahns, and plans for coverage of up to 99% in some areas are due by 2014.

Germany’s public service financing committee, the KEF provided funding to facilitate the roll out of national DAB+ digital radio in Germany. The funds, which allowed public broadcaster Deutschland Radio, to build out a national digital radio network using DAB+ technology, were made available for the industry by the KEF.

== See also ==
- List of radio stations in Germany
- Media of Germany
