= Radio Bremen 2 =

German radio station (1952–2001)

Germany
- Broadcast area: Bremen

Programming
- Language: German

Ownership
- Operator: Radio Bremen (RB)

History
- First air date: 13 April 1952
- Last air date: 31 October 2001

Radio Bremen 2 was a German public radio station, owned and operated by Radio Bremen (RB). It used to broadcast a culture and information-based format, featuring classical and modern music.

It was replaced by Nordwestradio on 1 November 2001 (which itself relaunched as Bremen Zwei in 2017).
