= ARD Sounds =

Audio portal for two German radio stations

- Developer: ARD
- Release: 8 November 2017
- Platform: Web, iOS, Android
- Available in: German
- Type: Audio streaming service
- Website: www.ardsounds.de

ARD Sounds (until March 2026: ARD Audiothek) is the joint audio portal of the state broadcasting stations of the ARD and Deutschlandradio on the Internet. The service was officially launched as a mobile app on November 8, 2017, on the occasion of the ARD Radio Play Days in Karlsruhe. A beta web version has also been available since November 2018; it replaces the radio features in the ARD Mediathek, which has since offered only video content. Editorial support for the ARD Audiothek is provided by the ARD, the online editorial team in Mainz.

In April 2018, the ARD Audiothek won the German Digital Award in silver in the category "Mobile Apps - User Experience / Usability". Within a year, the mobile app version had been installed more than 510,000 times and had around 21 million audio views. The Android app recorded more than 100,000 downloads in October 2019, according to the Google Play Store.
