= Hansawelle =

Former radio station in Germany

Germany
- Broadcast area: Bremen

Programming
- Language: German

Ownership
- Operator: Radio Bremen (RB)

History
- First air date: 1946
- Last air date: 30 April 2001
- Former frequencies: FM: 93.8 MHz (Bremen); 89.3 MHz (Bremerhaven); AM: 936 kHz

Hansawelle (Radio Bremen 1 – Hansawelle) was a German public radio station owned and operated by Radio Bremen (RB) from 1946 until 30 April 2001. Until 1952 it was Radio Bremen's only channel.

In the 1960s the channel had a high musical content. Especially after Radio Bremen 4 was changed to be a channel with mass appeal, from 1992 Hansawelle was focused more strongly towards its target audience, with a variety of genres of music.

As Norddeutscher Rundfunk was not permitted to broadcast advertising on its radio channels until 1981, Hansawelle provided the most radio advertising in North Germany until that year.

The channel was broadcast by two VHF transmitters: Bremen (93.8 MHz) and Bremerhaven (89.3 MHz). On 30 April 2001 the channel was discontinued for financial reasons, and amalgamated with Radio Bremen Melodie to form a new channel, Bremen Eins.
