= Sportblitz =

Sports television programme of Radio Bremen

- Genre: Sports programme
- Created by: Jörg Wontorra
- Country of origin: Germany
- Original language: German

Production
- Production locations: Bremen, Germany
- Running time: 7 min

Original release
- Network: Radio Bremen TV
- Release: 1 November 1994 – present

Sportblitz is the sports television programme of Radio Bremen, the smallest state broadcasting station in the German ARD network. It is broadcast weekdays at 6:06 p.m. (until September 2013 at 7:15 p.m., previously also aired at 6:35 p.m.) on Radio Bremen TV, which is unique in the ARD media landscape in terms of frequency. The concept was developed in 1990 by Jörg Wontorra, the station's sports director at the time. From 1990 to 1992, the sportblitz was already being experimented with, with changing broadcast lengths, at that time still in the first programme of the ARD (today's Das Erste), where buten un binnen was also at home. The programme returned on 1 November 1994 at 6:35 p.m. after a two-year break - at the same time when the regional programme of Radio Bremen moved from the first to the third programme.

After one year of planning, the programme was restructured and was given new broadcasting times and a new studio set as of 1 September 2013.

In terms of content, the programme covers sports events in Bremen and Bremerhaven - usually an interview guest is invited. Most topics are Werder Bremen and basketball (Eisbären Bremerhaven)/ice hockey (Fischtown Pinguins Bremerhaven) related.

== Hosts ==
- Janna Betten
- Jan-Dirk Bruns
- Ludwig Evertz
- Pascale Ciesla
- Stephan Schiffner
- Niko Schleicher
- Jenny Stadelmann
