= Radio Bremen Melodie =

- Mehr Musik! Mehr Melodie! (More music! More melody!)

Germany
- Broadcast area: Bremen

Programming
- Language: German

Ownership
- Operator: Radio Bremen (RB)

History
- First air date: 1 November 1964
- Last air date: 30 April 2001
- Former names: Radio Bremen Drei
- Former frequencies: 96.7 MHz (Bremen); 95.4 MHz (Bremerhaven)

Radio Bremen Melodie (Radio Bremen 3 – Melodie) was a German, public radio station owned and operated by the Radio Bremen (RB). It broadcast an information and entertainment programme, dominated by German schlager music.

The channel was broadcast by two VHF transmitters: Bremen (96.7 MHz) and Bremerhaven (95.4 MHz). On 30 April 2001 the channel was discontinued for financial reasons, and amalgamated with Hansawelle to form a new channel, Bremen Eins.
