= Mediumwave transmitter Bremen =

Coordinates: 53°06′31″N 8°56′10″E

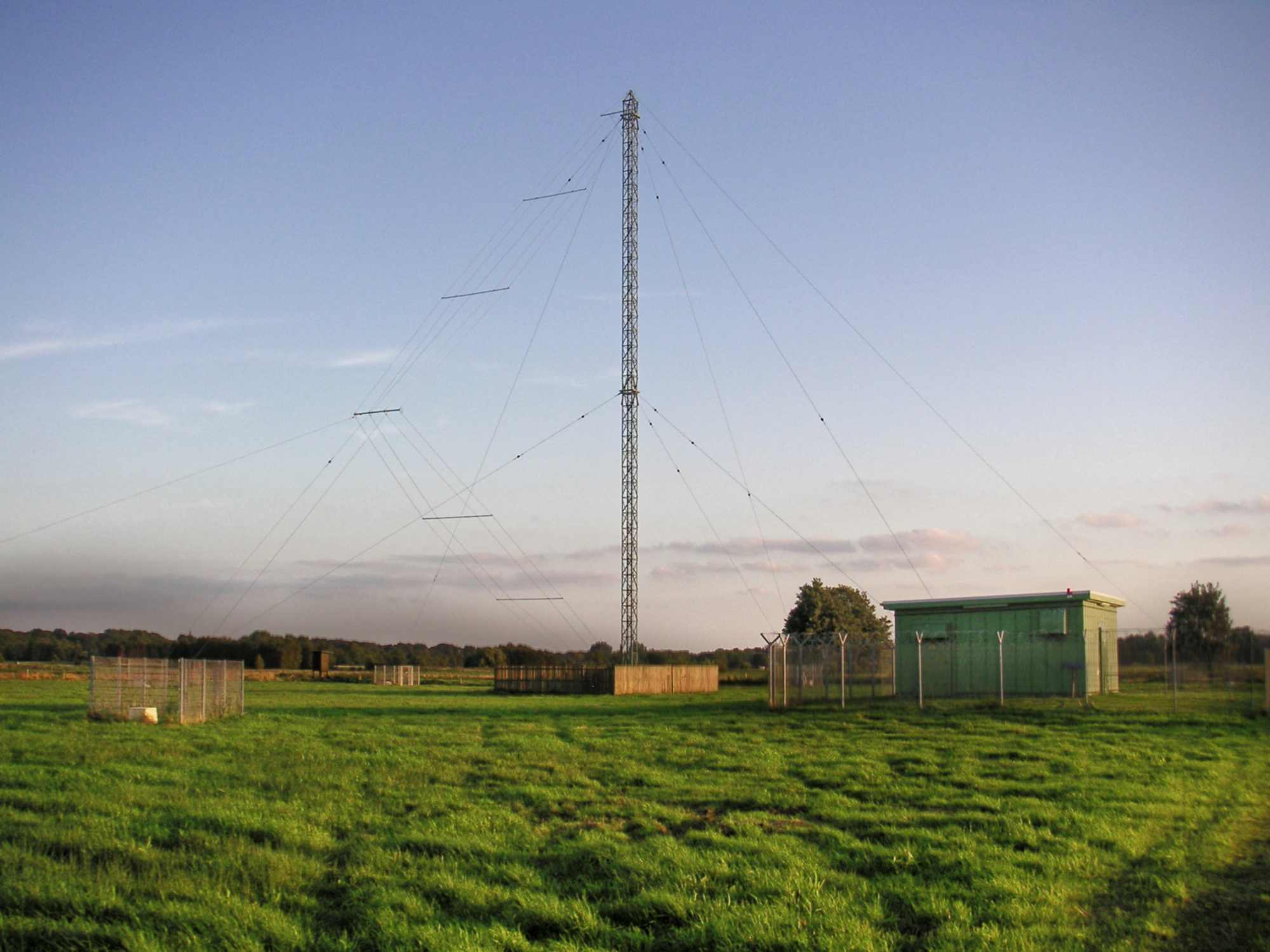
Mittelwellensender Bremen-Oberneuland 2

The Mediumwave Transmitter Bremen was the mediumwave broadcasting facility of Radio Bremen situated at Bremen-Oberneuland, Germany. It operated at 936 kHz, with a transmitter output power of 50 kW. The transmitter at Bremen-Oberneuland was built in 1999 as a replacement for the old transmission facility of Radio Bremen at Leher Feld, which was demolished to make room for an industrial area.

== History ==
The transmitter station was built when Radio Bremen was established in 1950. Founded by an US-American donation on October 15, 1951, the 20 kW of Radio Bremen Radio Bremen at Leher Feld got on air. To avoid of interferences with a transmitter in Tirana on the same frequency the transmission to the south-east was mantled. In 1999 the new, but smaller transmitter close to the Wümme bog grassland was built.

The mediumwave transmitter Bremen was the only transmitter owned by Radio Bremen — all other transmitters now used by Radio Bremen are the property of Deutsche Telekom — used a cage aerial, mounted on a 45-metre (146 feet) high, grounded, guyed lattice steel mast. This aerial had a high gain of 4.5 dB, which means that the 50 kW transmitter feeding it produced the same effect as a 140 kW transmitter feeding an antenna with a gain of 1 dB.

The broadcasts from this transmitter reached all northern Germany during daylight, except the most eastern areas. At night it covered all of Europe, although a transmitter operating at the same frequency in Lviv, Ukraine often interfered with it. In 2006 the aerial mast got a new coat of paint.

Due to financial difficulties, Radio Bremen switched off the transmitter in March 2010 "temporarily" and dismantled it in 2014 after only 200 people voiced their protest.

== See also ==
- List of masts
- Germany
