= Deutscher Amateur-Radio-Club =

German amateur radio organization

- Abbreviation: DARC
- Formation: 1950
- Type: Non-profit organization
- Purpose: Advocacy, Education
- Location(s): Baunatal, Hesse, Germany; JO41rg
- Region served: Germany
- Members: 32,819 (2021-01-01)
- Official language: German
- President: Christian Entsfellner, DL3MBG
- Affiliations: International Amateur Radio Union
- Website: http://www.darc.de

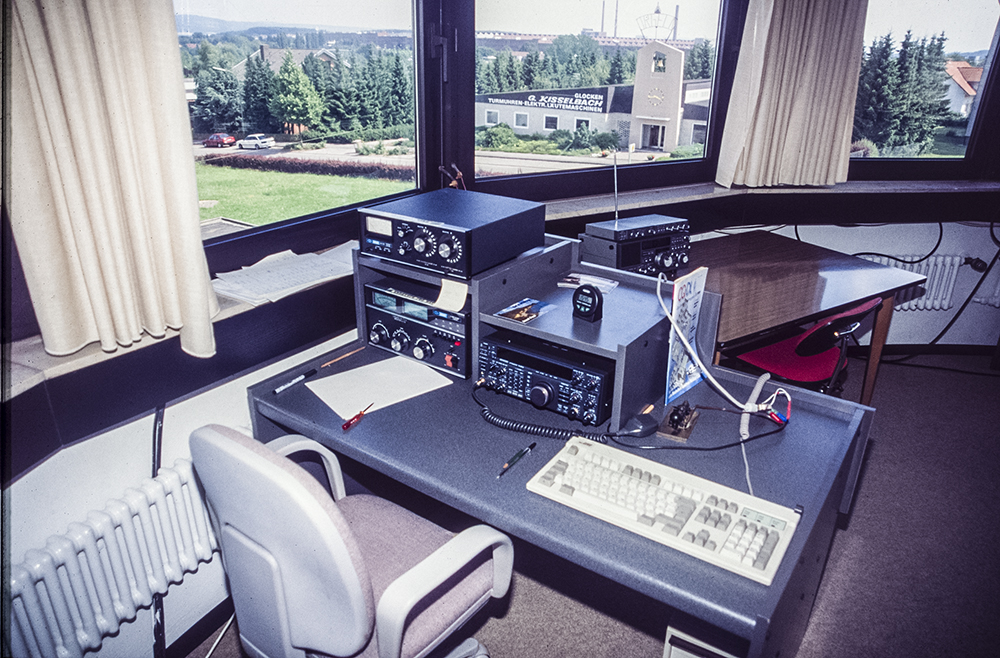
The headquarters station of the German organization of radio amateurs - Deutscher Amateur-Radio-Club

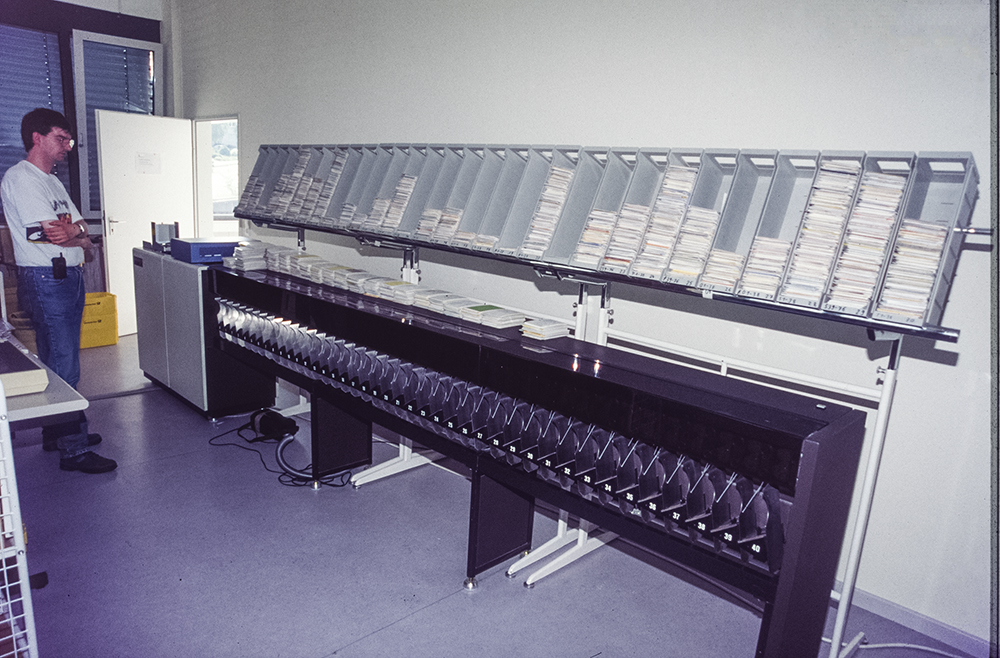
The QSL cards sorting machine deployed at the DARC Amateur Radio organization in Germany.

The Deutscher Amateur Radio Club e.V. (DARC) (in English, German Amateur Radio Club) is a national non-profit organization for amateur radio enthusiasts in Germany. As of 9 July 2019, the organization had 34,009 members, approximately 53% of all licensed amateur radio operators in Germany. Key membership benefits of the organization include QSL bureau services, a monthly membership magazine called CQ DL, and the promotion and sponsorship of radio contests. DARC promotes amateur radio by organizing classes and technical support to help enthusiasts earn their amateur radio license. The DARC also represents the interests of German amateur radio operators and shortwave listeners before German and international telecommunications regulatory authorities. DARC is the national member society representing Germany in the International Amateur Radio Union.

== See also ==
- International Amateur Radio Union
- List of amateur radio repeater sites in Germany
