= Nordwestradio =

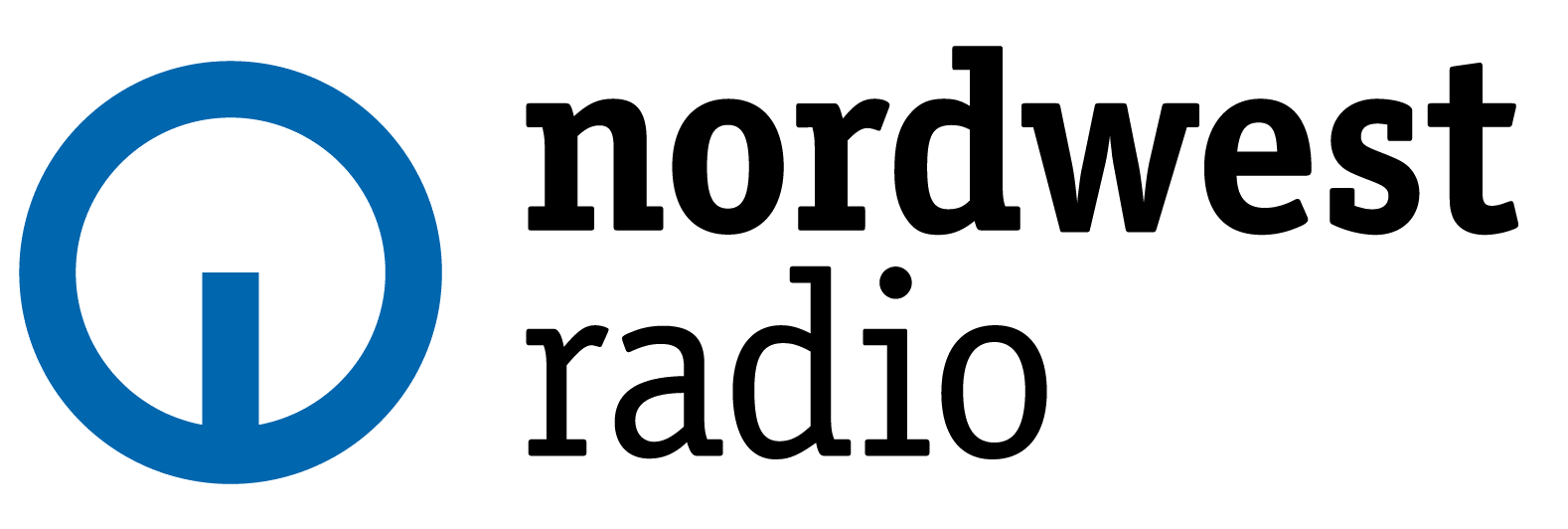
- Alles Gute für die Ohren (Everything good for the ears)

Germany
- Broadcast area: Bremen

Programming
- Language: German

Ownership
- Operator: Radio Bremen (RB); Norddeutscher Rundfunk (NDR, until 2016)

History
- First air date: 1 November 2001
- Last air date: 11 August 2017
- Former frequencies: 88.5 MHz (Bremen); 95.4 MHz (Bremerhaven)

Nordwestradio was a German, public radio station owned and co-operated by Radio Bremen (RB) and Norddeutscher Rundfunk (NDR). It used to broadcast a culture and information-based format. The station's music was dominated by singer-songwriters, pop and soul outside of the mainstream. Nordwestradio also played classical music, rock, jazz and blues, especially in the evenings and at weekends.

Nordwestradio replaced Radio Bremen 2 on 1 November 2001. It was replaced by Bremen Zwei on 11 August 2017.
