= LOHRO =

Coordinates: 54.0909778°N 12.1231268°E

- Rostock; Germany
- Frequency: 90.2 MHz

Programming
- Language: German

Ownership
- Owner: Kulturnetzwerk e.V.

History
- First air date: 1 July 2005

Links
- Webcast: webplayer.lohro.de
- Website: lohro.de

LOHRO is an acronym for the local radio station of the Hanseatic City of Rostock. LOHRO is a member of the German Federal Association of Free Radios (BFR). The radio station is maintained by two associations: Kulturnetzwerk e.V. acts as license holder and foerderverein. LOHRO supports the radio station and organizes trainings. The radio station raises money for operations through project funds from several organizations, membership fees from associations, and sponsorships.

LOHRO was designed to give people of different ages, backgrounds, and abilities the opportunity to participate in producing and broadcasting radio programs. The station relies on many volunteers and staff who work in different editorial departments. These departments cover various music genres and topics, such as environmental issues, literature, politics, and cross-cultural dialogue. The association offers training and workshops to promote media production skills and social engagement. This reflects the organization's broader focus on supporting cultural participation and media literacy in the Rostock region.

== History ==
After repeated trial operations, such as at the local Hanse Sail festival, LOHRO started airing around the clock on July 1, 2005. The programme was licensed as a pilot project until 2010. The Media Analysis Committee of the state of Mecklenburg-Western Pomerania authorized Kulturnetzwerk e.V. as a broadcaster according to its Broadcasting Act (RundfG MV) on June 30, 2010. Thereby, the existing frequency was extended to LOHRO for ten more years, effective as of January 1, 2011.

== Program ==
A relatively fixed schedule contains daily, weekly, and monthly radio shows.

== Organization and Governance ==
Kulturnetzwerk e.V. holds the legal broadcasting license for LOHRO and serves as the primary administrative body for the station. The association manages core organizational functions, including regulatory compliance with broadcasting requirements, financial administration, and coordination of volunteer staff. In addition to licensing responsibilities, Kulturnetzwerk e.V. produces reports, press releases, and annual reviews that document the station's activities, programming decisions, and community engagement activities. These publications provide public documentation of the organization's work and its involvement in media education, cultural programming, and local projects in Rostock.

== Regulatory Framework ==
The technical aspects of radio broadcasting in Germany are managed by the Bundesnetzagentur (Federal Network Agency for Electricity, Gas, Telecommunications, Post and Railway). Under German telecommunications law, this agency is responsible for allocating radio frequencies, assigning spectrum resources for broadcasting applications, and ensuring that broadcasting stations do not interfere with one another. The agency creates frequency usage plans, assigns frequencies to qualified broadcasters, and works with state media authorities to meet coverage requirements, which are set by law. Although the Bundesnetzagentur does not regulate program content, its management of the radio spectrum provides the technical foundation that allows non-commercial stations like LOHRO to broadcast on assigned FM and digital frequencies within the established regulatory framework.

== See also ==
- List of radio stations in Germany
