= CQ DL =

German amateur radio magazine

- Chefredakteur: Stefan Hüpper, DH5FFL
- Categories: Amateur radio
- Frequency: Monthly
- Circulation: 34,000
- Publisher: Deutscher Amateur-Radio-Club
- First issue: 1972 (1927)
- Country: Germany
- Language: German
- Website: https://www.darc.de
- ISSN: 0178-269X

CQ DL is a monthly amateur radio enthusiast magazine published in Germany. The CQ DL is published by the Deutschen Amateur-Radio-Club (DARC). Every DARC-member receives a free subscription.

In addition to news in the field of amateur radio, test reports and construction instructions, especially for antennas and additional equipment, are published. Furthermore, there are articles on theoretical aspects of amateur radio, including radio operating instructions and related topics, including computer technology.

Since 2013 the CQ DL also is available for downloading for current members.

== History ==
Immediately after the Second World War, two magazines were founded: QRV Amateur Radio (published by Körner-Verlag) and, as a re-establishment, the magazine CQ, a publication of the German Radio Association (DARC). With the founding of a united amateur radio club for all of West Germany (the DARC)—until September 1950, there had been independent DARC associations in the individual occupation zones—the two amateur radio magazines QRV Amateur Radio and CQ were merged into a single publication, under the new name Das DL-QTC.

The DL-QTC was published in this form until 1971. After that, the two went their separate ways again, and the DARC published its amateur radio magazine under the name cq-DL—which has been published since 1972—until today under the slightly modified title CQ DL.
