= ColoRadio =

German community radio station

Coordinates: 51.069°N 13.750°E

coloRadio is a non-commercial self-managed community radio station in Dresden, Germany, operated by Radio-Initiative Dresden e.V., a registered association. coloRadio has been transmitting since 8 July 1993. Since 1 March 2007, it has broadcast on 2 weak frequencies, 50 and 100 watts, or via the internet livestream, from Monday to Friday 6 to 11 p.m. CET as well as Saturday and Sunday from noon to midnight, 49 hours a week, on 98.4 and 99.3 MHz. The station's content is divided into four main groups: magazines, music, politics and art and culture. Most programmes on the station are broadcast monthly and are in German, but some broadcasts are also in other languages such as English, Czech, Spanish and Chinese. Decisions are made by a plenum, which is made up of broadcasters and association members. There is no role similar to that of a chief editor at the station. The station is staffed by volunteers, in part to ensure editorial independence. coloRadio is considered to beemancipatory radio. coloRadio is a member of the "Bundesverbandes Freier Radios" in Germany. The monthly journal of the station is called "Transmitter". Like fellow Saxon community radio stations "Radio Blau" in Leipzig and "Radio T" in Chemnitz, coloRadio was taken off FM by the Media Broadcast from 17 April to 13 May 2010 because of a dispute over transmission costs.
