= ERF Medien =

German media corporation

Evangeliums Rundfunk (ERF)
- Founded: 1959
- Type: Evangelical Media Distributor
- Region served: Germany, European countries
- Key people: Susanne Thyroff, president
- Website: erf.de

ERF Medien e. V. (German: Evangeliumsrundfunk) is a German evangelical media corporation, based in Wetzlar, Hesse. The Corporation is producing Radio- and TV programs as well as online content with Christian-evangelical messages. The organization was founded in 1959 as Evangeliums-Rundfunk (ERF) (gospel broadcast). Theologically, ERF Medien is close to the Evangelical Alliance in Germany. ERF is partner of Trans World Radio.

The funding is almost exclusively through donations from listeners, viewers, online users and friends with annual revenues of 17.3 million euros (as of 2018). In addition, there is an ERF Foundation since 2001, whose statutory purpose is to provide financial support to the broadcaster.

== Program and distribution ==
ERF produces ten foreign-language radio programs for the German-speaking region.

The TV program ERF1 is the main TV program.

=== Distribution ===
ERF distributes its programs via a variety of digital channels, primarily through the internet, digital radio (DAB+), as well as via satellite and cable.

- Satellite: The radio program is broadcast digitally via the Astra satellite system and can be received on various digital cable networks (e.g., Vodafone, PŸUR).
- Partner stations: Some programs and ministries of ERF are broacasted by Bibel TV and ANIXE+.
- DAB+: In Germany, ERF Plus is broadcast nationwide via the so-called "national multiplex" (Bundesmux) on channel 5C. In Switzerland, it is also distributed via DAB+.
- App: Via the in-house "ERF Plus" app as well as through platforms such as the Radioplayer. ERF is also distributed via voice assistants such as Alexa as well as through smart TV apps.

ERF1-TV is distributed via Satellite (DVB-S at Astra 1M), Live-stream and since 1 April 2009 also in some digital cable networks in Germany (DVB-C).

== Network ==
ERF has a close media partnership with the missionary campaign ProChrist and the evangelical Christian Media Foundation (SCM).

== History ==
In Tangier, Morocco, the German missionary Helmut Gärtner came into contact with US missionaries who had been conducting radio missions for some time. He was responsible for the German Christians in Spain and agreed to establish a German-speaking department for the US missionaries. Thus, starting in 1956, broadcasts from Tangier also began in German. In October 1959, at Gärtner's instigation, a German branch was founded in Wetzlar, central Hesse, under the name "Evangeliums-Rundfunk" (ERF).

The first broadcast was originally scheduled for the summer of 1960. Trans World Radio was broadcasting from the transmitter facilities previously built by the Nazis on Mount Agel in Monte Carlo. A medium wave transmitter was added in 1964. However, technical difficulties meant that the broadcast launch had to be postponed several times. On February 5, 1961, the ERF went on air via the shortwave transmitter of TWR Monte Carlo. From 1964, the ERF also broadcast from Monte Carlo to Germany via medium wave. Key figures in the early years were theologian Walter Quiring and journalist Horst Marquardt. Marquardt headed the ERF until 1993.

In 1995, the ERF received its first license for private broadcasting in Hesse, allowing it to broadcast nationwide on medium wave.

The ERF Foundation, founded in 2001, supports the work financially.

Two long-standing employees of the ERF in Wetzlar informed the company's management that a division head had a criminal past (involving sexual misconduct and embezzlement). In response, the broadcaster dismissed both employees. They challenged their termination in court and won their case in 2018.

In addition to producing radio programs, the ERF launched its own television program in 1979.
