= Radio Bremen TV =

Regional public service television channel

- Country: Germany
- Broadcast area: Germany, also distributed nationally in: Austria; Switzerland; Liechtenstein; Luxembourg; Netherlands; Belgium
- Network: ARD
- Headquarters: Bremen, Germany

Programming
- Language(s): German
- Picture format: 576i (16:9 SDTV); 720p (DVB-S2) (HDTV); 1080p (DVB-T2 only) (HDTV)

Ownership
- Owner: Radio Bremen (RB)

History
- Launched: 1 January 2005; 20 years ago

Links
- Website: www.radiobremen.de/fernsehen

Availability

Streaming media
- Radio Bremen TV Livestream: Watch Live

Radio Bremen TV is a regional public service television channel owned and operated by Radio Bremen (RB) and serving Bremen, Germany. It is one of seven regional "third programs". The name reflects the fact these programs all came into existence after the Second German Channel was founded in 1961. They are organized within the federal network ARD.

== History ==
Germany's first regional television broadcast occurred on 4 January 1965, in northern Germany, as part of a network involving Norddeutscher Rundfunk, Sender Freies Berlin (West Berlin) and Radio Bremen. This association marks the birth of NDR Fernsehen, a television channel covering a large part of the northern Bundesländer (Schleswig-Holstein, Lower Saxony, Mecklenburg-Vorpommern, Hamburg and Bremen).

On 1 January 2005, NDR Fernsehen's regional broadcasts for Bremen and Bremerhaven acquired their own identity, birthing Radio Bremen TV, a television channel that took over parts of NDR Fernsehen (with which it continues its association) in addition to local productions.

== Programming ==
The weather forecast started at 18:10 and was followed by NDR Fernsehen, which ran from 18:15 to 18:45. This was followed by AnSichten, a new edition of Stadtschnack, which covered current news and events relevant to Bremen. On Fridays, a weekly quiz show, Sieh an, was broadcast and followed at 18:55 by a short news bulletin accompanied with sign language and produced by the buten un binnen editorial team.

At 19:00, Nordländer, a factual program covered interesting contributions or featured contributors relevant to the Northern German regions. The program was also set for broadcast within the NDR transmission range, the station's regional neighbour and affiliate. It aired only between Mondays and Thursdays, with its Friday time slot instead filled by Bremer Tierladen, a program covering animal issues. Sportblitz came next on the weekday schedule and would begin at 19:15, followed by another weather report at 19:25. After this, buten un binnen, the magazine show covering Bremen and Bremerhaven, would begin each day at 19:30.

On the weekends, regional programming was only set to start at 18:45. On Saturdays, a broadcast chosen from the archives of Radio Bremen filled the first, early evening slot in the schedule, running until 19:30 when the latest edition of buten un binnen would follow. On Sundays, 3 nach 9 classics would commence regional programming during the day's 18:45 slot, consisting of highlights or Best-of selections from the substantial archives of 3 nach 9, Radio Bremen's flag-ship, a long-running talk show which has been aired for the last 35 years now. A new episode of buten un binnen - Das Beste followed every Sunday at 19:30, each episode themed around a new subject or issue that is examined through a collection of segments, clips and contributions from archival material covering the show's entire 30-year history and edited because of the relevance they have to the theme of the week, along with contributing to its exploration or discussion. The Sunday edition of buten un binnen itself, meanwhile, was recorded the previous day and could therefore not cover or react to events or news from the day set for its actual broadcast.

Starting in September 2013, Radio Bremen TV's programming received an overhaul while the station was undergoing its own reconstitution. A result of this was that the space reserved for independent regional television broadcasts was made shorter to bring it into line with the equivalent space provided for NDR's regional stations. Following this change and now receiving less time on air, the station had to discontinue a number of programs in order to reorganize its schedule to suit the new time slots provided for it to broadcast. The station also redesigned its appearance while renovating its studios.

Since these changes, the evening schedule now begins at 18:00 with a compact, six-minute edition of buten un binnen. This is followed by buten un binnen Sportblitz and buten un binnen Wetter for the day's sports news and weather forecast. Between 18:15 and 19:30 programming switches to shows from NDR Fernsehen, and this is followed by a regional magazine version of buten un binnen. Another new addition is the extension of live broadcasts to Sundays, which means that the station can now provide up-to-date coverage of any weekend sports events, instead of offering a pre-recorded news package. The pre-recorded news package could only cover things that happen a day before the actual broadcast.

Radio Bremen TV's broadcast lines now terminate at 20:00 each day, with transmission switching over in time for the start of Das Erste's Tagesschau. Besides the regional channels, whose window of operation has been cut down to between 18:00 and 18:15 and then followed by a second slot from 19:30 to 20:00, the station broadcasts joint programming which has been produced in collaboration with their affiliate and neighbouring regional broadcaster, NDR Fernsehen. Radio Bremen's content, which is transmitted at the same time as this jointly produced programming, has been given the name Radio Bremen Fernsehen.

== Logos ==

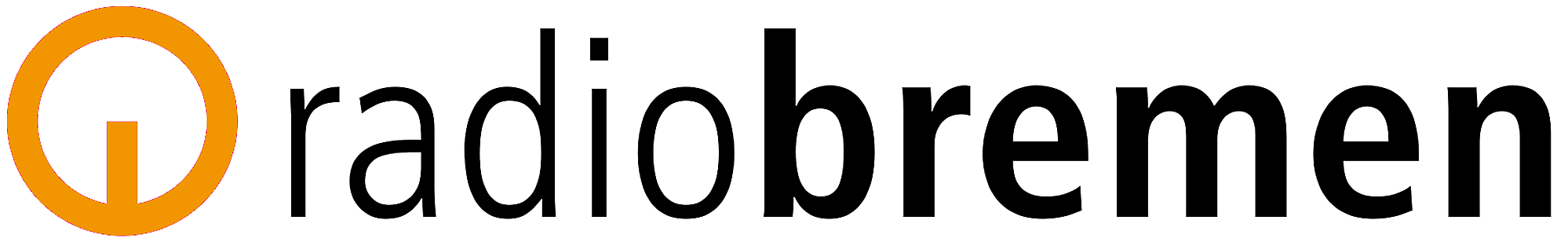
2015–present

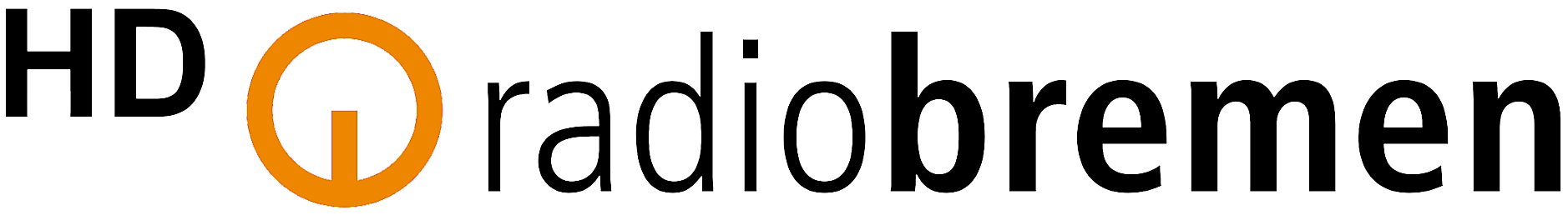
29 March 2017 – present
