= Schmausenbuck =

Mountain in Germany

Coordinates: 49°27′N 11°09′E

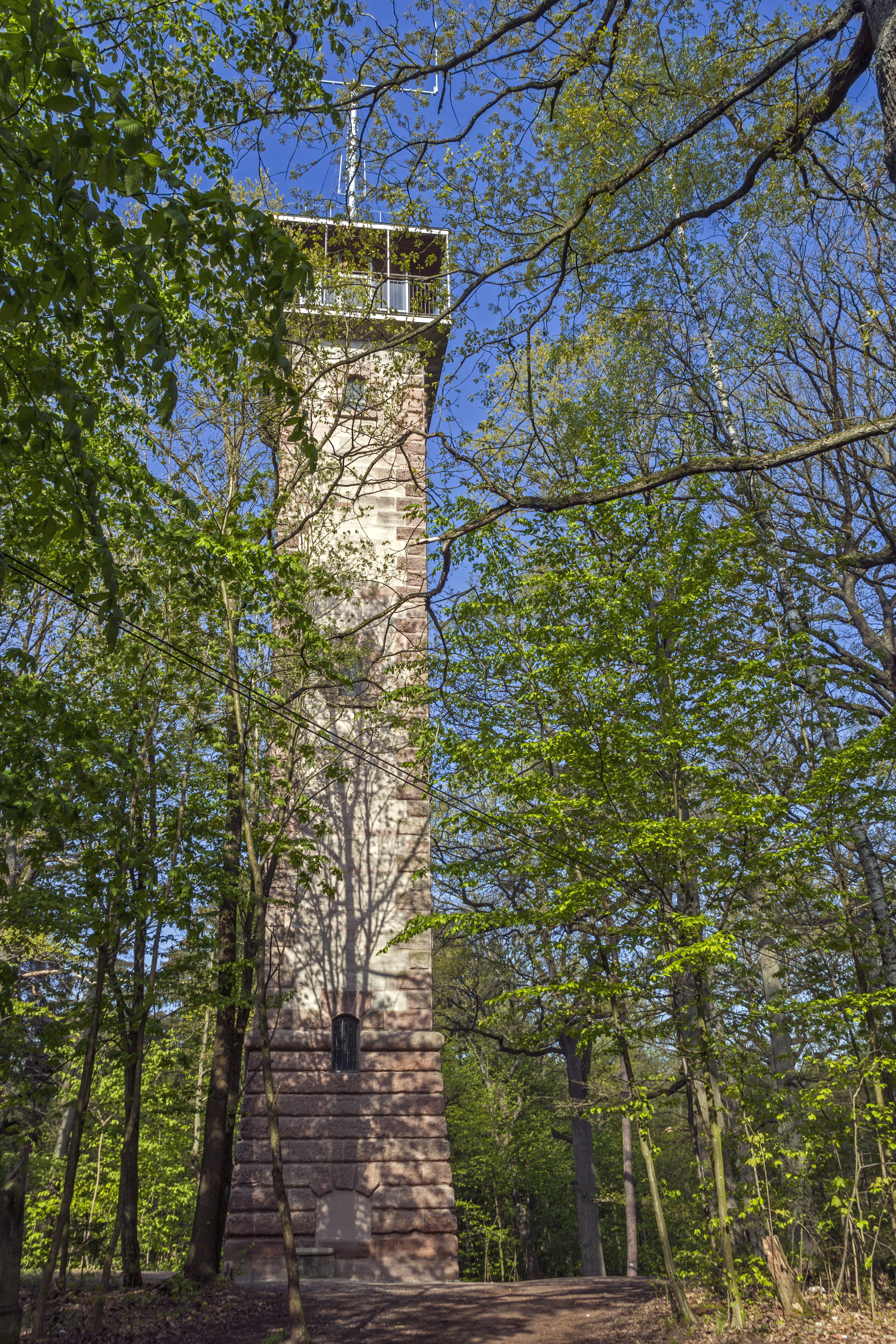

Highest point
- Elevation: 390 m (1,280 ft)
- Isolation: 5.58 km (3.47 mi) to Brunner Berg

Geography
- Location: Bavaria, Germany

Schmausenbuck is a mountain of Bavaria, Germany.
