= Big 106.2 =

- Auckland, New Zealand; New Zealand
- Frequency: 106.2 MHz

Programming
- Language: English
- Format: Adult contemporary

Ownership
- Owner: Big Radio Limited

History
- First air date: 1 November 2008 – June 2010

Technical information
- Transmitter coordinates: 36.8484°S 174.7621°E

Links
- Website: Official website (link dead)

Big 106.2 or Big FM was a radio station in Auckland, New Zealand, that was launched on 1 November 2008 at 9AM, broadcasting on 106.2FM. The original station was started by radio veterans Larry Summerville and Bernie Brown and was owned and operated by Big Radio Limited. The original station played Adult Contemporary music. In April 2010 there were reports that Big FM had been sold to Thane and Richard Kirby for an undisclosed sum. Thane Kirby is the founder of Auckland radio stations, George FM, UpFM, and Base FM and the now defunct TV station ALT TV. On 1 May 2010 the current format was supposedly dropped and a spoiler format known as Big Time FM was launched. Most of the announcers disappeared from the station around this time as well. The station was planning to launch its new format in June 2010.

Big FM was one of the few stations in New Zealand not owned or operated by New Zealand's two largest radio companies RadioWorks or The Radio Network, thanks to the limited commercial licence Big FM broadcast on neither company could purchase the station when it came up for sale.

On 23 June 2010 the station unexpectedly went off the air. No press release was issued as to why the station went off the air and the main indicator that Big FM was no longer operating from a comment left from a Big FM staff member on their Facebook page saying "arghh ** Gurgle gurlge .....gasp - - - splutter..... sssssssss". The Big FM website was up for a time after it went off-air with no news as to what had been happening, and clicking on the web stream on the page brought up an error.

There were several complaints on Big FM's Facebook page from listeners unhappy at the changes made. The Facebook page was removed in mid-September 2010, while the Big FM website was taken down in early November 2010.

5Tunz Communications Ltd later bought 106.2 FM and in March 2011 the frequency began transmissions by Hindi radio station Humm FM. Humm FM in turn was later purchased by Mediaworks, and was moved to 104.2FM in late 2021. As a result, 106.2 became the new frequency for The Rock, which had moved from 90.2FM to make way for their new talkback station Today FM, which launched in March 2022. Today FM was shut down in March 2023 leading The Rock to move back to 90.2 FM, and Channel X took over the 106.2FM frequency in May 2023.

== Announcers ==
Big FM's original lineup was as follows.

- Breakfast 5.30am - 10am: Brent Harbour (who went on to work in radio in Dubai before returning to Mediaworks) & Lance Dunne (who went on to be breakfast host on Rodney's More FM - formerly Times FM)
- Daytime 10am - 2pm: Suzy Cato
- Drive 2pm - 7pm: Tony Ujdur
- Nights 7pm - 12am: Nick Robinson

During the period between 1 May and 23 June 2010 when the station went off the airwaves there were no announcers on the air.
