= Bremen Next =

German radio station of Radio Bremen

- Bremen; Germany
- Frequencies: FM: 96.7 MHz (Bremen), 92.1 MHz (Bremerhaven); DAB+: 6D

Programming
- Language: German
- Format: Rhythmic CHR

Ownership
- Operator: Radio Bremen (RB)
- Sister stations: Bremen Eins, Bremen Zwei, Bremen Vier

History
- First air date: 17 August 2016; 9 years ago
- Former frequencies: 95.6 MHz

Links
- Webcast: Listen Live
- Website: bremennext.de

Bremen Next is a German, public, youth-oriented radio station owned and operated by Radio Bremen (RB). Aimed at an audience aged 15 to 25, it broadcasts a rhythmic CHR format with mostly hip hop and electronic music and makes heavy use of social media.

As of 2023, Bremen Next has nearly 150,000 daily listeners.

== Reception ==
The station can be heard via FM broadcasting in Bremen on 96.7 MHz at 100 kW; in Bremerhaven on 92.1 MHz at 25 kW, and in both cities via DAB+ (6D). A live stream is available on Bremennext.de. Bremen Next switched its first FM frequency (95.6 MHz) with COSMO on 3 February 2017.
