= Osradio 104.8 =

Radio station in Germany

osradio 104.8 is a "non-commercial" public radio station in Osnabrück, Germany which has been on air since 1 April 2002. It is the successor to the “Offenen Kanal Osnabrück” (Osnabrück Open Channel) which commenced operations on 18 October 1996 as one of 13 public radio projects. The broadcast licence, initially scheduled to last seven years, was extended through to 31 March 2014 in 2009; in spring 2013 it was further extended to 31 March 2021.

In accordance with state media law in Lower Saxony, the station has three key purposes: up-to-date reporting of local news, remaining easily accessible to all people and conveying media literacy through seminars and training.

== Reception ==
The station's broadcasting area covers the city of Osnabrück as well as the surrounding Landkreis (county), home to roughly 350,000 residents overall. The station can be received on the frequency of 104.8 MHz via antenna (97.65 MHz via cable); in addition a live stream and podcasts can be accessed online.

== Programme ==
The station's programme includes local news, reports, commentaries, interviews, tips and various other services, with topic areas such as politics, business, sport, culture, and university and school life. Particular focus is given to the station's three “magazines”: “Startklar” (6-10 a.m.), “Regional” (10 a.m. – 4 p.m.) and “Impuls” (4-6 p.m.). On the weekends, programmes such as “Sport total” (2-6 p.m. on Saturdays) are broadcast.

Broadcast spaces are also given to the public by the editorial team as part of the station's programme. Recurring topics and groups have become established parts of the programme within the framework of about 60 free broadcast spaces.

=== Youth radio ===
As part of the station's commitment to media education, there is an independent editorial team named “Mikrowellen” aimed at pupils up to 15 years of age, which broadcasts its programme once a fortnight. Also appearing on air on a fortnightly basis is the group “Teen Spirit”, which allows aspiring broadcasters of 16 years and above to acquire experience in the field.

=== Student radio ===
There has been a close partnership between osradio and Unifunk Osnabrück (UFO) since 1996. The Unifunk (uni radio) is a student-run initiative and also a registered association, receiving financial support from the student parliament of the University of Osnabrück. Since 1998 the UFO has had its own studio in the Mensa (canteen) at the Osnabrück Students’ Union on the castle gardens; however it also uses technical support provided by osradio. Since 2007, the Unifunk has broadcast four one-hour programmes per week, making it osradio's most active group of users and also the most active campus radio organisation in Lower Saxony. In November 2009, students at the University of Osnabrück started broadcasting the programme “Radio Out-Sight” once a week. This took place in the context of the “Soziale Arbeit” (Social Work) course and lasted for one year, addressing the issue of assistance to the homeless in Osnabrück.

=== “Radio der aktiven Generation” (Radio for the Active Generation) ===
The over-50s’ editorial team styles itself “Zeitlos” (Timeless) with the support and assistance of employees at the station, the members of this team broadcast their programme once a week, which is tailored to the preferences of their generation.

== Project work ==
=== Funkflöhe (“Radio Fleas”) ===
The “Funkflöhe” project started in February 2009 as an environmental media service for primary school children. The goal of this temporary project (with a two-year timeframe) was to use an alternative method of teaching to equip the children with an appropriate understanding of the environment and environmental issues. The medium of radio was selected as the most appropriate modern medium of communication. The project, which received support and cooperation from numerous institutions, saw 13 primary schools participate. In December 2009 it was given formal recognition by UNESCO as one of the official projects of its World Decade of Education for Sustainable Development. The “Fünkflöhe” project ended at the beginningof 2011.

=== RAUM OS – Environmental Media Project ===
““RAUM OS” Radio-Umweltreporter Osnabrück” (RAUM OS: Environmental Radio Reporters of Osnabrück) was a pilot project of osradio 104,8. Its aim was to find new methods of environmental education and also to anchor learning about sustainable development in the secondary school educational system. Secondary school pupils conducted research on topics such as energy, transportation and waste disposal and prepared it for radio broadcast by means of forming “RAUM OS plc” groups. This two-year project (lasting from February 2011 to January 2013) was given financial support by the Deutsche Bundesstiftung Umwelt (German Federal Environmental Endowment) and the Niedersächsiche Bingo-Umweltstiftung (Lower Saxony Bingo Environmental Endowment).

== Links ==
- osradio website
- “Funkflöhe” project website
- RAUM OS project website
- “osradio 104,8” article on the Niedersächsischen Landesmedienanstalt (Lower Saxony State Media Office) website

== Former employees ==
- Oliver Rickwärtz
- Marc Engelhard
- Dennis Rohling
