= Fronalpstock =

Fronalpstock may refer to two mountains in Switzerland with the same name:

- Fronalpstock (Glarus), in the Glarus Alps and the canton of Glarus
- Fronalpstock (Schwyz), in the Schwyzer Alps and the canton of Schwyz
