= Dobl Transmitter =

Coordinates: 46°57′00″N 15°22′48″E

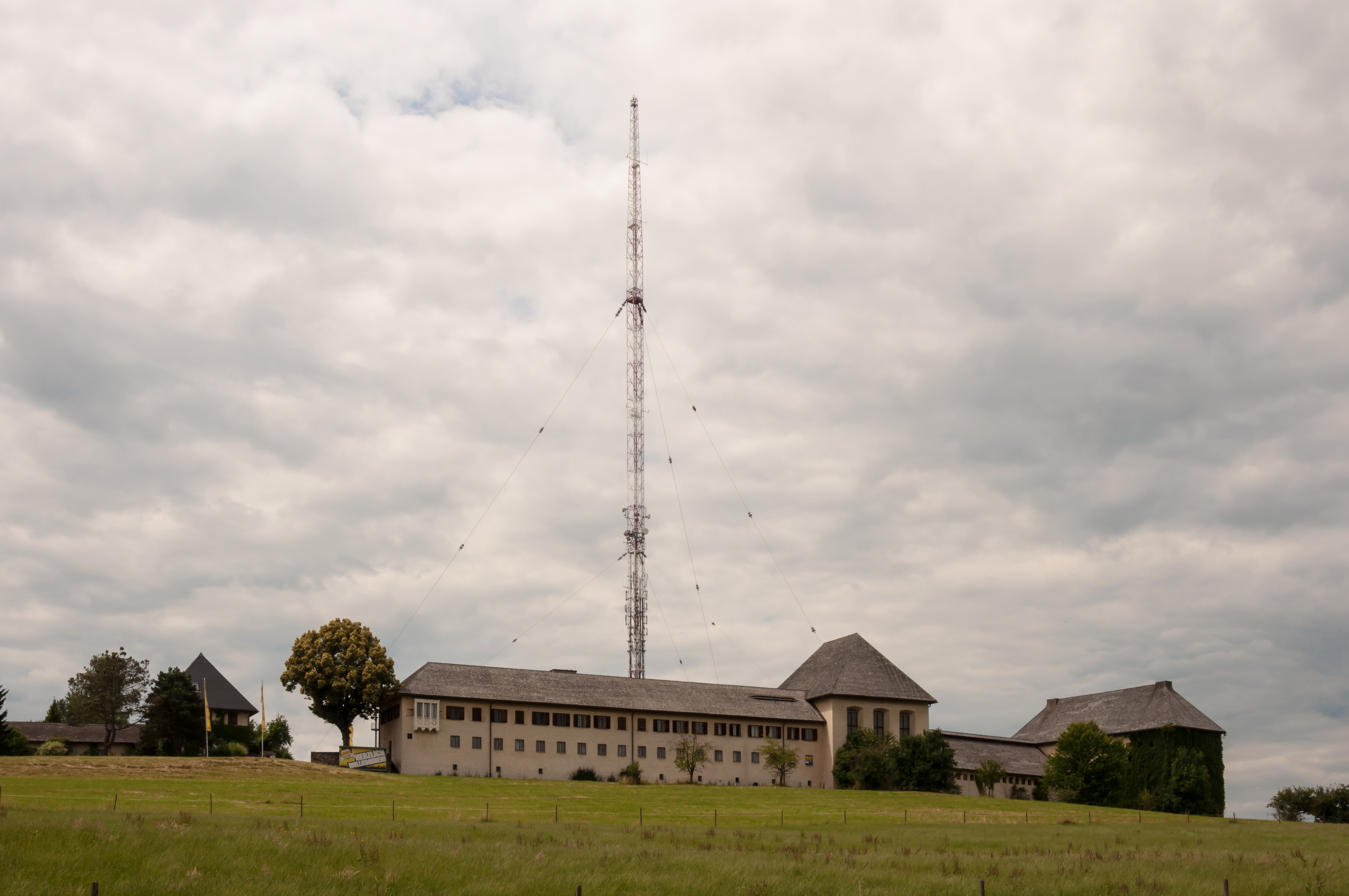
Dobl Sender komplett

Dobl Transmitter was a facility for medium wave broadcasting at Dobl, Styria, Austria, built in 1939–1941. It was used as an antenna a 156-metre (511 ft) high guyed lattice steel mast, which was guyed in two levels at 113 and 73 metres (371 and 240 ft). Dobl Transmitter was shut down in 1984 and is now a technical museum.
