= Fernmeldeturm Münster =

Coordinates: 51°57′00″N 7°39′59″E

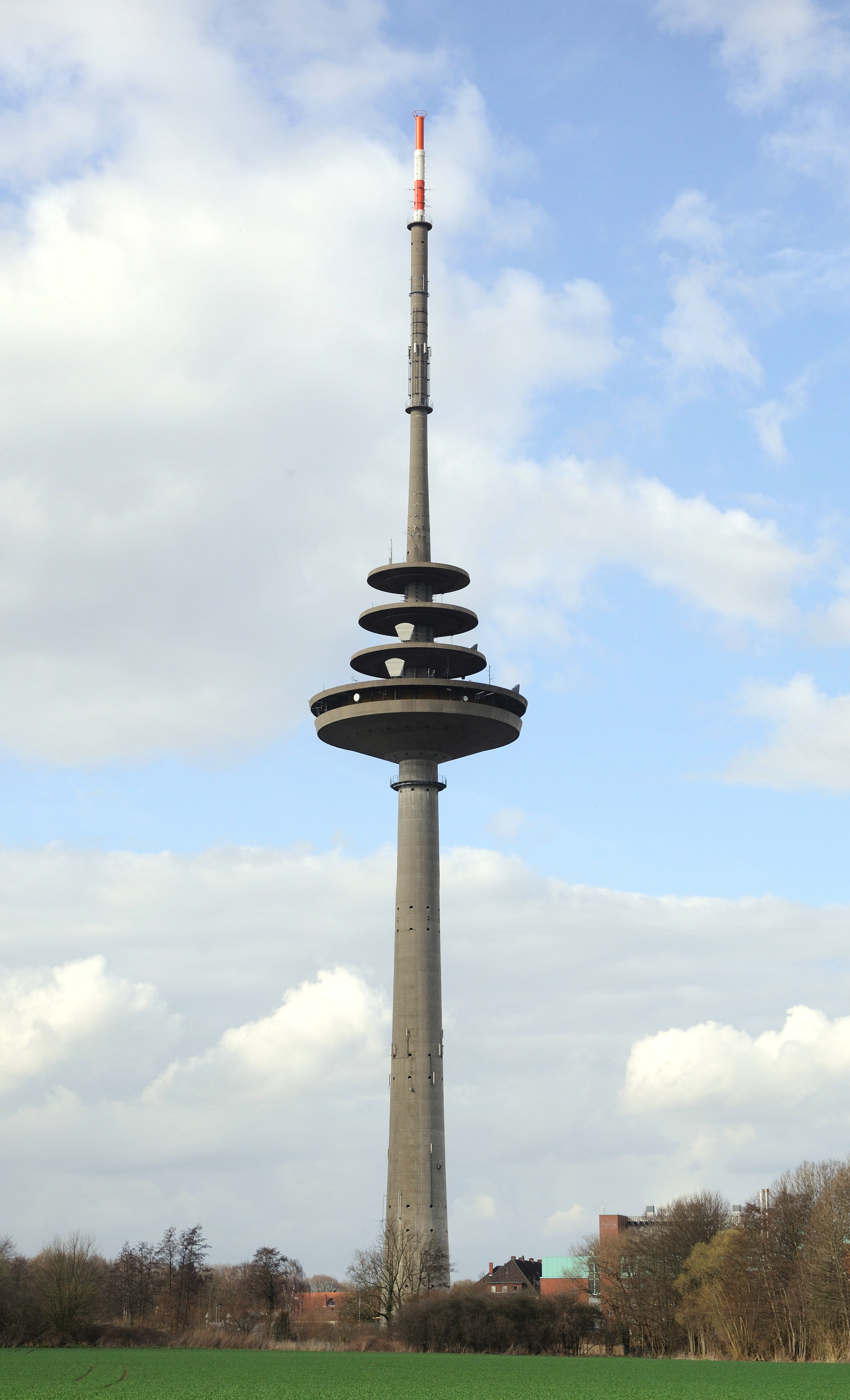
Telecommunication Tower Münster

The Fernmeldeturm Münster (Telecommunication Tower Münster), colloquially known as "Fernsehturm" (TV-Tower) is the modern landmark of Münster completed in 1985/86. The 229.5-metre-high (753 ft) tower, which is used for directional services and TV-, VHF- and UHF-transmission, is inaccessible to the public. The basket of this tower, which also carries the name "Münster 42" has a diameter of 40 metres and is situated at a height of 108 metres.

Fernmeldeturm Münster, which has a weight of 14,000 tons, is the property of Deutsche Telekom.

== See also ==
- List of amateur radio repeater sites in Germany
- List of Towers
