= Geissleite =

Mountain in Germany

Coordinates: 49°40′45″N 12°14′06″E

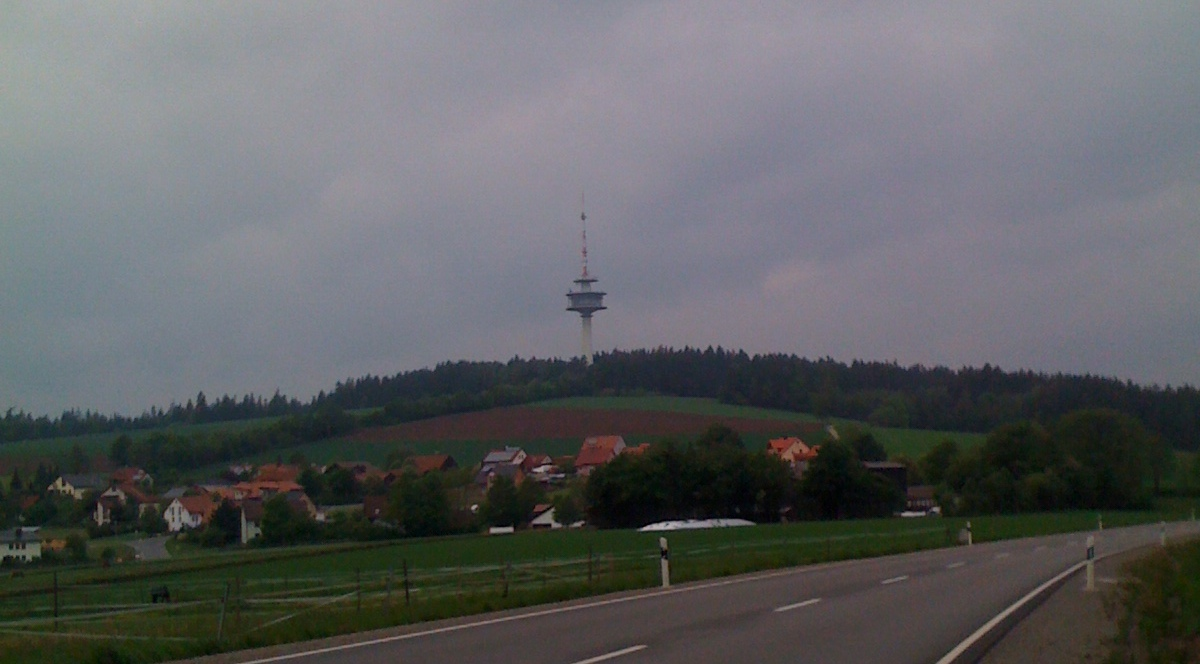
- Geissleite with telecommunications tower

Highest point
- Elevation: 636 m (2,087 ft)

Geography
- Location: Bavaria, Germany

Geissleite is a hill within Bavaria, Germany, located in the Upper Palatinate Forest. It is home to a telecommunications tower that stands at 118 m (387 ft 2 in) and the hill stands at 636 m (2,086 ft 7 in) tall.
