= Dasding =

German youth radio station

DASDING
- Live. Laut. Lässig. (Live. Loud. Casual.)
- Germany
- Broadcast area: Baden-Württemberg and Rhineland-Palatinate (Germany)
- Frequencies: DAB+: 11A (Rhineland-Palatinate), 8D/9D (Baden-Württemberg); 23 FM frequencies; (see below)
- RDS: DASDING_

Programming
- Language: German
- Format: Contemporary hit radio

Ownership
- Owner: Südwestrundfunk (SWR)

History
- First air date: 17 May 1997

Links
- Website: dasding.de

Dasding (lit. 'The Thing', pronounced [dasˈdɪŋ]) is a German youth radio station operated by Südwestrundfunk (SWR). It is hosted mostly by young people and is commercial-free. While playing a typical narrow rotation in the main hours, it also broadcasts alternative music genres in special shows in the evening hours.

It was originally intended as an additional radio station available only on DAB digital radio. After the failure of DAB in Germany, it was additionally broadcast on a few FM frequencies which previously only broadcast a foreign language program in the evening hours. Even though additional FM frequencies have been enabled, they are weak and so the reception area is generally limited to the big cities.

== Distribution ==
DASDING is available statewide on DAB+ digital radio: 11A (Rhineland-Palatinate), 8D/9D (Baden-Württemberg).

FM frequencies are as follows:

- Albstadt: 87.8 FM
- Bad Kreuznach: 90.9 FM
- Bad Marienberg: 91.3 FM
- Bad Mergentheim: 100.5 FM
- Baden-Baden: 91.7 FM
- Bendorf: 95.7 FM
- Buchen: 100.6 FM
- Freiburg: 91.1 FM
- Heilbronn: 93.1 FM
- Kaiserslautern: 92.5 FM
- Koblenz: 99.4 FM
- Mainz: 105.2 FM
- Mannheim: 91.5 FM
- Mötzingen: 90.5 FM
- Neustadt an der Weinstraße: 102.2 FM
- Nierstein: 98.4 FM
- Pforzheim: 97.4 FM
- Ravensburg: 107.2 FM
- Reutlingen: 97.7 FM
- Stuttgart: 90.8 FM
- Trier: 91.7 FM
- Tübingen: 97.3 FM
- Ulm: 98.9 FM
