= Bremen Vier =

- Bremen; Germany
- Frequencies: FM: 101.2 MHz (Bremen), 100.8 MHz (Bremerhaven); DAB+: 6D

Programming
- Language: German
- Format: Hot adult contemporary

Ownership
- Owner: Radio Bremen
- Sister stations: Bremen Eins , Bremen Zwei , Bremen Next

History
- First air date: 1 December 1986

Links
- Webcast: Listen Live
- Website: bremenvier.de

Bremen Vier (English: Bremen Four) is a radio station from Radio Bremen for the city of Bremen and Bremerhaven in the Free Hanseatic City of Bremen. It broadcasts a hot adult contemporary format dominated by pop music and has been operating since 1 December 1986. It is targeted at an audience aged 14 to 49.

As of 2023, Bremen Vier has more than 200,000 daily listeners.

== History ==
Historic logo until 2001

The first broadcast by Bremen Vier was on 1 December 1986 at 9:05 AM. The first song was "Pop Muzik" by M, and the first host was Jürgen Büsselberg.

In December 2007 the company moved to a new radio station. The last track played was again "Pop Muzik", and the last host was Axel P. Sommerfeld.

Hansawelle programming was broadcast in the mornings before 9 AM until April 1989, when the station's first morning show, Slip, began. From 1999 until 2008 the morning show was Der Dicke und der Dünne (The Fat and the Lean), hosted alternately by Krause and Marcus Rudolph. A new morning show began in January 2009, with Roland Kanwicher and Olaf Rathje, alternating with Jens-Uwe Krause and Tina Padberg.

== Programming ==
Bremen Vier broadcasts from 5 AM to 1 AM. Overnight, the station airs ARD's Popnacht (Pop Night), which is produced by SWR3.

== Hosts ==
- Ansgar Guse
- Arnd Zeigler
- Axel P(atrick) Sommerfeld
- Christina Loock
- Christine Heuck
- Hendrik Plass
- Ike Pauli
- Jan Böhmermann
- Jens-Uwe Krause
- Julia Bamberg
- Keno Bergholz
- Malin Kompa
- Malte Döbert
- Malte Janssen
- Malte Völz
- Olaf Rathje
- Olli Schulz
- Peter Spalek
- Roland Kanwicher
- Teja Adams
- Tina Padberg

== Reception ==
The station can be heard via FM broadcasting in Bremen on 101.2 MHz at 100 kW; in Bremerhaven on 100.8 MHz at 25 kW, and in both cities via DAB+ (6D). A live stream is available on Bremenvier.de.
