= Bremen Eins =

- Bremen; Germany
- Frequencies: FM: 93.8 MHz (Bremen), 89.3 MHz (Bremerhaven); DAB+: 6D

Programming
- Language: German
- Format: Oldie-based adult contemporary

Ownership
- Owner: Radio Bremen
- Sister stations: Bremen Zwei, Bremen Vier, Bremen Next

History
- First air date: 23 April 2001

Links
- Webcast: Listen Live
- Website: bremeneins.de

Bremen Eins is a German, public radio station owned and operated by the Radio Bremen (RB). It launched on 23 April 2001, succeeding Hansawelle and Radio Bremen Melodie.

The station is aimed at an audience aged 45 and above. It broadcasts an adult contemporary format, focusing on music from the 1970s to 1990s. Programming is produced between 5:00 AM (6:00 AM on Sundays) and midnight. Outside of these times, SWR1's night programme is broadcast. As of 2023, Bremen Eins has more than 350,000 daily listeners.

== Reception ==
The station can be heard via FM broadcasting in Bremen on 93.8 MHz at 100 kW; in Bremerhaven on 89.3 MHz at 25 kW, and in both cities via DAB+ (6D). A live stream is available on Bremeneins.de.
