= Radio Horeb =

- Balderschwang; Germany
- Broadcast area: Oberallgäu

Programming
- Language: German
- Format: Catholic
- Affiliations: The World Family of Radio Maria

Ownership
- Owner: Internationale Christliche Rundfunkgemeinschaft e. V.

History
- Founded: 1996

Links
- Webcast: https://rs16.stream24.net/horeb.mp3
- Website: http://www.horeb.org/

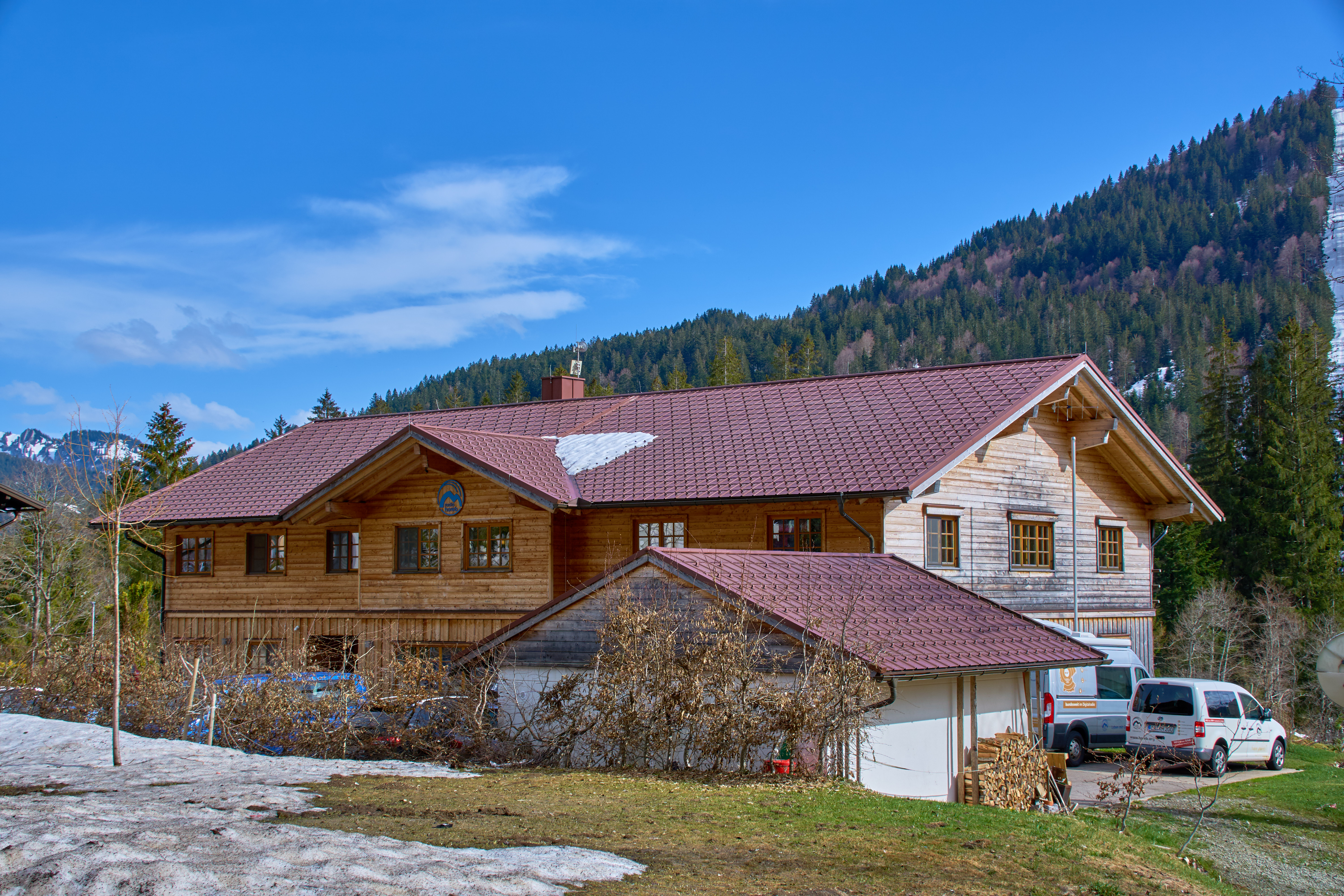
View to Radio Horeb's studio in Balderschwang, Bavaria

Radio Horeb is a radio station in the German federal state of Bavaria. The studios are located in Balderschwang and Munich. The guideline for content is the teaching of the Roman Catholic Church. Radio Horeb belongs to The World Family of Radio Maria and finances its content exclusively from donations from its listeners.

== Programming ==
The ad-free program consists of five pillars: Liturgy, Christian spirituality, self-help, Christian music and news.

Daily a Holy Mass is broadcast live from various Catholic churches in Germany. The Liturgy of the Hours (Lauds, Vespers, Compline), Eucharistic adoration, and prayers of the Angelus, Rosary and the Stations of the Cross give the program a basic pious framework.

The station takes over the news from Vatican Radio every day at 4 pm, which is repeated at 2 am. In addition, the radio academy produced by Vatican Radio is taken over every day at 6 pm.

== History ==
Radio Horeb is named after the biblical Mount Horeb on the Sinai Peninsula. The two mountains in the lower part of Radio Horeb's blue logo symbolize Mount Horeb and at the same time the viewer could recognize an "M" which stands for the Virgin Mary.

The "International Christian Broadcasting Association" (ICR eV), based at that time in Ingolstadt, received local broadcasting times as "Radio Neues Europa" in the mid-1980s FM frequencies in southern Germany. In Munich, the program from Radio Neues Europa was initially always available on Sundays. In 1995 the German priest Richard Kocher was elected chairman of the ICR e.V. Due to his work as the parish administrator of St. Anton in Balderschwang, the radio activities increasingly shifted to Oberallgäu. Radio Horeb's administrative center was later set up in Immenstadt im Allgäu.

On the feast of the Immaculate Conception (8 December) in 1996, a Catholic 24-hour radio programme called Radio Horeb went on air for the first time via the Astra satellite. The radio station was modeled on Radio Maria Italy, which had quickly risen to become one of the most popular radio stations in Italy. In Munich, broadcasting continued over FM under the name "Radio Neues Europa". In 2000 the name was changed to Radio Horeb Munich.

The program has also been broadcast in Leipzig via DVB-T since November 2007 (in regular operation since May 2010). Further locations were planned in Dresden, Chemnitz and Zwickau. The broadcasting operations in Berlin that started in September 2005 were shut down in January 2014. As part of the changeover to DVB-T2 at the end of March 2017, the broadcaster abandoned this transmission path and abandoned the remaining DVB-T locations.

On 18 August 2008 the groundbreaking was in Balderschwang for a new studio, as a replacement for the previous studio in Almhof Lässer. A sixty square meter chapel is integrated into the studio.

== See also ==
- Radio Maria
