= BigFM =

- Germany
- Broadcast area: Baden-Württemberg, Rhineland-Palatinate, Saarland (FM & DAB+), Berlin, Bremen, Hamburg, Hesse, Lower Saxony, North Rhine-Westphalia (DAB+)
- Frequency: various (see below)

Programming
- Format: Contemporary hit radio

Ownership
- Owner: Rheinland-Pfälzische Rundfunk GmbH & Co. KG; bigFM in Baden-Württemberg GmbH & Co. KG; Skyline Medien Saarland GmbH

History
- First air date: 1 April 2000

Links
- Webcast: Listen Live
- Website: Big FM

BigFM is a German radio network that consists of three regional radio stations: bigFM Der Neue Beat in Baden-Württemberg, bigFM Hot Music Radio in Rhineland-Palatinate and bigFM Saarland in Saarland. The format is Rhythmic CHR, and the network specialises in pop, rock, dance, hip-hop and rap. Talk shows are also featured late at night that mainly focuses on young people's issues and stories, and broadcast weeknights from midnight – 2 am (Nightlounge) and Sunday from 10:45 pm - midnight (Night Talk).

== History ==
On 20 July 2023 Rob Green began hosting the digital station BigFM Dance Radio."

On 8 August 2023 bigFM launched the innovative AI-produced webstream. This pioneering project marks a significant milestone in the broadcasting industry. bigGPT is an AI-generated audio experience for Germany, featuring only synthetic voices, AI-generated content, and the bigGPT Top 40 of the most-streamed songs on the web."

== FM Frequencies ==
Today bigFM is the biggest private radio station for young people in Germany with 2.5 million weekly listeners. In addition, 11 million people are aware of the station's existence.

- FM Stuttgart: 89.5
- FM Rottweil: 99.0
- FM Villingen-Schwenningen: 99.5
- FM Cologne: 104.9
- FM Mainz / Frankfurt: 104.5
- FM Koblenz: 104.0
- FM Trier: 106.4
- FM Eifel: 106.6
- FM Karlsruhe: 105.2
- FM Kaiserslautern: 107.6
- FM Saarburg: 96.5
- FM Pirmasens: 96.7
- FM Baden-Baden: 103.8
- FM Mannheim: 87.8
- FM Heidelberg: 90.9
- FM Sinsheim: 97.2
- FM Ulm: 99.7
- FM Freiburg: 102.8
- FM Tübingen: 89.7
- FM Heilbronn: 104.7
- FM Aalen: 105.1
- FM Göppingen: 100.3
- FM Ludwigshafen: 106.7
- FM Saarbrücken: 94.2
- FM Merzig: 92.6
- FM St. Ingbert: 96.8

== Controversies ==
The creators of bigFM had always been using practices that were rated by observers as nonsense or meaningless. In one case in 2016 this also led to a criticism of the national institute for communication Baden-Wuerttemberg at the marketing practice of the transmitter.

One of the station's most controversial actions took place in summer 2017. Rob Green attempted to send a WhatsApp message to Marlen Gröger, who he claimed was a newsreader for DASDING. Its content stated that if she could leave the studio immediately even when she was reading out the news on that station, she would get a job on "Germany's biggest morning show". That message was finally sent at 7:31am that day.

The message was as follows (originally in German):

Hey Marlen, wenn du jetzt LIVE während deiner Nachrichten hinschmeißt, hab ich nen Job für dich in Deutschlands biggster Morningshow auf BigFM! Wir hören dich gerade!

It turned out that the person who read the newscast at the time on DASDING was Athene Pi Permantier, not Gröger. In addition, Gröger had already finished her contract with DASDING for quite some time and was now working at BigFM.

The radio station's production team posted an image of the act as its proof, however it caused some major backlash, with Facebook users calling the act "fake news", "scam" and questioning the station's journalistic ethic. Moreover, Baden-Württemberg Foundation decided to cancel the media partnership with BigFM for an event against fake news, false reports and fake information. The radio station later issued an apology saying they were sorry for this cancellation, but assured it was completely about "introducing a new good journalist" alone, and argued that the term of "fake news" was highly questionable, since Rob Green's show was entertainment-oriented, not hard news-oriented. In the comment section under some of the event's reports, some users said the action was not good, but described the excitement as "exaggerated." It was also noted that Marlen Gröger could not read Rob's message whatsoever during the live newscast. After investigating this view was confirmed by the Landesanstalt für Kommunikation Baden-Württemberg (LFK). There is also no violation of the state media law. The LFK accused the media criticism website Übermedien.de for "mistakenly" reporting about the bigFM action.

== Webradios ==
In addition to the four main BigFM streams.

- BigFM Charts
- BigFM Hip-Hop
- BigFM Dance
- BigFM Mashup
- BigFM Rock am Ring
- BigFM Sunset Lounge
- BigFM US Rap & Hip-Hop
- BigFM Oldschool Rap & Hip-Hop
- BigFM Deutschrap
- BigFM Deutscher Hip-Hop Charts
- BigFM Oldschool Deutschrap
- BigFM Groovenight
- BigFM World Beats
- BigFM NitroX EDM & Progressive
- BigFM NitroX Deep & Tech House
- BigFM Latin Beats
- BigBALKAN
- BigFM Dance
- bigGPT
