= Deutschlandradio =

German national public radio broadcaster

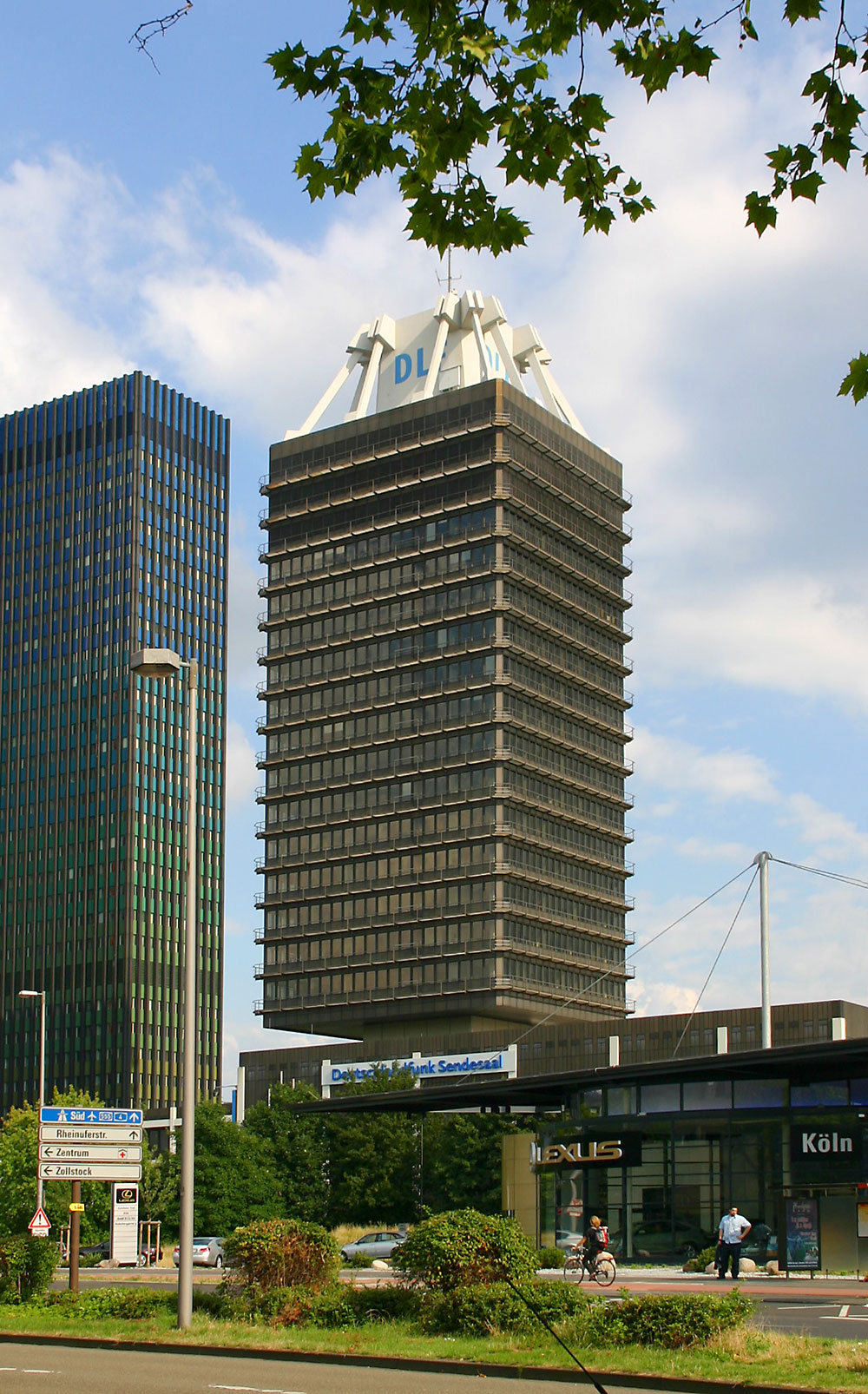
- Headquarters in Cologne
- Type: Public-service sound broadcasting
- Country: Germany
- Broadcast area: National
- Headquarters: Cologne

Programming
- Language(s): German

Ownership
- Key people: Stefan Raue, Chairman

History
- Launch date: 1994; 32 years ago

Coverage
- Stations: Deutschlandfunk; Deutschlandfunk Kultur; Deutschlandfunk Nova; Dokumente und Debatten

Links
- Webcast: List of streams
- Website: www.deutschlandradio.de

Deutschlandradio (DLR; lit. 'Radio Germany') is a national German public radio broadcaster.

== History ==
Deutschlandfunk was originally a West German news radio targeting listeners within West Germany as well as in neighbouring countries, Deutschlandfunk Kultur is the result of a merger of West Berlin's RIAS station and East Berlin's DS Kultur after German reunification. Both networks that used to broadcast mainly on the AM bands have since spread throughout Germany, having been allocated many additional FM transmitters. However, because of lack of analogue frequencies, during 2003 Deutschlandradio changed its distribution strategy to digital terrestrial transmission.

== Stations ==
It operates four national networks:

- Deutschlandfunk: mainly news and information
- Deutschlandfunk Kultur: culture in a broader sense
- Deutschlandfunk Nova: aimed at young adults, mainly spoken-word
- Dokumente und Debatten: opt-out channel, often for special events

Dokumente und Debatten is a digital-only special-event channel. It broadcasts coverage of the federal parliament, sports events, talk shows and shipping forecasts. Many of the talk shows are rebroadcasts of the audio portions of TV shows made by ARD, ZDF or Phoenix. It uses digital frequencies of both Deutschlandfunk and Deutschlandfunk Kultur.

Deutschlandfunk Nova is knowledge orientated station, started in 2010 as DRadio Wissen, targeting a younger audience, and broadcast only digitally – via satellite, cable, DAB, and online.

Deutschlandradio is based in Cologne, with some departments—including Deutschlandfunk Kultur—based in Berlin.

== Branding ==
On 1 May 2017, DRadio Wissen was renamed Deutschlandfunk Nova, Deutschlandradio Kultur was renamed Deutschlandfunk Kultur.

== Distribution and transmitters ==
The three programs and the additional special event channel are all distributed terrestrially via Digital Audio Broadcasting (DAB+) on a nation-wide single frequency network (SFN) in VHF channel 5C. The coverage at the end of 2019 is for portable indoor reception 85% of the population and for mobile reception 96% of the area of Germany or 99% of the highways respectively.

For an intermediate time the two programs Deutschlandfunk and Deutschlandfunk Kultur are still transmitted in analog way via FM with an average coverage of 64% of the area. The switch over from analogue to digital started in 2015 with the switch-off of medium wave and long wave. In 2018/2019 first small-power FM transmitters were switched-off two. The aim is to further improve the digital terrestrial coverage of DAB+ and to reduce the analogue transmission step by step. For stationary reception the programs are also distributed via satellite on the transponder of ZDF.

Of course the programs are streamed via the internet and available on relevant platforms. Beside the linear programs extensive non-linear content is available via audio-on-demand (podcast, mediathek and various platforms). Deutschlandradio is also very active in social media networks in order to make the content available to all public.

== Chairmen ==
- 1994: Dieter Stolte
- 1994–2009: Ernst Elitz
- 2009–2017: Willi Steul
- since 2017: Stefan Raue

== Orchestras and choirs ==
Deutschlandradio has a 40% share in Rundfunk Orchester und Chöre GmbH, a non-profit organisation which operates:

- Berlin Radio Symphony Orchestra (East Berlin)
- Deutsches Symphonie-Orchester Berlin
- Berlin Radio Choir
- RIAS Kammerchor

The other shareholders are the Federal Republic of Germany (35%), the State of Berlin (20%) and RBB (5%).

== Logo history ==
Development of the Deutschlandradio logo

Logo until March 2005

Logo until May 2010

Logo from June 2010 (from 2012: alternative Logo)

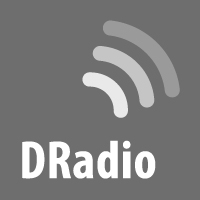
Former icon (2012–2017)

Logo until 30 April 2017

Logo since 1 May 2017
