= Deutschlandfunk Nova =

German radio station

Coordinates: 50°54′10″N 6°57′34″E

- Cologne; Germany
- Broadcast area: Germany
- Frequencies: DAB+, DVB-S, DVB-C, Internet

Programming
- Language: German
- Format: Speech

Ownership
- Owner: Deutschlandradio
- Sister stations: Deutschlandfunk, Deutschlandfunk Kultur, Dokumente und Debatten

History
- First air date: 18 January 2010; 16 years ago
- Former names: DRadio Wissen (2010–17)

Links
- Website: deutschlandfunknova.de

Deutschlandfunk Nova (German: [ˈdɔʏtʃlantˌfʊŋk ˈnoːva]; abbreviated DLF Nova), formerly known as DRadio Wissen, is a public broadcasting radio station and part of Deutschlandradio. The program is aimed at students and young adults. Their broadcasting studios are situated in Cologne, as are most of the other Deutschlandradio formats. However, in contrast to Deutschlandfunk and Deutschlandfunk Kultur, Deutschlandfunk Nova broadcasts primarily over digital radio and online.

Their slogan 'Es ist kompliziert. Dazu guter Pop' (It's complicated. With a side of good pop) is meant to describe the range of music played and the topics covered.

== History ==
DRadio Wissen (2010–2017)

Deutschlandfunk Nova is a spoken word station, started in 2010, targeting young adults, and broadcast only digitally - via satellite, cable, DAB, and online.

On 1 May 2017, DRadio Wissen was renamed Deutschlandfunk Nova.

== Formats ==
=== Hielscher oder Haase ===
A morning show, aired from 6:30 to 10 a.m., the show covers the internet, politics, pop culture and science

=== Grünstreifen ===
Broadcasting from 10 a.m. to 6 p.m. during the week, 2 to 6 p.m. on Saturdays and 12 to 4 p.m. on Sundays. News and music.

=== Update ===
Broadcasting Monday til Friday between 6 and 8 p.m., topics: 'Was war los heute? Unsere Nachrichten des Tages plus Hintergrundwissen und Unterhaltung.' (English: What happened today? Our News of the day including background information and entertainment.)

=== Einhundert ===
Broadcasting Sundays between 4 and 6 p.m., topics: 'In 100 Minuten erzählen Menschen etwas Bewegendes über sich. Bringen uns zum Lachen oder Weinen, machen uns wütend oder nachdenklich. Oder alles zusammen' (English: in 100 minutes, people narrate what moves them. They make us laugh or cry, make us feel angry or pensive. Sometimes everything at once.)

=== Eine Stunde Film ===
Broadcast on Tuesdays between 8 and 9 p.m. Covers film and TV.

=== Early Bird ===
Saturday Morning Show broadcasting every Saturday between 7 and 10 a.m.

=== Hörsaal ===
Broadcasting Saturdays and Sundays between 6 and 7 p.m., topic: 'wohin uns die Wissenschaft bringt. Was Forscher über unser Leben herausfinden. Welche Antworten sie für unsere Zukunft haben' (English: where science is taking us. What are scientists working at? What answers do they have for our future?)

=== Club der Republik ===
Mainly electronic music.

=== Eine Stunde History ===
Broadcasting Mondays between 8 and 9 p.m., topics: 'Was hat Gestern mit Heute zu tun? Wie Vergangenheit und Zukunft miteinander zusammenhängen' (English: What happened yesterday, that is relevant today? How past and present are connected)

=== Ab 21 ===
Mondays to Fridays between 9 p.m. and midnight. Mainly electronic music.

=== Soundtrack ===
The show's slogan is 'let the music do the talking'

=== Eine Stunde Talk ===
Broadcasting Wednesdays between 8 and 9 p.m., theme: 'Emotional, empathisch, echt. Mit Gästen, die wirklich was zu sagen haben.' (English: emotional, empathetic, real. Including guests who know what they're talking about)

=== Eine Stunde was mit Medien ===
Broadcasting Thursdays between 8 and 9 p.m., topics: 'die wichtigsten Medienthemen der Woche und die Hintergründe dazu' (English: the most important news of the week about media and important background information)

=== Eine Stunde Liebe ===
Broadcasting every Friday between 8 and 9 p.m., theme: 'Wir alle wissen viel über Liebe, Sex und Beziehungen. Aber wir wollen noch mehr wissen' (English: We all know a lot about love, sex and relationships. But we want to know more.)

=== Endlich Samstag ===
Broadcasting Saturdays between 10 a.m. and 2 p.m.

=== Dein Sonntag ===
Sunday Morning Show broadcasting Sundays between 9 and 12 a.m.
