= COSMO (German radio station) =

Germany
- Broadcast area: North Rhine-Westphalia; Bremen; Berlin; Brandenburg; Worldwide

Programming
- Language: German

Ownership
- Operator: Westdeutscher Rundfunk (WDR); Radio Bremen (RB); Rundfunk Berlin-Brandenburg (RBB)

History
- First air date: 30 August 1998 (as Funkhaus Europa)

Links
- Webcast: Listen Live
- Website: cosmoradio.de

COSMO is a German, public radio station owned and operated by the Westdeutscher Rundfunk (WDR), Radio Bremen (RB) and Rundfunk Berlin-Brandenburg (RBB). It is characterised by its engagement with topics from across Earth, aka Cosmos, questions of cultures and features regular broadcasts in different languages.
