= Bremen Zwei =

- Bremen; Germany
- Frequencies: FM: 88.5 MHz (Bremen), 95.4 MHz (Bremerhaven); DAB+: 6D

Programming
- Language: German
- Format: Cultural

Ownership
- Owner: Radio Bremen
- Sister stations: Bremen Eins, Bremen Vier, Bremen Next

History
- First air date: 12 August 2017

Links
- Webcast: Listen Live
- Website: bremenzwei.de

Bremen Zwei is a German public radio station owned and operated by Radio Bremen (RB). It broadcasts a culture and information-based format with a wide music selection, similar to Bayern 2. Unlike other ARD cultural stations, it does not air classical music.

Bremen Zwei replaced Nordwestradio on 12 August 2017.

== Reception ==
The station broadcasts on FM in Bremen on 88.5 MHz at 100 kW; in Bremerhaven on 95.4 MHz at 25 kW, and in both cities via DAB+ (6D). A live stream is available on Bremenzwei.de.
