= Deutschlandfunk Kultur =

German radio station

Coordinates: 52°28′51″N 13°20′14″E

- Berlin; Germany
- Frequencies: DAB+, DVB-S, DVB-C, Internet

Programming
- Language: German
- Format: Culture, speech

Ownership
- Owner: Deutschlandradio
- Sister stations: Deutschlandfunk, Deutschlandfunk Nova, Dokumente und Debatten

History
- First air date: 1 January 1994 (as DeutschlandRadio Berlin)
- Former names: DeutschlandRadio Berlin (1994–2005); Deutschlandradio Kultur (2005–17)

Links
- Website: deutschlandfunkkultur.de

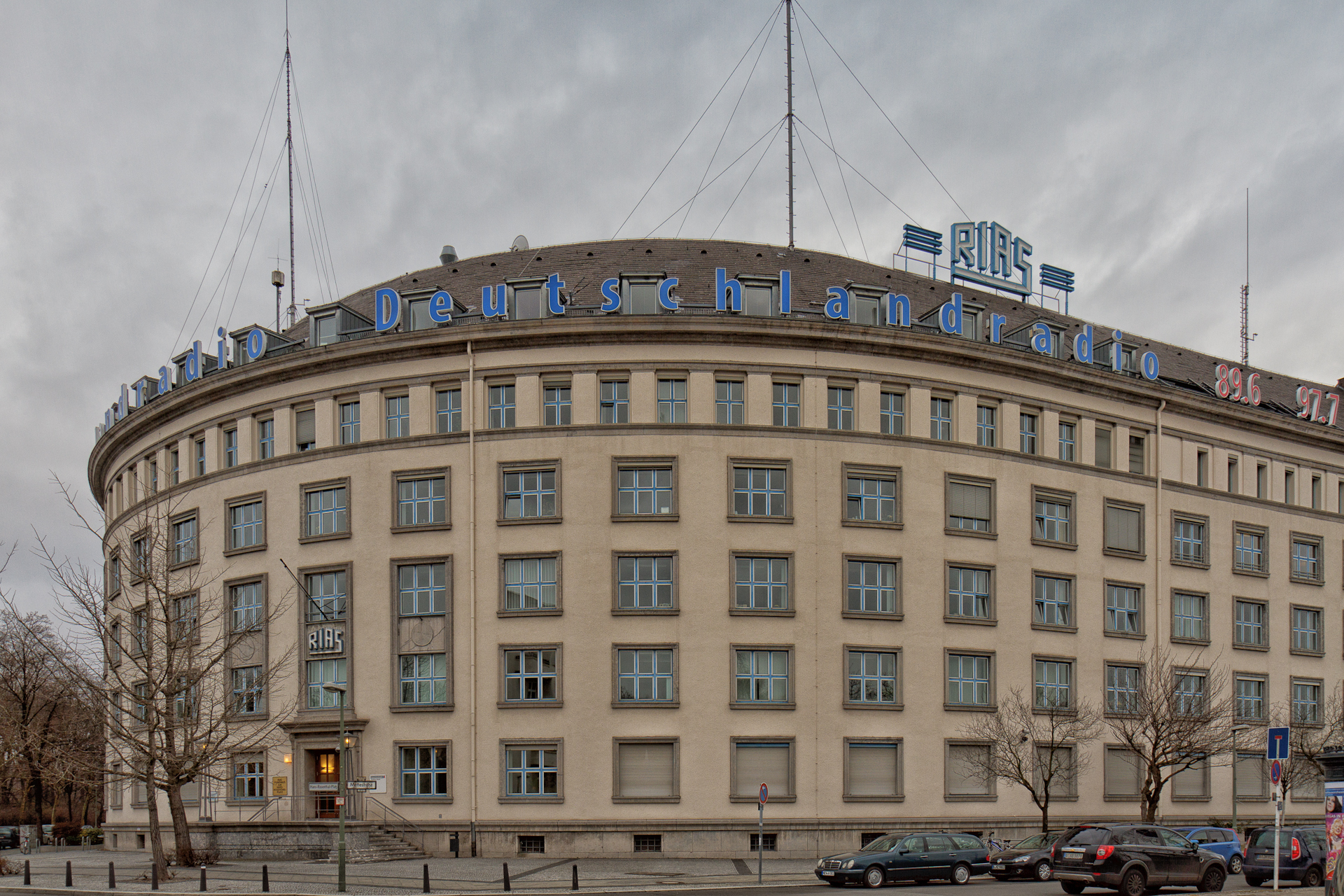
The headquarters of Deutschlandfunk Kultur, formerly the RIAS building, in Berlin

Deutschlandfunk Kultur (DLF Kultur or DKultur; German: [ˈdɔʏtʃlantˌfʊŋk kʊlˈtuːɐ̯]) is a culture-oriented radio station and part of Deutschlandradio (DLR), a set of three national radio stations in Germany. Initially named DeutschlandRadio Berlin, the station was renamed Deutschlandradio Kultur on 1 April 2005. The present name was adopted on 1 May 2017.

The station's studios are in what was the RIAS building at Hans-Rosenthal-Platz in Schöneberg, Berlin.

== History ==
Deutschlandfunk Kultur's roots go back to the first Deutschlandsender, set up in 1926. After World War II, Deutschlandsender became the main national radio station of the German Democratic Republic (GDR), with programming aimed at all of Germany. In the 1970s it was merged with the main Berlin station Berliner Welle and renamed Stimme der DDR - "Voice of the GDR". It lasted until February 1990 when it again became Deutschlandsender, and in May 1990 it merged with Radio DDR 2. The merged entity was named Deutschlandsender Kultur.

In 1994, German broadcasting authorities reorganised radio services of the former GDR and the Federal Republic of Germany. Deutschlandfunk in the west (based in Cologne) and RIAS in Berlin were merged with Deutschlandsender to form Deutschlandradio. In the new structure, Deutschlandfunk became the national information radio station. Deutschlandsender became "DeutschlandRadio Berlin".

On 7 March 2005, DeutschlandRadio Berlin became "Deutschlandradio Kultur".

The name was changed again on 1 May 2017, when the station became "Deutschlandfunk Kultur".

== Programmes ==
Deutschlandfunk Kultur is noted for its radio plays and documentaries. The station's programmes also cover arts, culture, and science. Deutschlandfunk Kultur carries no commercial advertising.

Every Sunday just before midday, the station broadcasts the sound of the Freedom Bell in Berlin along with a reading of part of the Declaration of Independence. The bell was presented by America to the city of Berlin in 1950 as a symbol of anti-communism, and was inspired by the American Liberty Bell. The tradition of broadcasting the bell was originally begun by RIAS, an antecedent of DLF Kultur.

== Transmission technology ==
Deutschlandfunk Kultur is transmitted on FM, DAB+ and DVB-S. The station's longwave broadcasts on 177 kHz from the Oranienburg transmitter ceased on 31 December 2014.

The station's output is livestreamed on the Deutschlandradio website, and individual programmes are available as podcasts.
