= Radio Bremen =

Smallest public radio and television broadcaster in Germany

- Type: Broadcast radio, television and online
- Country: Germany
- Headquarters: Bremen
- Area: Free Hanseatic City of Bremen
- Launch date: 30 November 1924 (as NORAG Bremen); 23 December 1945 (80 years ago) (as Radio Bremen)
- Webcast: Watch and Listen Live
- Official website: www.radiobremen.de

Radio Bremen (pronounced [ˈʁaːdi̯o ˈbʁeːmən]), shortened to RB (pronounced [ɛʁˈbeː]) is the legally mandated broadcaster for the city-state Free Hanseatic City of Bremen (which includes Bremerhaven) in Germany. With its headquarters sited in Bremen, Radio Bremen is a member of the consortium of German public broadcasting organizations, ARD, and is Germany's smallest public radio and television broadcaster.

== History ==
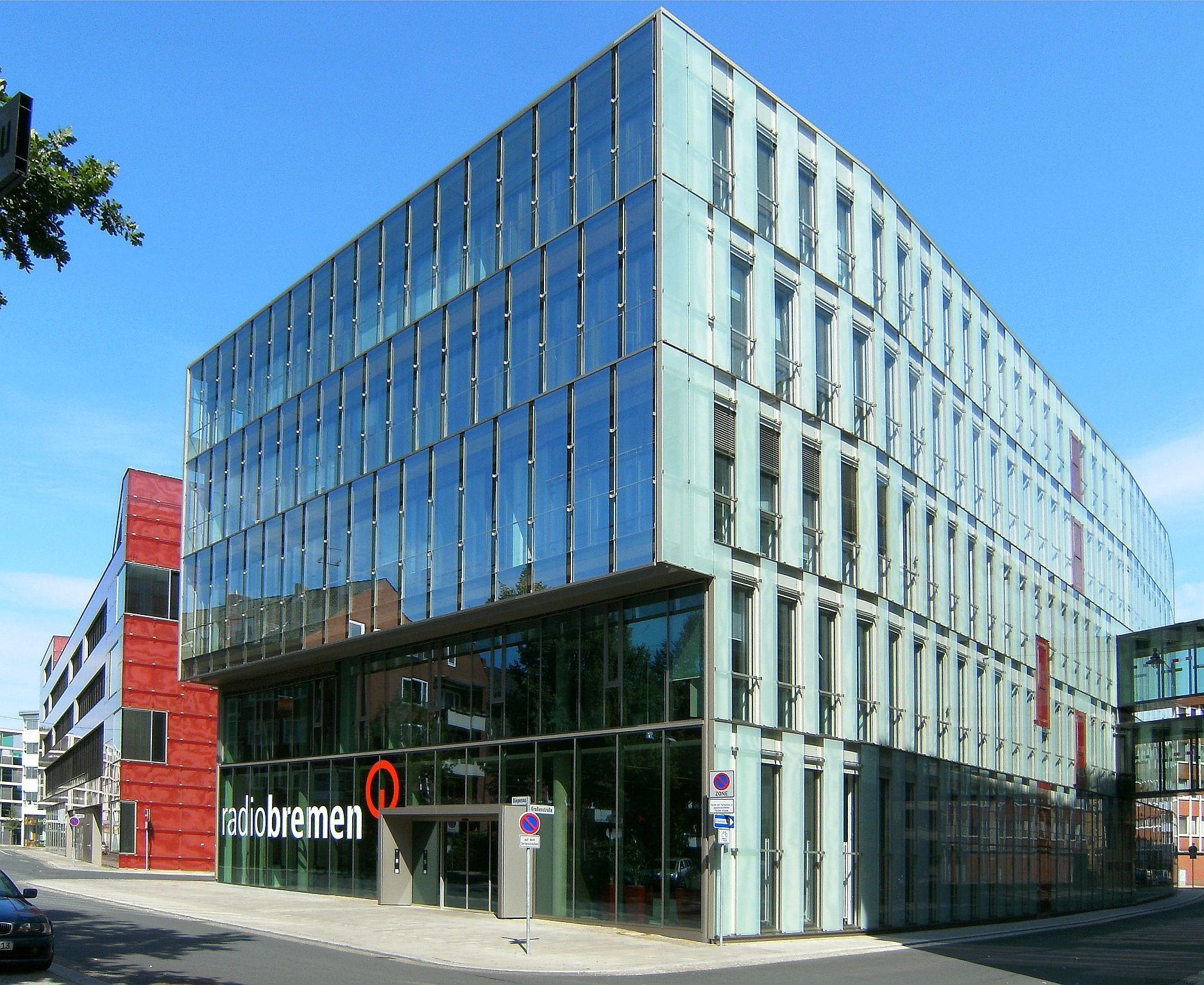
Radio Bremen's headquarters building

In 1922 the "Deutsche Stunde für drahtlose Belehrung und Unterhaltung" (German Hour for Wireless Education and Entertainment) was founded with the participation of Ludwig Roselius. On 2 May 1924 Nordische Rundfunk AG (NORAG) began broadcasting. On 30 November 1924, the "Zwischensender" Bremen was put into operation. It distributed the program from Hamburg and produced daily 3–4 hours program for the NORAG.

After World War II, Radio Bremen began transmitting a daily programme on AM radio on 23 December 1945 under the post-war occupation of Germany by the Allied powers. Although located in an enclave entirely surrounded by the British Zone of occupation, the city of Bremen belonged, together with Bremerhaven, to the American Zone, and radio broadcasting was therefore overseen by the American command. In 1949 Radio Bremen was chartered to be the public broadcaster serving the city-state Free Hanseatic City of Bremen and became a founding member of ARD in 1950. Some notable people like Loriot and Jan Böhmermann spent significant parts of their careers at Radio Bremen.

== Organization and finances ==
=== Chairmen of Radio Bremen ===
- 1946–1957: Walter Geerdes
- 1957–1968: Heinz Kerneck
- 1968–1973: Hans Abich
- 1973–1974: Klaus Bölling
- 1974–1985: Gerhard Schröder
- 1985–1999: Karl-Heinz Klostermeier
- 1999–2009: Heinz Glässgen
- 2009–present: Jan Metzger

=== Finances ===
Every household in Germany is required by law to pay a Rundfunkbeitrag (broadcast contribution) of €18.36 per month as of August 2021, to finance the public broadcast system. The fee is collected by Beitragsservice von ARD, ZDF und Deutschlandradio.

== Programming ==
=== Television ===
Radio Bremen produces and provides programmes for the nationwide television network Das Erste, the main national public TV channel.

Radio Bremen, together with NDR and the former SFB, began broadcasting a regional network on 4 January 1965. The name of the network was originally "Nord 3" ("North 3"), later renamed "Norddeutsches Fernsehen N 3" ("North German Television N3"). Since December 2001 the network has been known as "NDR Fernsehen" ("North German Broadcasting: Television"). As of that change, and until 2005, Radio Bremen productions carried their own logo when transmitted on the network. On 1 January 2005 Radio Bremen began its own regional station: "Radio Bremen TV" (RB-TV). Besides the regional programming, cooperation with NDR continues. Radio Bremen and NDR produce a combined teletext service called NDR-Text. Until December 2001 it was known by the name "Nord-Text" ("North-Text").

=== Radio ===
Radio Bremen originates and transmits four radio networks, as listed below:

- Bremen Eins (Bremen One) – a station geared to adults, consisting mostly of oldies, along with daily news in the local dialect, known as "Bremer Platt".
- Bremen Zwei (Bremen Two) – a cultural and current affairs programme.
- Bremen Vier (Bremen Four) – a youth-oriented station, consisting of current hits, geared to the present day youth.
- Bremen Next – another youth oriented station, consisting of current urban, R&B and electronica, geared to a sightly younger audience than Bremen Vier.

Until 12 August 2017, Radio Bremen produced Nordwestradio (Northwest Radio) in conjunction with NDR, although the station was only transmitted over transmitters in Bremen and Bremerhaven. After that date, the station reverted to an exclusive operation of Radio Bremen as Bremen Zwei. Radio Bremen also co-produces the Cosmo radio station, targeted at migrant communities. It is produced with WDR and RBB.

== Transmitters ==
The FM and TV signals (including DVB-T) are broadcast in Bremen from the Bremen-Walle Telecommunication Tower, which is operated by Deutsche Telekom. The transmitter for Bremerhaven is located on the Telecommunication Tower in Schiffdorf and also operated by Deutsche Telekom.

Radio Bremen transmitted on 936 kHz medium wave until 13 March 2010 using the mediumwave transmitter at Leher Field. Radio Bremen also formerly transmitted its first programme on 6190 kHz shortwave. All AM transmissions are now defunct.

== See also ==
- Television in Germany
