= Kai Diekmann =

German journalist (born 1964)

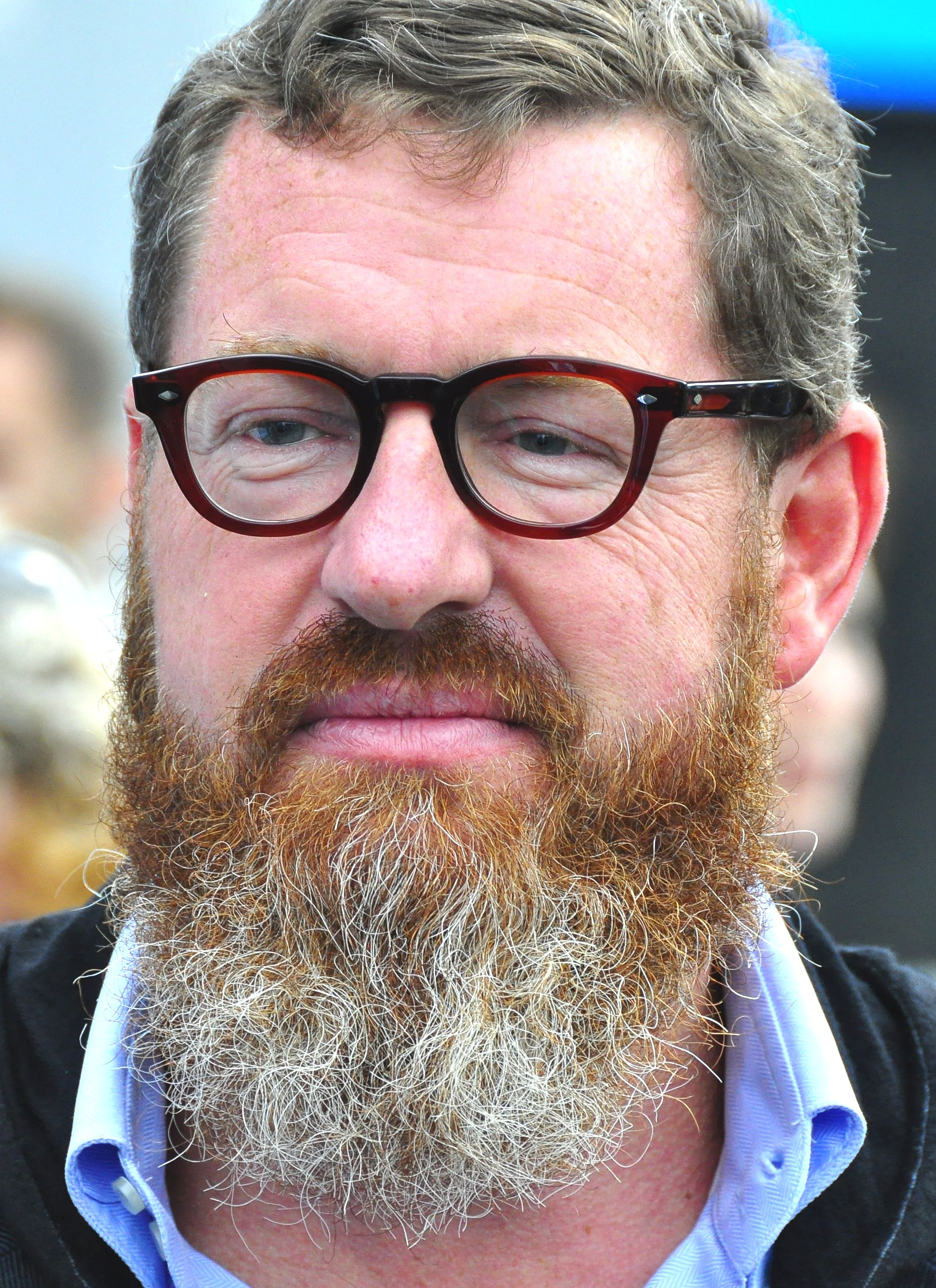
Diekmann in September 2014

Kai Diekmann (born 27 June 1964 in Ravensburg) is a German businessman and former journalist. From 1998 until 2000 he was editor of Welt am Sonntag (English: World on Sunday). From January 2001 to December 2015 he was chief editor of Bild.

== Life ==
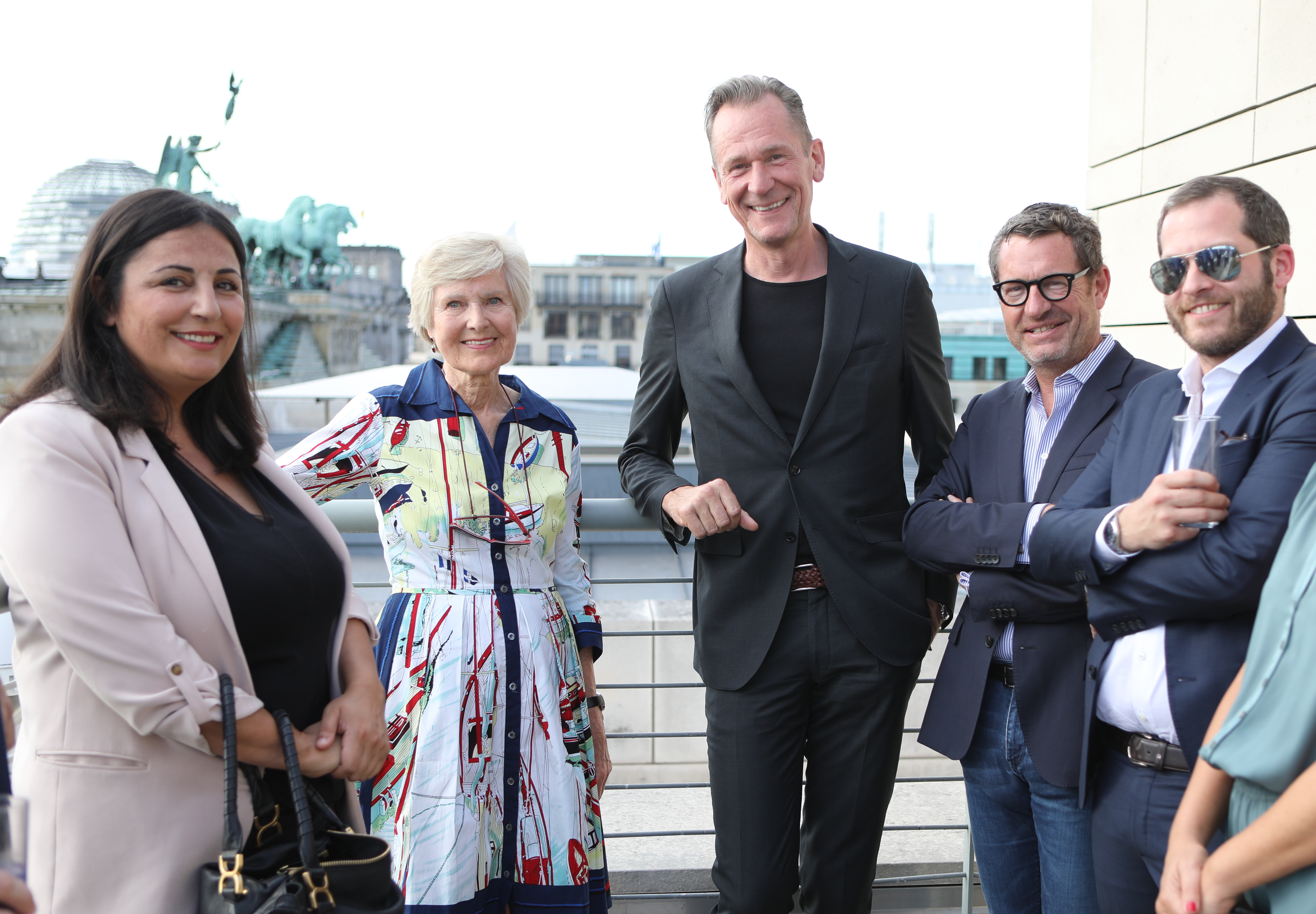
Friede Springer, Mathias Döpfner, Kai Diekmann and Julian Reichelt on the roof of the US Embassy in Berlin (2019)

Diekmann grew up in Bielefeld. After his Abitur (or matura) exam and mandatory military service, which he completed on the editorial staff of a military newspaper, he studied at the University of Münster. There he became a member of the Burschenschaft Franconia. He interrupted his studies in 1985 when he began his Volontariat (roughly: traineeship) at the Axel Springer AG through the Axel Springer Journalist School, from which he quickly began a career for the publisher, beginning as a correspondent in Bonn.

From 1989-1991 he was the chief reporter for the Hubert Burda Media-published illustrated Bunte, a weekly featuring articles on celebrities, gossip, and lifestyle. After a short detour at the Ullstein-Verlag-published tabloid B.Z., in 1992 he transferred to Bild, the best-selling daily newspaper in Germany known for sensationalist news stories. In 1992, he became editor of Welt am Sonntag, and in 2001 returned to Bild where he became editor. Since 2004, in addition to being editor, he is also the publisher of Bild as well as Bild am Sonntag. In March 2004, the first volume of the definitive memoirs of former Bundeskanzler Helmut Kohl was published, edited by Diekmann.

In 2017, Diekmann became a consultant to the American company Uber. He was appointed to the "Public policy advisory board"; Diekmann's task includes, advising the company on political issues. The members of the committee meet once a year and usually receive company shares instead of payment. A few weeks after Diekmann was hired, the Springer SEs investment in Uber became public.

Diekmann founded the public relations agency "Storymachine" in 2017 with Michael Mronz and the former editor-in-chief of Stern.de Philipp Jessen.

In November 2017, Diekmann and his childhood friend, ex-investment banker Leonhard Fischer, announced plans for a "digital asset management" that would collect and manage around 20 billion euros from private investors. The project, called the "Future Fund", was officially launched at the end of May 2018.

Diekmann is a member of the Atlantik-Brücke, an organization that aims to further relationships between Germany and especially the United States. He was also a member of the executive board of the Turkish daily Hürriyet between 2004 and 2018.

== Lawsuits ==
Kai Diekmann sued the Berlin daily Die Tageszeitung, after, on 8 May 2002, the paper's satire page "Die Wahrheit" (The Truth) claimed that he had sought an operation to use parts of corpses to enlarge his allegedly extremely small penis. Diekmann sued the paper for 30,000 Euro in damages for illegal violations of his privacy as well as libel and defamation of character. A Berlin court ruled that there was indeed negligence on the part of the newspaper, but denied the monetary compensation demanded by Diekmann saying that, as editor of Bild, he "consciously seeks economic advantage from the violation of others' privacy" and therefore "is less heavily burdened by the violation of his own privacy," and furthermore that he should "assume that those standards that he lays on others are also of importance for himself." An appeal against the ruling was given no chance of success by the higher court and both sides withdrew their appeals.

== Family ==
From 1995 until 1997 Diekmann was married to Jonica Jahr, the daughter of Hamburg publisher John Jahr, Jr. On 28 January 2002 he married Bild columnist Katja Kessler, with former Chancellor of Germany Helmut Kohl serving as his best man. Diekmann and Kessler have four children, Yella, Caspar, Kolja and Lilly.

== Publications ==
- Kai Diekmann, Hat die christliche Botschaft keinen Platz mehr in den Medien? Referate und Stellungnahmen bei einer Medientagung zum 25jährigen Jubiläum der Nachrichtenagentur Idea. Wetzlar: Evangelische Nachrichtenagentur, 1995. ISSN 1614-502X
- Helmut Kohl (Kai Diekmann, Ralf G. Reuth, eds.), Ich wollte Deutschlands Einheit. Berlin: Ullstein, 2000. ISBN 3-548-36264-8
- Kai Diekmann, Der große Selbstbetrug: Wie wir um unsere Zukunft gebracht werden. 3rd ed. Munich: Piper, 2007. ISBN 978-3-492-05122-4
- Kai Diekmann, Süper Freunde: Was Türken und Deutsche sich wirklich zu sagen haben. Munich, Piper, 2008. ISBN 978-3-492-05255-9
- Kai Diekmann, Die Mauer: Fotografien 1961 - 1992. Fackelträger, 2009. ISBN 978-3-7716-4430-7
- Kai Diekmann, Die längste Nacht, der größte Tag: Deutschland am 9. November 1989. Munich, Piper, 2009. ISBN 978-3-492-05336-5

== Awards ==
- Goldene Feder 2000, 2005
- World Media Award 2002
- Blogger Newcomer of the Year, 2009
- Media Man of the Year, 2009

== See also ==
- Friede sei mit Dir
