= Döpfner =

Döpfner is a surname. Notable people with the surname include:

- Julius Döpfner (1913–1976), German cardinal of Roman Catholic Church
- Mathias Döpfner (born 1963), German business executive and journalist
