= Friede sei mit Dir =

Relief sculpture in Berlin, Germany

Coordinates: 52.5066°N 13.3917°E

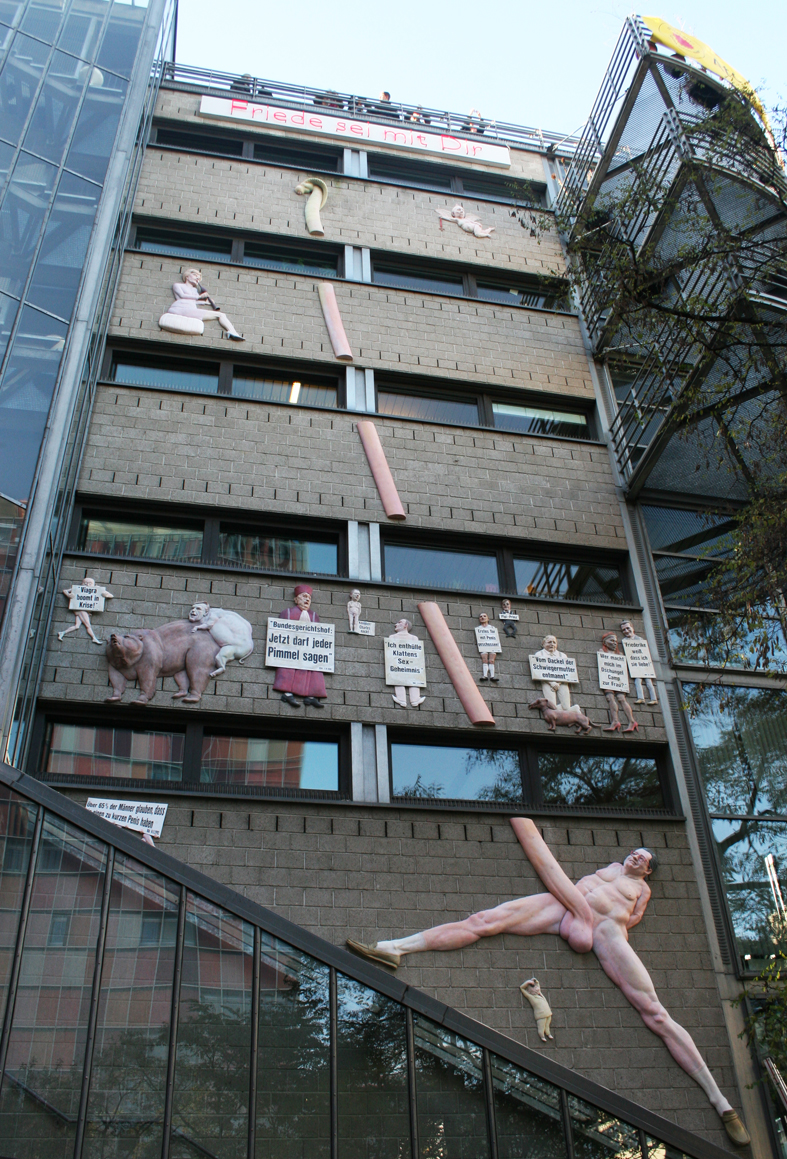
Overall view of the sculpture

The relief sculpture Friede sei mit Dir (German: [ˈfʁiːdə ˌzaɪ ˈmɪt ˌdiːɐ̯], ‘peace be with you’) is an artwork by sculptor Peter Lenk. It is located in the Rudi Dutschke street in Berlin at the former building of the editorial staff of German newspaper taz.

The sculpture displays living persons who were involuntarily used in controversial headlines by newspaper Bild. The main part is a caricature of former Bild editor-in-chief Kai Diekmann with a comically enlarged penis stretched over five floors. The title on the top floor, "Friede sei mit Dir", is a double entendre: either "Peace be with you" or "Friede be with you", the latter referring to Bild's publisher Friede Springer who is depicted on the left-hand side of the fourth-floor façade snake-charming.

The sculpture's background is a satirical article and the ensuing lawsuit. In 2002, journalist Gerhard Henschel claimed that Kai Diekmann had undergone a failed penis enlargement operation. Dieckmann sued, unsuccessfully, for damages to his personality rights. The court held that the claimant, in his function as chief editor of Bild, had willingly decided to become an actor in a personality-rights-infringing business from which he was profiting economically, and therefore was not entitled to maximum protection against infringement of his own rights.

The sculpture itself was installed in 2009 and remains legally unchallenged.
