= Pucnik =

Pucnik Simsdorf
- Village
- Location within Poland
- Coordinates: 50°36′36″N 17°50′57″E
- Country: Poland
- Voivodeship: Opole
- County: Opole
- Gmina: Komprachcice
- Village: Domecko
- Time zone: UTC+1 (CET)
  - Summer (DST): UTC+2 (CEST)
- Vehicle registration: OPO

Pucnik [ˈput͡snik] (German: Simsdorf) is a part (przysiółek) of the village of Domecko in the administrative district of Gmina Komprachcice, within Opole County, Opole Voivodeship, in southern Poland.
