= Julian Reichelt =

German journalist (born 1980)

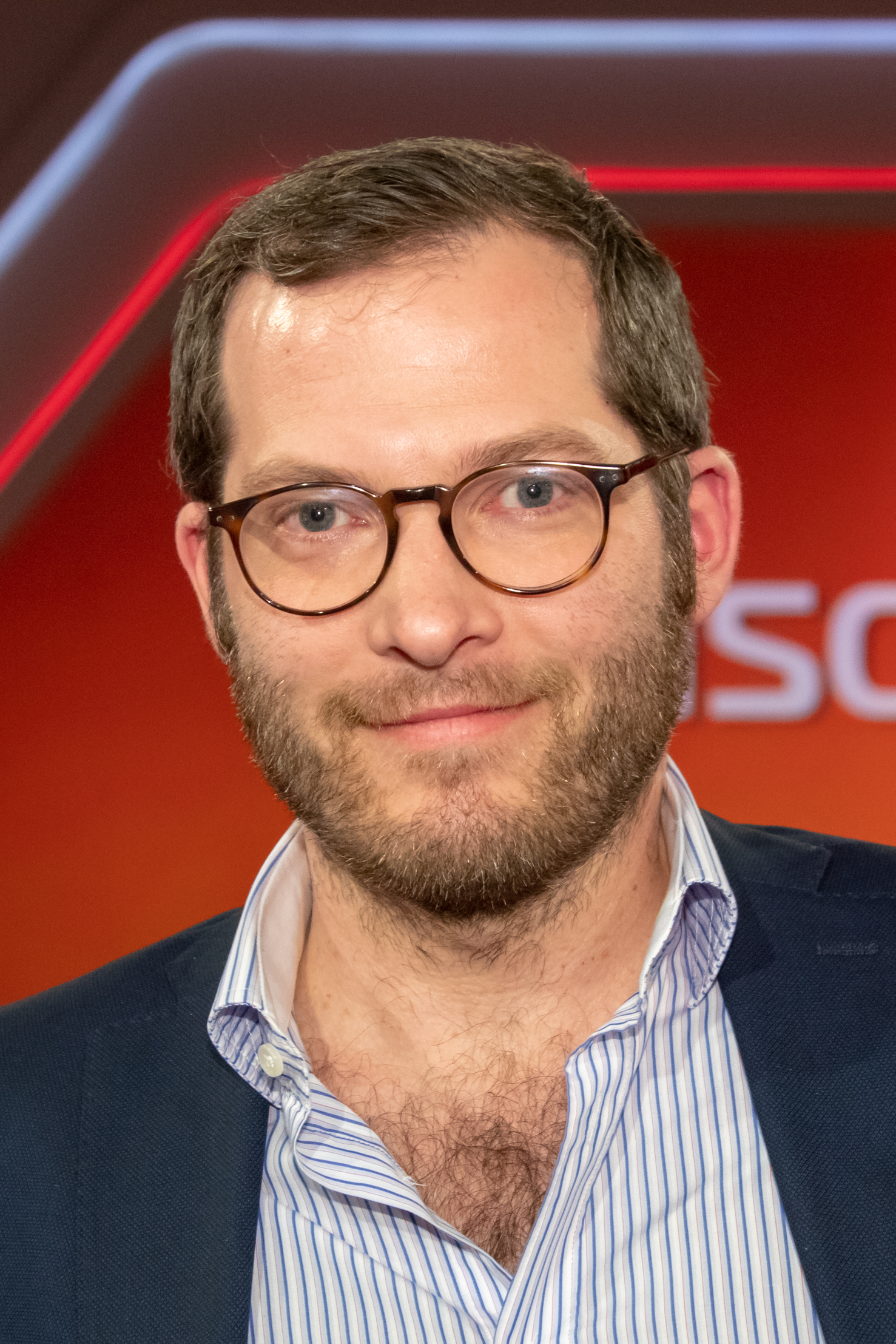
- Reichelt in 2018
- Born: 15 June 1980 (age 46); Hamburg, West Germany
- Education: Axel-Springer-Academy
- Occupation: Journalist
- Years active: 2002–present
- Notable credit: Editor-in-chief of Bild

Julian Reichelt (born 15 June 1980) is a German journalist. He is editor-in-chief of right-wing populist news-site "Nius".

From February 2017 to October 2021, he was chairman of the editors-in-chief and digital editor-in-chief of Bild, Germany's largest and highest-circulation tabloid.

== Early life ==
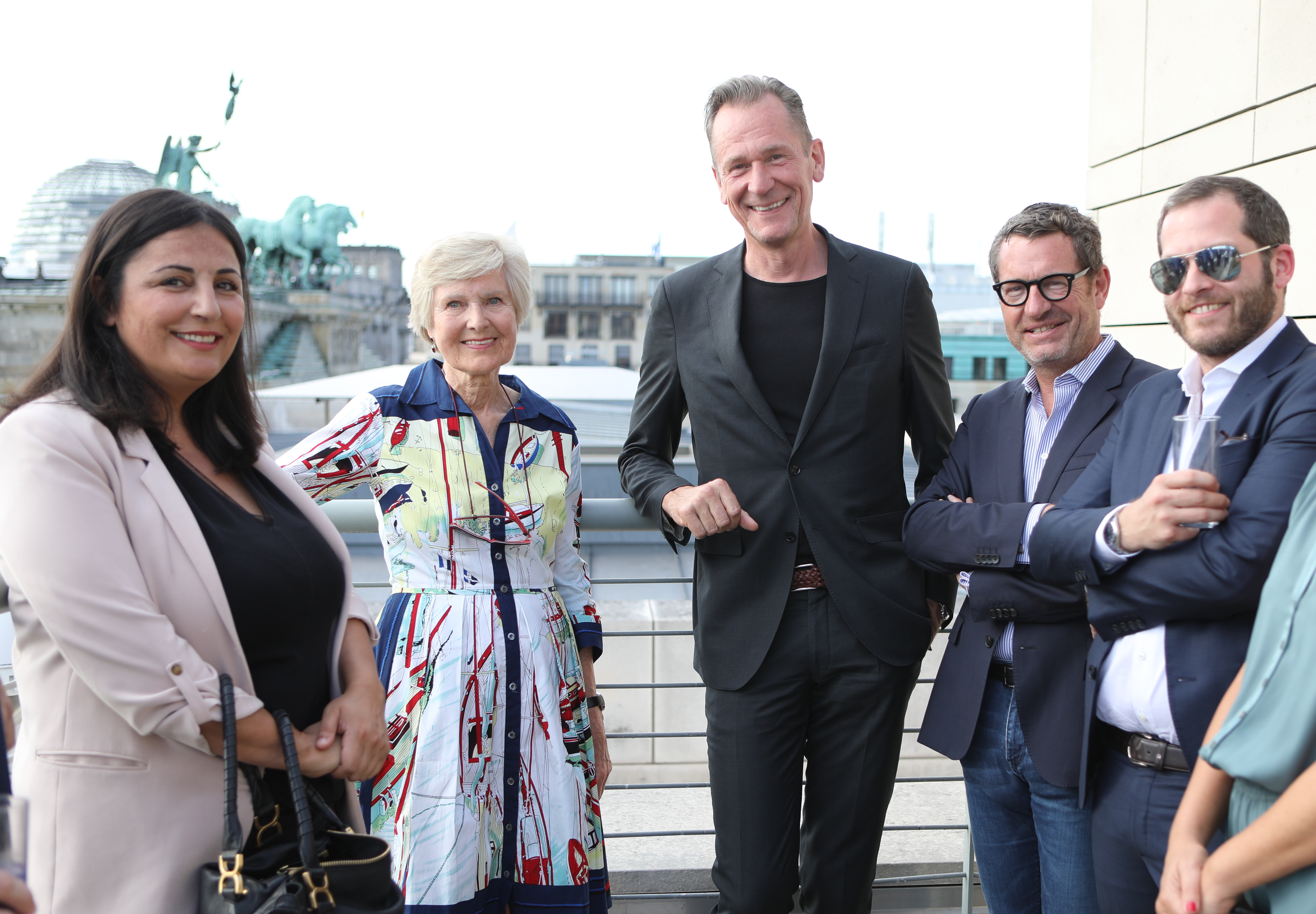
Friede Springer, Mathias Döpfner, Kai Diekmann and Julian Reichelt on the roof of the US Embassy in Berlin (2019)

Julian Reichelt was born in Hamburg in 1980 and grew up in the district of Othmarschen. His mother, Katrin Reichelt, works as a freelance journalist on medical topics including homeopathy. His father, Hans-Heinrich Reichelt, was an editor of the Berlin edition of Bild and works as a freelance journalist. The couple founded a publishing house for medical journalism and GLOBULIX.net, a homeopathy-themed website. Reichelt attended Othmarschen Gymnasium, and graduated in 2000. From 2002 to 2003, he worked as a trainee for Bild before completing his training as a journalist at the Axel-Springer-Akademie.

== Career ==
Reichelt reported from Afghanistan, Georgia, Thailand, Iraq, Sudan, and Lebanon partly as a war correspondent, and worked as a culinary reporter in 2007. Starting in February 2014, Reichelt served as the editor-in-chief of Bild's digital division as successor to Manfred Hart. In February 2017 he succeeded Kai Diekmann as chairman of the editors-in-chief of Bild.

In August 2015, Reichelt was barred from reporting from the trial of alleged Islamic State fighters at the Higher Regional Court of Celle, after he published unpixellated photos of the defendants, a violation of German privacy law.

In February 2016, the German Press Agency criticized Bild´s misrepresentation of Russian military operations in Syria, after it published an article headlined "Putin and Assad bomb on". The Agency accused Bild of untruthfully claiming that Russia had broken a ceasefire. Reichelt claimed that the Agency had "made itself the stooge of Kremlin propaganda".

=== Sexual harassment allegations and legal issues ===
In March 2021, a report by Spiegel announced that Reichelt would have to face an in-house investigation. Among other things, it described a "Reichelt system", where Reichelt used his position within the tabloid to conduct illicit relationships with younger female employees, among other accusations. In response, Bild publisher Axel Springer SE released a statement explaining that it was investigating "accusations of abuse of power in connection with consensual relationships and drug consumption in the workplace." In March 2021, Reichelt acknowledged having "mixed professional and private relationships".

On October 17, 2021, The New York Times published a report on Bild, in connection to Axel Springer SE's recent acquisition of Politico. It summarized claims of a toxic workplace environment at Bild, where young female employees were promoted or demoted within the tabloid based on their responses to Reichelt's advances. The article also revealed that Reichelt had forged divorce papers to win over female employees, and paid at least one employee 5,000 Euros in hush money to not discuss the matter. Following the report, Reichelt was fired from his post as chairman of the editors-in-chief.

=== Time after Springer ===
From July 2022, Reichelt began the show ""Achtung, Reichelt!" on YouTube. The show, along with other projects of Reichelt's is financed by Frank Gotthardt, a businessman with close ties to the CDU.

"Achtung, Reichelt!" is also distributed on Nius, likewise financed by Gotthardt, and as a podcast. Several of Nius' reporters were formerly employed at Bild.

In 2024, the operating company of Nius, Vius SE, applied to the Berlin-Brandenburg State Media Authority (MABB) for approval for a nationwide television and radio program.

On 13 November 2026, Reichelt's car was set on fire, with Reichelt believing it was a targeted attack.

== Recognition ==
- Axel-Springer-Prize for young journalists in the category Supraregional / National Contributions for his report from Afghanistan "You can kill us, but never defeat us", published in two parts on 12 and 13 October 2007 in Bild (2008).
- In 2018, Reichelt was awarded the "Golden Potato", a parody award for journalists who "present a distorted image of race relations in the immigration nation of Germany". Reichelt attended the ceremony but turned down the award, claiming that the word "potato" had become a term of racial abuse against ethnic Germans.

== Publications ==
- Reichelt, Julian (2010). Kriegsreporter ich will von den Menschen erzählen (in German). Köln: Fackelträger. ISBN 978-3-404-61669-5. OCLC 663506893.
- Reichelt, Julian; Meyer, Jan (2010). Ruhet in Frieden, Soldaten! wie Politik und Bundeswehr die Wahrheit über Afghanistan vertuschten (in German). Köln: Fackelträger. ISBN 978-3-7716-4466-6. OCLC 646132879.
