= ID–WithoutColors =

- Directed by: Riccardo Valsecchi
- Written by: Riccardo Valsecchi
- Screenplay by: Riccardo Valsecchi
- Produced by: Migrationsrat Berlin-Brandenburg
- Cinematography: Riccardo Valsecchi
- Edited by: Riccardo Valsecchi
- Music by: Riccardo Valsecchi; Kamikaze Queens; Les Robots Musiques; Alchemy reloaded
- Distributed by: Migrationsrat Berlin-Brandenburg
- Release date: 13 June 2013 (Germany)
- Running time: 29 minutes
- Country: Germany
- Languages: German; English
- Budget: 2100 €

ID–WithoutColors is a 2013 German documentary film by Riccardo Valsecchi produced by the Migrationsrat Berlin-Brandenburg. The film follows the 2012 sentence of the administrative court of Koblenz, Western Germany, which on February 27, dismissed a complaint by a black German man who was asked to show his papers while traveling by train. The judges ruled that skin color was reasonable grounds on which to carry out ID checks. The sentence confirmed for the first time the existence and practice of racial profiling in Germany since World War II. The film follows the works of such associations as KOP-Berlin, ISDB, Reach Out, Gangway Neukölln, which work in this field in Berlin, as well as it gives voices to activists, victims, policemen and politicians, analyzing deeply the psychological aspects of the practice of racial profiling on the victims.

== Reception ==
The film was initially boycotted by all the German festivals and media. After having won the 2013 Sardinia Film Festival and being successfully shown at various manifestations and events in the underground German network as well as during workshops and events organized by associations working on racial issues, some German media as die Tageszeitung reviewed it. In November 2013 the film was awarded with the prestigious Respekt Gewinnt Preis for the best project for the development of the democracy in Berlin. Since Mai 2014 it is available on DVD.

== Awards ==
- 2013: Respekt Gewinnt Preis, Ratschlag für Demokratie in Berlin
- 2013: Best Italian Documentary Film, Sardinia Film Festival
- 2013: Best project voted by Internet jury, Quartiermeister
