= Ines Pohl =

German journalist

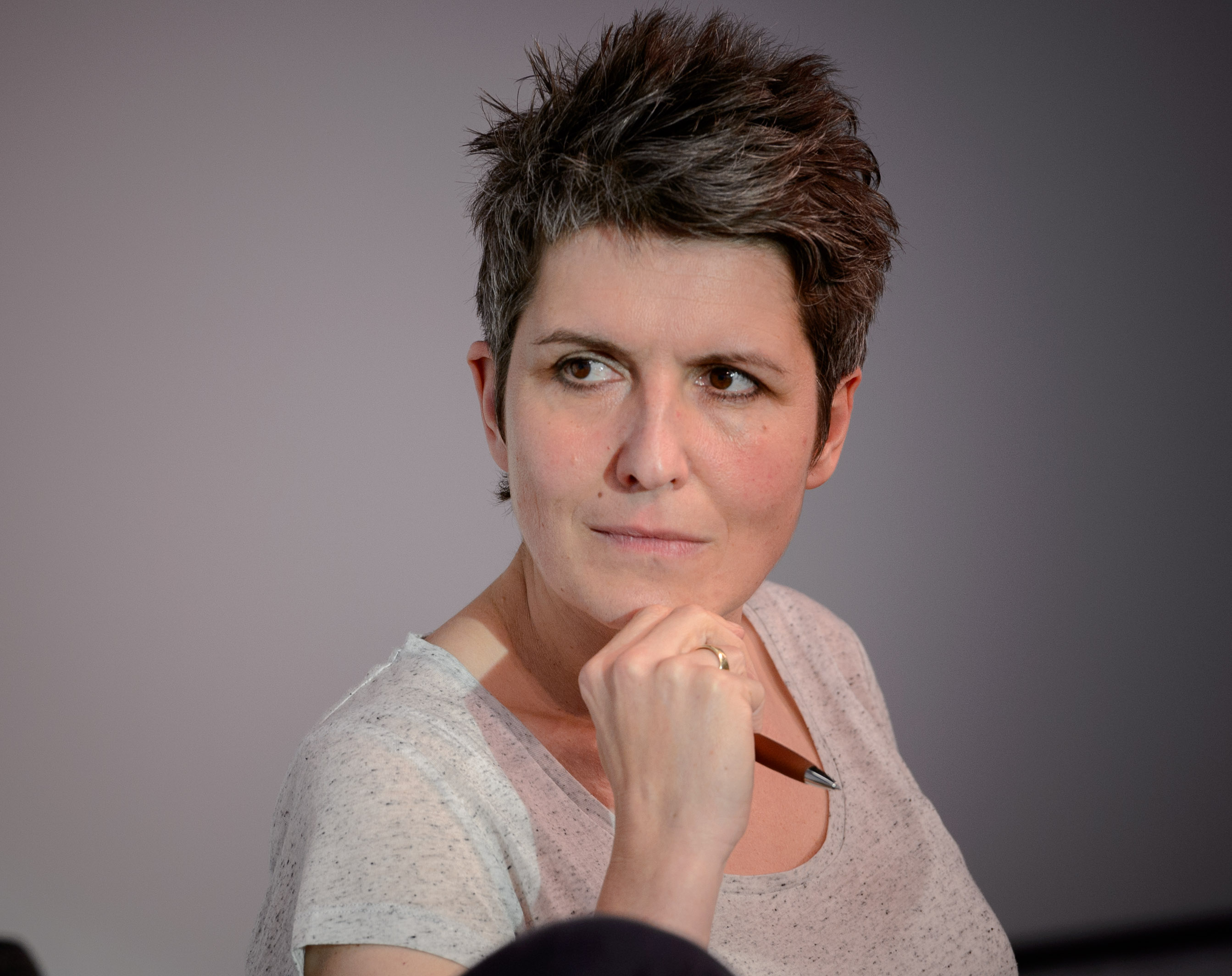
- Born: 12 April 1967 (age 59); Mutlangen, Baden-Württemberg, West Germany
- Occupation: Journalist

Ines Pohl (born 12 April 1967, in Mutlangen, Baden-Württemberg) is a German journalist. She was editor-in-chief of the left-wing newspaper Die Tageszeitung from 2009 until 2015. In 2016 Pohl joined German international broadcaster Deutsche Welle, where she worked as Washington correspondent and was appointed editor-in-chief in March 2017.

== Early life and education ==
Pohl grew up in rural Swabia (East Württemberg) as the daughter of a kindergarten teacher (mother) and a skilled labour worker (father). After graduating high school (German Abitur) in Schwäbisch Gmünd, she studied German studies and Scandinavian studies at the University of Göttingen. In the early and mid-1980s, as a school girl and a young student, Pohl was actively involved in the German peace movement, specifically in the protest against the stationing of MGM-31 Pershing missiles at a United States Armed Forces Missile Storage Area at Mutlanger Heide ("Mutlangen heathland") near her hometown (as part of the NATO Double-Track Decision).

== Career and private life ==
In the 1990s, Pohl worked as a freelance journalist at a local radio station as well as for several regional newspapers; she did her traineeship at Hessische/Niedersächsische Allgemeine (HNA) newspaper. There, she was gradually promoted up the ranks, being leading editor for politics within ten years.

In 2004/2005, Pohl spent a year at Harvard University on a scholarship of the Nieman Foundation for Journalism.

In 2008, Pohl went to Berlin to work as a correspondent for the Ippen publishing house. From July 2009 until September 2015 she was editor in chief of the left-wing newspaper Die Tageszeitung. During her time at the newspaper, her brief was to return the paper to its left-wing roots after a much-criticised foray into more popular journalism.

In 2016, Pohl joined German international broadcaster Deutsche Welle in 2015, where she worked as Washington correspondent. Soon after, she was appointed editor-in-chief, from 1 March 2017.

Pohl lives with her wife in Berlin.

== Other activities ==
- Jugend gegen AIDS, Member of the Advisory Board
- International Journalists' Programmes, Member of the Board of Trustees
- Reporters Without Borders Germany, Member of the Board of Trustees (2010–2016)

== Recognition ==
In 2009, Pohl was awarded the prize "Best journalist of the year" in the category "newcomer" by the Medium Magazine.
