= Ochodze =

Ochodze Ochotz
- Village
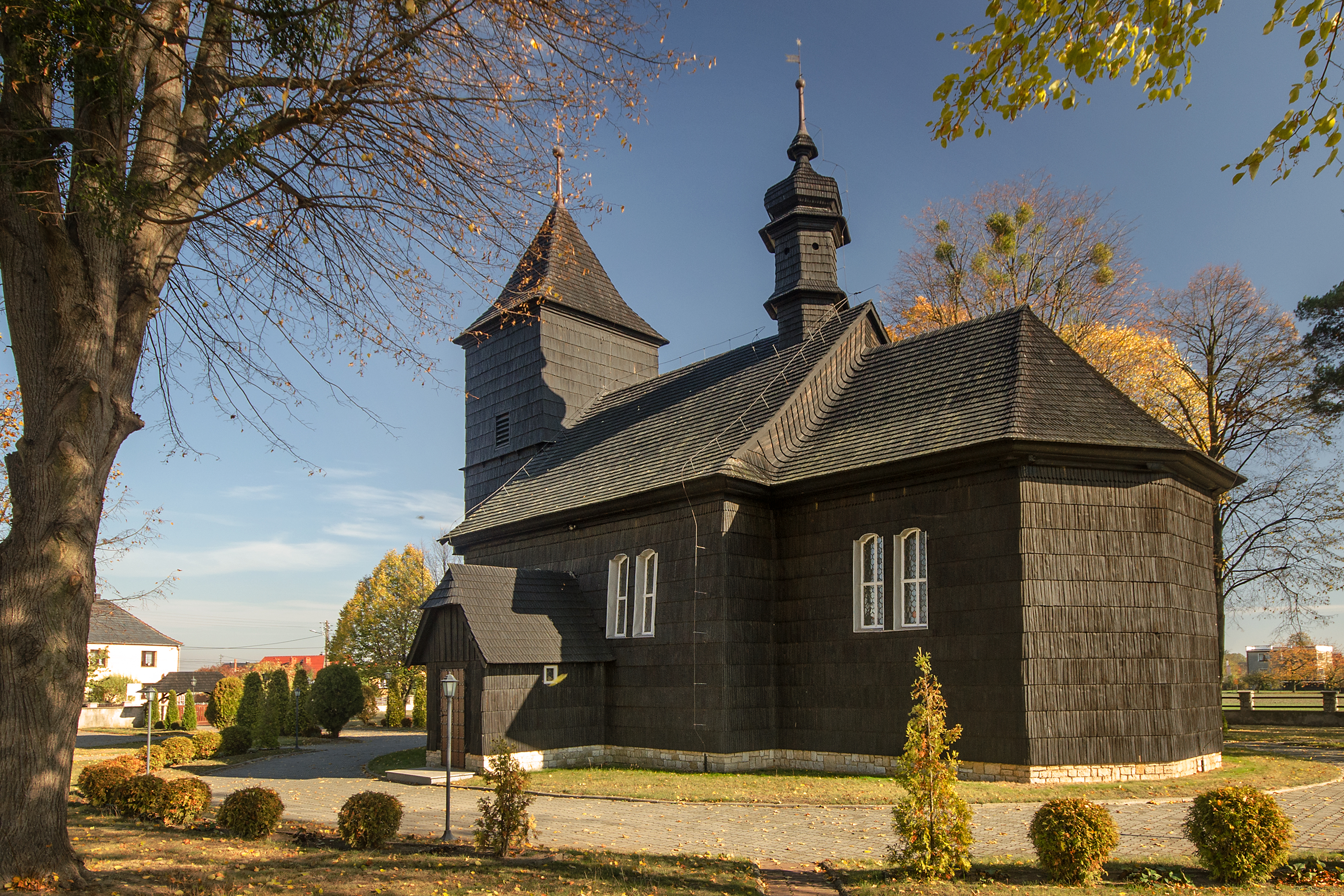
- Saint Martin church in Ochodze

- Location within Poland
- Coordinates: 50°37′N 17°49′E
- Country: Poland
- Voivodeship: Opole
- County: Opole
- Gmina: Komprachcice
- First mentioned: 1295

Population
  - Total: 1,200
- Time zone: UTC+1 (CET)
  - Summer (DST): UTC+2 (CEST)
- Vehicle registration: OPO

Ochodze [ɔˈxɔd͡zɛ] is a village in the administrative district of Gmina Komprachcice, within Opole County, Opole Voivodeship, in southern Poland.
