= Polska Nowa Wieś =

Polska Nowa Wieś Polnisch Neudorf
- Village
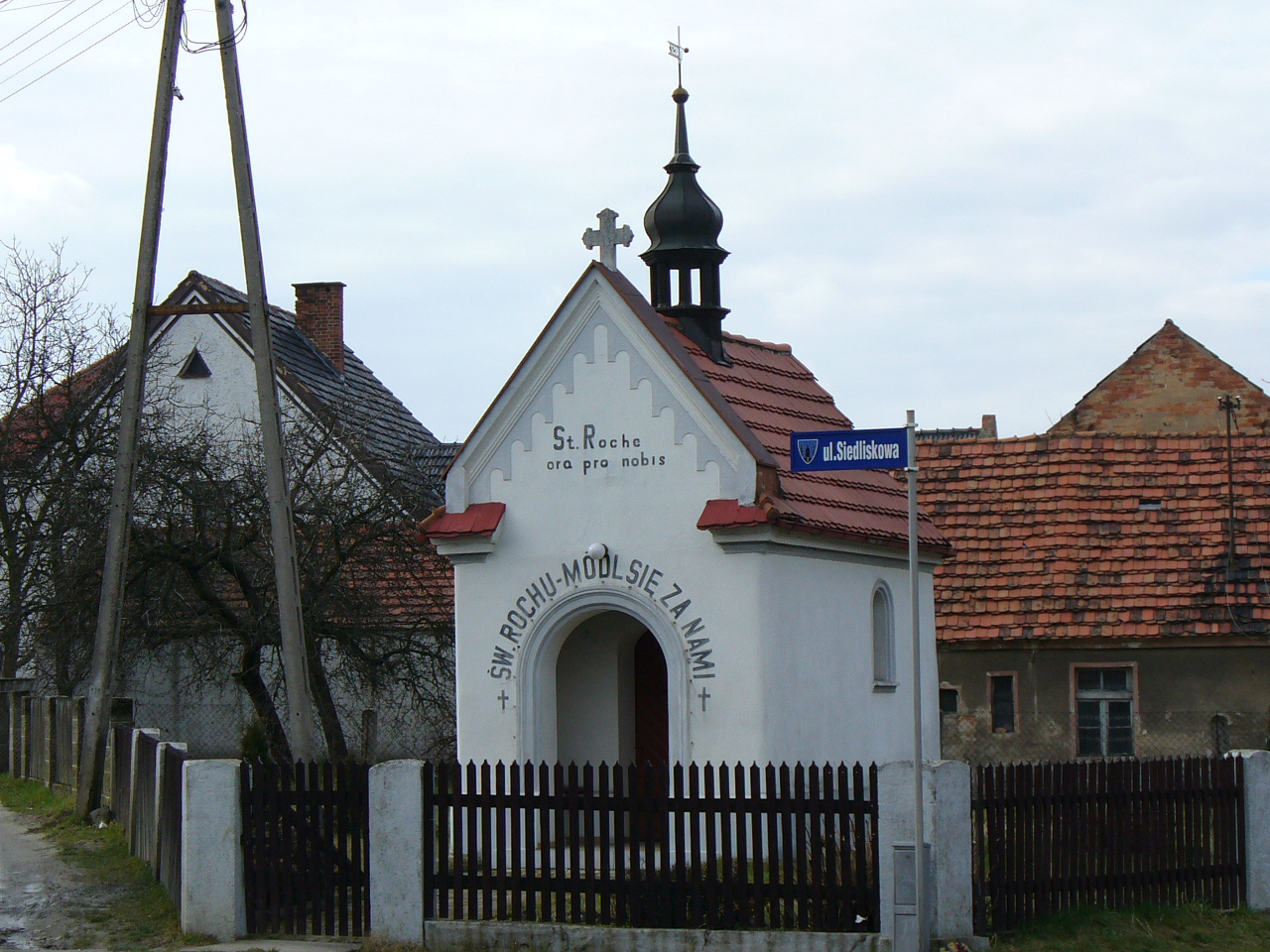
- Saint Roch Chapel

- Location within Poland
- Coordinates: 50°39′N 17°47′E
- Country: Poland
- Voivodeship: Opole
- County: Opole
- Gmina: Komprachcice

Population
  - Total: 1,858
- Time zone: UTC+1 (CET)
  - Summer (DST): UTC+2 (CEST)
- Vehicle registration: OPO

Polska Nowa Wieś [ˈpɔlska ˈnɔva ˈvjɛɕ] is a village in the administrative district of Gmina Komprachcice, within Opole County, Opole Voivodeship, in southern Poland.

There is a German minority living in the village. Since 2009 the village has the additional German name "Polnisch Neudorf", which was used before the year 1914. Notable is that the name "Neudorf in Oberschlesien" was not used, even if the name change was before 1933–45.
