= Bascha Mika =

German journalist and publicist

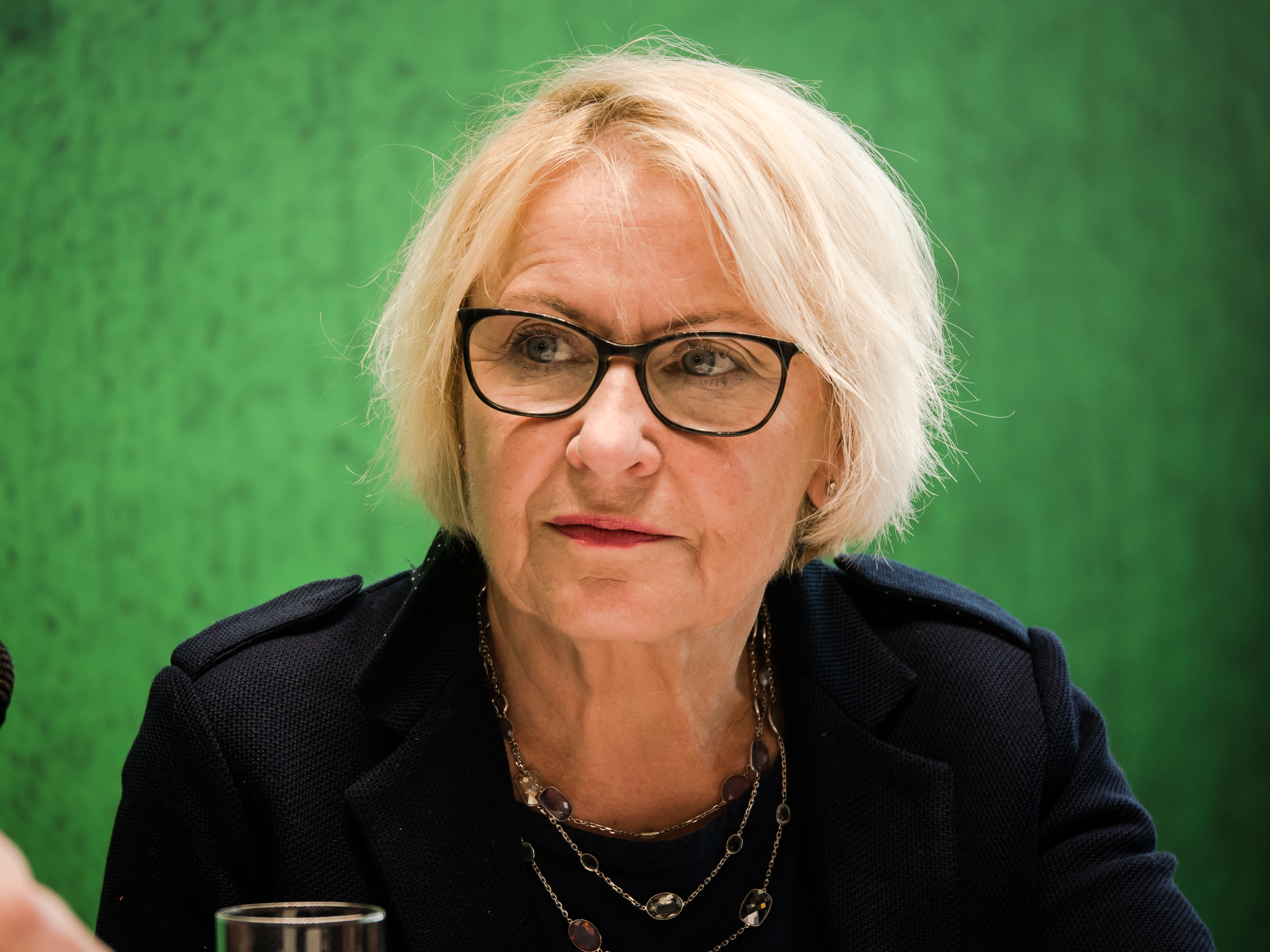
- Mika at the Frankfurt Book Fair in 2017
- Born: 17 January 1954 (age 72); Komprachcice, Upper Silesia, Poland
- Occupations: Journalist and editor

Bascha Mika (born 17 January 1954) is a German journalist and publicist. From 1998 to July 2009, she was editor-in-chief of Die Tageszeitung and has held the same post at Frankfurt Rundschau since April 2014. At Die Tageszeitung, Mika was the only female editor-in-chief of a national newspaper in Germany.

== Biography ==
Born Barbara Mika in Komprachcice, near Opole in Upper Silesia in 1954, her family moved to Aachen in West Germany in 1959. Mika completed a bank apprenticeship after graduating from school. She spent three years working in Deutsche Bank in Aachen. Mike then went to University in Bonn and Marburg, where she studied Africa, philosophy, German and ethnology. During college Mika worked in radio and various newspapers. In her thirties, she changed her career to journalism. In 1988, Mika began working for Die Tageszeitung. Ten years later, she became one of the editors-in-chief in 1998 and the following year Mika became the sole editor-in-chief. She left the paper in mid-July 2009. Mika has worked as a professor at the Berlin University of the Arts since 2007 and was joint head of the cultural journalism course until March 2014. Since leaving that position Mika has been editor-in-chief of the Frankfurter Rundschau. Initially she was working with Arnd Festerling but since March 2019 it has been with Thomas Kaspar.

Mika wrote a biography of Alice Schwarzer which was published in 1998. The work created some controversy due to her ambivalent analysis of Schwarzer. Despite her services to the women's movement Mika claimed Schwarzer also showed contempt for women and was somewhat hostile. Mika was a member of the Media Council of the Berlin-Brandenburg Media Institute from 2003 to 2009. She is also on the board of trustees of Journalists Network and from 2018 she's been on the Board of Trustees for the Peace prize, Friedenspreis des Deutschen Buchhandels.

=== Awards ===
- 1994 Emma Journalist Award
- 2012 Luise Büchner Prize for Journalism
- 2017 Hedwig Dohm certificate

== Bibliography ==
- Mika, Bascha (1998). Alice Schwarzer : eine kritische Biographie (in German). Reinbek: Rowohlt. ISBN 3-498-04390-0. OCLC 38906402.
- Mika, Bascha (2011). Die Feigheit der Frauen Rollenfallen und Geiselmentalität. - Eine Streitschrift wider den Selbstbetrug (in German). München. ISBN 978-3-570-10070-7. OCLC 703144500.
- Mika, Bascha (2014). Mutprobe Frauen und das höllische Spiel mit dem Älterwerden (in German). München. ISBN 978-3-570-10170-4. OCLC 869895392.
- Mika, Bascha (2015). Was ist gerecht? Argumente für eine bessere Gesellschaft (in German). Frankfurt, M. ISBN 978-3-95542-154-0. OCLC 907549347.
- Mika, Bascha; Festerling, Arnd; Frankfurter Societäts-Medien GmbH (2016). Freiheit wo unsere Freiheit beginnt und wer sie bedroht (in German). [Frankfurt am Main]. ISBN 978-3-95542-225-7. OCLC 949777944.
- Mika, Bascha; Festerling, Arnd; Frankfurter Societäts-Medien GmbH (2017). Die Mythen der Rechten was sie uns glauben machen wollen - und wie wir uns dagegen wehren können (in German). [Frankfurt am Main]. ISBN 978-3-95542-263-9. OCLC 988182306.
- Mika, Bascha; Erb, Nadja; Frankfurter Societäts-Medien GmbH (2019). Mut für einen Feminismus, der allen gut tut (in German). [Frankfurt am Main]. ISBN 978-3-95542-347-6. OCLC 1098674987.
