= Dziekaństwo =

- Village
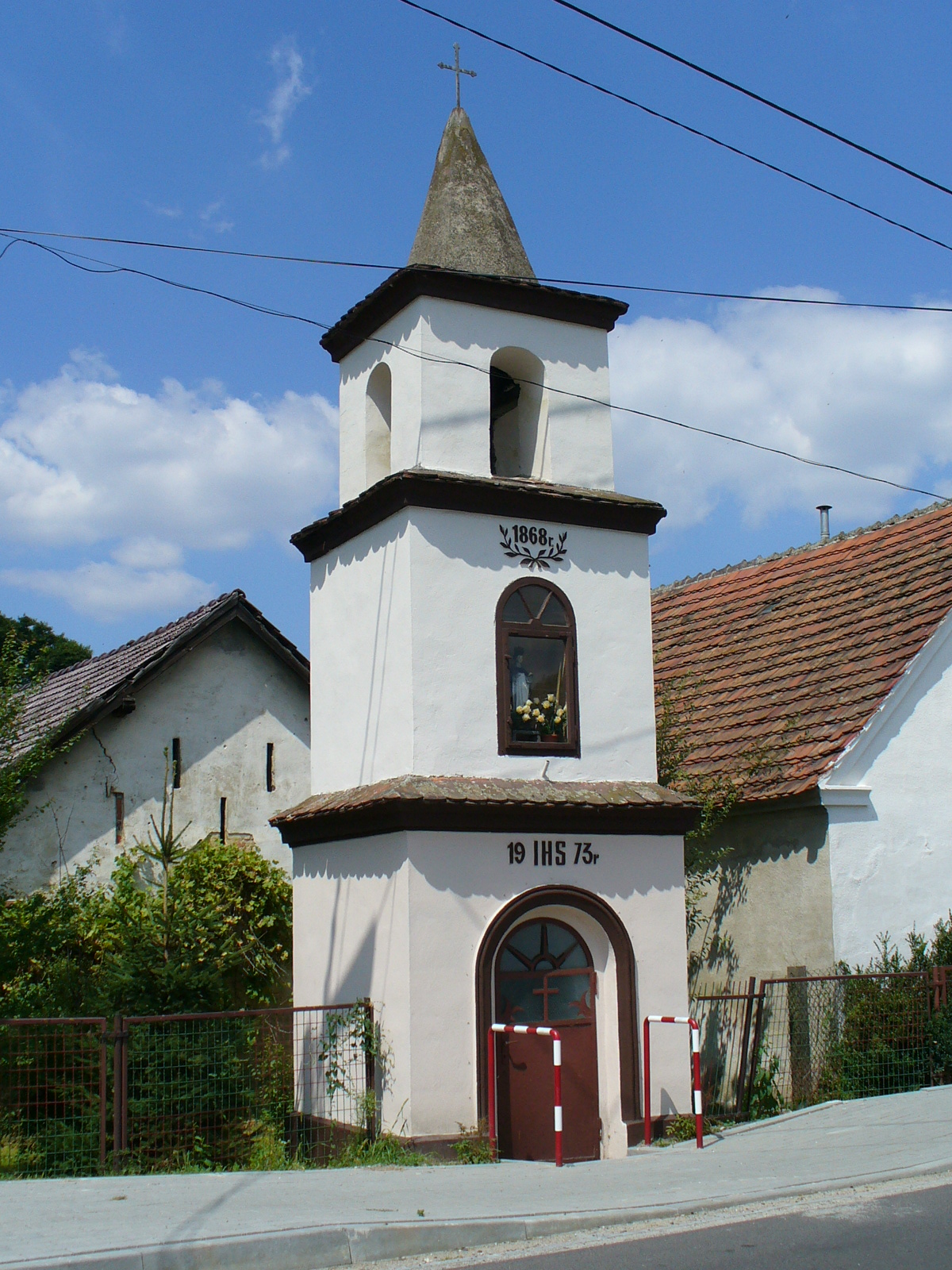
- Chapel

- Location within Poland
- Coordinates: 50°38′15″N 17°51′44″E
- Country: Poland
- Voivodeship: Opole
- County: Opole
- Gmina: Komprachcice
- Time zone: UTC+1 (CET)
  - Summer (DST): UTC+2 (CEST)
- Vehicle registration: OPO

Dziekaństwo [d͡ʑɛˈkaɲstfɔ] (German: Dziekanstwo) is a village in the administrative district of Gmina Komprachcice, within Opole County, Opole Voivodeship, in southern Poland.
