= Nius =

German news website

- Company type: SE & Co. KGaA
- Website type: News website
- Available in: German
- Headquarters: Germany
- Owners: Frank Gotthardt via VIUS SE & Co. KGaA
- Founder: Frank Gotthardt
- Managing director: Julian Reichelt, editor in chief
- Key people: Pauline Voss (formely NZZ), vice editor in chief Ral Schuler (formely Bild), head of political departement
- Website: www.nius.de
- Commercial: Yes
- Registration: Required
- Users: 12.000 registered in 2023
- Launched: July 2023
- Current status: active

Nius (stylized NiUS) is a German right-wing online media outlet launched in July 2023. It publishes news and opinion content via its website, YouTube, and web radio. Its content and style has often been compared to Fox News in the United States.

The outlet was founded by Julian Reichelt, the former editor-in-chief of Bild, after he was dismissed from that publication in 2021 over allegations of abuse of power. It is primarily financed by German entrepreneur Frank Gotthardt, founder of CompuGroup Medical and honorary chairman of the Christian Democratic Union Economic Council in Rhineland-Palatinate.

== History ==
In 2025, CDU politician Daniel Günther said about Nius on a talk show: „When I look at Nius articles that I have anything to do with: There is usually nothing right in them. They are completely devoid of facts.“ Editor-in-chief Reichelt wrote in this context in a commentary by „Censorship and Prohibition Fantasies“. The portal took legal action against Minister-President's Günther. The Higher Administrative Court of Schleswig-Holstein rejected the complaint on the grounds that Günther had made his statements as a party politician and not as Minister-President, and could say so as a politician.

A data leak occurred in the fall of 2026. The published files contain information about employees, readers and the approximately 12,000 subscribers, including email contacts and in many cases real names with residential addresses. Some affected individuals have parts of their credit card number on file.
