= Żerkowice, Opole Voivodeship =

Żerkowice Zirkowitz
- Neighbourhood
- Location within Poland
- Coordinates: 50°39′N 17°51′E
- Country: Poland
- Voivodeship: Opole
- County/City: Opole
- First mentioned: 1274
- Within city limits: 2017
- Time zone: UTC+1 (CET)
  - Summer (DST): UTC+2 (CEST)
- Vehicle registration: OP

Żerkowice [ʐɛrkɔˈvit͡sɛ] (German: Zirkowitz) is a neighbourhood of Opole, Poland, located in the south-western part of the city.

It was included within the city limits of Opole in 2017. Prior it was a village in the administrative district of Gmina Komprachcice, within Opole County, Opole Voivodeship.
