= Osiny, Opole Voivodeship =

Osiny Rothhaus
- Village
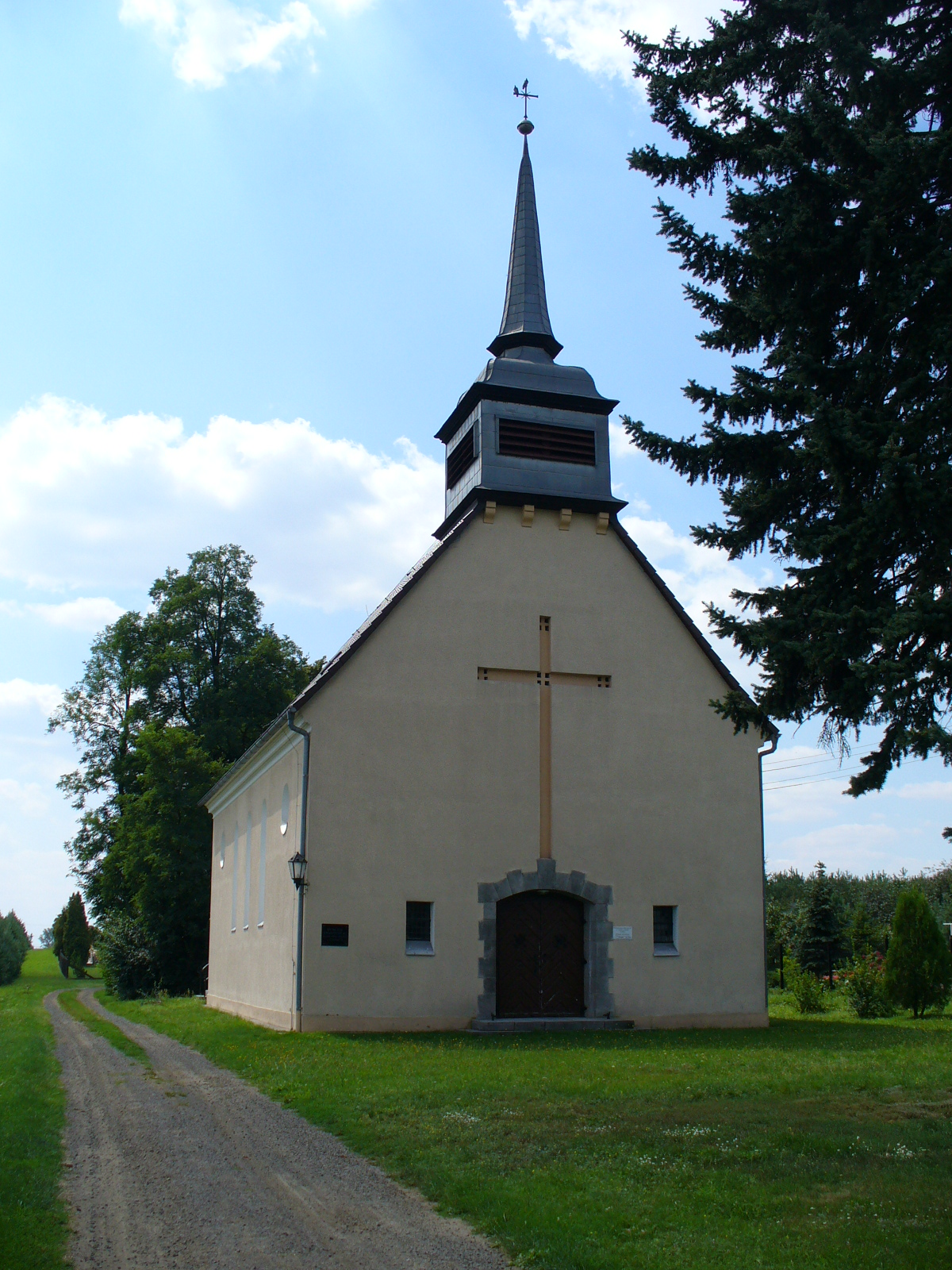
- Church in Osiny

- Location within Poland
- Coordinates: 50°39′N 17°51′E
- Country: Poland
- Voivodeship: Opole
- County: Opole
- Gmina: Komprachcice

Population
  - Total: 419
- Time zone: UTC+1 (CET)
  - Summer (DST): UTC+2 (CEST)
- Vehicle registration: OPO

Osiny [ɔˈɕinɨ] is a village in the administrative district of Gmina Komprachcice, within Opole County, Opole Voivodeship, in southern Poland.
