= Chmielowice, Opole Voivodeship =

Chmielowice Chmiellowitz
- Neighbourhood
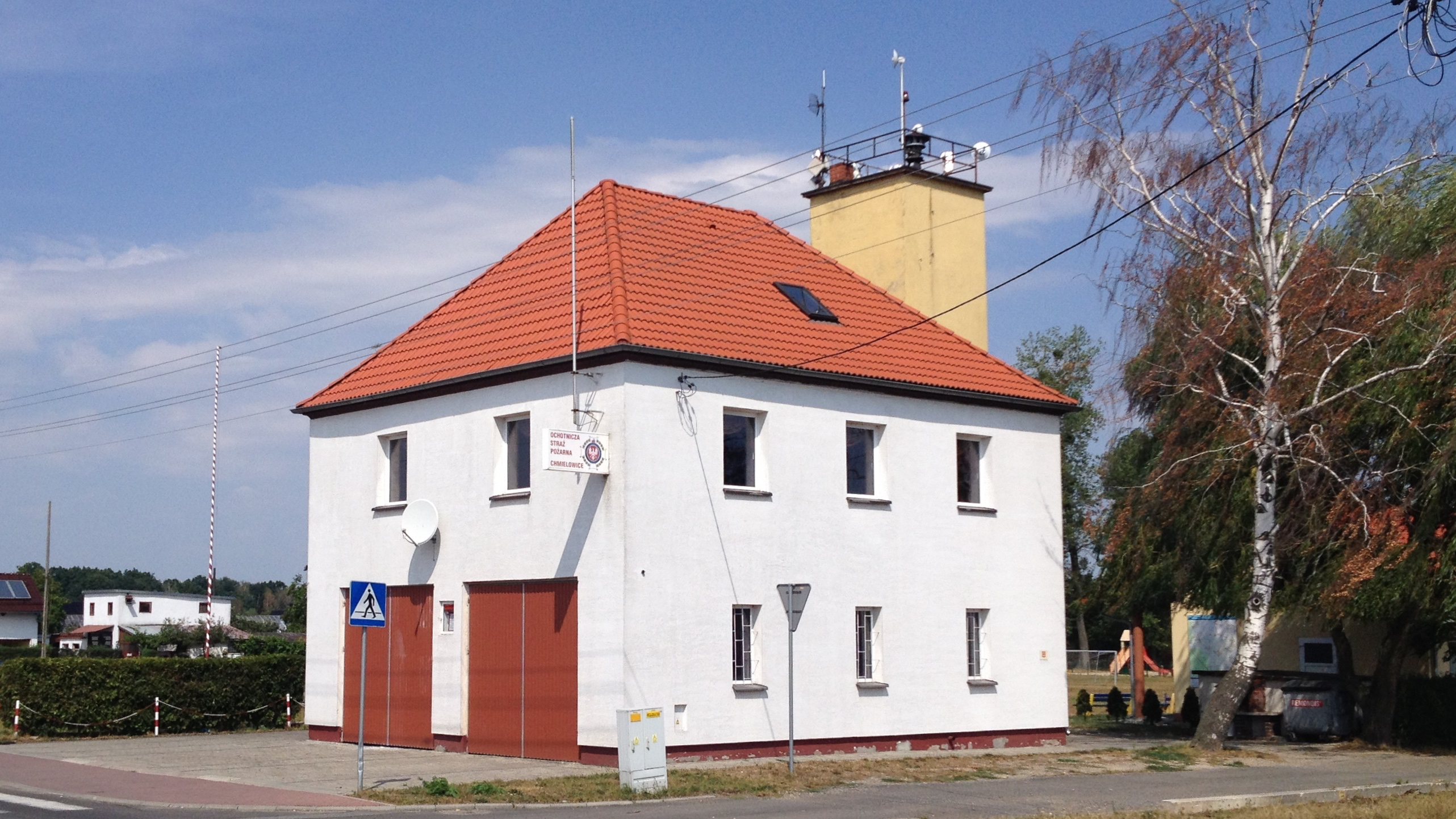
- Fire station

- Location within Poland
- Coordinates: 50°38′54″N 17°51′55″E
- Country: Poland
- Voivodeship: Opole
- County/City: Opole
- Within city limits: 2017
- Population (approx.): 1,500
- Time zone: UTC+1 (CET)
  - Summer (DST): UTC+2 (CEST)
- Vehicle registration: OP

Chmielowice [xmjɛlɔˈvit͡sɛ] is a neighbourhood of Opole, Poland, located in the south-western part of the city.

Before 2017 it was a village in the administrative district of Gmina Komprachcice, within Opole County, Opole Voivodeship.
