= Gmina Komprachcice =

Gmina Komprachcice Gemeinde Comprachtschütz Komprachcice Commune
- Gmina
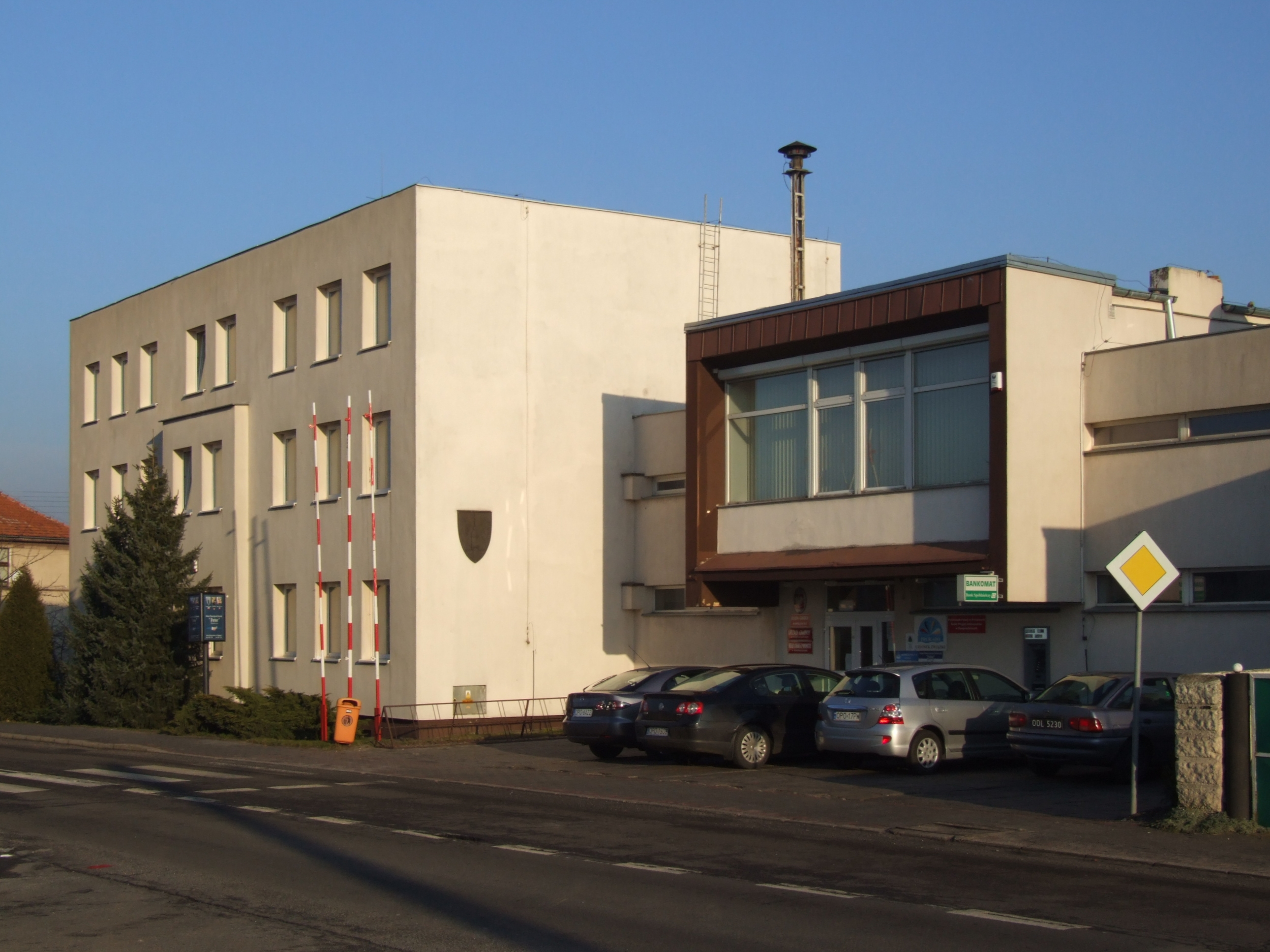
- Main office of the commune

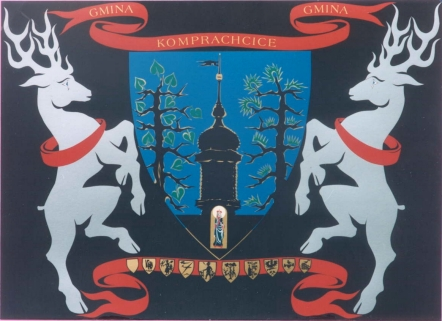
- Flag Coat of arms
- Interactive map of Gmina Komprachcice
- Coordinates (Komprachcice): 50°38′N 17°49′E
- Country: Poland
- Voivodeship: Opole
- County: Opole
- Seat: Komprachcice

Area
  - Total: 55.87 km^{2} (21.57 sq mi)

Population (2019-06-30)
  - Total: 9,108
  - Density: 163.0/km^{2} (422.2/sq mi)
- Website: http://www.komprachcice.pl

Gmina Komprachcice (German: Gemeinde Comprachtschütz) is a rural gmina (administrative district) in Opole County, Opole Voivodeship, in south-western Poland. Its seat is the village of Komprachcice, which lies approximately 10 kilometres (6 mi) south-west of the regional capital Opole.

The gmina covers an area of 55.87 square kilometres (21.6 sq mi). As of 2019, its total population was 9,108. Since 2009, the commune, like much of the surrounding region, has been bilingual in Polish and German, and a substantial German minority remained after the War.

== Administrative divisions ==
The commune contains the villages and settlements of:

- Komprachcice
- Chmielowice
- Domecko
- Dziekaństwo
- Ochodze
- Osiny
- Polska Nowa Wieś
- Pucnik
- Wawelno
- Żerkowice

== Neighbouring gminas ==
Gmina Komprachcice is bordered by the city of Opole and by the gminas of Dąbrowa, Prószków and Tułowice.

== Twin towns – sister cities ==
Gmina Komprachcice is twinned with:

- Hasbergen, Germany
- Město Albrechtice, Czech Republic
