= Komprachcice =

Komprachcice Comprachtschütz
- Village
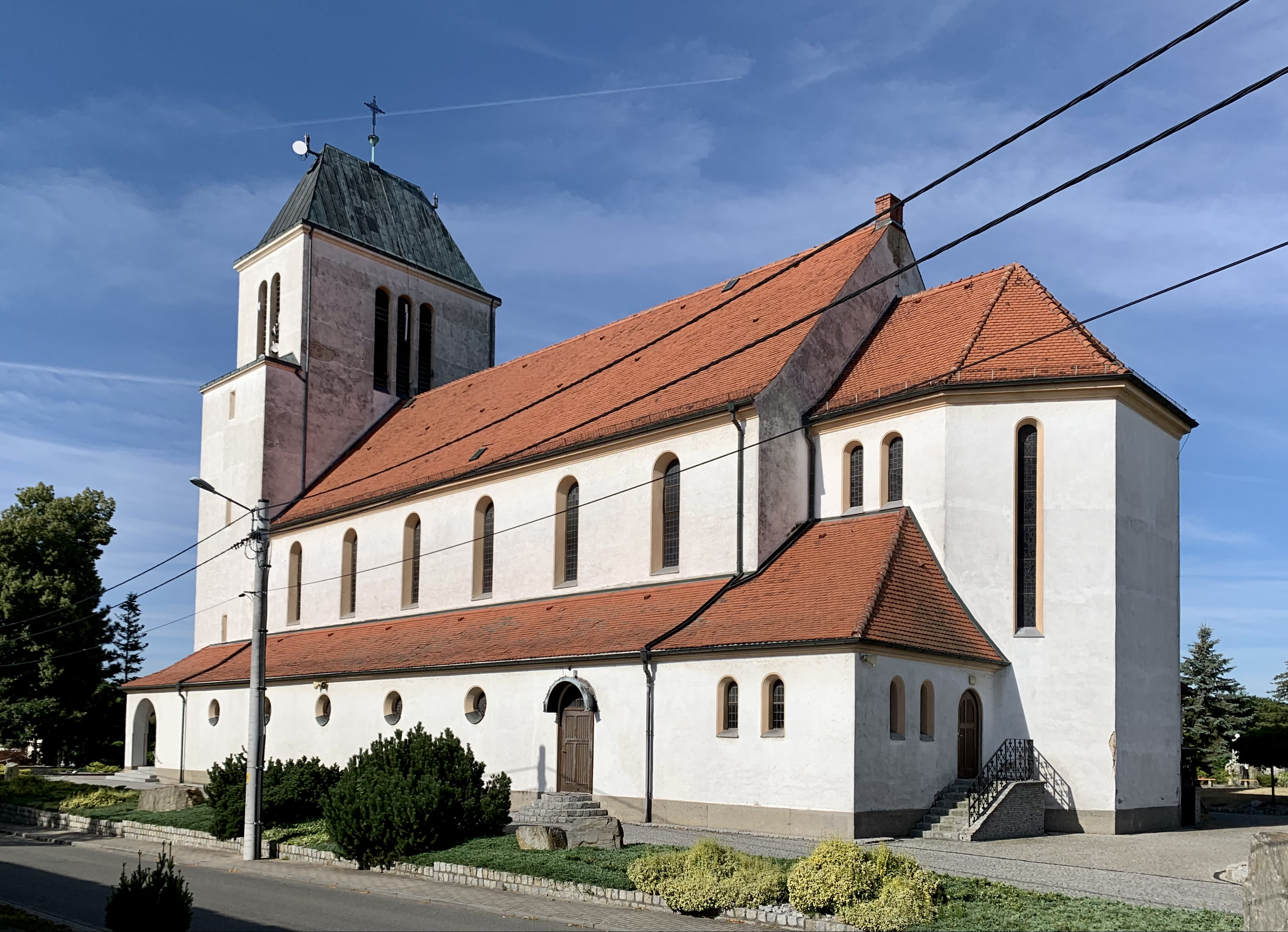
- Church of Saint Francis

- Location within Poland
- Coordinates: 50°38′9″N 17°49′24″E
- Country: Poland
- Voivodeship: Opole
- County: Opole
- Gmina: Komprachcice

Population
  - Total: 2,900
- Time zone: UTC+1 (CET)
  - Summer (DST): UTC+2 (CEST)
- Vehicle registration: OPO

Komprachcice [kɔmpraxˈt͡ɕit͡sɛ] (German: Comprachtschütz) is a village in Opole County, Opole Voivodeship, in southern Poland. It is the seat of the gmina (administrative district) called Gmina Komprachcice.

11 Polish citizens were murdered by Nazi Germany in the village during World War II. There is a mass grave of the victims at the local cemetery.

== Library ==
Municipal Public Library in Komprachcice; a library next to the pre-school. The entrance to the library is situated on Szkolna Street.

== Notable people ==
- Bascha Mika (born 1954), German journalist and publicist who was born in the village
