= Mathias Döpfner =

German businessman and journalist (born 1963)

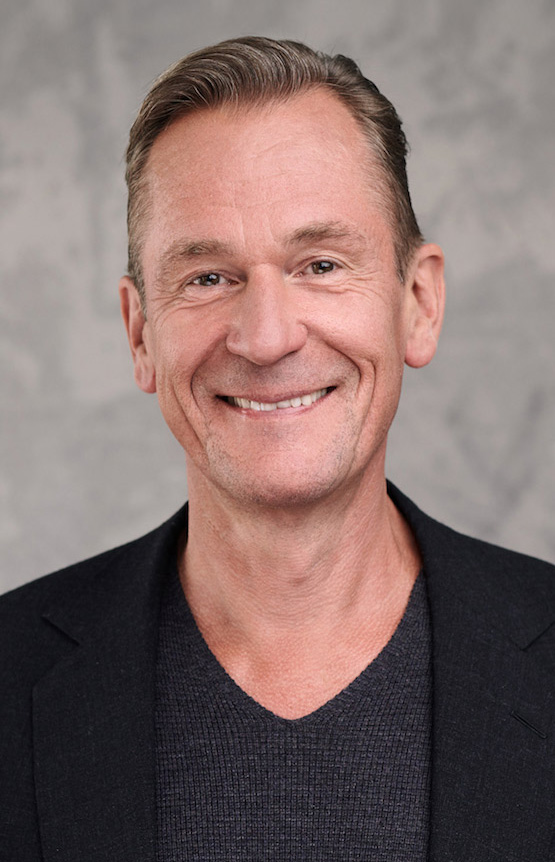
- Döpfner in 2023
- Born: 15 January 1963 (age 63); Bonn, West Germany
- Education: University of Frankfurt (PhD)
- Occupations: Businessman, Author, Journalist
- Title: CEO, Axel Springer SE
- Board member of: Netflix, Inc.; Warner Music; Insider Inc

Mathias Döpfner (born 15 January 1963) is a German businessman, author, art collector, and journalist. He is the CEO of media group Axel Springer SE and, together with Friede Springer, holds 95% of the share in the company. From 2016 to 2022 he was president of the Federal Association of Digital Publishers and Newspaper Publishers (BDZV).

After working as editor-in-chief for several newspapers, he joined the management board of Axel Springer SE in 2000. Friede Springer, head of the media group and widow of founder Axel Springer, designated Döpfner as her successor in 2020 and gave voting rights and shares valued at over 1 billion Euros to him in 2021.

== Early life and education ==
Döpfner was born on 15 January 1963 in Bonn. He grew up in Offenbach am Main. His mother was a housewife and his father, Dieter C. Döpfner, was a university professor of architecture and director of the Offenbach College of Applied Arts from 1966 to 1970.

Döpfner studied musicology, German literature and theater science in Frankfurt and Boston. He obtained a Ph.D. in musicology in 1990 from the University of Frankfurt. A committee of the university found in 2023 that he had engaged in scientific misconduct by using a number of blind quotations and unchecked literature references. The committee found a significantly lower plagiarism count than the original complaint alleged. Because of this, the findings were not sufficient to revoke his doctoral degree.

== Career ==
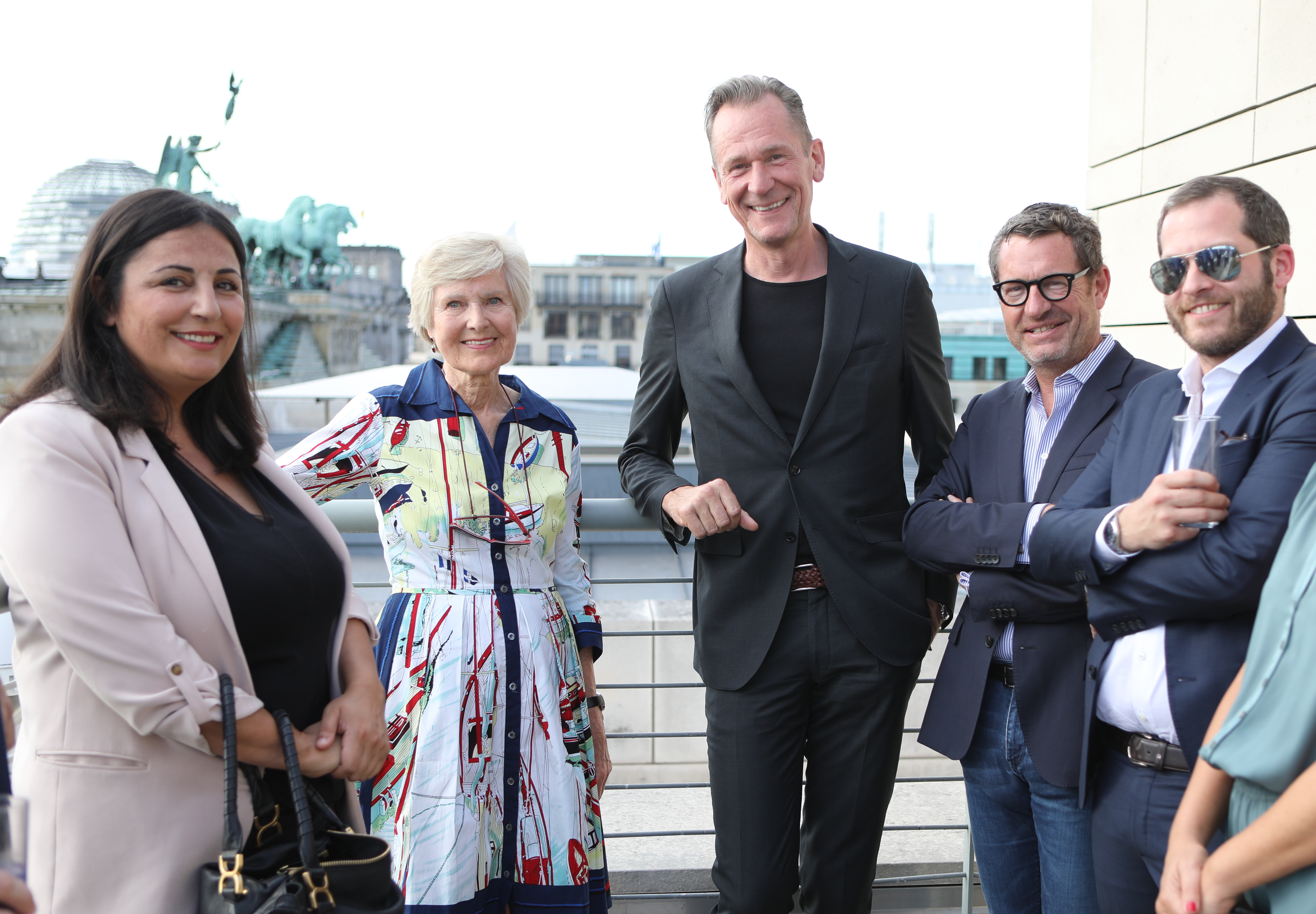
(l. to r.) Düzen Tekkal, Friede Springer, Mathias Döpfner, Kai Diekmann, and Julian Reichelt on the roof of the US Embassy in Berlin (2019)

Döpfner began his career in 1982 as the music critic of the Frankfurter Allgemeine Zeitung (FAZ) supplement. In 1992, after working as the FAZ correspondent in Brussels, Döpfner moved to Gruner + Jahr – initially working under board member Axel Ganz in Paris, then as an assistant to CEO Gerd Schulte-Hillen.

In April 1994, Döpfner became editor-in-chief of the Berlin weekly newspaper Wochenpost, and in 1996, he assumed the role of editor-in-chief of the Hamburg tabloid Hamburger Morgenpost.

In March 1998, Döpfner became editor-in-chief of Axel Springer SE's national daily newspaper Die Welt. He was a member of the management board and head of the newspaper division of Axel Springer SE in 2000, and rose to CEO in 2002.

As CEO, Döpfner initiated a two-stage digital transformation strategy, beginning in 2006, focusing on organic growth and digital acquisitions to transition the company towards digitization. By 2013, under his leadership, the company had total revenues of $3.9 billion, and earnings before interest, taxes, depreciation and amortization (EBITDA) of $625 million.

In 2020, Friede Springer appointed Mathias Döpfner as her successor through a combination of gifting, selling, and transferring voting rights associated with her shares in the company. As part of this transition, Springer sold a 4.1% share directly to Döpfner and gifted him an additional 15%, thereby increasing his direct ownership to 22%. Furthermore, Springer transferred to Döpfner the voting rights for her remaining 22% stake in the company.

In February 2023, The Economist reported on Döpfner's plans to expand the Springer group's media presence in the United States.

As of April 2025, Döpfner, together with Friede Springer, holds 95% of the shares of Axel Springer.

== Politics and activism ==
Döpfner is also known for his activism and outspoken views on media, socio-political, economic, and cultural issues. He has been involved in public debates with figures such as Nobel laureate Günter Grass. These discussions have covered a range of topics, from the challenges posed by Islamic fundamentalism to perceptions of the United States in Germany, and evaluations of the 1968 movement's legacy.

In an essay for WELT, titled The West and the mocking laughter of Islamism, Döpfner articulated his concerns about Islamism's threats.

Döpfner considers himself a "non-Jewish Zionist."

In 2010, as a visiting professor at the University of Cambridge, Döpfner delivered a series of lectures entitled "Freedom and the Digital Revolution." These talks explored the complex relationship Germans have with the concept of freedom, the worldwide decline of freedom, and how the digital era represents a significant cultural shift impacting press freedom, privacy, and journalism. In the letter, he highlighted Google's substantial share in internet searches and advocated for transparency in search result algorithms based on qualitative criteria.

In 2014, Döpfner wrote an open letter to the executive chairman of Google, Eric Schmidt, where he voiced apprehensions about Google evolving into a "superstate" beyond regulatory reach.

Döpfner's contributions to discussions on media policy speeches at events such as the NOAH Conference Berlin 2015 and the SPIEGEL Publishers Forum, focusing on the monetization of online content and the distinction between private and public media in the digital space.

Döpfner publicly supported German satirist Jan Böhmermann in 2016 following controversy over Böhmermann's satirical poem about Turkish President Erdoğan, which led to legal challenges. Erdogan subsequently applied for an injunction against Döpfner in May 2016 at a German Court. The request was rejected in the first and second instance.

Döpfner condemned Kuwait Airlines in 2017 for barring an Israeli passenger from a flight.

In 2019, Döpfner sat down with Facebook founder Mark Zuckerberg to discuss the importance of quality journalism in fostering an informed society, the guiding principles that Facebook uses to prioritize reputable news, and implications of internet regulation and the future of social networking.

In 2021, Döpfner sat down with former US Secretary of State Henry Kissinger shortly before the latter's death to discuss the COVID pandemic’s impacts on global politics, China’s prominence as a world power, and implications for the future of the European Union.

Döpfner praised US Vice President JD Vance's Munich Security Conference speech, where he called for an end to the political isolation of the European far right. Döpfner called the response by European leaders "whiny."

=== Israel ===
Döpfner has been described as a "close associate of Netanyahu." At a ceremony in 2025 where he was awarded the Medal of Honour by Israeli president Isaac Herzog, he was described as "one of the most prominent and courageous voices in Europe in the longstanding fight against antisemitism and a staunch supporter of the state of Israel."

In July 2025, Israeli newspaper Haaretz wrote that Döpfner's name had been linked to the BibiLeaks scandal, where the alleged leak of a classified document from Netanyahu's office to Bild, a newspaper led by Döpfner.

In October 2025, Döpfner was awarded the Israeli Presidential Medal of Honor along with Israeli-American GOP megadonor Miriam Adelson by Israeli President Isaac Herzog.

In October 2025, Döpfner wrote an op-ed in Politico accusing European aid to Palestine as having funded terrorism, and writing that by restricting aid to Israel, Europe was on the "wrong side of history". In March 2026, he subsequently wrote a Politico op-ed expressing support for Israel and the United States in the 2026 Iran War.

In April 2026, Politico employees in the United States and Europe wrote a letter to editor-in-chief Jonathan Greenberger, writing that Döpfner's "repeated use of POLITICO to promote his political agenda" risked “taking on the appearance of editorial slant." In a subsequent call held with Politico staff, Döpfner said that "nobody should work for Axel Springer despite the essentials or in disagreement with one of the essentials." Döpfner had previously described support for Israel's right to exist as an "essential". During the World Jewish Congress in May 2026, Döpfner declared himself as a "goy" (non-Jew) and a Zionist as well as stated in his speech that the free world must confront antisemitism, anti-Zionism, and online radicalization before they undermine Western democracy itself.

== Journalistic and publishing activities ==
Döpfner regularly speaks out on media and socio-political, economic and cultural issues. Particular attention was given to his debate with Nobel laureate Günter Grass, documented by Der Spiegel (June 2006). Döpfner surprised with the confession: "I am a non-Jewish Zionist". Alongside the topics of threats from Islamic fundamentalism and the image of the United States in Germany, the discussion also focused on the achievements and the failings of the 1968 movement. Döpfner published his opinion on the threat from Islamism in his WELT essay "The West and the mocking laughter of Islamism".

In July 2009, ARD TV broadcast Döpfner's film "My friend George Weidenfeld". Döpfner sees the film portrait, in which he accompanies Lord Weidenfeld on his travels and at meetings and interviews prominent companions such as Daniel Barenboim, Helmut Kohl, Angela Merkel or Shimon Peres, as "a very subjective approach to a great European".

He has repeatedly commented on the subjects of freedom and digitization, particularly in the fall of 2010 as a visiting professor at the University of Cambridge. Under the title "Freedom and the Digital Revolution" Döpfner held three lectures, which addressed Germans' difficult relationship to freedom, the global erosion of freedom and its causes, and digitization as the fourth major cultural revolution and its impact on the freedom of press, privacy, and journalism as well as in his book "Die Freiheitsfalle – The freedom trap" published by Propyläen Verlag in 2011, in which he focuses on the West's growing tiredness of defending freedom. Taking three watershed events as examples – the fall of the Berlin Wall, Nine Eleven and the financial crisis – Döpfner analyzes the triumphs, threats, and excesses of liberal societies and argues that freedom needs to be fought for, defended and answered for daily, and that democratic societies have not been sufficiently resolute in this regard. They risked falling into the freedom trap and either losing freedom through inaction or betraying it by defending with the wrong means. Alongside the power of freedom in politics and business, Döpfner reflects upon the spirit of freedom in music, literature and painting on the basis of three central works by Richard Wagner, Thomas Mann and Gustave Courbet. The book closes with an analysis of the digital world, in which Döpfner emphasizes the ambivalence of the Internet as a platform critical of authority at the same time as being a monitoring tool controlled by authority.

Döpfner's contributions to media policy include keynotes, for example at the NOAH Conference Berlin 2015 or at the SPIEGEL Publishers Forum, the focus of which were the establishment of paid online content and the differentiation between private and public media in digital channels.

For the occasion of the centenary of Axel Springer's birth in 2012, Döpfner gave his personal view of the founder in his New Year's speech. The "Ceremony" in May 2012 was a surprise in itself, as Döpfner converted the entire event into a tongue-in-cheek and entertaining revue without a single speech. He made his own debut as an actor, reciting a fictitious letter to the publisher wearing a hoodie jacket and jeans. The F.A.Z described the revue as an event, in which "pathos, flippancy, understatement and exaggeration, self-righteousness and self-irony were mixed together in a wondrous, sometimes uplifting way, a milestone in the history of the Springer Group."

In an open letter to the executive chairman of Google, Eric Schmidt, he criticized the search engine company, thus triggering a public debate.

In April 2016, Döpfner showed solidarity with German satirist Jan Böhmermann in an open letter. In his show "Neo Magazine Royale", Böhmermann had previously illustrated the difference between satire and insulting criticism with profane a poem about the Turkish President Erdoğan, which led to resentment in the Turkish government as well as a public prosecution in Germany. Erdogan subsequently applied for an injunction against Döpfner in May 2016 at a German Court. The request was rejected in the first and second instance.

In November 2017, Döpfner condemned Kuwait Airlines for barring an Israeli passenger from a flight.

In February 2023, The Economist reported on Döpfner's plans to expand the Springer group's media presence in the United States.

In September 2023, Döpfner published The Trade Trap: How To Stop Doing Business With Dictators, which shares his perspective on reconstructing global trade, strengthening democracy and protecting individual freedoms. In the book, he analyzes Western dependency on China and Russia and suggests an approach to free trade based on establishing a values-based alliance of democracies. Döpfner shares his encounters with individuals such as Vladimir Putin, Recep Tayyip Erdogan, George W. Bush, Angela Merkel, and Jack Ma.

== Text message and email leaks ==
During the compliance procedure involving Julian Reichelt, Döpfner sent a text message to a writer in March 2021, characterizing the Federal Republic of Germany as a "new, authoritarian GDR-State". This message, exposed by New York Times journalist Ben Smith, was interpreted as endorsing a right-wing conspiracy theory on COVID-19 restrictions. This incident led to discussions comparing the public perception of Axel Springer SE in the United States to that of Fox News in terms of political alignment. Döpfner criticized The New York Times for publishing his private text, arguing it was taken out of context and not meant for public discourse.

In September 2022, the Washington Post disclosed an email from Döpfner to executive colleagues before the 2020 US presidential election, praising specific policies of President Donald Trump and expressing a desire for Trump's re-election. Döpfner described this email as an "ironic gesture" aimed at those critical of Trump, highlighting his concern about journalism's increasing polarization. Die Zeit also reported that Döpfner praised Donald Trump after the January 2020 killing of the Iranian general Qassem Suleimani, stating: “My suggestion. Nobel peace prize for Trump, and take it away from ibama [sic, referring to Barack Obama, winner of the prize in 2009].”

Die Zeit reported in April 2023 on leaked personal communications from Döpfner, revealing his views on various issues, including climate change, Zionism, COVID-19 measures, and political figures and movements within Germany. Some examples of his more contentious remarks were: “Free west, fuck the intolerant Muslims and all the other riff-raff.” “The ossis [east Germans] are either communists or fascists. They don’t do in-between. Disgusting.” "I am all for climate change, we shouldn’t fight climate change but adjust to it."

The Guardian also noted that "in a message from October 2019, the top executive ponders writing an article on the 30th anniversary of the fall of the Berlin Wall in which he calls for rescinding reunification and turning the former GDR into an “agrarian and production zone with uniform wage payments”. “My mother always said it. The ossis are never going to be democrats.”

Some of the leaked messages called into question Döpfner's professed commitment to non-partisan journalism. He had recently purchased the American publication Politico, claiming he sought to bring such unbiased coverage to the overly polarized US media space.

As reported by The Guardian:

The leaked messages also raise specific questions about close links between the Springer publishing empire – whose flagship titles includes Bild, Die Welt, Business Insider and Politico – and the pro-business Free Democratic party (FDP), a junior partner in Olaf Scholz’s three-party coalition government.

Citing a dinner with the FDP leader, Christian Lindner, Döpfner repeatedly urged Julian Reichelt as Bild editor to “do more for the FDP” in the run-up to the September 2021 federal elections. “Please strengthen the FDP,” he wrote two days before the vote. “If they do well they can act with such authority in the traffic light [coalition of Social Democrats, Green party and FDP] that it collapses.”

Such a collapse, the message intimates, would bring about his preferred outcome of a conservative-led so-called “Jamaica” coalition between Christian Democrats, Greens and FDP.

Following the leaks, Döpfner publicly expressed regret for any offense his remarks may have caused, acknowledging the impact of his words on others.

== Other activities ==
In 2010, Döpfner was visiting professor in media at the University of Cambridge and became a member of St John's College. He is also a member of The Business Council.

Döpfner holds a variety of paid and unpaid positions:

=== Corporate boards ===
- eMarketer, Member of the Board of Directors (since 2016)
- Insider Inc., Member of the Board of Directors
- Netflix, Inc., Member of the Board of Directors (since 2018)
- Ringier Axel Springer Schweiz, Member of the Board of Directors (since 2016)
- Warner Music, Member of the Board of Directors (since 2014)

=== Non-profit organizations ===
- American Academy in Berlin, Member of the Board of Trustees
- Alfred Herrhausen Gesellschaft of Deutsche Bank, Member of the Board of Trustees
- Axel Springer Prize, Chairman of the Board of Trustees
- Friends of the Academy of the Arts, Member
- Bilderberg Meetings, Member of Steering Committee
- European Publishers Council, Member
- Federation of German Newspaper Publishers (BDZV), President (since 2016)
- Frank Schirrmacher Foundation, Member of the Board
- Blavatnik School of Government, University of Oxford, Member of the International Advisory Board (since 2010)
- International Journalists’ Programmes (IJP), Member of the Board of Trustees
- Museum Berggruen, Member of the International Council
- Friends of the Prussian Palaces and Gardens Foundation Berlin-Brandenburg, Member
- Robert Koch Foundation, Member of the Board of Trustees

== Personal life ==
Döpfner is married to Ulrike Weiss, who is the daughter of Ulrich Weiss, a former executive of Deutsche Bank AG. The couple has three sons, with one of them serving as chief of staff to entrepreneur Peter Thiel. In 2016, Döpfner also had a child with billionaire art collector Julia Stoschek.

In addition to his professional endeavors, Döpfner is an art collector, particularly known for his comprehensive collection of female nude paintings spanning over 500 years. Furthermore, he is a co-owner of Villa Schoningen, in Potsdam, where he organized the exhibition “Andy Warhol—Early Works” in collaboration with the Stiftung für Kunst und Kultur e.V. Bonn.

== Recognition ==
- 2023 Order of Merit of the Italian Republic
- 2019 Leo Baeck Prize of the Central Council of Jews in Germany
- 2019 Janusz Korczak Prize for Humanism
- 2016 Arno Lustiger Prize
- 2015 McCloy Award of the American Council on Germany
- 2014 Anti-Defamation League (ADL) International Leadership Award, New York City
- 2014 Shepard Stone-Award, Aspen Berlin
- 2014 Europe Award of Merit des U.O.B.B.
- 2013 European Manager of the Year, European Business Press Association
- 2012 Kress Head of the Year
- 2012 Strategist of the Year, Financial Times Germany
- 2011 German Media Award: Media Person of the Year
- 2010 Humanitas Visiting Professor in Media 2010 at the University of Cambridge; Member of St. John's College, Cambridge
- 2008 Leadership Award, Global American Institute for Contemporary German Studies New York
- 2008 Jerusalem Prize of the Zionist Organization in Germany
- 2007 Leo Baeck Medal of the Leo Baeck Institute New York
- 2007 1st place in Kress report in the category: "Top 50 media heads – the most important managers from media and communication"
- 2007 Honorary Order of Merit of Berlin
- 2000 Appointed Young Global Leader of the World Economic Forum
- 1991 Axel-Springer-Preis for Young Journalists

== Works ==
- Mathias Dopfner, The Trade Trap: How To Stop Doing Business With Dictators, New York: Simon & Schuster, 2023, ISBN 978-1-6680-1625-1
- Mathias O. C. Döpfner, Thomas Garms: Neue Deutsche Welle. Kunst oder Mode? Frankfurt am Main; Berlin; Wien: Ullstein, 1984, ISBN 3-548-36505-1 (Ullstein-Buch, 36505; Populäre Kultur)
- Mathias O. C. Döpfner, Thomas Garms: Erotik in der Musik. Frankfurt/Main; Berlin: Ullstein, 1986, ISBN 3-548-36517-5 (Ullstein-Buch, 36517; Populäre Kultur)
- Mathias O. C. Döpfner: Musikkritik in Deutschland nach 1945. Inhaltliche und formale Tendenzen; eine kritische Analyse. At the same time: Dissertation, Universität Frankfurt (Main), 1990. Frankfurt am Main; Bern; New York; Paris: Lang, 1991, ISBN 3-631-43158-9 (Europäische Hochschulschriften, Reihe 36, Musikwissenschaft vol. 59)
- Brüssel. Das Insider-Lexikon. München: Beck, 1993, ISBN 3-406-37397-6 (Beck'sche Reihe; 1007)
- Axel Springer. Neue Blicke auf den Verleger; eine Edition aktueller Autorenbeiträge und eigener Texte. Editor: Mathias Döpfner. Hamburg: Springer, 2005, ISBN 3-9809879-9-X
- Reform statt Subvention – Warum wir verlässliche gesetzliche Maßstäbe für Fusionsvorhaben und Schutz kreativer Leistungen brauchen, in: Krautscheid/Schwartmann (editors), Fesseln für die Vielfalt? Das Medienkonzentrationsrecht auf dem Prüfstand, C.F Müller Verlag, Heidelberg 2010
- Die Verlage sind im digitalen Zeitalter stärker, als sie selbst denken. In: Hubert Burda, Mathias Döpfner, Bodo Hombach, Jürgen Rüttgers (editors): 2020 – Gedanken zur Zukunft des Internets. Klartext, Essen, 2010, S. 177–182. ISBN 978-3-8375-0376-0.
- How German is it? print of the speech at Thomas Demand's exhibition „Nationalgalerie“, Suhrkamp 2010
- Die Freiheitsfalle – Ein Bericht. Berlin: Propyläen, 2011, 256 pages, ISBN 978-3-5490-7372-8
- Anselm Kiefer/Mathias Döpfner, Kunst und Leben, Mythen und Tod. Ein Streitgespräch, Quadriga Verlag, 2012
- Leser- und Kundenorientierung in einer digitalisierten Medienwelt – Eine Zwischenbilanz, in: Stadler/Brenner/Hermann (editors), Erfolg im digitalen Zeitalter, Frankfurter Allgemeine Buch Verlag, 2012
- Essay „Laughter is anti-authoritarian, laughter is freedom“, 12 January 2015
- Die Welt gehört denen, die neu denken. In: Kardinaltugenden effektiver Führung. Drucker, Peter F. (editor), München: Redline Verlag, 2014. ISBN 978-3-86881-396-8
- „Berlin ist das Herz Europas, ich kenne kein anderes.“: Axel Springer und seine Stadt. Berlin: Edition Braus. ISBN 978-3-86228-135-0.
- Abschied vom Pessimismus. In: Die Idee des Mediums – Reden zur Zukunft des Journalismus / Bernhard Pörksen; Andreas Narr (editor), von Halem 2015. ISBN 978-3-86962-146-3
