= Domecko =

- Village
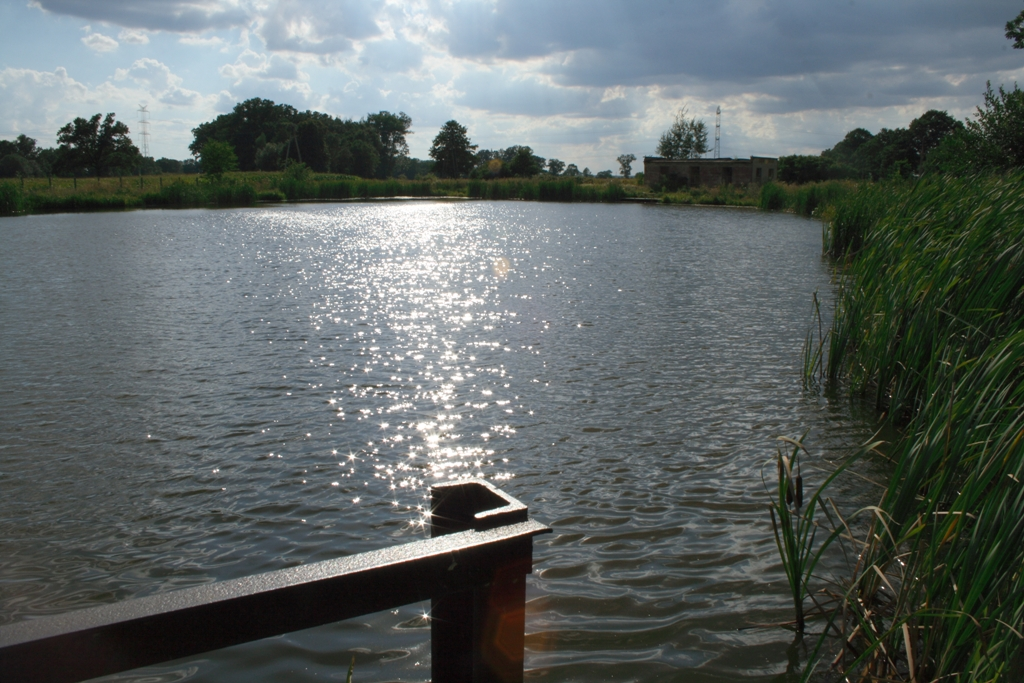
- Pond in Domecko

- Location within Poland
- Coordinates: 50°37′04″N 17°51′46″E
- Country: Poland
- Voivodeship: Opole
- County: Opole
- Gmina: Komprachcice
- Population: 1,400
- Time zone: UTC+1 (CET)
  - Summer (DST): UTC+2 (CEST)
- Vehicle registration: OPO

Domecko [dɔˈmɛt͡skɔ] is a village in the administrative district of Gmina Komprachcice, within Opole County, Opole Voivodeship, in south-western Poland.

== History ==
The village was first mentioned in the Liber fundationis episcopatus Vratislaviensis from ca. 1295–1305 under the Latinized Polish name Domeczco. Its name is of Polish origin.

Under Nazi Germany, the village was renamed to Althaus to erase traces of Polish origin. During the Second World War, the Germans operated the E74 forced labour subcamp of the Stalag VIII-B/344 prisoner-of-war camp for British and Commonwealth POWs in the village. In January 1945, as the Soviet armies resumed their offensive and advanced into Germany, the prisoners were marched westward in the so-called Long March or Death March. Many of them died from the bitter cold and exhaustion. The lucky ones got far enough to the west to be liberated by the Allied armies after some four months of travelling on foot in appalling conditions. After Germany's defeat in the war, the village became again part of Poland and its historic Polish name Domecko was restored.
