= Die Tageszeitung =

German daily newspaper

- The 30 October 2018 front page of Die Tageszeitung
- Type: Daily newspaper
- Format: Berliner
- Publisher: taz, die tageszeitung Verlagsgenossenschaft eG
- Editor: Barbara Junge, Ulrike Winkelmann, Katrin Gottschalk
- Founded: 1978; 48 years ago
- Political alignment: New Left, green politics, new social movements, anti-capitalism, feminism, left-wing
- Language: German
- Headquarters: Berlin
- ISSN: 0931-9085
- Website: taz.de

Die Tageszeitung (German: [diː ˈtaːɡəsˌtsaɪtʊŋ], lit. 'The Daily Newspaper'), stylized in all lowercase and commonly referred to as taz, is a German daily newspaper. It is organized as a cooperative governed through employee self-management and supported by subscriber-shareholders to maintain editorial independence without relying on a digital paywall.

The editorial board is led since 2020 by a female triumvirate of editors-in-chief: Barbara Junge, Ulrike Winkelmann, and Katrin Gottschalk (since 2025), with Peter Unfried serving as chief reporter.

Founded in 1978 in Berlin as part of an independent, progressive and politically left-leaning movement, it has focused on current affairs, social inequality, ecology, and topics often overlooked by more traditional and conservative newspapers. It mostly supports the alternative green political sphere and Alliance 90/The Greens, but Die Tageszeitung has also been critical of the SPD/Greens coalition government (1998–2005). Originally described as "alternative-left" and critical of the established political system (systemkritisch), it adopted a more moderate and liberal editorial tone by changing editors-in-chief Ines Pohl and Andreas Rüttenauer in 2010.

The newspaper's logo, a paw print, derives from the similarity of the name taz to the German word for paw, Tatze. It ranks among Germany's top eight periodical publications. In 2021 taz overtook the conservative Die Welt for the first time as the fifth most-read daily newspaper in Germany.

On 17 October 2025, Die Tageszeitung published its final weekday printed issue, becoming the first nationwide daily newspaper in Germany to transition its weekday coverage entirely to a digital format, while continuing to publish its Saturday edition (wochentaz) in print.

== History ==
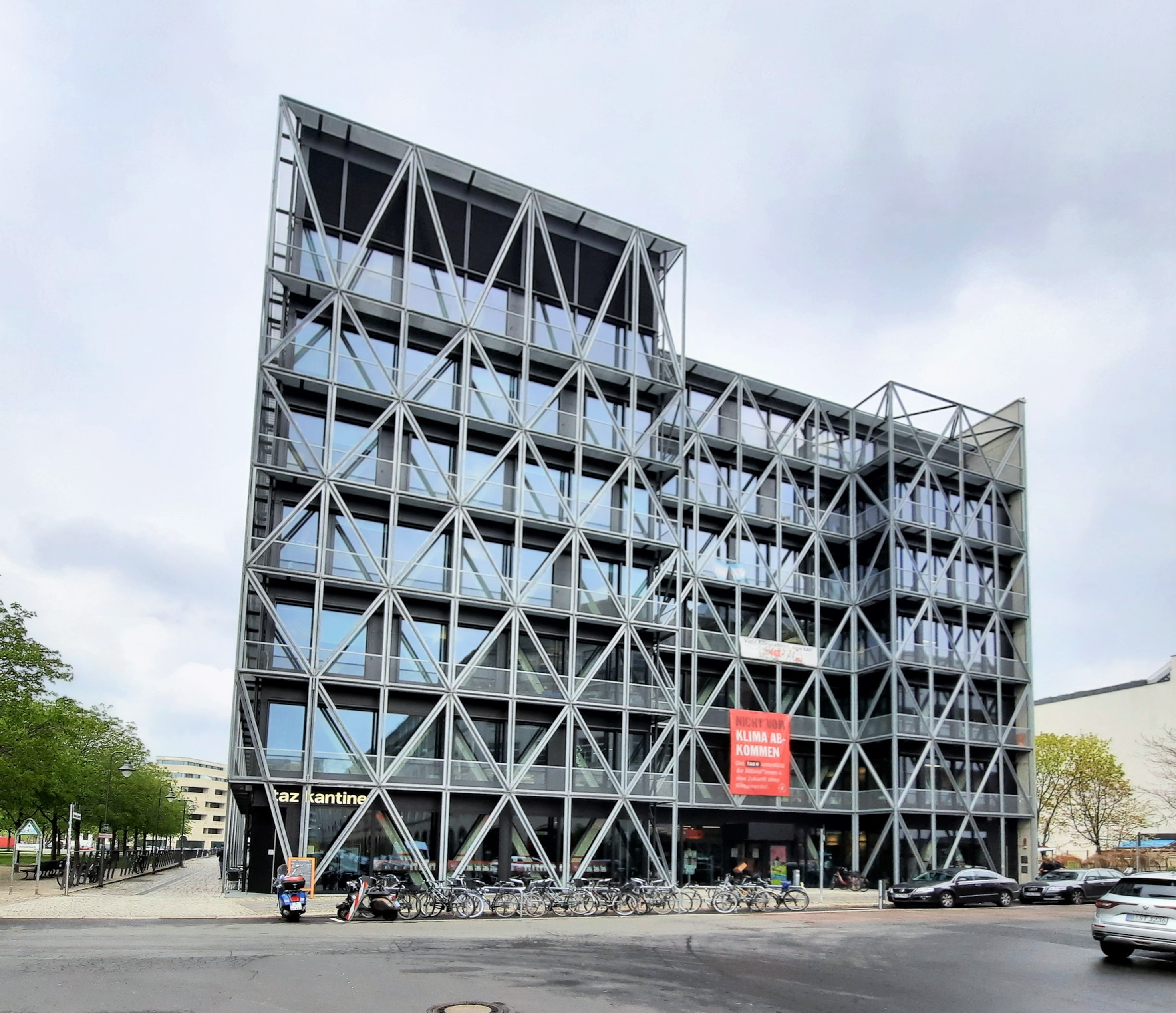
The head office building of Die Tageszeitung in Friedrichstraße, Kreuzberg, Berlin, Germany

Die Tageszeitung was established in 1978. From the beginning, Die Tageszeitung was intended to be an alternative to the mainstream press, in its own words: "irreverent, commercially independent, intelligent and entertaining." One expression of its alternative approach to journalism was the policy of uniform salaries for all employees until 1991. Nowadays, employees in senior editorial positions receive bonuses; however, management salaries at Die Tageszeitung remain considerably lower than those in the rest of the industry.

Since 1995, the WOZ Die Wochenzeitung (formerly WoZ) and Die Tageszeitung have included a German-language edition of the monthly Le Monde diplomatique to supplement the newspapers. Most of the articles in the monthly supplement are translations of the French-language edition of Le Monde diplomatique. During its publication run, taz also included the German Turkish-language newspaper Perşembe.

Since 1992, Die Tageszeitung has been owned by a reader cooperative, which surpassed 25,000 members by late 2025. In 1995, it became the first German national newspaper to make all of the content of each issue available online.

In 2000, Bascha Mika, editor of taz since 1988 took over as editor-in-chief in 2000. She restructured the editorial team to better showcase the journalistic work and professionalized the workflows. During her tenure, a news desk and established organizational structures were introduced.

In 2009 Ines Pohl took over. She exposed the newspaper to the broad mainstream. Pohl opted for tabloidization, believing she could secure the paper a prominent position through pointed, opinionated framing and targeted campaigns. In the 2013 elections the newspaper was among the supporters of the Social Democratic Party.

In 2015, the so-called "keylogger affair" occurred at the newspaper taz. Staff journalist Sebastian Heiser used a keylogger to record keystrokes on various computers in the newsroom and fled to Cambodia after being exposed. Those affected included section heads, regular staff journalists, and interns; however, a striking number of the victims were women (19 out of 23)—mostly young female interns. He read their private emails, chats, and passwords, and in at least one instance, logged into someone else's Facebook account without authorization. Investigations suggested that his behavior was primarily driven by voyeurism and a need for control, coupled with a personal obsession with surveillance methods and the exploitation of security vulnerabilities.

From 2015 to 2020 Georg Löwitsch was edito-in-chief. In response to the declining print circulation affecting all newspapers, he focused on a strong push toward digitalization. The "Scenario 2022" plan was developed during his tenure. The content strategy was heavily shifted toward in-depth reportage and exclusive digital stories in order to expand the online presence.

Facing long-term shifts in print subscriptions, the cooperative launched a transformation program termed the "Seitenwende", officially ending the printed weekday issue on 17 October 2025 in favor of digital distribution via apps and e-paper, while preserving the Saturday print edition. According to industry data in early 2026, nearly 90 percent of weekday print subscribers remained with the digital or weekend hybrid models.

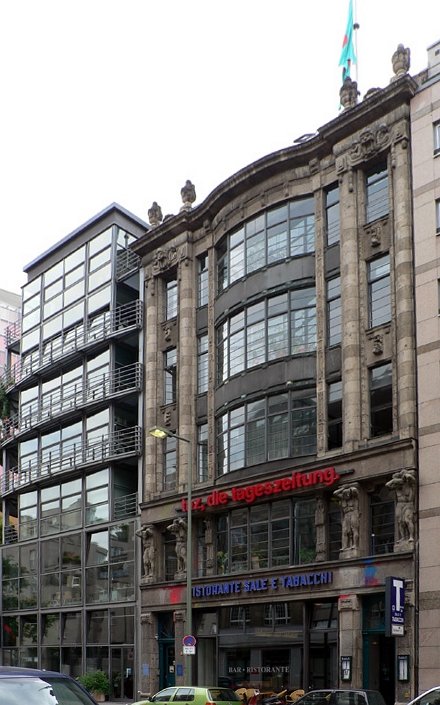
Former head office of Die Tageszeitung in the Rudi-Dutschke-Strasse in the Berlin district of Kreuzberg

From the beginning, Die Tageszeitung appeared in a nationwide edition as well as in a Berlin local edition. Over the years, local editorial offices for North Rhine-Westphalia (NRW), Hamburg and Bremen were added. While the latter two were merged into "taz nord" (North), the NRW offices were closed as of July 2007.

Taz was the first and only newspaper to have an independent Turkish-language edition online, known as taz.gazete between 2017 and 2020. It was also among the first to publish articles in plain German (Leichte Sprache) for readers with learning difficulties. It publishes occasionally in English as taz in English.

== Structure ==
The newspaper is organized as a cooperative under German law, largely financed through cooperative memberships and voluntary community contributions rather than conventional paywalls. Its voluntary payment initiative, "taz zahl ich", reached over 50,000 contributing readers by mid-2026. taz employees are paid under the collective agreement for newspapers in Germany.

== Political stance ==
In its founding years, taz covered the political spectrum of the extra-parliamentary opposition (APO) in West Germany in its debates and editorial opinions. Its political stance was mostly close to Alliance 90/The Greens, the SPD and later the PDS. The newspaper identified less with the PDS's successor party, The Left. In the 2000s, the newspaper aligned more closely with the centrist wing of Alliance 90/The Greens.

In late 2021, long-time taz journalist Ulrich Schulte left the newspaper to become head of the press office of the Federal Ministry for the Environment and Consumer Protection (BMUV), led by Steffi Lemke (Alliance 90/The Greens).

=== "Potato Affair" ===
On 26 June 2006 Die Tageszeitung published a satirical article on its last page, headlined Die Wahrheit (the truth) that is reserved for satire and humor. It was titled "The new potato of Poland. Rogues who want to rule the world. Today: Lech 'Katsche' Kaczynski". This article ridiculed Polish president Lech Kaczyński and prime minister Jarosław Kaczyński. Lech Kaczyński subsequently cancelled talks scheduled between Germany, Poland and France (the Weimar Triangle), citing health reasons.

=== Israeli–Palestinian conflict ===
In November 2023, Palestinian author Adania Shibli applied for a preliminary injunction in Hamburg against Die Tageszeitung after it published an article calling her a "committed BDS activist." The injunction was dismissed by the court, which noted she had signed a 2007 open letter urging The Rolling Stones not to play in Israel and a 2019 open letter criticizing the organizers of a literary prize derailed by BDS activists.

Die Tageszeitung was among German media outlets that published unverified claims about the October 7 attacks that later drew criticism. taz addressed this problematic reporting of its own.

Die Tageszeitung is part of the dispute over the interpretive sovereignty of German relationship to Israel and Palestine in the Israeli–Palestinian conflict. German Jacobin magazine said in 2025, taz had an "pro-Israel stance" in its reporting on the Israeli–Palestinian conflict. In August 2025, German journalist Hanno Hauenstein argued that coverage by Die Tageszeitung and other German media outlets contributed to legitimizing the killing of Palestinian journalists in Gaza by the Israeli military.

The corespondent of taz for Israel and Palestine, Serena Bilanceri was searched on Tel Aviv Airport Ben Gurion in 2025 when she was traveling to Vienna, Austria to receive the Piazza Grande Journalism Award. Her labtop was confiscated by the Israeli authorithys and after 9 days Bilanceri got the device back heavily destroyed. Reporter without Borders RSF were investigating the case and find, that a access to and spying on the computer by Israel authorithys was highly likely.

When she attempted to re-enter Israel from Germany in October 2026 before the Israel national elections, the Israeli government denied her entry because she had reported critically on its policies. The Ministry of Diaspora Affairs and Combating Antisemitism stated that this decision was linked to two of her opinion pieces in tageszeitung made in 2025. Bilanceri had criticized the catastrophic humanitarian situation in the Gaza Strip and advocated for sanctions against Israel. She also criticized violence by right-wing settlers against Palestinians in the West Bank. The Ministery Director General Avi Cohen Scali is quoted as saying: "Anti-Israel elements and those who defame Israel should not set foot on Israeli soil. We will not tolerate calls to boycott Israel under the guise of professional journalism."

== Headlines ==
The taz is noted for its tongue-in-cheek headlines, such as:

- Oh mein Gott! (Oh my god!) – On the election of Joseph Ratzinger as Pope Benedict XVI
- Es ist ein Mädchen (It's a girl) – On the election of Angela Merkel as the first female Chancellor of Germany
- Oops – they did it again! – On the re-election of George W. Bush as President of the United States

On 5 June 2008, the paper published a picture headlined "Onkel Baracks Hütte" (Uncle Barack's Cabin) with a picture of the White House below the headline as part of an article about then-Senator Barack Obama. That headline, which made reference to the book Uncle Tom's Cabin, was perceived as racist by some of its readership.

== taz Panter Foundation ==
The taz Panter Foundation is an incorporated non-profit foundation based in Berlin. Its legal status enables taz to separate its charitable and civic activities from regular commercial publishing operations. It was established in 2008 to oversee the annual taz Panter Prize, which has been awarded since 2005.

The foundation focuses on three main objectives: First, it conducts international workshops to train foreign journalists, primarily from countries where press freedom is under threat. Second, it provides journalistic training and continuing education programs, particularly for younger participants. Third, it promotes democracy and civic engagement through initiatives such as the annual Panter Prize.

== See also ==
- List of newspapers in Germany
- Friede sei mit Dir
- Die Datenschleuder
- Bascha Mika

== Literature ==
- taz - die tageszeitung. Die Tageszeitung Verlagsgenossenschaft e. G., Berlin 1.1987,1ff. ISSN 0931-9085
- Oliver Tolmein/Detlef zum Winkel: tazsachen. Kralle zeigen - Pfötchen geben. Hamburg 1988. ISBN 3-922144-76-4
- Jörg Magenau: Die taz. Eine Zeitung als Lebensform. München 2007, ISBN 978-3-446-20942-8
- Nora Münz: Links und liebenswert. Nutzungsmotive von Lesern der tageszeitung (taz). In: Senta Pfaff-Rüdiger / Michael Meyen (Hg.): Alltag, Lebenswelt und Medien. Lit Verlag. Münster 2007. S. 215–235. ISBN 978-3-8258-0897-6
