= Friede Springer =

German publisher (born 1942)

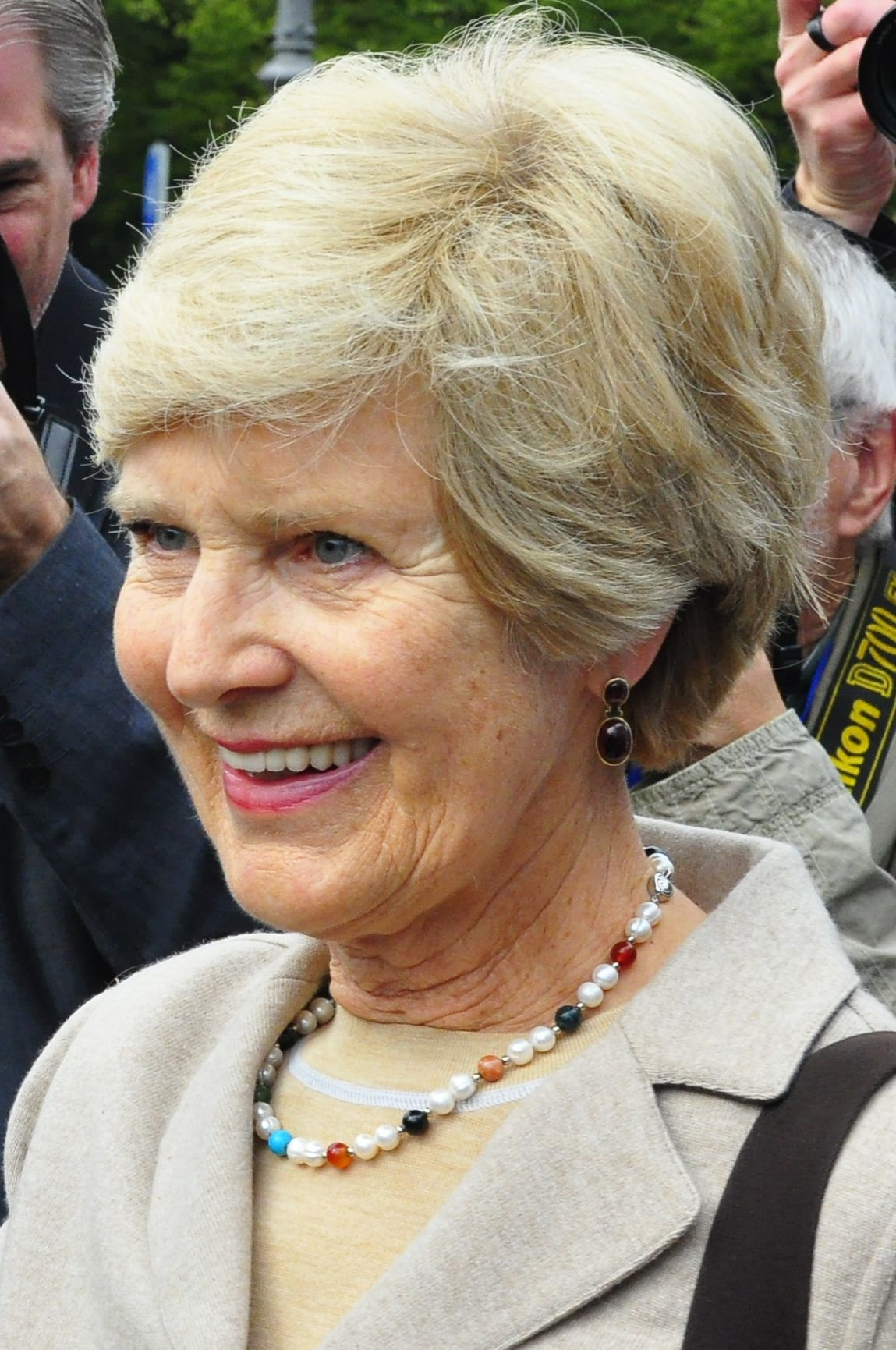
- Springer in 2014
- Born: Friede Riewerts; 15 August 1942 (age 83); Oldsum, Föhr, Germany
- Occupation: Publisher
- Political party: Christian Democratic Union
- Board member of: Axel Springer AG
- Spouse: Axel Springer (m. 1978; died 1985)

Friede Springer (born Friede Riewerts, 15 August 1942) is a German publisher and widow of Axel Springer. She is the main owner of the Axel Springer SE media conglomerate – and thus of Europe's largest newspaper Bild – being one of the richest people of Germany.

== Biography ==
A Frisian gardener's daughter, she worked as a nanny at the Springer family's home from 1965 onwards and later became Springer's lover and eventual partner. In 1978 she became Springer's fifth (and last) wife. She is a member of the Independent Evangelical-Lutheran Church in Germany.

After Axel Springer's death she, together with children and grandchildren from his prior marriages, inherited Springer's shares in his publishing trust. At the time, Springer was still holding 26.1 per cent of the corporation, the rest was held by the Bavarian film trader Leo Kirch, the Burda family and several minor investors. Subsequently she became manager of Axel Springer AG and sole executive manager of the Springer Holding.

Under her guidance, the Springer heirs bought back the company's shares from the two Burda brothers for about DM 531 million in 1988. Five years prior, the brothers had paid half that sum for their share. As Springer's children leaned up against her in the following years, she bought the family members out and thus took over their shares. In 2002, she (formally being the company's governing body) installed Mathias Döpfner as the new chairman of the board. He led the Springer AG out of its crisis and dissolved the tight bond with Munich based entrepreneur Leo Kirch.

As of July 2015, Friede Springer sits as deputy chairwoman on the supervisory board of Axel Springer AG and is the largest shareholder of the company. She owns 5.6% of Springer AG's stocks directly and has a 90% shareholding of Axel Springer Gesellschaft für Publizistik GmbH & Co. KG, which in turn has a stake of 51.5% in Axel Springer AG. According to the Forbes magazine, she owned a private fortune of US$5.1 billion (as of November 2017), thereby ranking as the 31st richest person on the list of Germany's wealthiest people and the 460th worldwide.

She is a friend of Angela Merkel and also a party member of the Christian Democratic Union. As such she participated in the 12th Federal Assembly in 2004 to elect the President of Germany.

== Other activities ==
- Axel Springer Foundation, Chairwoman of the Board of Trustees
- Friede Springer Foundation, Chairwoman of the Board of Trustees (since 2011)
- Friends of the Fraenkelufer Synagogue, Member of the Board of Trustees
- Co-founder of the Virchow Foundation

== Recognition ==
Among the decorations Springer received was the Order of Merit of Berlin in 1988, the Great Cross of Merit of the Federal Republic of Germany in 1996, the Leo Baeck Prize by the Central Council of Jews in Germany in 2000, the Bavarian Order of Merit in 2004 and the Order of Merit of Saxony-Anhalt in 2019.
