= List of tallest structures in Germany =

This is a list of Germany's tallest structures, containing all types of structures. Please correct and expand this list.

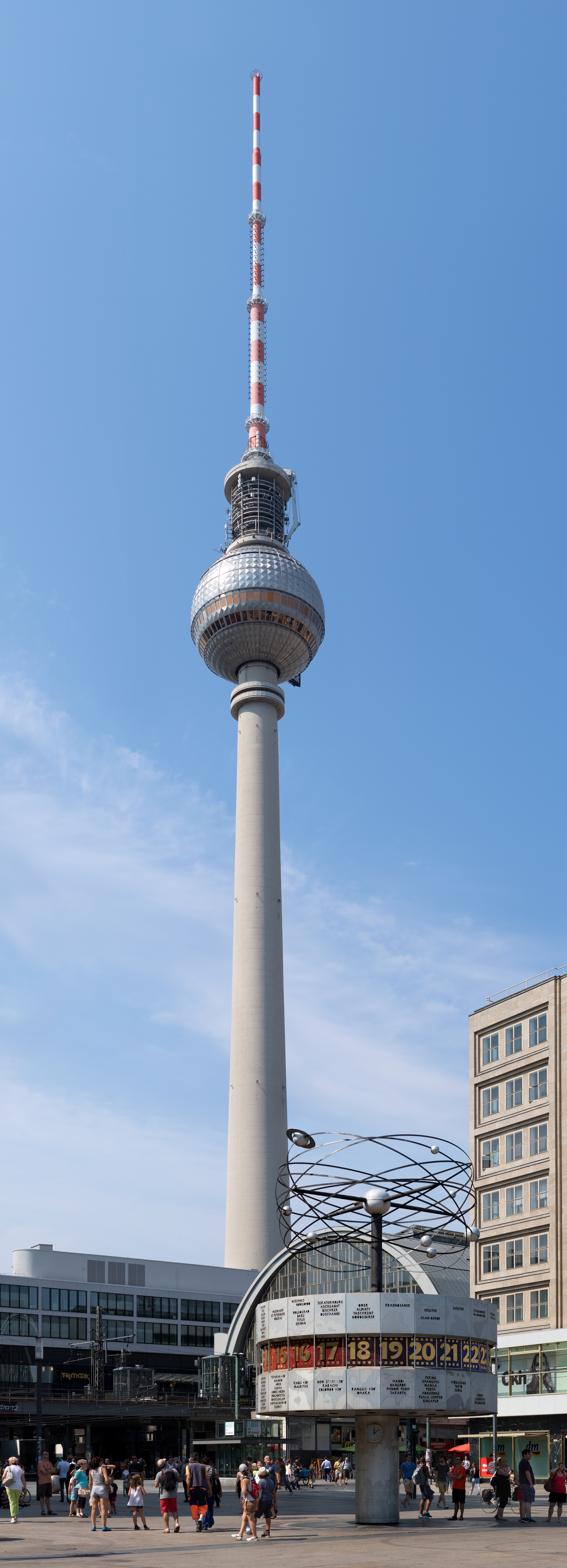
Fernsehturm Berlin

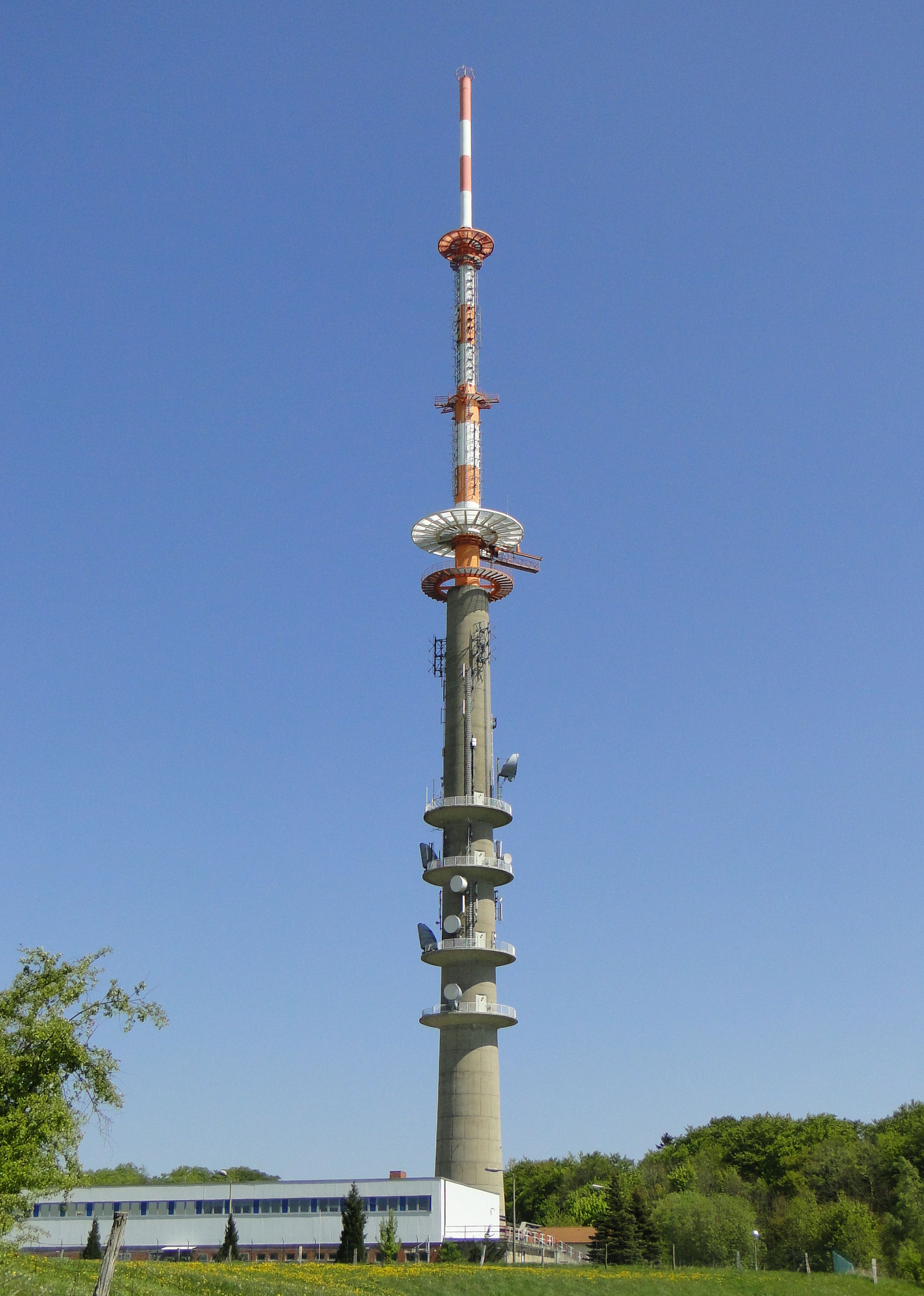
Helpterberg Radio Tower

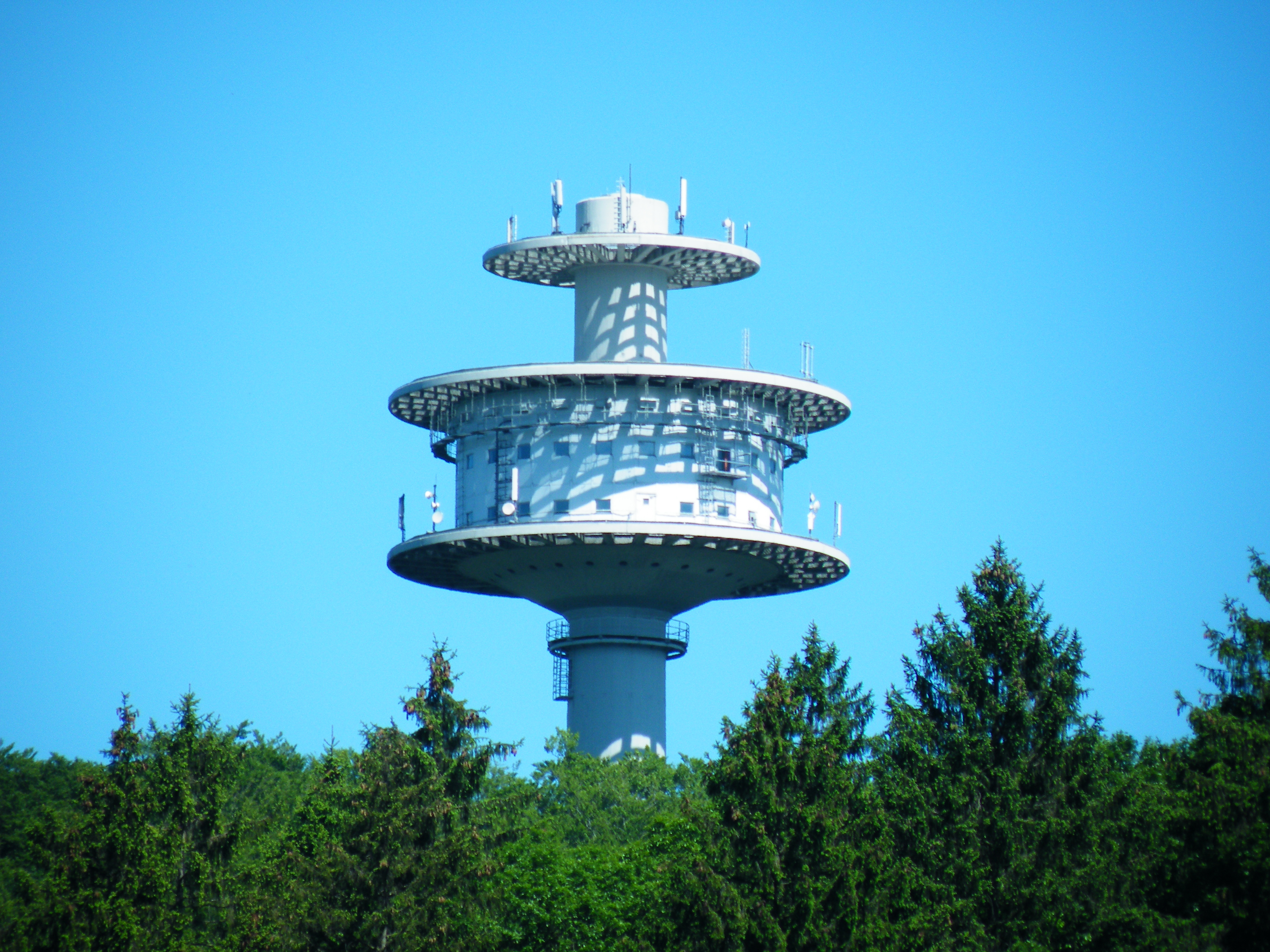
Allenberg Telecommunication Tower

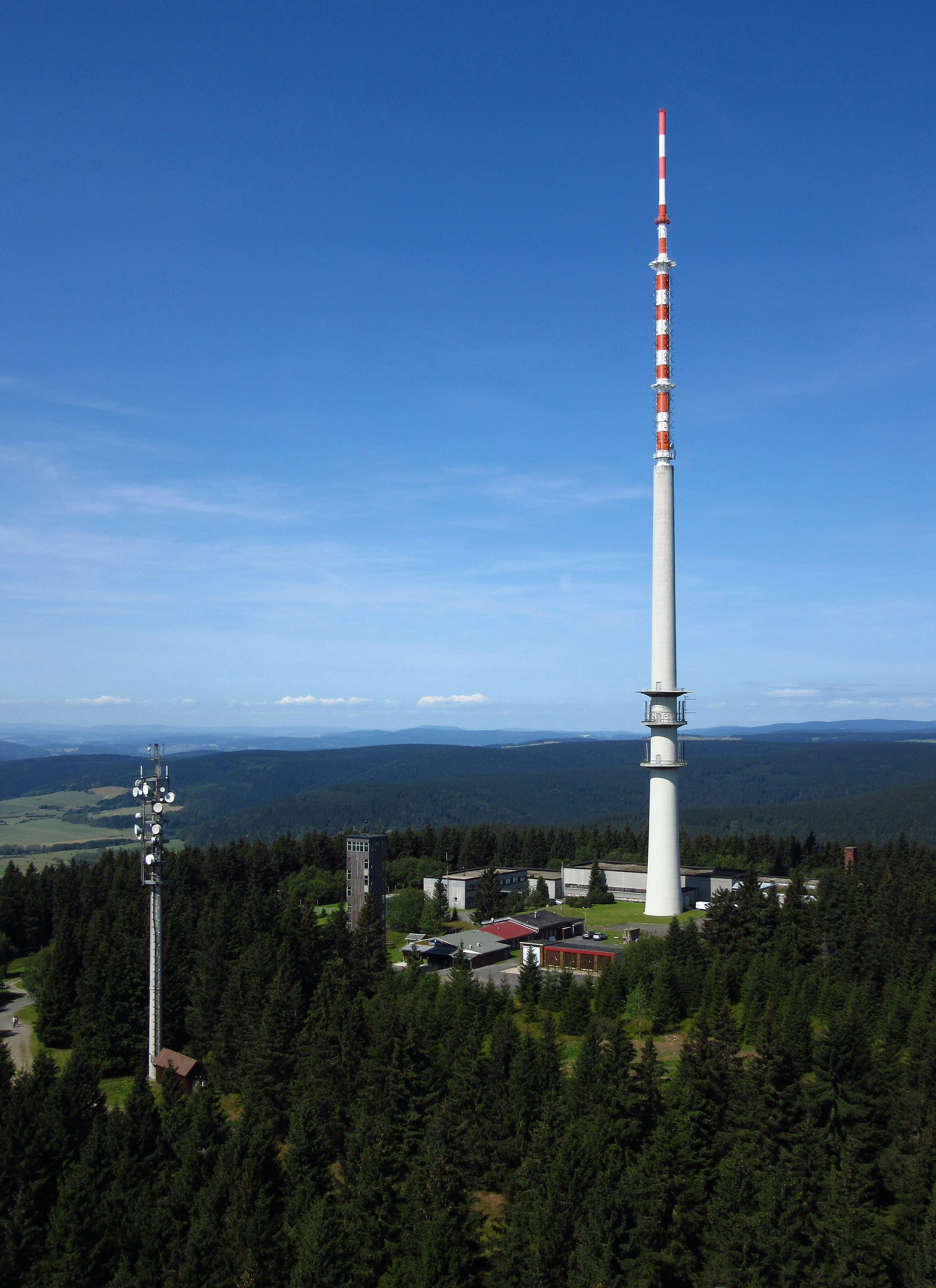
Transmitter Bleßberg

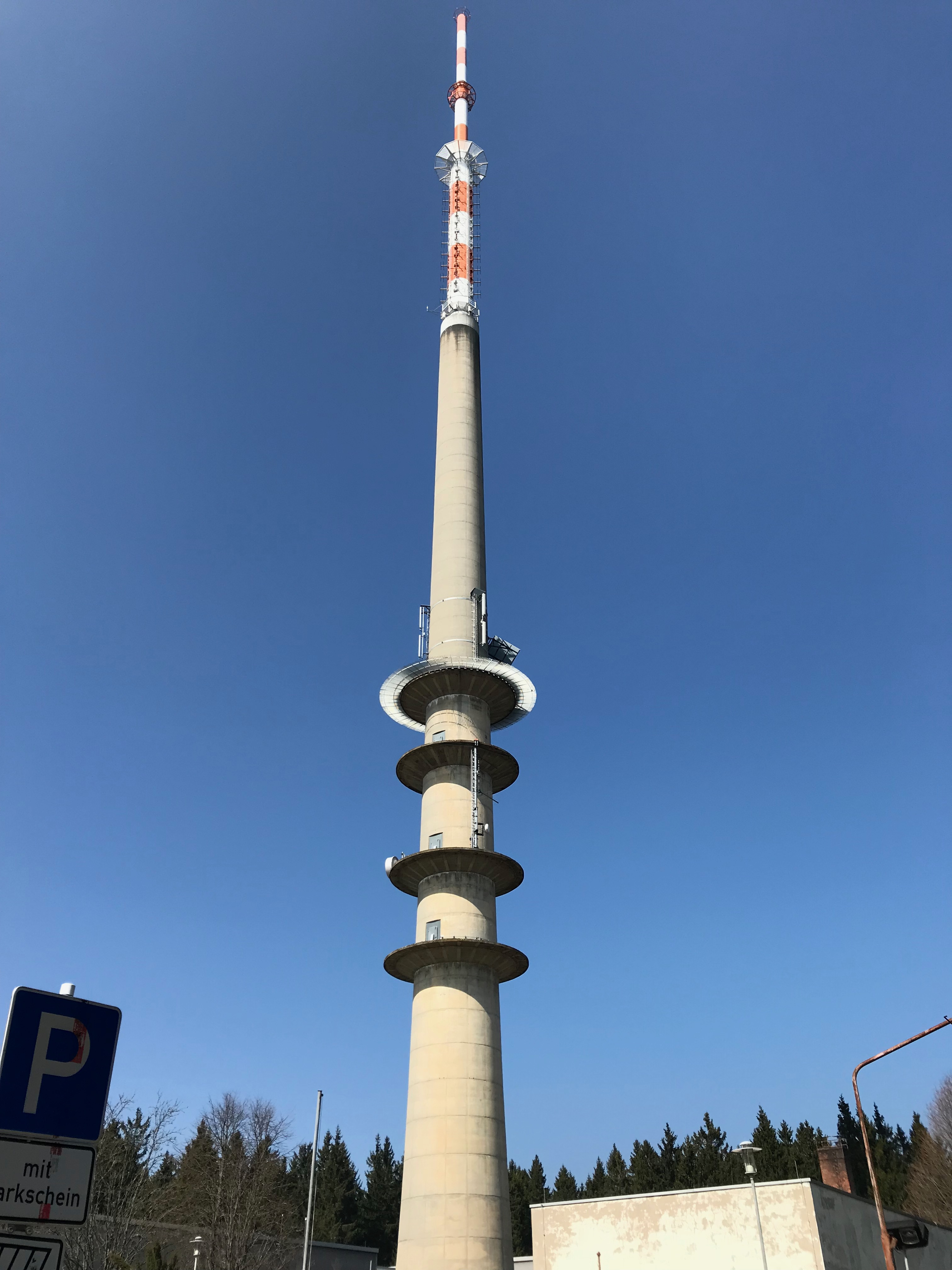
Geyer Transmitter

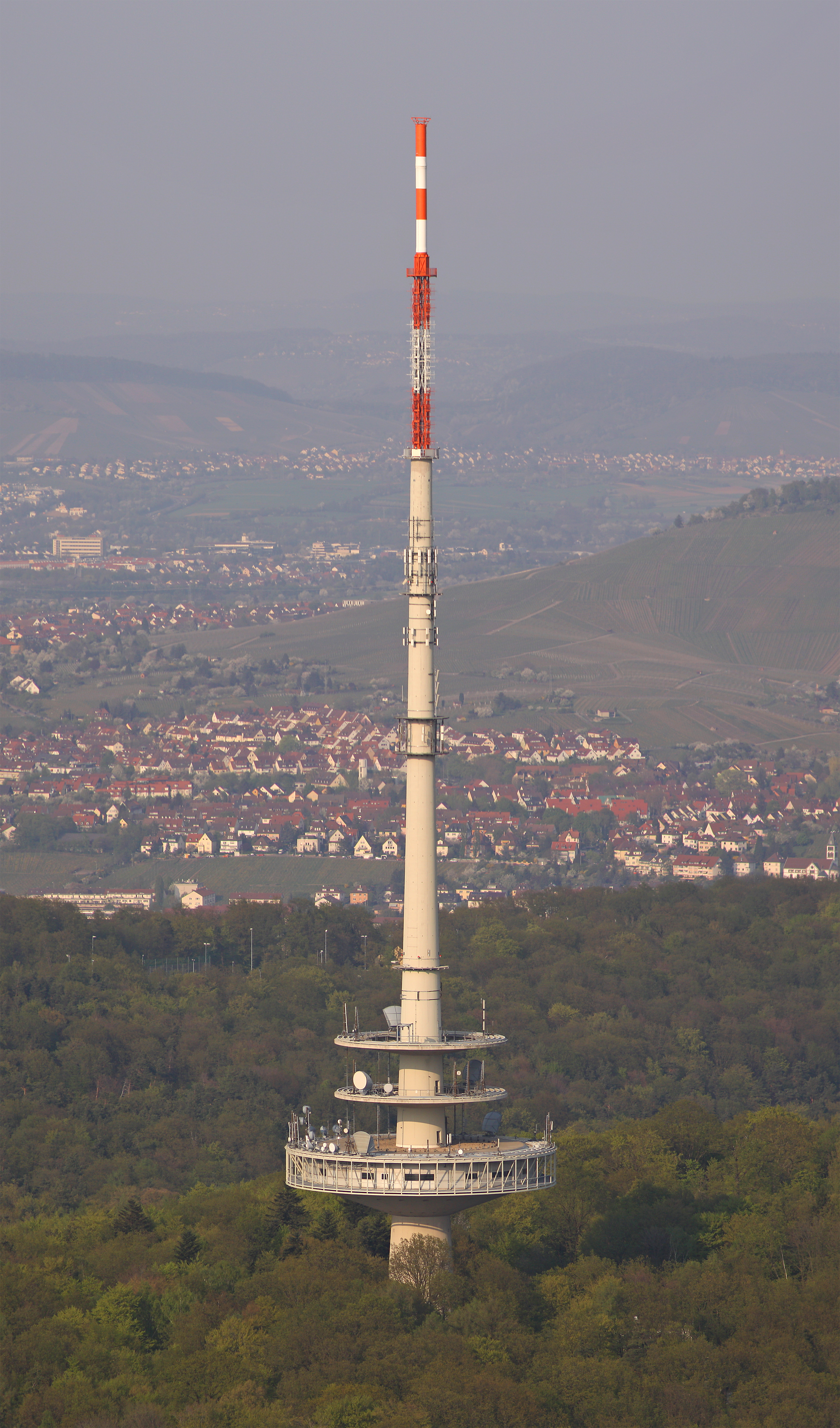
Fernmeldeturm Frauenkopf in Stuttgart, Germany, viewed from Stuttgart Inn.

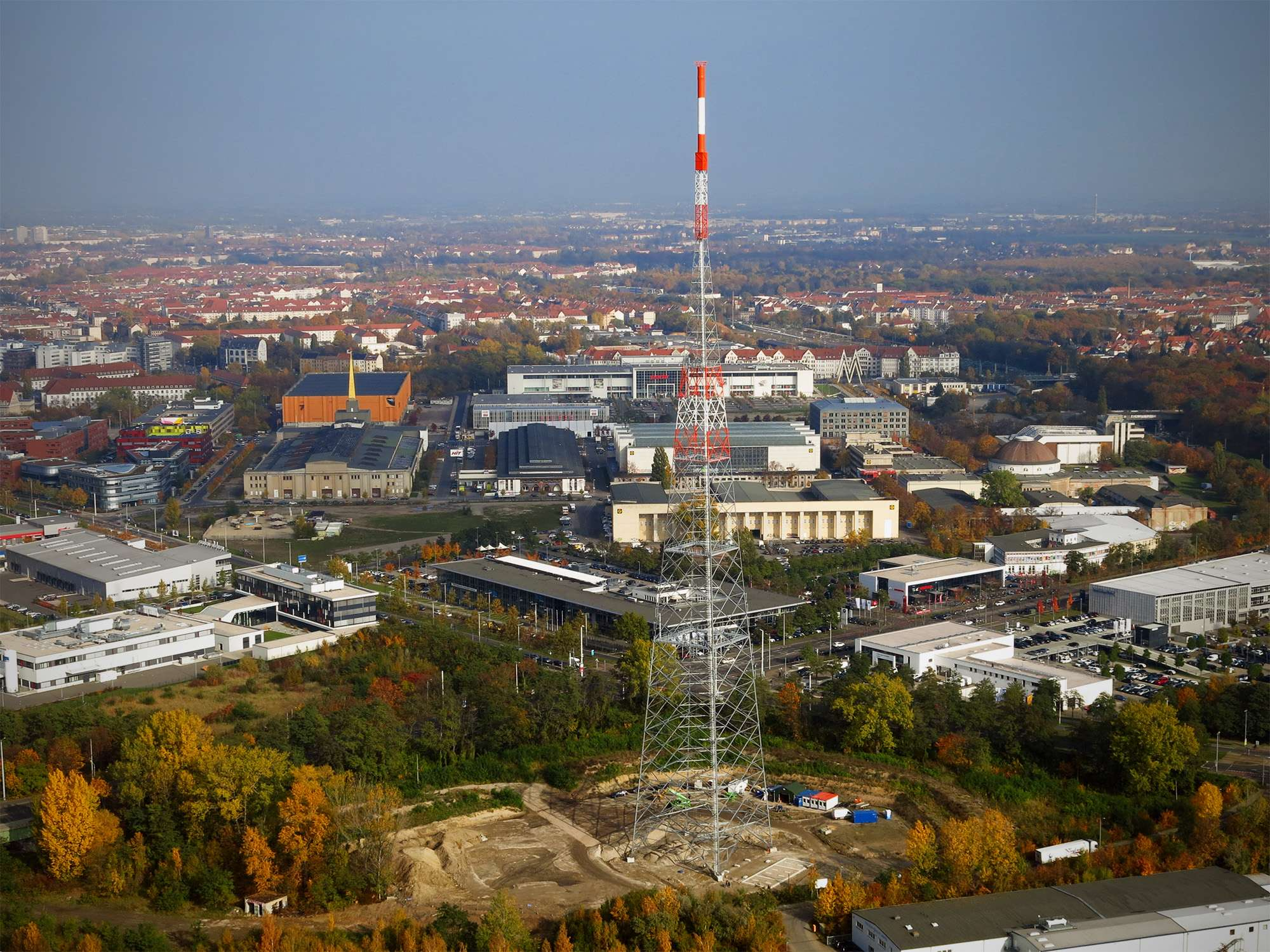
Funkturm Leipzig

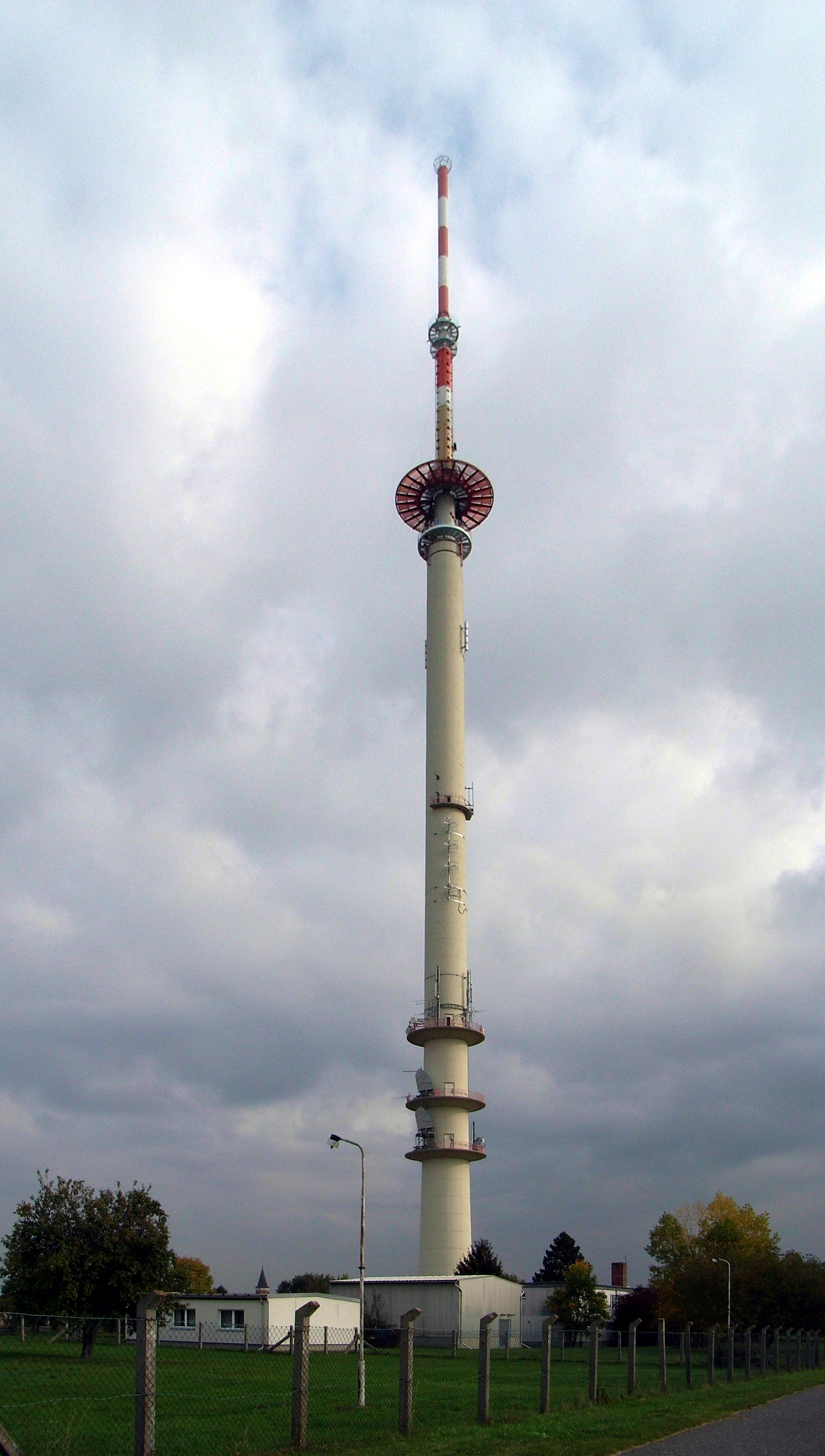
Telecommunications tower calau

Name	Pinnacle height		Year	Construction type	Town	State	Coordinates	Remarks
Berliner Fernsehturm	1207 ft	368 m	1969	Tower	Berlin	Berlin	52°31′14.91″N 13°24′33.95″E	became the tallest building in (all of) Germany since reunification
Sender Donebach	1191 ft	363 m	1982	Guyed Mast	Mudau-Donebach	Baden-Württemberg	49°33′40.25″N 9°10′22.76″E ; 49°33′33.53″N 9°10′50.82″E	prior to the reunification, it was the tallest structure in West Germany; both masts demolished on March 2, 2018
Sender Zehlendorf, new longwave transmission mast	1180 ft	359.7 m	1979	Guyed Mast	Zehlendorf bei Oranienburg	Brandenburg	52°47′41.87″N 13°23′9.5″E	demolished in 2017
Richtfunkstelle Berlin-Frohnau	1177 ft	358.6 m	1978	Guyed Mast	Berlin-Frohnau	Berlin	52°39′13.66″N 13°17′43.59″E	demolished on February 8, 2009
VLF transmitter DHO38	1158 ft	352.9 m	1982	Guyed Mast	Saterland-Ramsloh	Lower Saxony	53°05′22.15″N 07°37′06.19″E ; 53°05′14.42″N 07°36′31.14″E ; 53°04′59.81″N 07°37′09.88″E ; 53°04′52.03″N 07°36′34.69″E ; 53°04′36.16″N 07°36′58.79″E ; 53°04′30.05″N 07°36′22.87″E ; 53°04′10.66″N 07°36′41.82″E ; 53°04′16.8″N 07°37′17.66″E	8 masts, insulated against ground
Sender Zehlendorf, old longwave transmission mast	1152 ft	351 m	1962	Guyed Mast	Zehlendorf bei Oranienburg	Brandenburg	52°47′41.87″N 13°23′9.5″E	destroyed on May 18, 1978 at aircraft collision
Sendemast SL3	1148 ft	350 m	1968	Guyed Mast	Burg bei Magdeburg	Saxony-Anhalt	52°16′9.35″N 11°55′28.84″E	collapsed on February 18, 1976
Gartow-Höhbeck transmitter, Radio mast Gartow 2	1129 ft	344 m	1977/78	Guyed Mast	Gartow	Lower Saxony	53°3′55.8″N 11°26′33.9″E	
Europaturm	1107 ft	337.5 m	1979	Tower	Frankfurt/Main	Hesse	50°8′7.02″N 8°39′16.9″E	
Chimney of Westerholt Power Station	1107 ft	337.5 m	1997	Chimney	Gelsenkirchen	Northrhine-Westphalia	51°36′4.48″N 7°3′52.16″E	demolished in 2006
Deutschlandsender Herzberg/Elster	1106 ft	337 m	1939	Guyed Mast	Herzberg/Elster	Brandenburg	51°42′59.76″N 13°15′51.5″E	insulated against ground, dismantled in 1946
Radio mast Gartow 1	1073 ft	327 m	1963	Guyed Mast	Gartow	Lower Saxony	53°4′7.82″N 11°26′22.42″E	demolished on August 20, 2009
Behren-Bokel Transmitter	1060 ft	323 m	1961	Guyed Mast	Behren-Bekel	Lower Saxony	52°47′38.23″N 10°31′57.15″E	
Longwave radio mast Burg	1060 ft	323 m	1953	Guyed Mast	Burg bei Magdeburg	Saxony-Anhalt	52°17′12.93″N 11°53′50.52″E	
FM and TV-mast Wesel	1060 ft	323 m	1968	Guyed Mast	Wesel	North Rhine-Westphalia	51°38′56.05″N 6°34′40.47″E	
Sender Scharteberg	991 ft	302 m	1985	Guyed Mast	Scharteberg Mountain	Rhineland-Palatinate	50°13′7.43″N 6°45′1.46″E	
Sender Bielstein	991 ft	302 m	1985/86	Guyed Mast	Bielstein Mountain	North Rhine-Westphalia	51°54′21.74″N 8°49′18.47″E	
Chimney of Power Plant Scholven	991 ft	302 m		Chimney	Gelsenkirchen	North Rhine-Westphalia	51°36′12.84″N 7°0′7.44″E ; 51°36′2.06″N 7°0′16.56″E	
Main radio mast Langenberg	988 ft	301 m	1989	Guyed Mast	Velbert-Langenberg	North Rhine-Westphalia	51°21′22.64″N 7°8′2.84″E	
UKW-Sendemast Hamburg	984 ft	300 m	1960	Guyed Mast	Hamburg-Billstedt	Hamburg	53°31′9.14″N 10°6′10.11″E	
Chimney of Power Plant Jänschwalde	984 ft	300 m	1981	Chimney	Jänschwalde	Brandenburg	51°49′56.07″N 14°27′10.89″E ; 51°49′55.76″N 14°27′25.89″E ; 51°49′55.5″N 14°27′40.96″E	
Chimney of Power Plant Chemnitz	984 ft	300 m		Chimney	Chemnitz	Saxony	50°51′28.01″N 12°55′25.79″E	
Chimney of Buschhaus Power Station	984 ft	300 m	1984	Chimney	Helmstedt	Lower-Saxony	52°10′18.35″N 10°58′37.89″E	
Chimney of Herne Power Station	984 ft	300 m	1989	Chimney	Herne	Northrhine-Westphalia	51°33′2.36″N 7°11′15.27″E	
Chimney of Walsum Power Station	984 ft	300 m	1988	Chimney	Walsum	Northrhine-Westphalia	51°31′42.81″N 6°42′52.54″E	
Chimney of Lippendorf Power Station	984 ft	300 m	1967	Chimney	Lippendorf	Saxony	51°10′36.37″N 12°22′34.94″E	demolished in 2005
Chimney of Thierbach Power Station	984 ft	300 m		Chimney	Espenhain	Saxony	51°10′4.83″N 12°30′28.89″E	demolished in October 2002
Chimneys of Boxberg Power Station	984 ft	300 m		Chimney	Boxberg	Saxony	51°24′53.95″N 14°33′41.76″E ; 51°24′55″N 14°33′48.94″E ; 51°24′57.17″N 14°34′0.18″E ; 51°24′59.93″N 14°34′19.09″E	
Chimneys of Marl-Chemiepark Power Station	984 ft	300 m		Chimney	Marl	Northrhine-Westphalia	51°41′34″N 7°6′33″E	demolished
Transmitter Steinkimmen	978 ft	298 m	1956	Guyed Mast	Steinkimmen	Lower Saxony	53°2′36.02″N 8°27′31.17″E	
Fernmeldeturm Nürnberg	958 ft	292 m	1977	Tower	Nuremberg	Bavaria	49°25′33.46″N 11°2′20.29″E	
Olympiaturm	950 ft	289.5 m	1968	Tower	Munich	Bavaria	48°10′27.79″N 11°33′13.56″E	
Transmitter Riegelsberg	942 ft	287 m		Guyed Mast	Riegelsberg	Saarland	49°17′28.79″N 6°55′17.19″E	
Telemax	926 ft	282.2 m	1992	Tower	Hannover	Lower-Saxony	52°23′34.72″N 9°47′58.89″E	
Chimney of Bergkamen Power Station	925 ft	282 m	1981	Chimney	Bergkamen	Northrhine-Westphalia	51°38′12.16″N 7°37′14.05″E	
Chimney of Unit E4 of Werdohl-Elverlingsen Power Station	925 ft	282 m	1982	Chimney	Werdohl	Northrhine-Westphalia	51°16′33.04″N 7°42′26.24″E	demolished
Gersteinwerk Chimney	925 ft	282 m	1984	Chimney	Werne	Northrhine-Westphalia	51°40′24.79″N 7°43′14.28″E	
Longwave transmitter Europe 1, Mast 1	919 ft	282 m	1954/55	Guyed Mast	Felsberg-Berus	Saarland	49°17′4.2″N 6°40′57.73″E	insulated against ground
Longwave transmitter Europe 1, Mast 2	919 ft	280 m	1954/55	Guyed Mast	Felsberg-Berus	Saarland	49°16′55.86″N 6°40′46.16″E	insulated against ground
Transmitter Dieblich-Naßheck	919 ft	280 m		Guyed Mast	Dieblich-Naßheck	Rhineland-Palatinate	50°15′36.13″N 7°31′15.45″E	
Transmitter Torfhaus	918 ft	279.8 m		Guyed Mast	Torfhaus	Lower Saxony	51°48′6.62″N 10°31′55.84″E	
Heinrich-Hertz-Turm	918 ft	279.7 m	1968	Tower	Hamburg	Hamburg	53°33′47.19″N 9°58′32.88″E	
Longwave transmitter Europe 1, Mast 3	906 ft	276 m	1954/55	Guyed Mast	Felsberg-Berus	Saarland	49°16′47.55″N 6°40′34.48″E	insulated against ground
Chimney of Ibbenbüren Power Station	902 ft	275 m	1985	Chimney	Ibbenbüren	Northrhine-Westphalia	52°17′9.11″N 7°44′45.23″E	
Chimney of Rüstersieler Power Station	902 ft	275 m		Chimney	Rüstersieler	Lower-Saxony	53°33′56.93″N 8°8′46.46″E	
Main transmission mast Mühlacker	896 ft	273 m		Guyed Mast	Mühlacker	Baden-Württemberg	48°56′27.67″N 8°51′8.24″E	insulated against ground
Schwerin-Zippendorf Transmission Mast	896 ft	273 m		Guyed Mast	Schwerin	Mecklenburg-Western Pomerania	53°35′30.95″N 11°27′20.09″E	close to TV Tower Schwerin-Zippendorf
Longwave transmitter Europe 1, Mast 4	886 ft	270 m	1954/55	Guyed Mast	Felsberg-Berus	Saarland	49°16′39.18″N 6°40′22.72″E	insulated against ground
Colonius	873 ft	266m	1981	Tower	Cologne	Northrhine-Westphalia	50°56′49.54″N 6°55′55.08″E	
Aholming transmitter	869 ft	265 m		Guyed Mast	Aholming	Bavaria	48°43′50.55″N 12°55′47.04″E ; 48°43′38.46″N 12°56′2.06″E	2 masts
Central masts Nauen	853 ft	260 m	1920	Guyed Mast	Nauen	Brandenburg	52°38′56″N 12°54′30″E	dismantled in 1945
Commerzbank Tower	850 ft	259 m	1997	Skyscraper	Frankfurt/Main	Hesse	50°6′40.26″N 8°40′27.08″E	
Transmitter Dannenberg	846 ft	258 m		Guyed Mast	Dannenberg	Lower Saxony	53°3′55.7″N 10°53′49.91″E	
Messeturm	843 ft	257 m	1990	Skyscraper	Frankfurt/Main	Hesse	50°6′44.51″N 8°39′10.07″E	
longwave transmitter Erching	840 ft	256 m	1953	Guyed Mast	Erching	Bavaria	48°18′11.29″N 11°43′13.63″E	dismantled
Moorburg Power Station Chimney	840 ft	256 m	1974	Chimney	Hamburg	Hamburg	53°29′20″N 9°56′59″E	demolished; at its demolition by explosives on April 24, 2004 further damages occurred, because debris flew on other tracks as calculated
Fernmeldeturm Kühkopf	837 ft	255 m	1975	Tower	Koblenz-Kühkopf	Rhineland-Palatinate	50°18′32.15″N 7°34′10.33″E	
Fernsehturm Dresden-Wachwitz	827 ft	252 m	1969	Tower	Dresden	Saxony	51°2′24.11″N 13°50′19.93″E	
Central Mast Eilvese	820 ft	250 m	1913	Guyed Mast	Eilvese	Lower-Saxony	52°31′40″N 9°24′24″E	demolished in 1931
Chimney of Voerde Power Station	820 ft	250 m	1982	Chimney	Voerde	Northrhine-Westphalia	51°34′37.65″N 6°40′53.19″E	
Chimney Grosskrotzenburg Power Station	820 ft	250 m		Chimney	Großkrotzenburg	Hessen	50°5′17.76″N 8°57′5.97″E	
Chimney Lünen Power Station	820 ft	250 m		Chimney	Lünen	Northrhine-Westphalia	51°36′50.79″N 7°28′53.12″E	
Chimney of Unit 6 of Bremen-Hafen Power Station	820 ft	250 m		Chimney	Bremen	Bremen	53°7′29.54″N 8°43′43.11″E	
Chimney of Altbach Power Station	820 ft	250 m		Chimney	Altbach	Baden-Württemberg	48°43′1.42″N 9°22′2.91″E ; 48°43′2.77″N 9°22′26.82″E	
Chimney of Heilbronn Power Station	820 ft	250 m		Chimney	Heilbronn	Baden-Württemberg	49°10′31.91″N 9°12′27.19″E ; 49°10′29.67″N 9°12′26.47″E	
Chimney of Hagenwerder Power Plant, Unit III	820 ft	250 m	1972/73	Chimney	Görlitz/Hagenwerder	Saxony	51°3′42″N 14°56′55″E	demolished by explosives on June 19, 1998
Chimney of Wilhelmshaven Power Station (E.ON)	820 ft	250 m	1976	Chimney	Wilhelmshaven	Lower Saxony		
Chimneys Duisburg-Schwelgern	820 ft	250 m		Chimneys	Duisburg	Nordrhein-Westfalen	51°30′14.42″N 6°43′59.6″E ; 51°30′13.42″N 6°44′0.07″E	
ERD-Chimney	820 ft	250 m	1981	Chimney	Duisburg	Nordrhein-Westfalen	51 26 38 N 006 43 45 E	demolished in 1997
Chimney Duisburg-Hochfeld	820 ft	250 m		Chimney	Duisburg	Nordrhein-Westfalen	51°25′20.16″N 6°44′21.48″E	
Chimney of Mehrum Power Station	820 ft	250 m		Chimney	Hohenhameln	Lower Saxony	52°18′54.16″N 10°5′37.65″E	
Chimney of Merkenich Heating Power Station	820 ft	250 m		Chimney	Cologne	Northrhine-Westphalia	51°01′5.03″N 6°57′52.14″E	
Hamburg-Rahlstedt transmitter, new mast	820 ft	250 m	2010	Guyed mast	Hamburg-Rahlstedt	Hamburg	53°37′33″N 10°11′45″E	
Transmitter Berlin-Koepenick, main mast (J1-Mast)	814 ft	248 m	1953	Guyed Mast	Berlin	Berlin	52°28′31″N 13°35′32″E	insulated against ground, demolished
Transmitter Berlin-Koepenick, J2-Mast	814 ft	248 m	1953	Guyed Mast	Berlin	Berlin	52°28′31″N 13°35′32″E	grounded, dismantled in 1984 and rebuilt with reduced height (142.8 m) on site of transmitter Wachenbrunn
Naturstromspeicher Gaildorf		246.5 m	2017	Wind turbine with integrated pumped storage	Gaildorf	Baden-Württemberg	49.010275°N 9.796200°E (for one of four wind turbínes)	178 metre hub height, rotor diameter 137 m, world's tallest wind turbine as of 2017
Rottweil Test Tower		246 m	2017	ThyssenKrupp's Test Tower for elevators	Rottweil	Baden-Württemberg		second highest test tower in the world
Transmitter Saarburg	804 ft	245 m		Guyed Mast	Saarburg	Saarland	49°37′43.41″N 6°36′47.48″E	
Rostock-Krummendorf transmitter	804 ft	245 m	construction	Guyed Mast	Mecklenburg-Western Pomerania	Rostock	54°07′46.04″N 12°07′34.47″E	
Central Tower Königs Wusterhausen	797 ft	243 m	1925	Tower	Königs Wusterhausen	Brandenburg	52°18′19″N 13°36′43″E	collapsed on November 15, 1972
Chimney of Marl-Chemiepark Power Station II	791 ft	241 m		Chimney	Marl	Northrhine-Westphalia	51°41′4.4″N 7°5′59.62″E	
Chimney of Scholven A Power Station	789 ft	240.5 m		Chimney	Gelsenkirchen	Northrhine-Westphalia	51°35′59.83″N 7°0′20.27″E	
Main Tower	787 ft	240 m	1999	Skyscraper	Frankfurt/Main	Hesse	50°6′44.46″N 8°40′19.84″E	roof height: 200 m
Chimney of Voerde Power Station	787 ft	240 m		Chimney	Voerde	Northrhine-Westphalia	51°34′36.29″N 6°41′6.85″E	
Chimneys of Bexbach Power Station	787 ft	240 m		Chimney	Bexbach	Saarland	49°21′48.51″N 7°14′13.38″E	
Chimney of Cuno Power Station	787 ft	240 m		Chimney	Herdecke	Northrhine-Westphalia	51°24′15.41″N 7°24′49.09″E	
Transmitter Thurnau	787 ft	240 m	1980	Guyed Mast	Thurnau	Bavaria	49°59′14.93″N 11°22′36.03″E	insulated against ground
Steel tube radio mast Langenberg	787 ft	240 m	1940/41	Guyed Mast	Velbert-Langenberg	North Rhine-Westphalia		insulated against ground, demolished on April 12, 1945
Transmitter Cremlingen	787 ft	240 m	1965	Guyed Mast	Cremlingen	Lower-Saxony	52°17′37.96″N 10°43′37.32″E	insulated against ground, in 1978 height reduced to 188 m
Bodenseesender, main mast (Teufelsturm)	787 ft	240 m	1978	Guyed Mast	Messkirch	Baden-Württemberg	48°1′24.33″N 9°6′58.44″E	insulated against ground
Wiederau transmitter, J1-mast	774 ft	236 m	1953	Guyed Mast	Wiederau	Free State of Saxony	51°11′4.48″N 12°17′2.85″E	insulated against ground
Bremen-Walle Telecommunication Tower	773 ft	235.7 m	1986	Tower	Bremen-Walle	Bremen	53°5′44.61″N 8°47′30.71″E	
Chimney Power Station Schwandorf	771 ft	235 m		Chimney	Schwandorf	Bavaria	49°18′13.82″N 12°4′39.05″E ; 49°18′14.42″N 12°4′35.33″E	demolished
Rheinturm Düsseldorf	768 ft	234.2 m	1981	Tower	Düsseldorf	Northrhine-Westphalia	51°13′4.37″N 6°45′41.87″E	
Schleptruper Egge transmitter	768 ft	234 m		Guyed Mast	Bramsche	Lower-Saxony	52°22′28.57″N 8°1′47.76″E	
Longwave transmitter Europe 1, backup antenna	768 ft	234 m	1954/55	Guyed Mast	Felsberg-Berus	Saarland	49°17′8.93″N 6°39′31.71″E ; 49°17′1.54″N 6°39′23.6″E	2 masts, insulated against ground
Karlsruhe Rhine Harbour Thermal Power Plant, Large Chimney	764 ft	233 m		Chimney	Karlsruhe	Baden-Württemberg	49°0′41.23″N 8°18′14.26″E	
Chimneys Weiher Power Station	761 ft	232 m		Chimney	Quierschied-Weiher	Saarland	49°20′5.23″N 7°2′7.85″E	
Radio Mast Bungsberg (new)	758 ft	231 m	2005	Guyed Mast	Bungsberg	Schleswig-Holstein	54°13′1.44″N 10°42′59.47″E	close to Fernmeldeturm Bungsberg
Radio Mast Bungsberg (old)	758 ft	231 m	1960	Guyed Mast	Bungsberg	Schleswig-Holstein	54°12′59.66″N 10°43′6.92″E	close to Fernmeldeturm Bungsberg, dismantled in 2006
Dillberg transmitter	758 ft	231 m	1978	Guyed Mast	Dillberg	Bavaria	49°19′24.61″N 11°22′50.42″E	grounded mast with cage antenna for MW
Transmitter Stollberg	758 ft	231 m	1993	Guyed Mast	Stollberg	North Rhine-Westphalia	50°46′43.8″N 6°14′37.14″E	
Fernmeldeturm Kiel	755 ft	230 m	1972	Tower	Kiel	Schleswig-Holstein	54°18′2.25″N 10°7′6.2″E	
Friedrich-Clemens-Gerke Tower	755 ft	230 m	1991	Tower	Cuxhaven	Lower Saxony	53°51′22.72″N 8°40′39.23″E	
Chimney of Voerde Power Station	755 ft	230 m		Chimney	Voerde	Northrhine-Westphalia	51°34′43.66″N 6°40′45.13″E	
Chimney of Castrop-Rauxel Power Station	755 ft	230 m		Chimney	Castrop-Rauxel	Northrhine-Westphalia	51°34′49.37″N 7°18′49.19″E	
Radio mast Berlin-Scholzplatz	755 ft	230 m	1963	Guyed Mast	Berlin	Berlin	52°30′21.82″N 13°13′10.26″E	
Karlsruhe Rhine Harbour Thermal Power Plant, Chimney of Unit 8	755 ft	230 m	2008	Chimney	Karlsruhe	Baden-Württemberg		
Wind Turbine in Hausbay-Bickenbach	673 ft	229.5 m	2016	Wind turbine on concrete-steel tower	Hausbay-Bickenbach	Rhineland-Palatinate		164 metre hub height, rotor diameter 131 m
Radio Mast Leichlingen	751 ft	229 m		Guyed Mast	Leichlingen	Northrhine-Westphalia	51°7′8.54″N 7°6′0.48″E	
Elbe Crossing 2	745 ft	227 m	1976–1978	Lattice tower	Stade	Lower Saxony; Hetlinger Schanze, Schleswig-Holstein	53°35′39.97″N 9°35′28.16″E ; 53°36′8.36″N 9°36′11.71″E	two electricity pylons
Transmitter Aurich-Popens	745 ft	227 m		Guyed Mast	Aurich	Lower Saxony	53°27′41.76″N 7°30′24.83″E	
Lingen transmitter	745 ft	227 m		Guyed Mast	Lingen	Lower Saxony	52°32′6.48″N 7°21′11″E	grounded mast with cage aerial for MF
Chimney of Heyden Power Station	745 ft	227 m		Chimney	Petershagen	Northrhine-Westphalia	52°22′53.79″N 8°59′55.2″E	
Chimney of Erfurt-Ost Heating Power Station	741 ft	226 m		Chimney	Erfurt	Thuringia	51 00 55 N 011 02 23 E	demolished
Chimney of Gera-Nord Heating Power Station (3 Essen)	738 ft	225 m		Chimney	Gera	Thuringia	50°54′18.59″N 12°3′48.34″E ; 50°54′17.65″N 12°3′44.96″E ; 50°54′15.69″N 12°3′48.6″E	
Kirchlinteln transmitter	738 ft	225 m		Guyed Mast	Kirchlinteln	Lower Saxony	52°54′34.27″N 9°18′21.77″E	
Chimney Jena Heating Power Station	738 ft	225 m		Chimney	Jena	Thuringia	50°53′51.53″N 11°35′12.5″E	
Chimney Altchemnitz	738 ft	225 m		Chimney	Altchemnitz	Saxony	50°47′54.9″N 12°55′2.7″E	
Bleialf transmitter	735 ft	224 m		Guyed Mast	Bleialf	Rhineland-Palatinate	50°15′16.77″N 6°21′32.29″E	
Fernmeldeturm Münster 42	730 ft	222.5 m	1986	Tower	Münster	Northrhine-Westphalia	51°56′59.64″N 7°39′58.97″E	
Chimney of Schilling Power Station	722 ft	220 m	1962	Chimney	Stade	Lower Saxony	53°37′7.34″N 9°32′4.98″E	demolished
Chimney of Zolling power station	722 ft	220 m		Chimney	Zolling	Bavaria	48°27′19.05″N 11°47′58.25″E	
Transmitter Hoher Meisner, FM- and TV transmission mast	722 ft	220 m		Guyed Mast	Hoher Meisner	Hesse	51°12′26.21″N 9°50′51.64″E	
Rimberg transmitter	722 ft	220 m		Guyed Mast	Rimberg	Hesse	50°47′50.63″N 9°27′40.31″E	
Peheim transmitter	722 ft	220 m		Guyed Mast	Peheim	Lower-Saxony	52°53′17.47″N 7°50′59.79″E	
Florianturm (Dortmund TV Tower)	720 ft	219.6 m	1959	Tower	Dortmund	Northrhine-Westphalia	51°29′47.71″N 7°28′35.78″E	
Heidenberg transmitter	719 ft	219 m		Guyed Mast	Schwabach	Bavaria	49°17′1.21″N 10°59′12.6″E	
Transmitter Büttelberg	719 ft	219 m		Guyed Mast	Büttelberg	Bavaria	49°24′52.55″N 10°22′40.64″E	
Heidelstein transmitter	715 ft	218 m		Guyed Mast	Heidelstein	Bavaria	50°27′38.12″N 10°0′24.39″E	
Chimney of West Power Station	715 ft	218 m	1970	Chimney	Voerde	Northrhine-Westphalia		
Fernsehturm Stuttgart	711 ft	216,8 m	1956	Tower	Stuttgart-Degerloch	Baden-Württemberg	48°45′20.67″N 9°11′24.76″E	world's first concrete TV tower
Flensburg-Jürgensby transmitter	709 ft	216 m		Guyed Mast	Flensburg-Jürgensby	Schleswig-Holstein	54°48′8″N 9°27′13″E	insulated against ground, demolished in 1990
Flensburg-Engelsby transmitter	705 ft	215 m		Guyed Mast	Flensburg-Engelsby	Schleswig-Holstein	54°47′30.71″N 9°30′12.57″E	grounded mast with cage antenna for MF
Fernmeldeturm Mannheim	698 ft	212.8 m	1975	Tower	Mannheim	Baden-Württemberg	49°29′12.85″N 8°29′31.99″E	
Fernmeldeturm Berlin	696 ft	212 m	1964	Tower	Berlin	Berlin	52°25′3.02″N 13°07′39.92″E	
Transmitter Hühnerberg	696 ft	212 m	1985	Guyed Mast	Hühnerberg	Bavaria	48°47′8.16″N 10°40′6.05″E	
Leher Feld Transmitter, FM/TV-Mast	692 ft	211 m	1951	Guyed Mast	Bremen	Bremen	53°06′25″N 8°52′40″E	demolished on January 31, 1999
Transmitter Göttelborner Höhe	692 ft	211 m	1959	Guyed Mast	Saarbrücken	Saarland	49°20′26.5″N 7°0′55.7″E	
Wiederau transmitter, UHF-mast	692 ft	211 m	1969	Guyed Mast	Wiederau	Saxony	51°11′4.02″N 12°17′7.74″E	
Chimney of old SASOL-Power Station Moers-Meerbeck	689 ft	210 m		Chimney	Moers-Meerbeck	Northrhine-Westphalia	51°28′16″N 6°38′26″E	demolished at the beginning of the 1990s by explosives; tallest actual chimney of Moers-Meerbeck SASOL-works is a 95-metre-tall (312 ft) chimney, which was erected in 1971
Chimney Power Station Dortmund-Derne	689 ft	210 m		Chimney	Dortmund-Derne	Northrhine-Westphalia	51°34′12.38″N 7°31′40.98″E	
Karlsruhe MiRO Oil refinery chimney	689 ft	210 m		Chimney	Karlsruhe	Baden-Württemberg	49°3′33.5″N 8°19′46.91″E	
Karlsruhe Rhine Harbour Thermal Power Plant, Chimney 2	689 ft	210 m		Chimney	Karlsruhe	Baden-Württemberg	49°0′45.25″N 8°18′7.22″E	
Chimney of Gustav Knepper Power Station	689 ft	210 m		Chimney	Dortmund	Northrhine-Westphalia	51°34′06.52″N 7°20′56.77″E	
Goliath transmitter central masts	689 ft	210 m	1943	Guyed Mast	Kalbe an der Milbe	Saxony-Anhalt	52°39′45″N 11°25′27″E	3 guyed masts, insulated against ground, dismantled in 1945
Old TV transmission mast Langenberg	689 ft	210 m	1952	Guyed Mast	Velbert-Langenberg	North Rhine-Westphalia		dismantled in 1998
Transmitter Koenigs Wusterhausen	689 ft	210 m	1925	Guyed Mast	Koenigs Wusterhausen	Brandenburg	52°18′19.23″N 13°37′2.38″E	insulated against ground
Deutschlandsender Zeesen	689 ft	210 m	1927	Guyed Mast	Zeesen	Brandenburg		dismantled
Steel tube radio masts Burg	689 ft	210 m		Guyed Mast	Burg	Saxony-Anhalt	52°17′16.64″N 11°54′24.47″E ; 52°17′17.25″N 11°54′28.56″E	2 masts, insulated against ground, one mast demolished in 2006
Kettrichhof transmitter	689 ft	210 m		Guyed Mast	Lemberg (Palatinate)	Rhineland-Palatinate	49°8′43.51″N 7°35′13.33″E	
Biedenkopf transmitter	689 ft	210 m	1987	Guyed Mast	Biedenkopf	Hesse	50°57′4.14″N 8°31′55.5″E	
New FM-Broadcasting Mast Ismaning	689 ft	210 m	2010	Guyed Mast	Ismaning	Bavaria		
Transmitter Kreuzberg	682 ft	208 m	1985	Guyed Mast	Kreuzberg	Bavaria	50°22′10.22″N 9°58′49.63″E	
Westend Tower	682 ft	208 m	1993	Skyscraper	Frankfurt/Main	Hesse	50°6′38.21″N 8°39′43.93″E	
Chimney Offleben Power Station	679 ft	207 m		Chimney	Offleben	Lower Saxony	52°08′45.64″N 11°01′41.92″E	
Transmitter Hornisgrinde	676 ft	206 m	1972	Tower	Hornisgrinde	Baden-Württemberg	48°36′38.98″N 8°12′6.55″E	
Chimney Knautnaundorf	673 ft	205 m		Chimney	Knautnaundorf	Saxony	51°14′47.47″N 12°16′13.41″E	
Fuhrländer Wind Turbine Laasow	673 ft	205 m	2006	Wind turbine on lattice tower	Laasow	Brandenburg	51°43′15.07″N 14°6′24.39″E	160 metre hub height, rotor with 90 m diameter
Fernsehturm Donnersberg	672 ft	204.82 m	1962	Tower	Donnersberg	Rhineland-Palatinate	49°37′28.55″N 7°55′25.15″E	
Chimney Dresden-Reick	669 ft	204 m	1976	Chimney	Dresden-Reick	Saxony	51°1′28.14″N 13°46′59.78″E	
TV tower Helpterberge	667 ft	203.2 m	1981	Tower	Helpterberge	Mecklenburg-Western Pomerania	53°29′0.88″N 13°36′8.15″E	
Dillberg transmitter, old mast	666 ft	203 m	1956	Guyed mast	Dillberg	Bayern	49°19′26.17″N 11°22′54.15″E	grounded mast with cage antenna for medium wave, height was reduced in 1991 to 184 m and in 2005 increased to 198 m by mounting a transmission antenna for DVB-T on its top
Chimney Power Station Franken II	663 ft	202 m	1963/64	Chimney	Erlangen	Bavaria	49°33′47″N 10°58′25″E	demolished in 2001
Chimney Power Station Mannheim-Neckarau	656 ft	200 m		Chimney	Mannheim-Neckarau	Baden-Württemberg	49°26′40″N 8°29′53″E ; 49°26′36.73″N 8°30′9.76″E	
Chimney of BASF Ludwigshafen	656 ft	200 m		Chimney	Ludwigshafen	Rhineland-Palatinate	49°30′50″N 8°25′52″E	demolished in November 2002
Chimney of Bayer Leverkusen	656 ft	200 m		Chimney	Leverkusen	Northrhine-Westphalia	51°0′45″N 6°58′35.05″E	
Chimney Essen-Karnap	656 ft	200 m		Chimney	Essen-Karnap	Northrhine-Westphalia	51°30′53.98″N 6°59′37.93″E	
Chimney Power Station Hamm-Schmehausen	656 ft	200 m		Chimney	Hamm-Schmehausen	Northrhine-Westphalia	51°40′49.1″N 7°58′12.7″E	
Mainflingen longwave transmitter, Mast VI, Mast VII, Mast VIII, Mast IX, Mast X, Mast XI, Mast XII, Mast XIV, Mast XV	656 ft	200 m		Guyed Masts	Mainhausen-Mainflingen	Hesse	50°0′46.0188″N 9°0′25.4988″E, 50°0′41.6304″N 9°0′38.8836″E, 50°0′39.4956″N 9°0′28.8324″E, 50°0′51.2244″N 9°0′41.382″E, 50°0′53.55″N 9°0′58.7448″E, 50°1′3.7452″N 9°0′51.048″E, 50°1′10.6068″N 9°0′39.5496″E, 50°0′27.0792″N 9°0′55.026″E, 50°0′21.06″N 9°1′9.912″E	multiple guyed masts, insulated against ground carrying T- and triangle antennas for longwave transmitters
Cooling Tower of Niederaussem Power Station	656 ft	200 m		Cooling Tower	Niederaußem	Northrhine-Westphalia	50°59′45.91″N 6°40′16.79″E	world's tallest cooling tower
Chimney of Unit P/Q of Frimmersdorf Power Station	656 ft	200 m		Chimney	Frimmersdorf	Northrhine-Westphalia	51°3′18.17″N 6°34′36.26″E	
Chimney of Irsching Power Station	656 ft	200 m		Chimney	Irsching	Bavaria	48°46′1.32″N 11°34′45.19″E ; 48°46′1.48″N 11°34′49.46″E ; 48°46′1.43″N 11°34′52.92″E	
Chimney of Ingolstadt Power Station	656 ft	200 m		Chimney	Ingolstadt	Bavaria	48°45′43.23″N 11°30′11.73″E	
Stadtwerketurm	656 ft	200 m	1967	Chimney	Duisburg	Northrhine-Westphalia	51°25′47.62″N 6°45′11.24″E	
Large chimney of Duisburg-Huckingen Krupp Mannesmann Blast Furnace Plant	656 ft	200 m	?	Chimney	Duisburg	Northrhine-Westphalia	51°22′15.07″N 6°42′47.82″E	
Chimney Breitungen	656 ft	200 m		Chimney	Breitungen	Thuringia	50°45′29.35″N 10°18′54.28″E	
Lauchhammer-South Heating Plant Chimney	656 ft	200 m		Chimney	Lauchhammer	Saxony	51 28 14 N 013 46 46 E	demolished in 2002
Large Chimney of Schwarzheide Chemical Synthesis Works	656 ft	200 m		Chimney	Schwarzheide	Brandenburg	51 28 49 N 13 53 15 E	demolished
Unterbreizbach K+S Kali Works Chimney	656 ft	200 m		Chimney	Unterbreizbach	Thuringia	50°48′50.84″N 9°58′40.29″E	height reduction to 94 metres in 2001
Chimneys of Wilhelmshaven Refinery	656 ft	200 m		Chimney	Wilhelmshaven	Lower-Saxony	53°36′50.28″N 8°5′27.7″E ; 53°36′53.59″N 8°5′42.9″E	
Chimney of Schkopau Power Station	656 ft	200 m		Chimney	Schkopau	Saxony-Anhalt	51°23′54.44″N 11°57′1.17″E	
Large chimney of PCK Reffinery	656 ft	200 m		Chimney	Schwedt	Brandenburg	53°5′54.06″N 14°13′10.34″E	demolished in November 2003
Black Pump Power Station Chimneys	656 ft	200 m		Chimney	Schwarze Pumpe	Saxony	51°31′41.38″N 14°21′35.65″E ; 51°31′41.35″N 14°21′30.95″E	2 chimneys, demolished in November 2000
Chimney of VEB Elektrokohle Berlin	656 ft	200 m		Chimney	Berlin	Berlin	52° 31′ 36″ N 13° 29′ 27 E	demolished in May 1993
Chimney of Unit E3 of Werdohl-Elverlingsen Power Station	656 ft	200 m	1971	Chimney	Werdohl	Northrhine-Westphalia	51°16′33.46″N 7°42′23.75″E	demolished
Meteorological mast of Karlsruhe Nuclear Research Centre	656 ft	200 m	1972	Guyed Mast	Karlsruhe	Baden-Württemberg	49°5′29.07″N 8°25′29.85″E	
Muldenhütten Chimney I	656 ft	200 m	1972	Chimney	Hilbersdorf	Saxony	50°54′6.77″N 13°23′13.03″E	
Muldenhütten Chimney II	656 ft	200 m	1982	Chimney	Hilbersdorf	Saxony	50°54′8.69″N 13°23′11.49″E	
Large Chimney of Speyer Oil Refinery	656 ft	200 m	1978	Chimney	Speyer	Rhineland-Palatinate		demolished on September 12, 1986 by explosives, after facility was shut down in 1982
Asdonkshof Waste Incineration Plant	656 ft	200 m	1995	Chimney	Kamp-Lintfort	Northrhine-Westphalia	51°31′23.17″N 6°34′31.96″E	
Tower 185	656 ft	200 m	2011	Skyscraper	Frankfurt am Main	Hesse	50°06′36.46″N 8°39′21.03″E	
Rödenser Berg Meteorological Mast	656 ft	200 m	2011	Guyed Mast	Wolfhagen	Hesse		
Sengenthal RePower 3.2M114 Wind Turbine	656 ft	200 m	2012	Wind turbine on steel tube/ concrete tower	Sengenthal	Bavaria		
Berching Wind Park	656 ft	200 m	2012	Wind turbines on steel tube/ concrete tower (143 m hub height plus rotor)	Berching	Bavaria	49°06′24.94″N 11°28′49.03″E ; 49°05′49.97″N 11°28′56.95″E ; 49°05′50.41″N 11°30′13.19″E ; 49°05′24.8″N 11°29′52.7″E ;49°05′8.51″N 11°29′47.23″E ;49°04′55.87″N 11°29′50.41″E	
Pilsach Wind Park	656 ft	200 m	2012	Wind turbines on steel tube/ concrete tower	Pilsach	Bavaria	49°18′56.05″N 11°32′42.08″E ; 49°17′57.32″N 11°33′23.02″E ; 49°17′56.01″N 11°33′37.7″E	

Various other wind turbines reach at least 200 m tip height (list will not be updated completely as regards more recent wind turbines, see also German Wikipedia article).

== Highest structures by structural type/use ==
=== Towers ===
- Free-standing tower: Berlin TV Tower, Berlin, 368 m
- Concrete tower: Berlin TV Tower, Berlin, 368 m
- Lattice tower: Suspension pylons of Elbe Crossing 2, Stade, 227 m (before 1972: Königs Wusterhausen Central Tower, Königs Wusterhausen, 243 m )
- Electricity pylon: Suspension pylons of Elbe Crossing 2, Stade, 227 m
- Wind turbine: Fuhrländer Wind Turbine Laasow, Laasow, 205 m
- Ride: Scream, Heidepark Soltau, 103 m
- Aerial tramway support pillar: Pillar II of Eibsee Aerial Tramway, Garmisch-Partenkirchen: 85 m
- Lighthouse: Campen Lighthouse, Campen: 65 m
- Test Tower: Rottweil Test Tower, near Rottweil: 246 m
- Wooden Tower: Windkraftanlage Hannover-Marienwerder, near Hannover: 100 m (1933-1945: Mühlacker Radio Tower, Mühlacker: 190 m, 1945-1948: Tegel Radio Tower, Berlin: 165 m, 1948-1983: Ismaning Radio Tower, Ismaning: 163 m), 2002-2012: Rottenbuch Radio Tower, Peiting: 66 m)

=== Chimney ===
- Chimney: Chimney of Buschhaus Power Station, Helmstedt: 308 m (1981-2006: Chimney of Westerholt Power Station, Westerholt: 337 m)
- Cooling Tower: Niederaussem Power Station, Niederaussem: 200 m
- Brick chimney: Halsbrücker Esse, Freiberg im Sachsen, 140 m

=== Buildings ===
- Highrise: Commerzbank Tower, Frankfurt/Main: 300 m
- Industrial building: Block K of Niederaussem Power Station, Niederaussem: 168 m
- Church: Ulm Münster, Ulm: 161 m
- Residential: Colonia-Haus, Cologne: 155 m
- Silo: Schapfen Mill Tower Silo, Ulm: 125 m
- Light advertisement: Bayer Cross Leverkusen, Leverkusen: 118 m
- Wooden Building: Jahrtausendturm, Magdeburg: 60 m
- Brick building:St. Martin's Church, Landshut: 130.6 m

=== Guyed mast ===
- Guyed mast (grounded): Longwave transmitter Donebach, Mudau: 363 m
- Guyed mast (insulated): Masts of DHO38, Saterland: 353 m
- Partially guyed tower: Waldenburg TV Tower: 165 m

=== Bridges and dams ===
At all bridges height of highest pillar is given

- Bridge: Kocher Valley Bridge, Geislingen am Kocher: 178 m
- Railway Bridge: Müngsten Bridge, Solingen: 107 m
- Suspension Bridge: Fleher Bridge, Düsseldorf: 146 m
- Brick Bridge: Göltzsch Viaduct, Vogtland: 78 m
- Dam: Rappbode Dam, Hasselfelde: 106 m

== List of tallest structures of the different states in Germany ==
=== Schleswig-Holstein ===
- FM- and TV-masts Bungsberg, 231 m

Close to the site, there is a telecommunication tower of reinforced concrete, the Telecommunication Tower Bungsberg with an observation deck in a height of 40 m.

=== Free and Hanseatic City of Hamburg ===
- FM- and TV-Mast Hamburg-Billstedt, 300 m

=== Free Hanseatic City of Bremen ===
- Chimney of Unit 6 of Bremen-Hafen Power Station, 250 m

=== Mecklenburg-Western Pomerania ===
- FM and TV-mast Schwerin-Zippendorf, 273 m

Close to it, there is the 136-metre-high (446 ft) TV Tower Schwerin-Zippendorf, a TV tower of reinforced concrete with an observation deck.

=== Berlin ===
- TV Tower Berlin, 368.03 m

=== Brandenburg ===
- New longwave transmission mast Zehlendorf, 359.7 m

=== Lower Saxony ===
- VLF transmission masts Saterland, 352.9 m

=== Saxony-Anhalt ===
- longwave transmission mast Burg, 324 m

=== Free State of Saxony ===
- Chimney of heating power station Chemnitz-Nord, 300 m
- 3 chimneys of Kraftwerk Boxberg (Werk 1 und 2), 300 m

=== Free State of Thuringia ===
- Chimney of Erfurt-Ost Heating Power Station, 226 m (demolished)
- Chimneys of Gera-Nord Heating Power Station, 225 m
- Chimney of Jena Heating Power Station, 225 m

=== North Rhine-Westphalia ===
- Chimney of Power Station Westerholt, 337 m (demolished in 2006)
- FM and TV-mast Wesel, 320.8 m

=== Hesse ===
- Europe Tower (Telecommunication Tower Frankfurt), 337.5 m

=== Rhineland-Palatinate ===
- FM- and TV Mast Scharteberg, 302 m

=== Saarland ===
- FM- and TV Mast Riegelsberg, 287 m

=== Baden-Württemberg ===
- Longwave transmission masts Donebach, 363 m
- Rottweil Test Tower, 246 m

=== Free State of Bavaria ===
- Telecommunication Tower Nuremberg, 292 m

== See also ==
- List of tallest buildings in Germany
