= Koblenz transmitter =

There are multiple transmitters called Koblenz transmitter:

- Koblenz radio transmitter, a historic mediumwave transmitter
- Fernmeldeturm Koblenz
- Transmitter Dieblich-Naßheck, commonly called Koblenz transmitter
