= Behren-Bokel Transmitter =

German transmission tower

Coordinates: 52°47′38″N 10°31′57″E

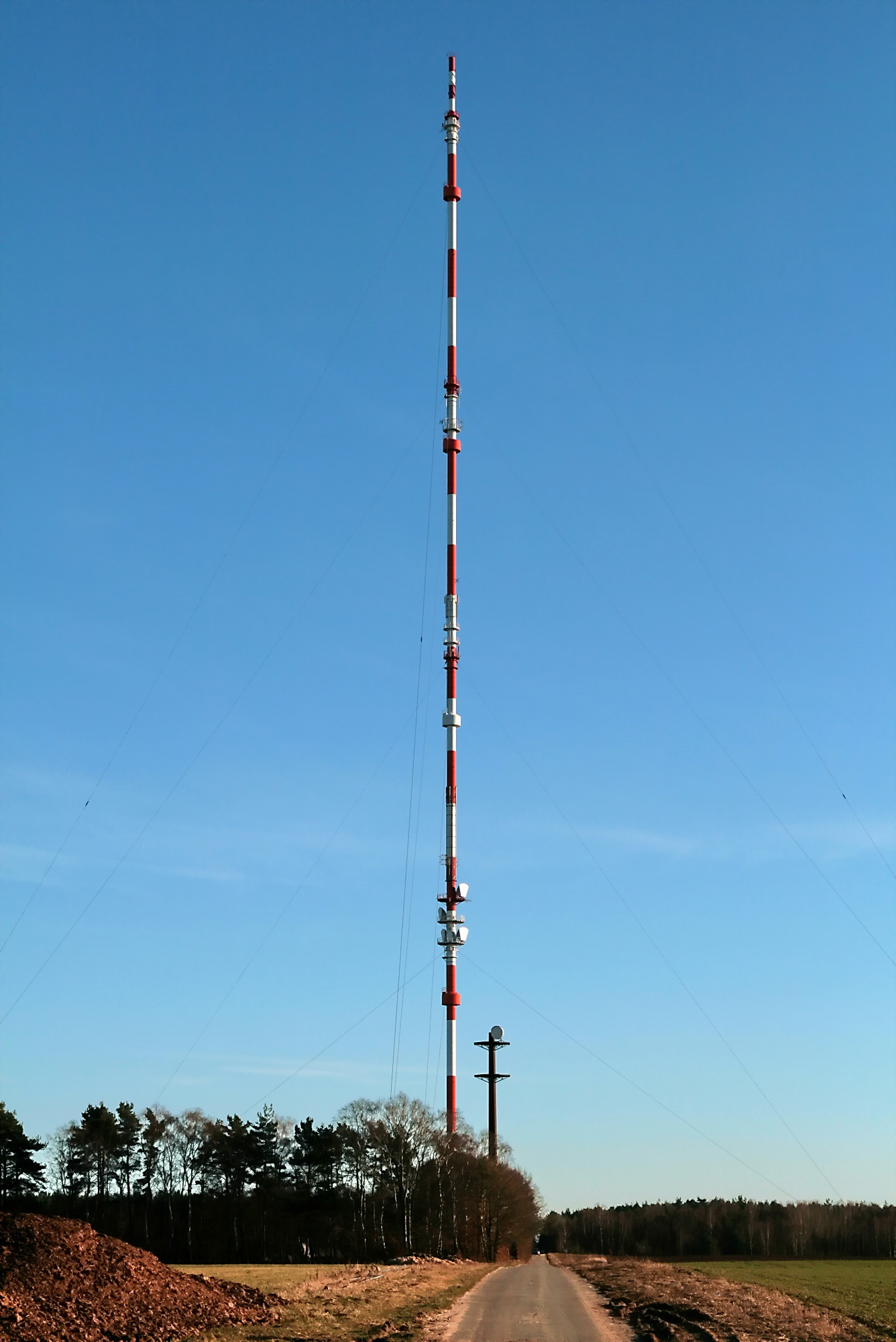
Behren-Bokel Transmitter.

The Behren-Bokel Transmitter, also known as the Sprakensehl Transmitter, is a 323-metre high guyed steel tube radio mast in Behren-Bokel near Uelzen in Lower Saxony, Germany. The mast is used for FM- and TV-broadcasting, and was at its erection time in 1961 the highest construction of West Germany.

== See also ==
- List of tallest structures in Germany
