= Kettrichhof transmitter =

Transmitter station in Germany

Coordinates: 49°8′43.5″N 7°35′13″E

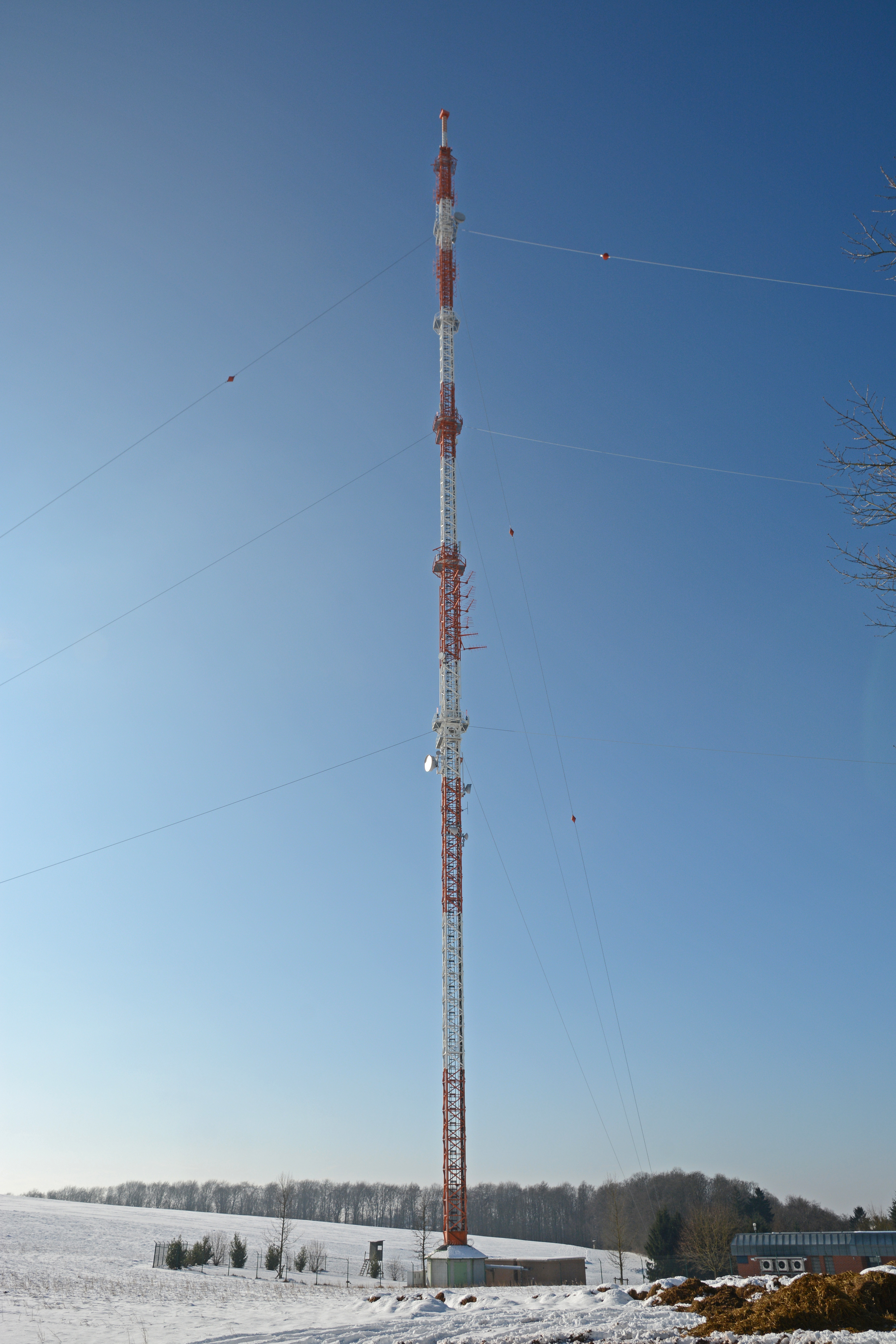
View of the facilities from the access road

Kettrichhof transmitter is a facility for FM- and TV-broadcasting at Kettrichhof, a village which is part of Lemberg, Rhineland-Palatinate, Germany. It is located at an elevation of 436 m (1,430 ft) a.s.l. The antenna support is a guyed mast of latticed steel with a square cross section which was built in 1985 and was originally 210 m (690 ft) tall. When new antennas were added in 2007, the height of the mast was increased to 236 m (774 ft). Reception of its signals is possible in an area spanning from the Eifel to Karlsruhe and Pforzheim and even in elevated locations on the Swabian Alb. On 4 December 2007, the TV transmitter was switched over to DVB-T, and DAB+ transmissions from Kettrichhof started on 9 September 2015.

== See also ==
- List of tallest structures in Germany
