= Wiederau transmitter =

Coordinates: 51°11′08″N 12°16′50″E

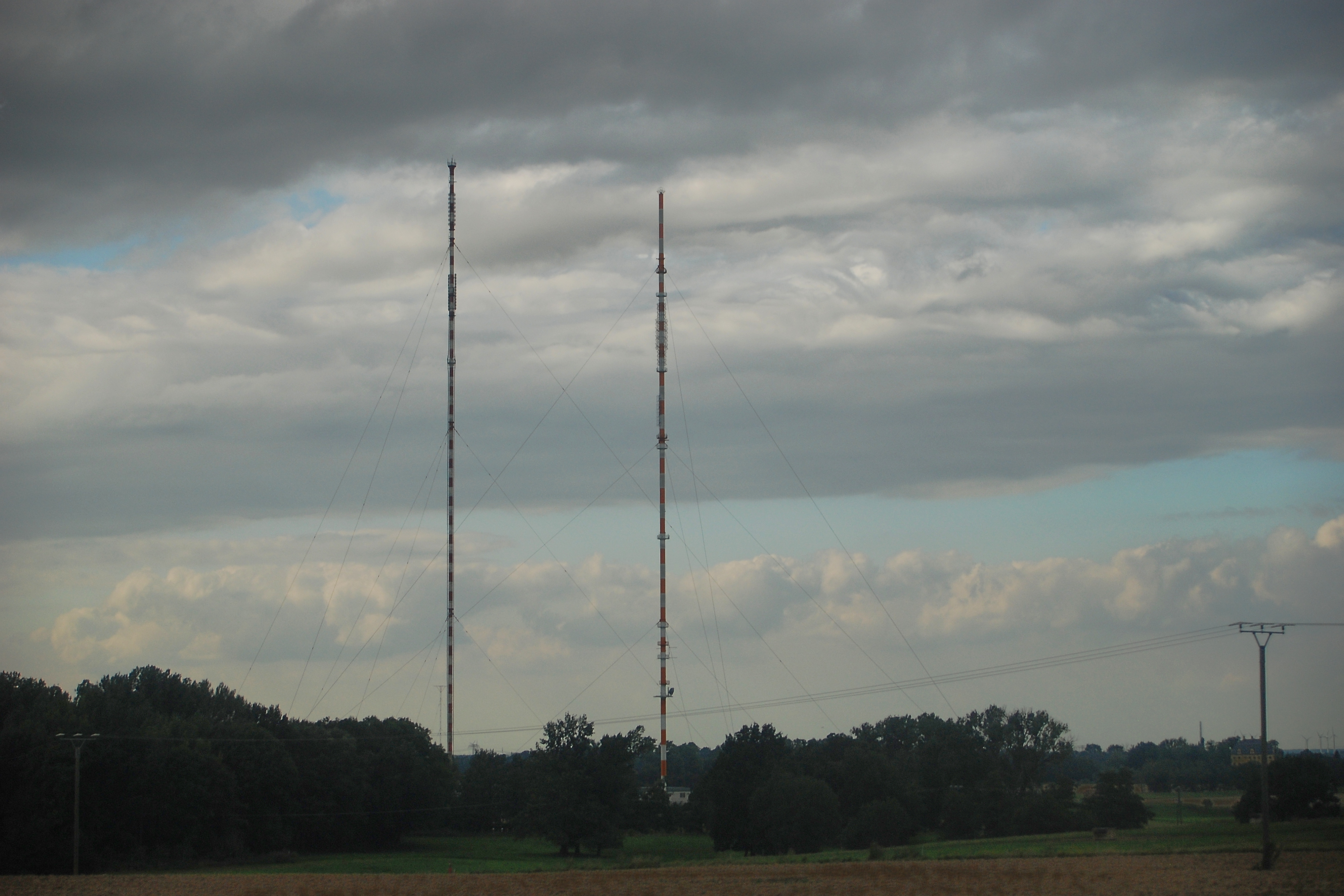
Wiederau transmitter

The Wiederau transmitter is the oldest broadcasting facility in Saxony. It is located near Wiederau, a village which is part of the municipality of Pegau, and is used for medium-wave, FM and Television broadcasting.

Wiederau transmitter went into service on October 28, 1932 as medium-wave transmitter for broadcasting supply of Saxony on 782 kHz. It had a transmission power of 120 kW and used a T-antenna, which was mounted on two 125-metre-tall wooden lattice towers.

In spite of its high transmission power, reception of the Wiederau transmitter was not satisfactory at night times in areas more than 80 kilometres away from Wiederau, because the antenna radiated a great deal of skywave, resulting in fading. Therefore, in 1935 the T-antenna was replaced by a vertical wire antenna, which was hung up in a 150-metre-tall free-standing wooden lattice tower.

In 1939, a second mediumwave transmitter was installed at Wiederau. This transmitter, which is still functional, was designed for fast change of transmission frequency and used as antenna a triangular antenna, which could be used for every frequency in the MF-band. During air raids in World War II this transmitter formed, with other radio stations in Germany, a single-frequency network in order to make it as difficult as possible for allied planes to use it for radio navigation.

In 1943, construction work of a short wave transmitter started, but it could not be completed before the end of World War II. Instead, some transmitters for jamming radio communication between the allied aircraft were installed.

The Wiederau transmitter remained in service until April 12, 1945, when the power supply failed. The transmitter remained silent until September 1945 as the Soviet Military administration allowed it to get into the air again. In 1947, its transmission frequency was changed to 722 kHz. In 1953, the Wiederau transmitter got a new antenna tower in the form of a guyed steel-tube mast radiator insulated from the ground.

The new mast antenna went in service on September 19, 1953. On October 27, 1953, the old wooden tower, which was the tallest wooden structure in East Germany, was demolished by explosives. In December 1953, short wave transmissions started at Wiederau.

In May 1954 the transmitter site was flooded. Although parts of the area were 70 centimetres under water, it was possible to save all equipment from the flooding and transmit without interruption. As consequence of this flood, in 1958 a dam was built around the site. In 1959, the 156-metre mast of the station had an antenna for TV and FM-transmission added on top, increasing its height to 236 metres. During this work, the medium wave program was temporarily transmitted from a triangular antenna installed at the site of the former 150-metre-tall wooden tower.

After completion of the work, the medium-wave transmission frequency was changed from 722 kHz to 575 kHz. While this frequency also had better groundwave propagation, the change also had the goal of making reception of the Mühlacker transmitter working on the same frequency very difficult.

In 1968–1969 a second guyed mast 211 metres high was built at Wiederau in direct proximity to the existing 235-metre-tall mast. This mast is in opposite to the old mast grounded and can therefore only used for FM and TV broadcasting. As result of the Wave plan of Geneva, the Wiederau transmitter had to change its frequency to 531 kHz. This frequency change ended its interference with the Mühlacker transmitter (which was still interfered with significantly by Wöbbelin transmitter), but now interfered with Beromünster transmitter in Switzerland, which also operated on 531 kHz.

Until the inauguration of the new Radio Moscow transmitter at Wachenbrunn in 1989, it also served to transmit Radio Moscow programming. After German reunification, the number of FM transmitters at Wiederau increased, but the short wave transmitter was shut down in 1993 and all shortwave antennas were dismantled. In 1995, the medium wave transmitter moved its frequency from 531 kHz to 783 kHz, which ended its interference with German speaking medium-wave broadcasting stations. In 1998 a fully transistorized medium-wave transmitter was installed at the Wiederau transmitter. During this work one of the triangular antennas was replaced, which is now in use for the medium wave transmissions. The previously mentioned 236-metre-tall mast is only used for FM and TV transmissions today.

== Sources ==
- 100 Jahre Funktechnik in Deutschland, Gerd Klawitter, Verlag für Wissenschaft und Technik, Berlin (Deutschland), 1997; Page 155-162.
