= Eifel Transmitter =

Coordinates: 50.21871°N 6.75063°E

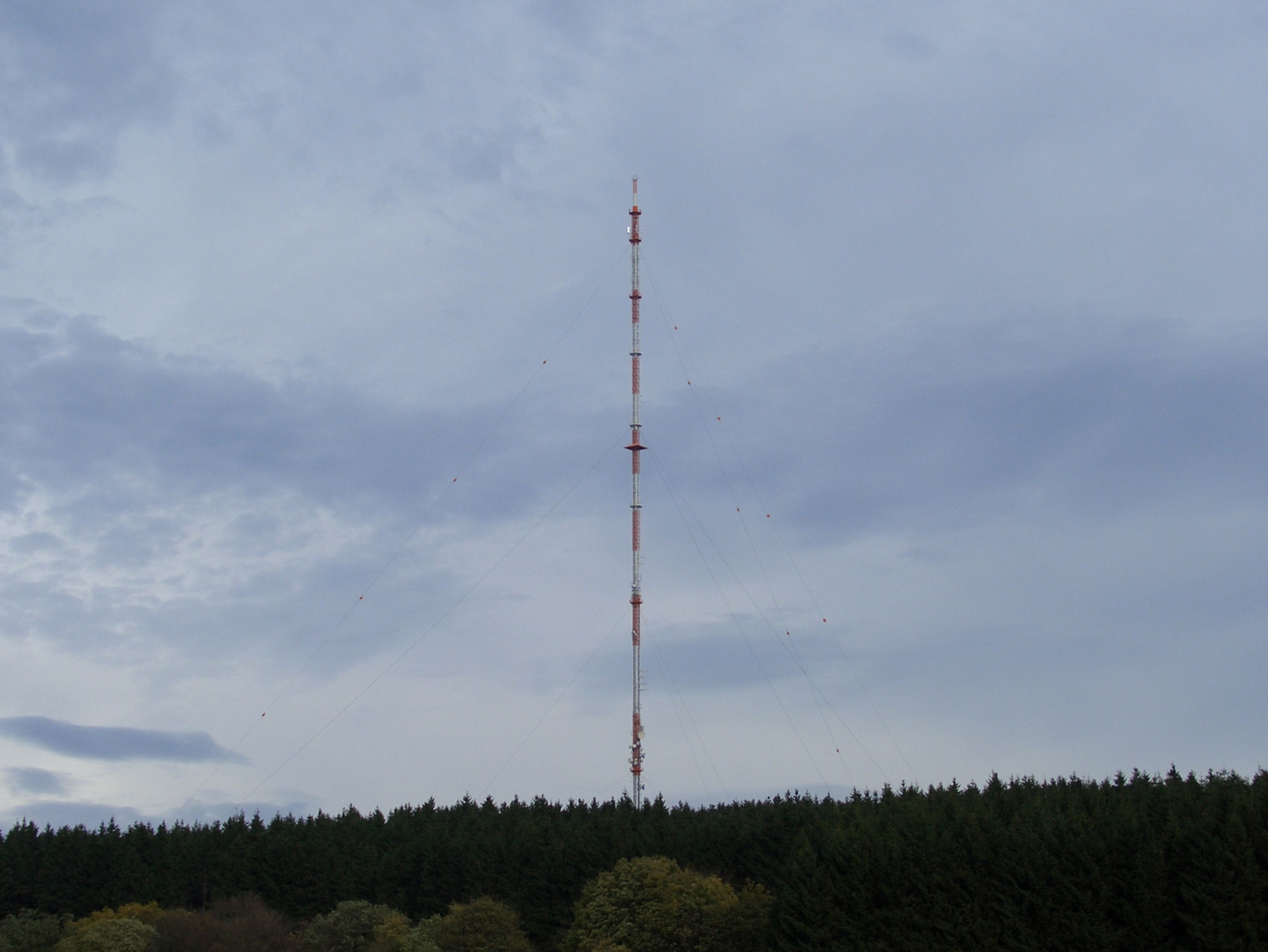
Eifel Transmitter

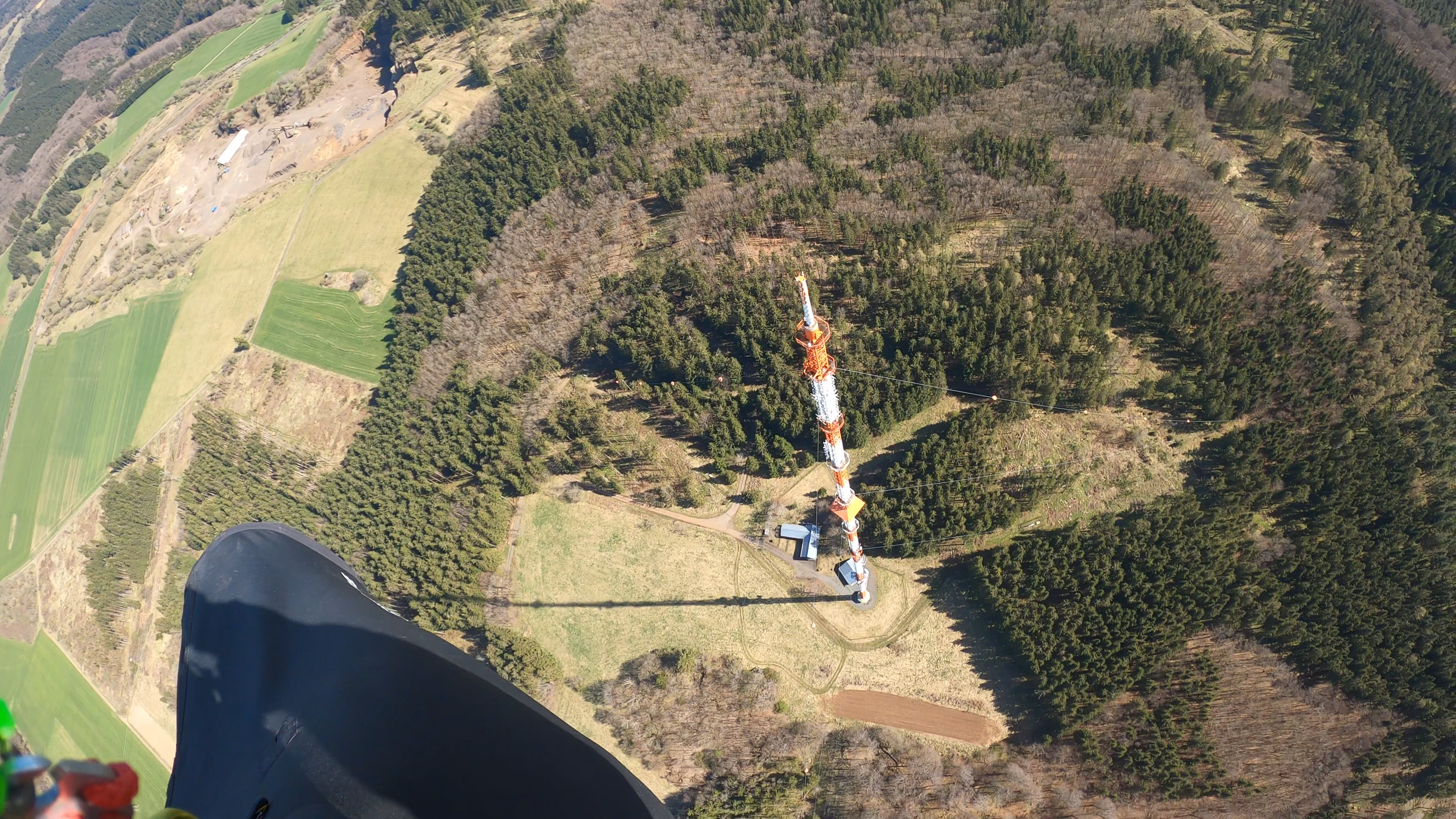
Eifel Transmitter as seen from a paraglider.

The Eifel Transmitter (German: Sender Eifel) is an FM and TV transmission facility for the German broadcasting company of SWR and is located on the Scharteberg near Kirchweiler, Germany. Until 1985, the Scharteberg transmitter used a 160-metre-tall (520 ft) guyed mast. However, this mast did not allow good reception in deep valleys, so in 1985 a new, 302-metre-tall (991 ft), guyed, steel framework mast was built, becoming the tallest structure of Rhineland-Palatinate. The elements of this mast were built by the firm of Hein, Lehmann AG, whilst construction work was carried out by BBS AG, Ludwigshafen. The first 20 metres of the mast were built using a small crane. The mast elements in heights between 20 and 100 metres were mounted by the aid of a car crane, while for the sections above a derrick crane was used. The new mast of Scharteberg transmitter consists of a 288-metre-tall (945 ft), guyed, lattice, steel structure with a square cross section, a side length of 2.1 metres and a 14-metre-long (46 ft) GFK-cylinder on top for the UHF antenna. The total weight of the structure is 204 tons. The mast is guyed at 4 levels, 57, 123, 195 and 273 metres above ground. It is equipped with an elevator which runs up to a height of 281 metres. For aircraft warning 20 red neon lamps and two blinking lights with 1000-watt lamps are installed.

== See also ==
- List of masts
