= Scharteberg =

Mountain in Germany

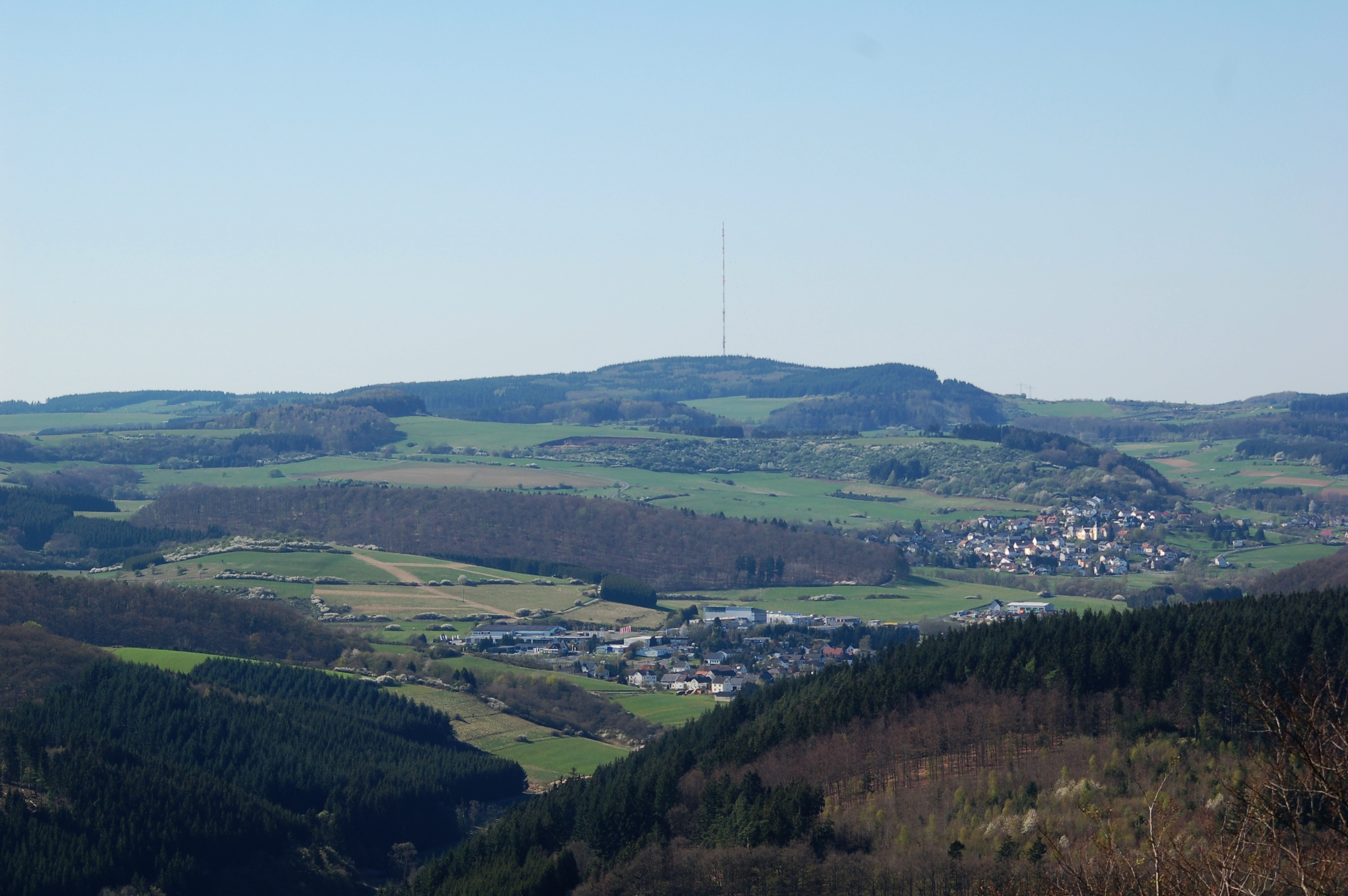
- View of the Scharteberg from the Mäuseberg

Highest point
- Elevation: 691.4 m (2,268 ft)
- Coordinates: 50°13′04″N 6°45′10″E

Geography
- Location within Rhineland-Palatinate
- Location: Rheinland-Pfalz, Germany
- Parent range: Eifel

The Scharteberg is a mountain, 691.4 metres (2,268 ft) high, near Kirchweiler in the district of Vulkaneifel and is one of the highest peaks in the Eifel region of Germany. On the summit is the Eifel Transmitter, which belongs to SWR and is used for FM radio and television.
