= Schwerin TV tower =

Coordinates: 53°35′33″N 11°27′27″E

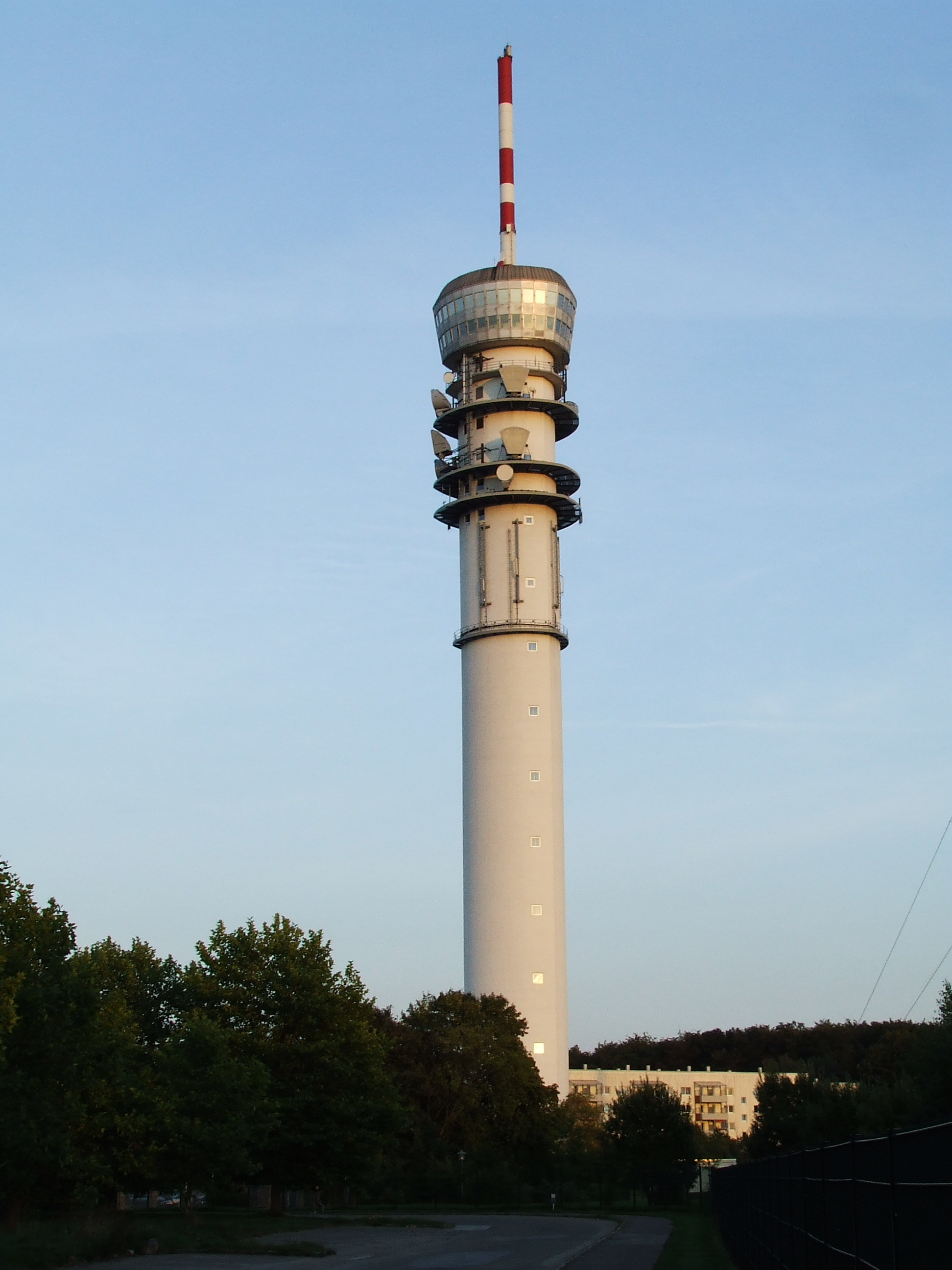
Schweriner Fernsehturm

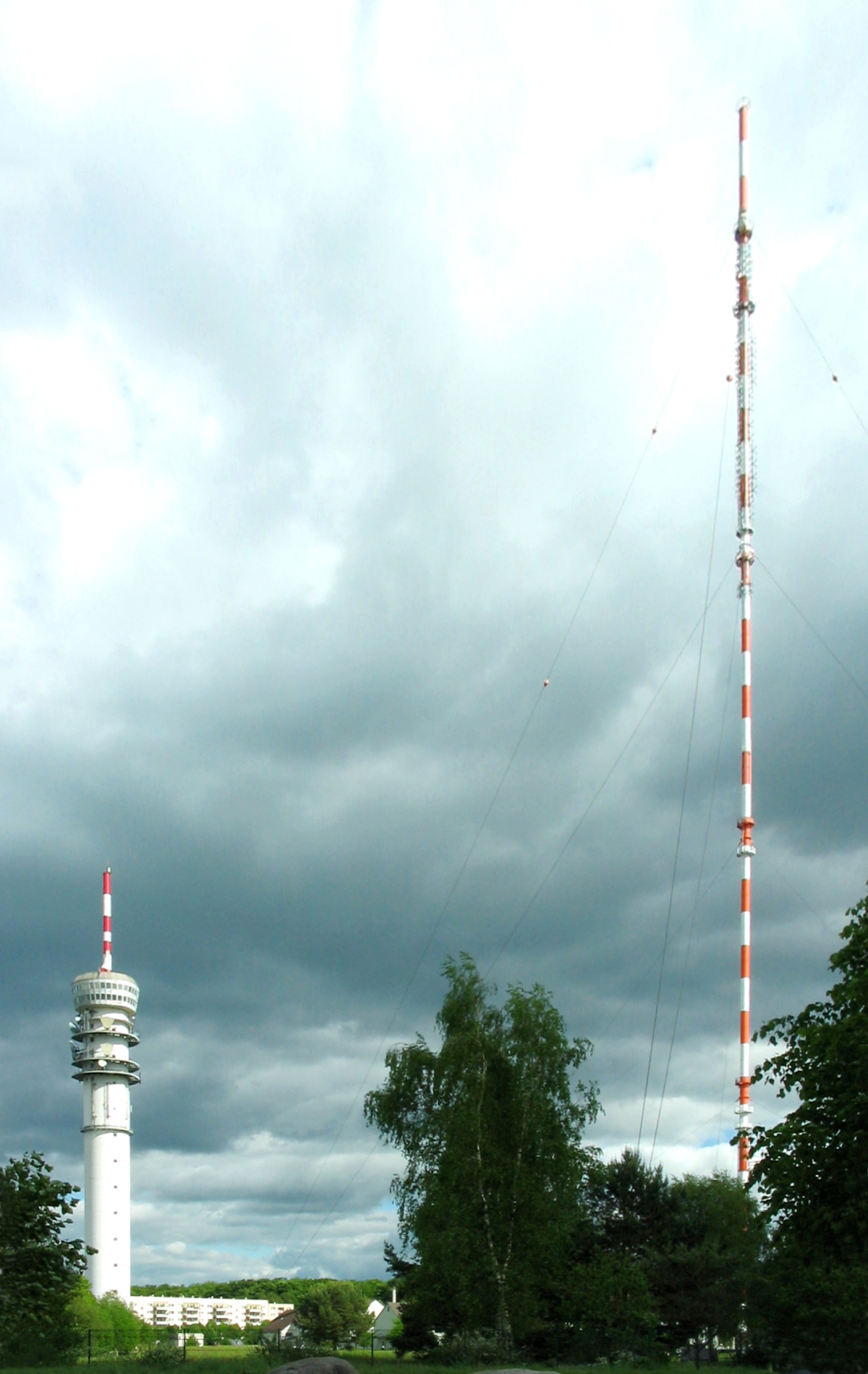
TV tower and radio mast

The Schweriner Fernsehturm is a 136.5-metre-tall communications tower built of steel-concrete between 1960 and 1964 in Schwerin, Germany. Unlike most other TV towers, the ground plan is a spherical triangle and not a cylindric cross section. Also its tower basket, which also contains a restaurant, has no round form, but looks instead like a triangle with round sides. From 1991 to November 28, 1999, the restaurant was closed. In the neighbourhood of this tower at 53°35'30,98" N and 11°27'19,8" E, there is a 273-metre-high, radio mast for FM-radio and TV.
