= Koblenz radio transmitter =

Coordinates: 50°22′36″N 7°35′6″E

Transmitter Koblenz (German: Sender Koblenz) was a medium wave transmitter broadcasting in the Koblenz-Luetzel area. Until 1965, Transmitter Koblenz used a 107-metre-tall (351 ft) wood tower, which was erected between 2 October 1934 and 15 November 1934. This tower had originally been one of the two towers of the transmitter Muehlacker, which was dismantled in 1934 in the course of a change of antenna system.

In 1965 the wood tower had to be dismantled, because the City of Koblenz terminated the lease on the property. As a replacement a 52-metre-tall (171 ft) guyed mast radiator, insulated against ground, was built nearby. On 15 August 1974, transmitter Koblenz was decommissioned. Today, the site is occupied by telecommunication office II of Deutsche Telekom.

== See also ==
List of towers
