= Werdohl-Elverlingsen Power Station =

Coal power plant in Germany

Kraftwerk Werdohl-Elverlingsen
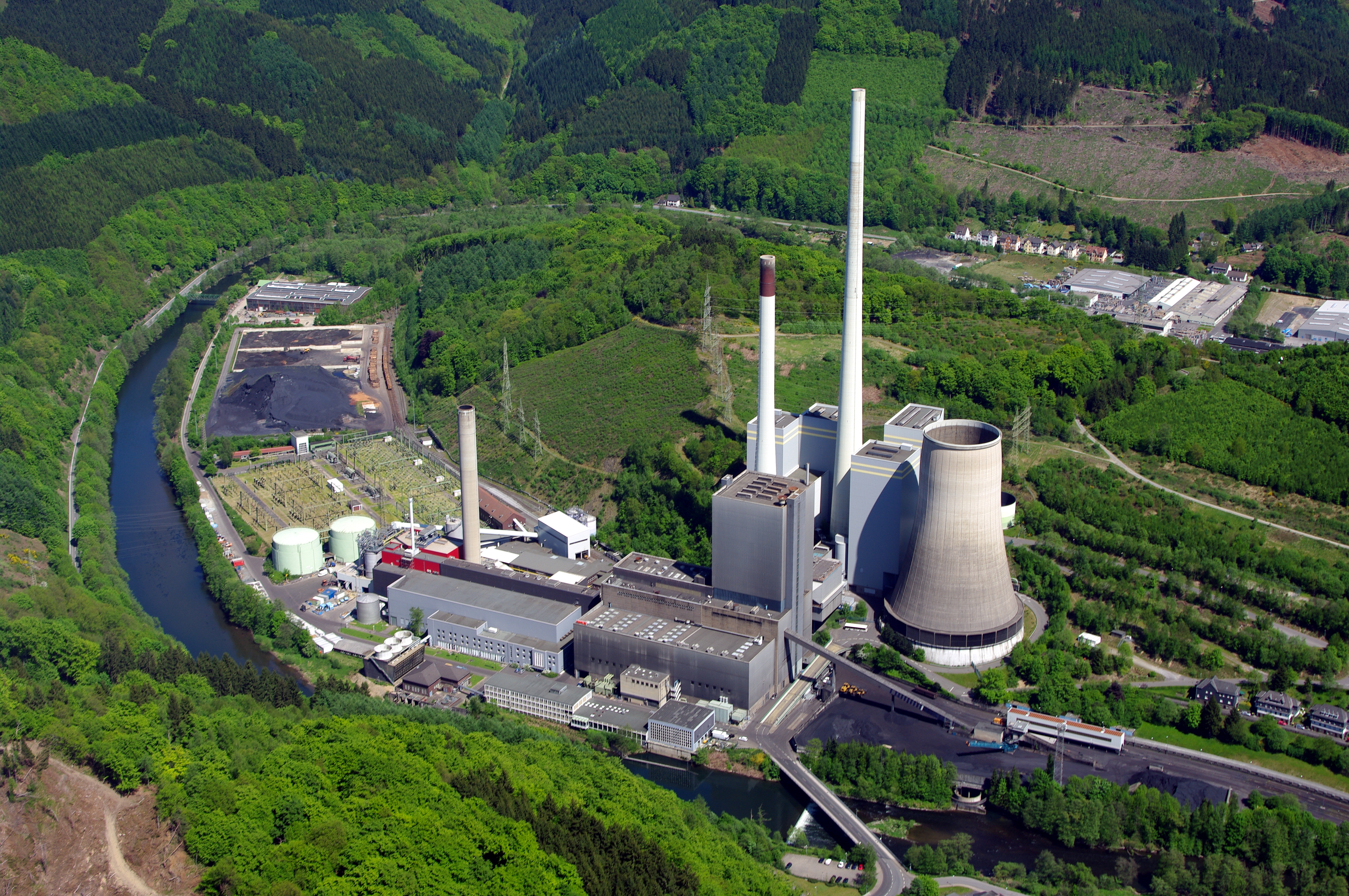
- Kohlekraftwerk Werdohl-Elverlingsen, 2008
- Country: Germany
- Location: NRW, near Werdohl
- Coordinates: 51°16′34.9″N 7°42′20.4″E
- Status: Operational
- Commission date: 1971
- Owner: Mark-E

Thermal power station
- Primary fuel: Coal (Bituminous), Natural Gas, Natural Gas
- Cooling source: Lenne river

Power generation
- Nameplate capacity: 693 MW

External links
- Commons: Related media on Commons

Werdohl-Elverlingsen Power Station is a coal and gas fired power station in the state of North Rhine-Westphalia near Werdohl, Germany on the Lenne river; its water used for cooling.

Since 1912, this power station consumes natural gas and coal to produce it' electricity. Its current owner and operator is Mark-E.
