= Transmitter Riegelsberg =

German radio tower

Coordinates: 49.29129°N 6.92143°E

The Riegelsberg Transmitter (or Schocksberg Transmitter) is a transmitter for FM and TV at Riegelsberg, near Saarbrücken, Germany. The transmitter uses as aerial a 287-metre-high (942 ft) guyed mast.

== See also ==
- List of Masts
