= Peheim transmitter =

Peheim
- Peheim Transmitter (Germany)
- Location: Cloppenburg, Weser-Ems, Niedersachsen, Germany
- Mast height: 220 metres (722 ft)
- Coordinates: 52°53′17″N 7°50′59″E

The Peheim transmitter is a facility used for analog and digital (DAB) FM and in former times TV transmission. It is located northeast of Peheim. The transmitter, which is often incorrectly referred to as the Cloppenburg transmitter, consists of a 220-metre-tall (720 ft) guyed lattice steel mast, which is guyed in four levels. The base of the transmitter is 43 metres (141 ft) above sea level.

IThe transmitter is owned and operated by Deutsche Funkturm (DFMG).

== Analog FM-programmes ==
Transmitter name	Frequency	ERP
N-Joy	93,5 MHz	
Ems-Vechta-Welle	99,3 MHz	
NDR-Info	103,7 MHz	

Furthermore, the FM frequency 99.5 MHz is coordinated for the Peheim transmitter.

The station also broadcasts a number of DAB radio programs in nationwide single-frequency mode.
