= Kiel Transmission Tower =

Coordinates: 54°18′02″N 10°07′06″E

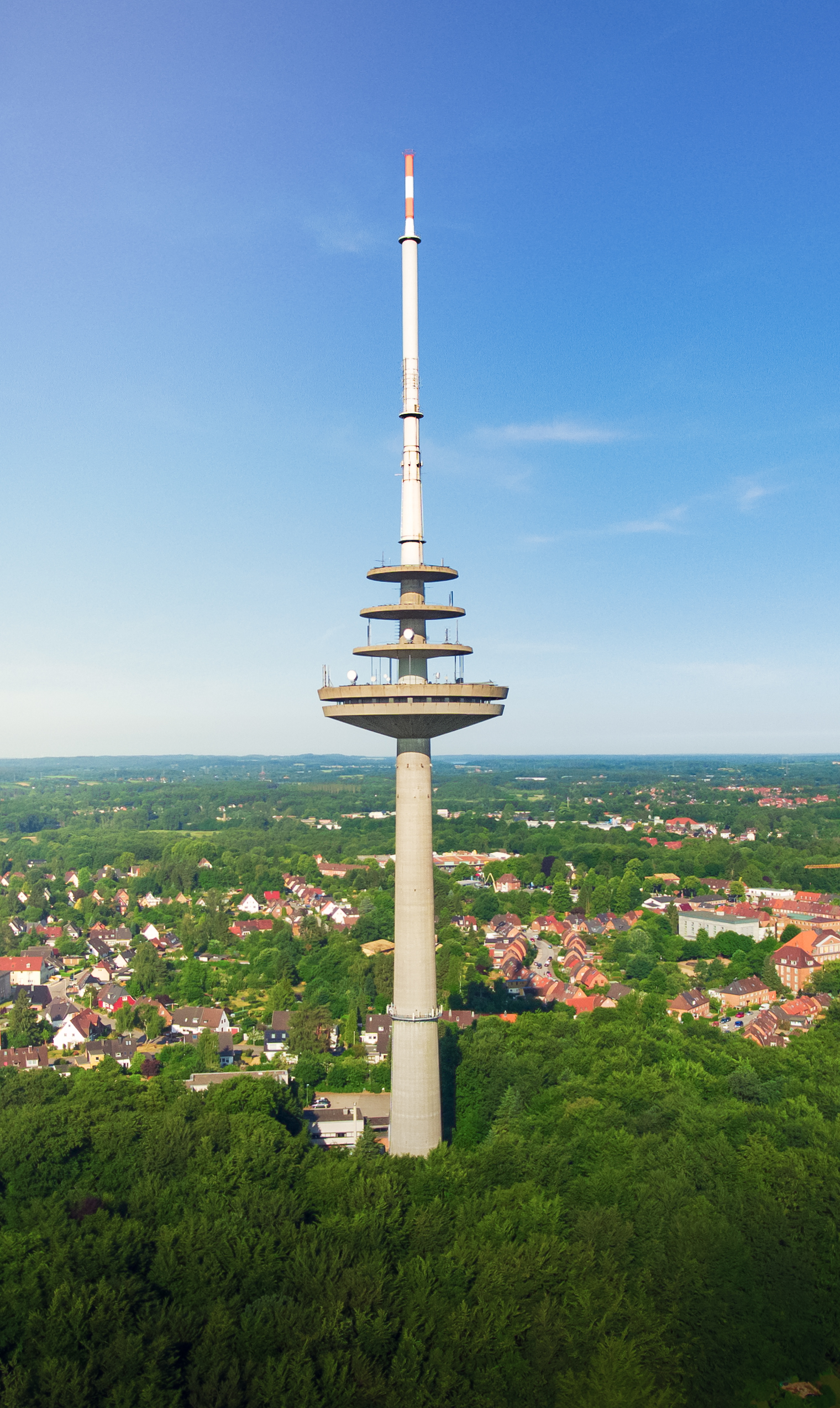
Telecommunication Tower Kiel

The Fernmeldeturm Kiel (Telecommunication Tower Kiel) is a modern landmark of Kiel in Germany, completed in 1975. The 230-metre-high tower, which is used for directional services and TV, VHF and UHF transmission is inaccessible to the public. The basket of this tower, which belongs to German Telekom Inc., has a diameter of 40 metres.

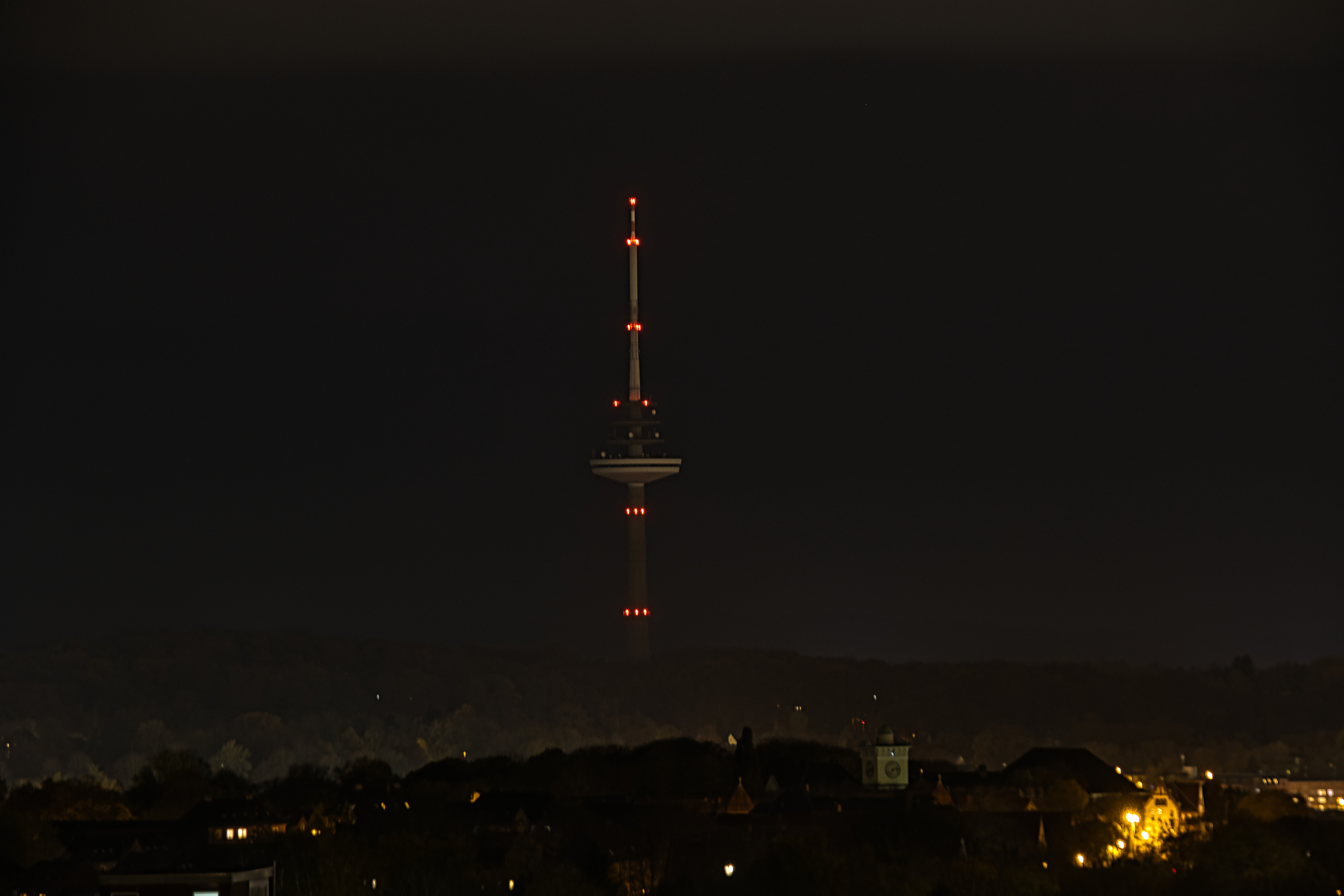
Kiel transmission tower at night

== See also ==
- List of towers
