= Buschhaus Power Station =

Lignite-fired power plant in Lower Saxony, Germany

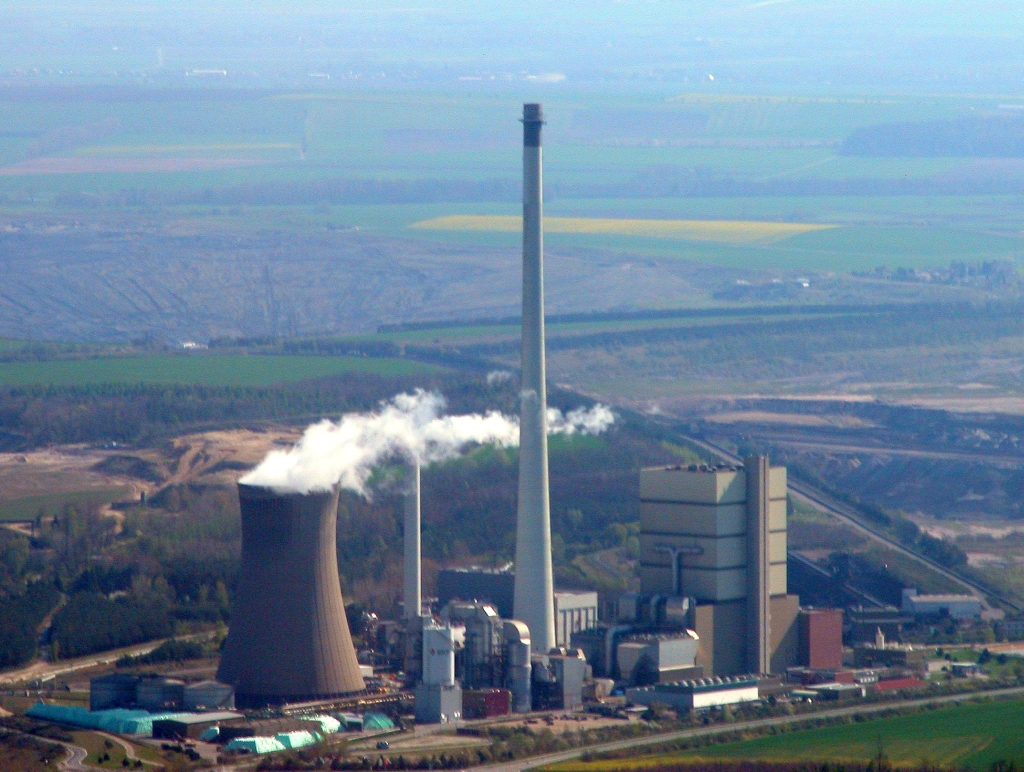
- Country: Germany
- Coordinates: 52°10′17″N 10°58′37″E
- Status: Decommissioned
- Commission date: 1985
- Decommission date: 30 September 2020
- Owner: Helmstedter Revier GmbH (MIBRAG)
- Operators: EEW Energy from Waste; Helmstedter Revier

Thermal power station
- Primary fuel: Lignite

Power generation
- Nameplate capacity: 390 MW

External links
- Commons: Related media on Commons

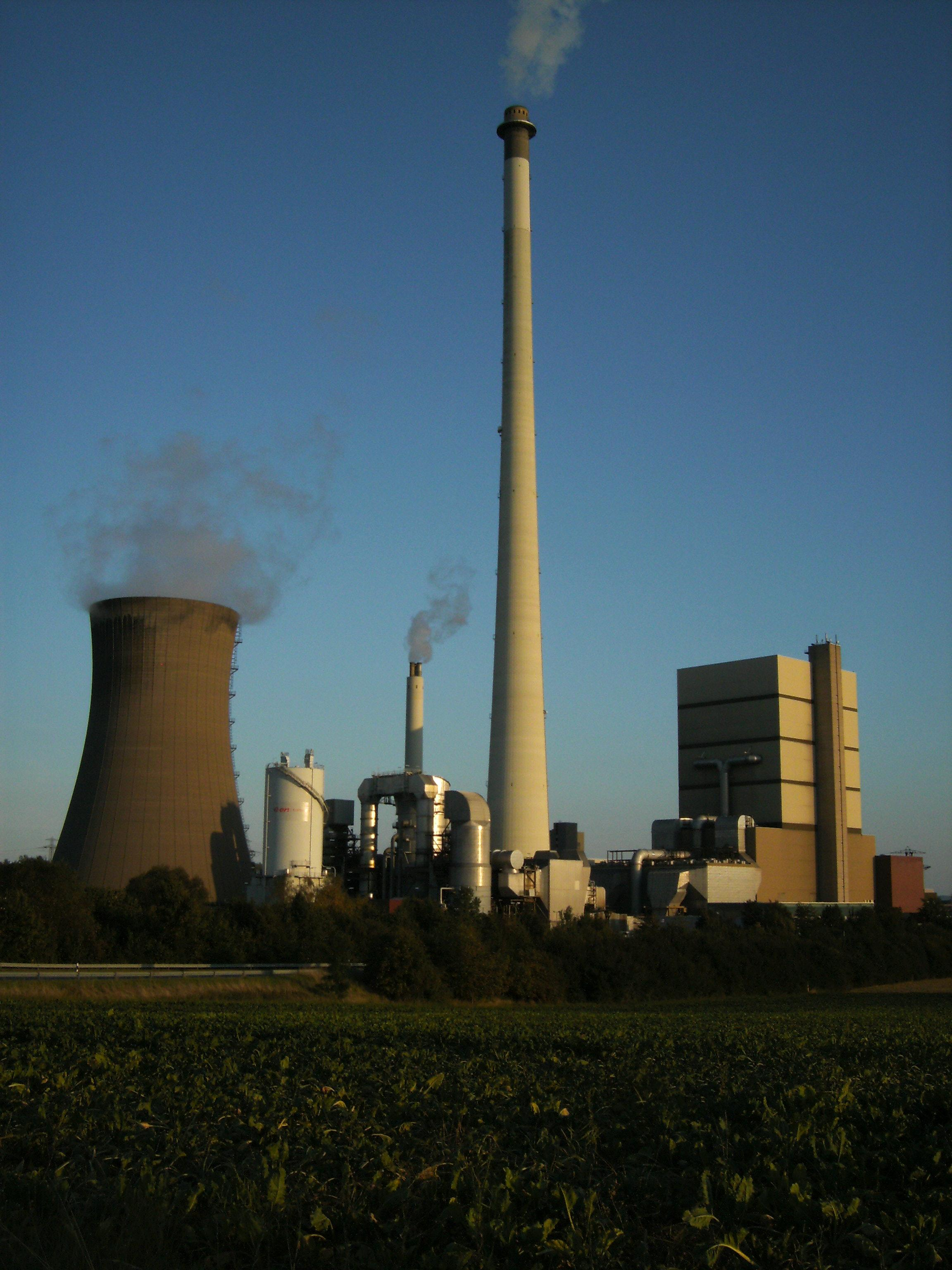
Buschhaus Power Station

Buschhaus Power Station is a lignite-fired power station near Helmstedt in Lower Saxony, Germany. It is operated by Helmstedter Revier GmbH, a subsidiary company of MIBRAG. Until end of 2013, the power station was owned by E.ON.

== History ==
Plans for Buschhaus Power Stations were drawn up at the end of the 1970s, despite the lack of demand for more electricity in West Germany at the time. The new plant created new jobs not only in construction and operation, but also in coal mining.

The station's chimney stands 307 metres (1007 ft, 3 in) tall, making it the tallest in Germany. The power station was modernized in 2002 to increase its efficiency. It has an output capacity of 390 megawatts.

== Shut down ==
In September 2016, the power plant has been shut down. Until 2020, the power station will be kept as cold-reserve. Afterwards, the power plant will be decommissioned.
