= Fernmeldeturm Koblenz =

Coordinates: 50°18′33″N 7°34′07″E

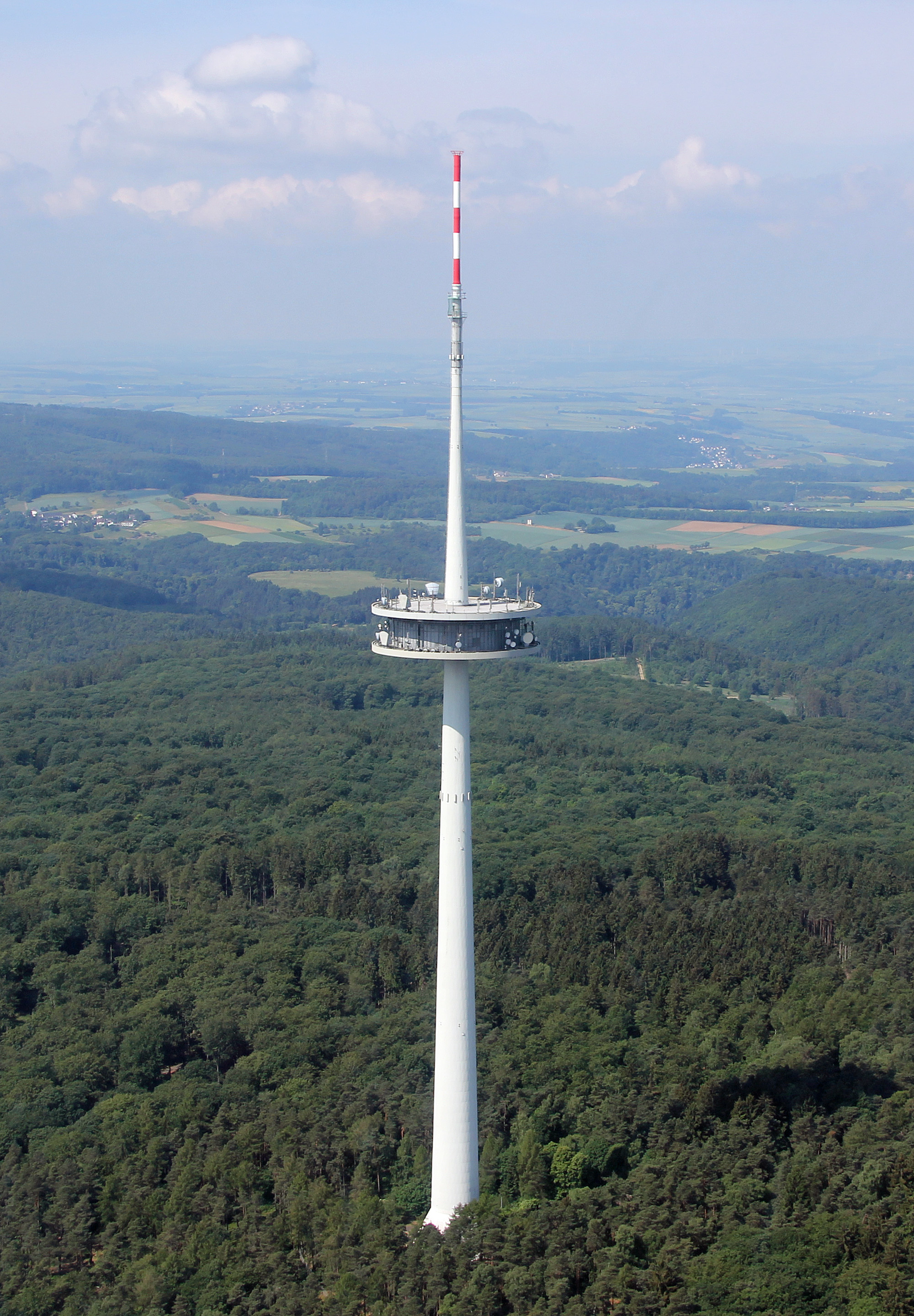
Fernmeldeturm Koblenz

Fernmeldeturm Koblenz is a freestanding telecommunications tower on the mountain Kühkopf near Koblenz, Germany. It was built between 1972 and 1976. The Fernmeldeturm Kühkopf is 260.7 m (855.3 ft) high and not accessible to visitors.

The tower transmits two radio programmes via FM: RPR1. (101.5 MHz) and BigFM (104.0 MHz) at 40 kW each. It also transmits two digital radio (DAB+) multiplexes and six digital television (DVB-T2) multiplexes. The public Südwestrundfunk transmits its programmes for the region from the nearby Dieblich-Naßheck transmitter.

== See also ==
- List of towers
