= Mühlacker radio transmitter =

Radio tower in Germany

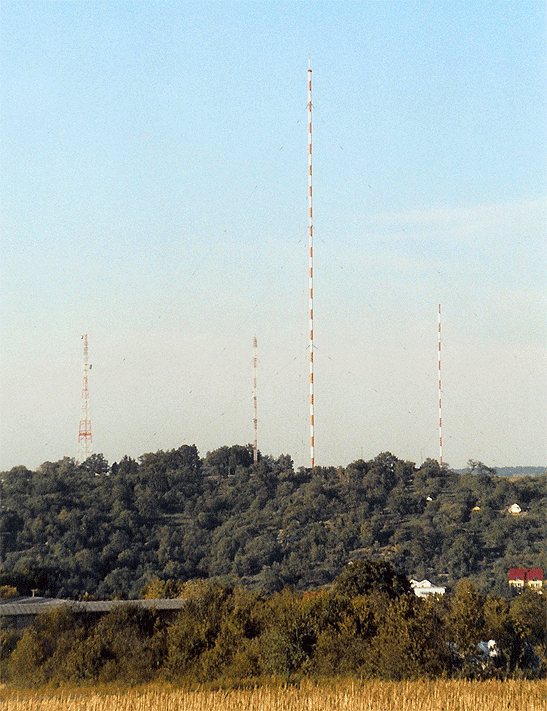
Radio towers of Transmitter Mühlacker in September 2004 (from left to the right): Steel framework tower for directional radio, height: 93 m, built in 2004; reflector mast for medium wave with antennas for mobile phone services, height: 80 m, year of construction 1977; Main transmission mast for medium wave and FM, height: 273 m, built in 1950; reflector mast for medium wave, height: 130 m, built in 1954. Between the main transmission mast and the reflector mast there are the two small grey masts, which can be hardly seen in the picture and which carry the shortwave antenna

The Mühlacker Broadcasting Transmission Facility is a radio transmission facility near Mühlacker, Germany, first put into service on November 21, 1930. It uses two guyed steel tube masts as aerials and one guyed steel framework mast, which are insulated against ground. It has two transmission aerials for shortwave and one free standing steel framework tower for directional radio services. The shortwave transmitter was shut off on October 19, 2004. The medium wave transmitter was switched off in January 2012.

== Description ==
At time of inauguration in 1930 the transmitter, which had a power of 60 kW, used a T-type antenna spun between two 100 m high wooden lattice towers placed 310 m apart. As this antenna produced large amounts of skywave, the area of undistorted fading-free reception - was in spite of its high transmission power - at night not as large as planned and so it was planned to replace this antenna by an aerial with better skywave suppression. So in 1933–34, a 190 m high wooden tower - the tallest structure ever built of wood - was built, in which a vertical wire antenna, which was electrically enlengthened by a metal ring with 10.6 metres diameters on the top of the tower, was hung up. At this time transmission power was also increased from 60 kW to 100 kW. After inauguration of this antenna, the two original wooden towers were dismantled. One of them was rebuilt at Koblenz, the other at Frankfurt-Heiligenstock. In 1939/1940 a second 100 kW transmitter was installed. It used as antenna a system of 3 T-antennas, which were mounted on 3 50 metres tall guyed masts arranged in a triangle. In opposite to the first transmitter, it was including its aerial designed for a quick change of broadcasting frequency, which was done in case of air attacks in order to form a single frequency network with other transmitters, which hindered hostile aircraft using the signals.

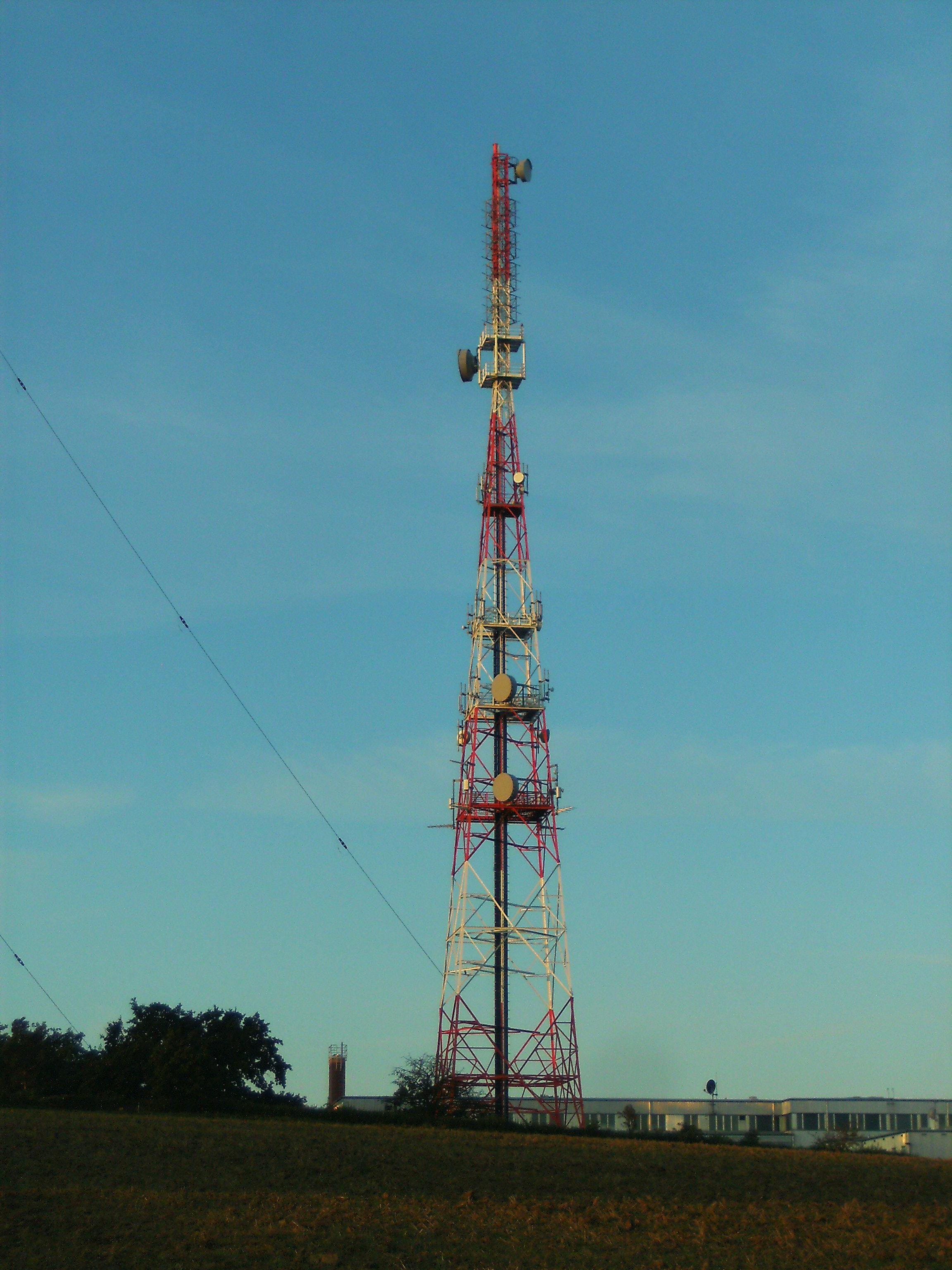
Signalturm

Today, the most important aerial mast in Mühlacker is a 273 m high guyed steel tube mast with a diameter of 1.67 m, located at 48°56′31″N 8°51′14″E. This mast, which was built in 1950, is used as a transmitter for the mediumwave frequency 576 kHz and is therefore insulated against ground. It is designed as an antifading aerial and is therefore double-feedable and insulated. The mast is topped with a butterfly aerial for FM-broadcasting transmitters.

There are flight safety lamps near the ground end of the guy ropes, to make the span of the guy ropes more visible.

Two other radio masts, with heights of 130 m and 80 m, were located at the Mühlacker site.

- The 130 m high mast, situated at 48°56′36″N 8°51′21″E, was a steel tube mast, insulated against ground. Before 1996, it was used as a director during nighttime and a spare during daytime. Transmission power was reduced to 100 kW in 1996 and the mast was obsolete and used only as a spare aerial. It was demolished in 2013.
- The 80 m high radio mast, located at 48°56′29″N 8°51′10″E, is an insulated guyed steel framework mast with a triangular cross section. It was built in 1977 in order to improve transmission towards the south. It was also used to carry aerials for mobile phone services. It has been demolished.

The three masts are arranged in a nearly straight line on the site. A T-type aerial for shortwave transmission is fixed between two small guyed steel framework masts, but was shut down on October 19, 2004. It was later dismantled.

In 1948, a 110 m tall guyed steel framework mast was built on the site at 48°56′33″N 8°51′2″E This served as a transmission aerial for the American Forces Network (AFN) until 1963. From 1963 until its demolition in November 1993, the mast was used as part of a directional aerial for a mediumwave transmitter. It also served as a spare FM transmitter with a butterfly aerial installed on top. The mast was demolished because it was in poor repair and was deemed no longer necessary. Plans for a new mast have not been realized.

Also located here at 48°56′30″N 8°51′5″E was a 50 m steel framework mast insulated against ground. It was part of the directional aerial for the AFN transmitter described above. After 1963, it was only used as an aerial for the internal mobile radio service of the transmission facility. It was demolished in April, 2004 and replaced in the summer of 2004 with a 93 m high freestanding steel framework tower carrying aerials for directional services.

== See also ==
- List of masts
- List of towers
