= List of tallest wooden buildings and structures =

Wooden buildings that have exceptional heights are listed, starting with the tallest wooden structures. Wooden buildings are having a resurgence, as they are considered to be a climate-friendly alternative to some synthetic materials.

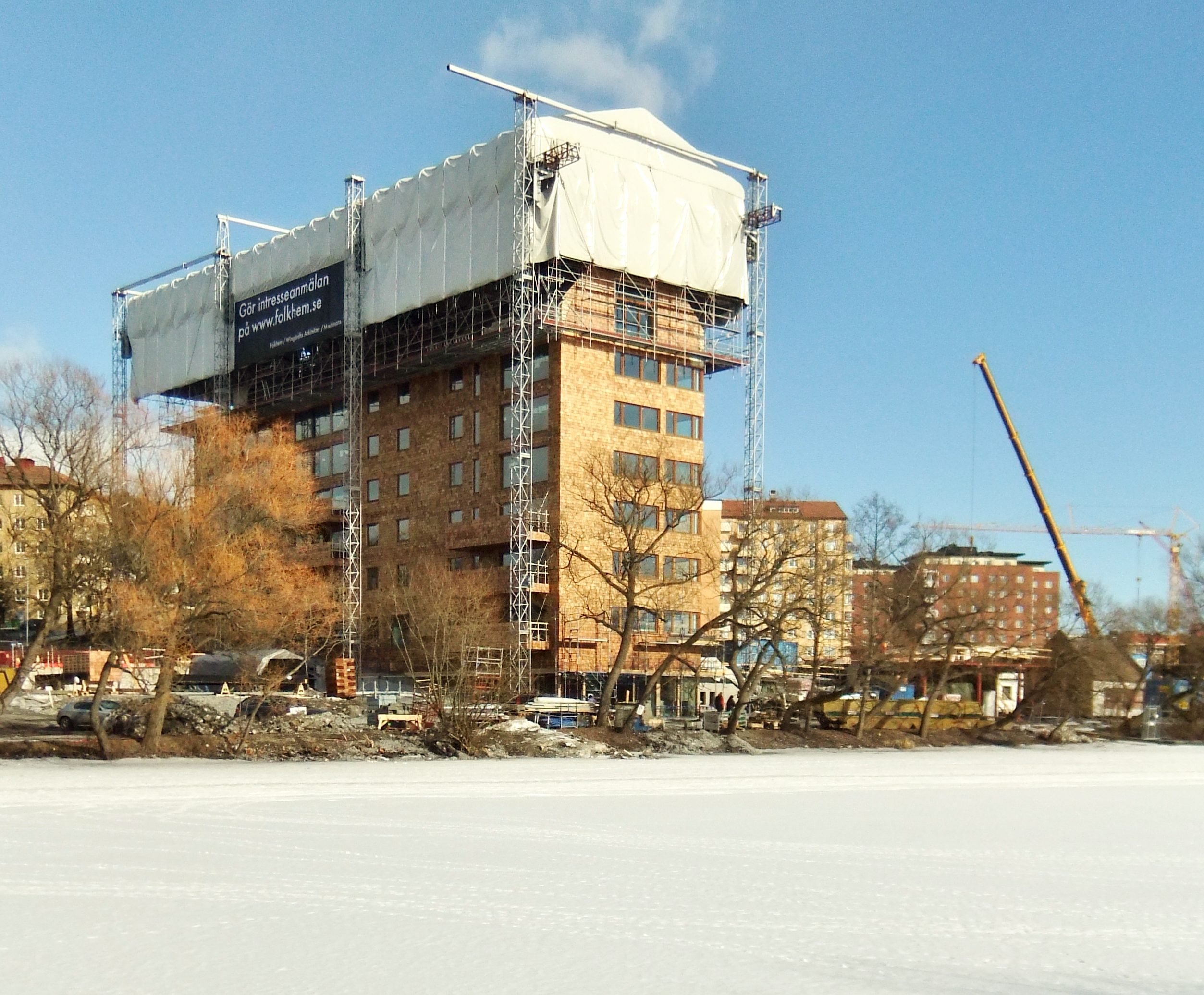
Sweden's tallest wooden (cross-laminated timber) building

In some cases wooden structures were built as not enough steel was available, in others the non-conductive nature of wood was used. The latter was important for towers which carried a radio antenna in their structures and for structures used for measurements on antennas.

The tallest recorded wooden structures had been wooden radio masts with heights of up to 220 meters, or 720 feet, constructed in Russia in the first half of the 20th century but they were replaced by steel masts. Data verifying the location of these structures is not readily available. The second highest recorded wooden structure was the tower of the Mühlacker radio transmitter (190 meters or 620 feet, destroyed in 1945). The tallest standing wooden structure is the Gliwice Radio Tower (112 m or 367 ft), located in Gliwice, Poland.

== Tallest wooden buildings ==
=== Existing structures ===
Structure	Height (m)	Floors	Location	Country	Built	Notes
Gliwice Radio Tower	112	n/a	Gliwice	Poland	1935	The tallest free-standing human-constructed wooden structure in the world (though not a building)
Randsburg Wash Target Test Towers (Buildings 70021 and 70022)	109.73	n/a	Naval Air Weapons Station China Lake	United States	1951	As of February 2023, the second tallest free-standing human-constructed wooden structures in the world
Sanctuary of Truth	105	n/a	Pattaya	Thailand	1981	Decoration in progress
Wind of Change	103.3	n/a	Skara	Sweden	2023	Wind turbine tower made from curved LVL Modvion project page
Hannover-Marienwerder Wind Turbine	100	n/a	Hannover, Lower Saxony	Germany	2012	Vensys77 wind turbine with rotor diameter of 77 metres on wooden tower, total height up to rotor blade tip in 12 o'clock position: 138.5 meters
Pyramidenkogel Tower	100	6	Maria Wörth	Austria	2013	The world's tallest wooden observation tower (made of wood and steel)
Ascent	86.56	25	Milwaukee	United States	2022	Topped off; tallest mass timber building in the world
Mjøstårnet	85.4	18	Brumunddal	Norway	2019	
HoHo Wien	84	24	Vienna	Austria	2019	
Săpânţa-Peri Church	75	2	Săpânța	Romania	2013	
HAUT	73	22	Amsterdam	Netherlands	2021	
Sara Kulturhus Centre	72.8	20	Skellefteå	Sweden	2019	Inaugurated 8 September 2021.
Yongding Pagoda (永定塔)	69.7	8	Beijing	China	2012	
Feldberg telecommunication tower	69.13	19	Schmitten im Taunus, Hesse	Germany	1950	30.28 meters tall timber construction with 9 floors on a 17.65 metres tall steel structure with 5 floors, which stands on a 21.2 metres tall concrete basement with 5 floors
Pagoda of Fogong Temple	67.31	5-6	Yingxian	China	1056	
Bahnorama	66.7	n/a	Vienna	Austria	2010	
Roots	65	18	Hamburg	Germany	2024	Tallest residential timber building in Germany
36-52 Wellington Street	63	15	Melbourne	Australia	2023	Concrete-timber composite
Steel Vengeance	62.5	n/a	Sandusky	Ohio	2018	Hybrid Roller Coaster
Jahrtausendturm	60	6	Magdeburg, Saxony-Anhalt	Germany	1999	
Ieud Monastery	60		Ieud (Romanian: Ieud)	Romania	2003	
Arbo	60		Risch-Rotkreuz	Switzerland	2019	
Hangar 2 of Marine Corps Air Station Tustin	59		Tustin, California	United States	1942	Former airship hangar
Hangar B of Naval Air Station Tillamook	59		Tillamook, Oregon	United States	1942	Former airship hangar
Hangar 2 of Moffett Federal Airfield	58		Santa Clara County, California	United States	1942	Former airship hangar
Rozavlea-Șesu Mănăstirii	58	2	Rozavlea	Romania	2017	
Église Sainte-Marie	57.6	n/a	Church Point, Nova Scotia	Canada	1905	Tallest wooden church in North America
Bârsana Monastery	57	2	Bârsana	Romania	2005	
Tour Hypérion	57	17	Bordeaux	France	2021	The first residential wooden tower in France
Ascension Cathedral	56		Almaty	Kazhakstan	1907	
Hangar 5 & 6 of Lakehurst Maxfield Field	56		Jackson Township, New Jersey	United States	1942	2 former airship hangars
T Express	56		Everland, Yongin	South Korea	2009	Wooden roller coaster
Wildfire	56		Kolmården Wildlife Park, Norrköping	Sweden	2016	Wooden roller coaster
Eunoia Junior College	56	12	Singapore	Singapore	2019	
Pole 1 of Cypress Wind Project Substation Tap	55.5		Dunmore, Alberta	Canada	2022	Wooden pole
El Toro	55		Six Flags Great Adventure, Jackson Township, New Jersey	United States	2006	Wooden roller coaster
Church of the Archangels Michael and Gabriel	54		Șurdești	Romania	1766	
Tower II of Brück antenna test facility	54	n/a	Brück, Brandenburg	Germany	1963	Used for antenna measurements
Tower III of Brück antenna test facility	54	n/a	Brück, Brandenburg	Germany	1963	Used for antenna measurements
Brock Commons Tallwood House	53	18	The University of British Columbia, Vancouver	Canada	2017	
Treet	52.8	14	Bergen	Norway	2015	
Bohdanka lookout tower	52.2	n/a	Bohdaneč	Czech	2011	Closed 2022, structure damaged by wood decay; the highest tower made of timber logs (not CLT) in Europe
Torre de Herveo	52	n/a	Manizales	Columbia	1922	Former tower of a ropeway, today a monument
The House of the Five Senses	52	n/a	Efteling, Kaatsheuvel	The Netherlands	1996	Holds the record of the largest reed roof in the world.
25 King Street	52		Brisbane	Australia	2018	
Colossos - Kampf der Giganten	50		Heide Park, Soltau	Germany	2001	Wooden roller coaster
Goliath	50		Six Flags Great America, Gurnee, Illinois	United States	2014	Wooden roller coaster
Claremont Hotel & Spa	49	10	Claremont, Oakland/Berkeley, California	United States	1906	The main 10-floors building is 36.6 m (120 ft) high, the central tower is 49 m (160 ft) high.
Python in Bamboo Forest	48.8		Nanchang Sunac Land, Nanchang, Jiangxi	China	2016	Wooden roller coaster
Great Buddha Hall, Tōdai-ji	48.6		Nara	Japan	1709	Largest wooden building in the world until 1998, when Odate Jukai Dome was completed
Proud Kanda Surugadai		14	Ochanomizu district, Tokyo	Japan	2021	
The Voyage	48		Holiday World & Splashin' Safari, Santa Claus, Indiana	United States	2006	Wooden roller coaster
Light House	48	14	Joensuu	Finland	2019	
Return to Form		12	Denver	United States		
Royal Park Canvas Hotel		11	Sapporo, Hokkaido	Japan	2022	
Church of the Ascension	45		Piyala	Russia	1654	The tallest survived wooden church in Russia
Wood Coaster	45		OCT East, Yantian, Shenzhen	China	2011	Wooden roller coaster
Obayashi	44	11	Yokohama	Japan	2022	
Baumturm	44	n/a	Neuschönau, Bavaria	Germany	2009	
Cathedral-Basilica of St.Peter and Paul	44	2	Paramaribo	Suriname	1885	Largest wooden building in the western hemisphere
St. George's Cathedral	43.5		Georgetown	Guyana	1892	
Goethe Tower	43	n/a	Frankfurt am Main, Hesse	Germany	1931	Observation tower, destroyed in 2017 by fire, rebuilt 2019-2020
Tower Of Memory	43	n/a	Dil mountain, Lvivska Oblast	Ukraine	2017	Memorial belltower to 1943 battle between UPA and Nazis, tallest wooden tower in Ukraine
Jupiter	42		Kijima Kogen, Beppu, Ōita Prefecture	Japan	1992	Wooden roller coaster
Hades 360	41		Mt. Olympus Water & Theme Park, Wisconsin Dells, Wisconsin	United States	2006	Wooden roller coaster
Telecommunication Tower of Remote Radar Head Benbecula	40.2		Balivanich	United Kingdom		Tower consists of a 20.2 metres tall steel section on the ground and a 20 metres tall wooden section on the top
Telecommunication Tower of Remote Radar Head Neatishead	40.2		Neatishead	United Kingdom		Tower consists of a 22.2 metres tall steel section on the ground and a 18 metres tall wooden section on the top
Wodan Timbur Coaster	40		Europa-Park, Rust, Baden-Württemberg	Germany	2012	Wooden roller coaster
Érd Cellphone Transmission Tower	40	n/a	Érd	Hungary	2015	
Brugherio Cellphone Transmission Tower	40	n/a	Brugherio	Italy	2021	
Podcrkavlje Cellphone Transmission Tower	40	n/a	Podcrkavlje	Croatia	2023	
Gradići Cellphone Transmission Tower	40	n/a	Velika Gorica	Croatia	2024	
Surány One Cellphone Transmission Tower	40	n/a	Pócsmegyer	Hungary		
Ácsteszér Cellphone Transmission Tower 1	40	n/a	Ácsteszér	Hungary		
Le Monstre	39.9		La Ronde, Montreal, Quebec	Canada	1985	Wooden roller coaster
American Eagle	38.7		Six Flags Great America, Gurnee, Illinois	United States	1981	Wooden roller coaster
Sensations	38	8, 11	Strasbourg	France	2019	
Shivering Timbers	37.2		Michigan's Adventure, Muskegon County, Michigan	United States	1998	Wooden roller coaster
Church of the Transfiguration	37		Kizhi	Russia	1708	
The Boss	37		Six Flags St. Louis, Eureca, Missouri	United States	2000	Wooden roller coaster
Regina II	37		Tobu Zoo Park, Minami, Saitama	Japan	2000	Wooden roller coaster
Rampage	36.6		Alabama Adventure and Splash Adventure, Bessemer, Alabama	United States	1998	Wooden roller coaster
GhostRider	36		Knott's Berry Farm, Buena Park, California	United States	1998	Wooden roller coaster
Anaconda	36		Walygator Grand Est, Maizières-les-Metz	France	1989	Wooden roller coaster
Balder	36		Liseberg, Gothenburg	Sweden	2003	Wooden roller coaster
Intro Cleveland	35	9	Cleveland, Ohio	United States	2022	
Hala Madrid	34.4		Real Madrid World, Dubai	United Arab Emirates	2024	Wooden roller coaster
Fjord Flying Dragon	34		Happy Valley, Dongli, Tianjin	China	2013	Wooden roller coaster
Boulder Dash	34		Lake Compounce, Bristol, Connecticut	United States	2000	Wooden roller coaster
SKAIO	34	10	Heilbronn, Baden-Württemberg	Germany	2019	
Jungle Trailblazer	34		Fantawild Dreamland, Shifeng, Zhuzhou, Hunan	China	2016	Wooden roller coaster
The Beast	33.5		Kings Island, Mason, Ohio	United States	1979	Wooden roller coaster
Great White	33.5		Morey's Piers, Wildwood, New Jersey	United States	1996	Wooden roller coaster
Hell Cat	33.5		Clementon Park, Clementon, New Jersey	United States	2004	Wooden roller coaster, unused since 2023
Jungle Trailblazer	33.4		Oriental Heritage, Jiujiang, Wuhu, Anhui	China	2015	Wooden roller coaster
Mystic Timbers	33.3		Kings Island, Mason, Ohio	United States	2017	Wooden roller coaster
Wooden Coaster - Fireball	33		Happy Valley, Songjiang, Shanghai	China	2009	Wooden roller coaster
Jungle Trailblazer	33		Fantawild Asian Legend, Qingxiu, Nanning, Guangxi	China	2018	Wooden roller coaster
Gold Striker	33		California's Great America, Santa Clara, California	United States	2013	Wooden roller coaster
Jungle Trailblazer	33		Fantawild Dreamland, Zhongmu, Zhengzhou, Henan	China	2015	Wooden roller coaster
Jungle Trailblazer	32.8		Oriental Heritage, Tong'an, Xiamen, Fujian	China	2017	Wooden roller coaster
Outlaw Run	32.6		Silver Dollar City, Stone County, Missouri	United States	2013	Wooden roller coaster
Roaring Timbers	32.4		Sun World Hon Thom Nature Park, Phú Quốc, Kiên Giang	Vietnam	2022	Wooden roller coaster
Jungle Trailblazer	32.3		Oriental Heritage, Huaiyin, Jinan, Shandong	China	2015	Wooden roller coaster
Jungle Trailblazer	32.3		Oriental Heritage, Cixi, Ningbo, Zhejiang	China	2016	Wooden roller coaster
Great American Scream Machine	32		Six Flags Over Georgia, Austell, Georgia	United States	1973	Wooden roller coaster
Dauling Dragon	32		Happy Valley, Hongshan, Wuhan, Hubei	China	2012	Wooden roller coaster
Forté	32	10	Melbourne	Australia	2012	
The Cú Chulainn Coaster	32		Emerald Park, Kilbrew, County Meath	Ireland	2015	Wooden roller coaster
Leviathan	32		Sea World, Surfers Paradise, Queensland	Australia	2022	Wooden roller coaster
Troy	31.9		Attractiepark Toverland, Sevenum	Netherlands	2007	Wooden roller coaster
Time Travel	31.5		Hot Go Park - Happy Jungle World, Fushun, Liaoning	China	2014	Wooden roller coaster
Prowler	31.2		Worlds of Fun, Kansas City, Missouri	United States	2009	Wooden roller coaster
Tower 17 + Tower 18 of powerline Chancenay-Cousancelles	31		Ancerville	France	1994	2 electricity pylons of "Corolle"-type
Twister	31		Knoebels Amusement Resort, Elysburg, Pennsylvania	United States	1999	Wooden roller coaster
Murray Grove		9	Hackney, London	United Kingdom	2009	
Thunderhead	30.6		Dollywood, Pigeon Forge, Tennessee	United States	2004	Wooden roller coaster
Timber Wolf	30.5		Worlds of Fun, Kansas City, Missouri	United States	1989	Wooden roller coaster
Twister III: Storm Chaser	30.5		Elitch Gardens, Denver, Colorado	United States	1995	Wooden roller coaster
Viper	30.5		Six Flags Great America, Gurnee, Illinois	United States	1995	Wooden roller coaster
Excalibur	30.5		Funtown Splashtown U.S.A., Saco, Maine	United States	1998	Wooden roller coaster
Tóthfalu One Cellphone Transmission Tower	30.5	n/a	Tahitótfalu	Hungary		
Great Desert-Rally	30.5		Happy Valley, Jinniu, Chengdu, Sichuan	China	2017	Wooden roller coaster
Legend	30.2		Holiday World & Splashin' Safari, Santa Claus, Indiana	United States	2000	Wooden roller coaster
Mammut	30		Tripsdrill, Cleebronn, Baden-Württemberg	Germany	2008	Wooden roller coaster
Békés Cellphone Transmission Tower	30	n/a	Békés	Hungary	2010	
Chalmers Wind Turbine	30	n/a	Bohus-Björkö	Sweden	2020	Modvion Project page
Bechtolsheim Cellphone Transmission Tower	30	n/a	Bechtolsheim, Rhineland-Palatinate	Germany	2023	
Patch22	30	7	Amsterdam	Netherlands	2015	
Perspective	30	6	Bordeaux	France	2018	
Tonnerre de Zeus	29.9		Parc Astérix, Plailly	France	1997	Wooden roller coaster
Wild One	29.9		Six Flags America, Upper Marlboro, Maryland	United States	1986	Wooden roller coaster
Renegade	29.7		Valleyfair!, Shakopee, Minnesota	United States	2007	Wooden roller coaster
International House Sydney	29.7	7	Sydney	Australia	2017	
Daramu House	29.7	7	Sydney	Australia	2019	
WIDC	29.5	8	Prince George, British Columbia	Canada	2014	
Kentucky Rumbler	29.3		Beech Bend, Bowling Green, Kentucky	United States	2006	Wooden roller coaster
Boardwalk Bullet	29.3		Kemah Boardwalk, Kemah, Texas	United States	2007	Wooden roller coaster
Texas Singray	29.3		SeaWorld San Antonio, San Antonio, Texas	United States	2020	Wooden roller coaster
Predator	29		Six Flags Darien Lake, Darien Center, New York	United States	1990	Wooden roller coaster
Comet	29		Six Flags Great Escape, Queensbury, New York	United States	1994	Wooden roller coaster
Apocalypse the Ride	29		Six Flags Magic Mountain, Valencia, California	United States	2009	Wooden roller coaster
Bad Schwanberg Hunting Blind	29		Bad Schwanberg	Austria		Tallest hunting blind in the world
Puukuokka		8	Kuokkala	Finland	2015	
Strandparken		8	Sundbyberg Municipality	Sweden	2014	
Upper Hale Radio Tower	27.4		Farnham	United Kingdom		
Yongning Pavilion (the wooden part)	27	3	Yanqing District, Beijing	China	2019	
Portland Observatory	26	7	Portland, Maine	United States	1807	National Register of Historic Places
Carbon12	26	8	Portland, Oregon	United States	2018	
Heartwood	26	8	Seattle	United States	2023	
Mine Blower	25		Fun Spot America, Kissimmee, Florida	United States	2017	Wooden roller coaster
WoodCity		8	Helsinki	Finland		
Brewery Lofts	23	7	Tacoma, Washington	United States	2020	Second tallest in the United States
T3		7	Minneapolis	United States	2016	
Prinkipo Greek Orthodox Orphanage	24	6	Istanbul	Turkey	1903	
Curtain Place		6	London	United Kingdom	2015	
FCBA		6	Champs-sur-Marne	France		
Arboretum		6	Nanterre	France	2023	
Gaia		6	Nanyang Technological University (NTU) in Singapore	Singapore	2023	NTU's 8th zero-energy building, uses concrete reinforcement, largest timber building
80 Atlantic	28	5	Toronto	Canada	2019	
Founders Hall		5	Seattle	United States	2022	
Upper Secondary School		5	Helsinki	Finland	2022	
NIOA		5	Brisbane	Australia	2021	
PAE Living Building		5	Portland	United States	2021	
Switchback	20		ZDT's Amusement Park, Seguin, Texas	United states	2015	Wooden roller coaster

=== Destroyed or demolished structures ===
Structure	Height (m)	Floors	Location	Country	Dates	Notes
Masts of Radio San Paolo	217.6	n/a	Rome	Italy	1917-?	3 guyed masts, source:
Mühlacker radio transmitter	190	n/a	Mühlacker, Baden-Württemberg	Germany	1934-1945	Not a building; demolished on April 6, 1945
Federal Telegraph Company, twin guyed radio towers	184.7	n/a	Heeia, Hawaii and South San Francisco, California	United States	1914-1945?	These were not freestanding structures
Berlin-Tegel radio transmitter	165	n/a	Berlin	Germany	1933-1948	In 1940, the height of the tower was reduced to 86 meters. The tower was demolished by bombing on December 16, 1948 due to concerns of interfering with air traffic flying into the nearby (now defunct) Berlin-Tegel International airport.
Sendeturm Ismaning	163	n/a	Ismaning, Bavaria	Germany	1934-1983	Demolished on March 16, 1983
Holzsendeturm Langenberg	160	n/a	Velbert, North Rhine-Westphalia	Germany	1934-1935	Destroyed on October 10, 1935 by a tornado
Sendeturm Wiederau	150	n/a	Pegau, Saxony	Germany	1935-1953	Demolished on October 27th, 1953
Central Mast of Ballybunion Radio Station	150	n/a	Ballybunion	Ireland	1915-1925	Guyed mast
RV-49 radio tower	150	n/a	Omsk	Russia	1942-1956	
Sendeturm Billwerder-Moorfleet	145	n/a	Hamburg	Germany	1933-1949	
Żórawina radio transmitter	140	n/a	Żórawina	Poland	1932-1990	Demolished in Fall 1990
Yongning Pagoda (永宁宝塔)	137	9	Luoyang	China	516-534	With possibly earthen core at seven of nine stories. Including a pedestal it had a height of 155 m from 152.77 m. Destroyed by lightning/fire in 534.
Herstedvester Radio Tower	125	n/a	Albertslund	Denmark	1933-1975	
Kleinreuth radio tower	124	n/a	Nuremberg, Bavaria	Germany	1935-1961	
Madona Radio Towers	116	n/a	Madona	Latvia	1932-1944	2 towers with triangular cross section
Heilsberg Radio Tower	115	n/a	Lidzbark Warmiński	Poland	1935-1940	
Large Masts of Herstedvester Shortwave Transmitter	110	n/a	Albertslund	Denmark	1948-1975	
Freiburg-Lehen Transmission Tower	107	n/a	Freiburg, Baden-Württemberg	Germany	1933-1945	
Trier Radio Tower	107	n/a	Trier, Rhineland-Palatinate	Germany	1935-1948	
Heiligenstock Transmission Tower	107	n/a	Frankfurt am Main, Hesse	Germany	1934-1945	
Koblenz Transmission Tower	107	n/a	Koblenz, Rhineland-Palatinate	Germany	1934-1965	
Heilsberg T-type antenna radio transmitter towers	102	n/a	Lidzbark Warmiński	Poland	1930-1935	2 towers
Ring Masts of Ballybunion Radio Station	100	n/a	Ballybunion	Ireland	1915-1925	6 guyed masts
Large Masts of Skamlebæk Radio Station	100	n/a	Odsherred	Denmark	1931-?	4 guyed masts
Amalienau Radio Tower	100	n/a	Kaliningrad	Russia	1935-1938	
RV-49 radio tower	100	n/a	Chelyabinsk	Russia	1935-?	guyed mast, demolished
Reichenbach Radio Tower	100	n/a	Reichenbach/Oberlausitz, Saxony	Germany	1937-1945	
Mühlacker T-type antenna radio transmitter towers	100	n/a	Mühlacker, Baden-Württemberg	Germany	1930-1934	Two towers; not buildings; repurposed later; demolished
Golm Radio Tower	100	n/a	Potsdam, Brandenburg	Germany	1948-1979	
Linacher Höhe Wind Measurement Mast	99	n/a	Furtwangen, Baden-Württemberg	Germany	2013-2014	Guyed mast for wind measurements
Latting Observatory	96	n/a	New York City	United States	1853-1856	Burned down in 1856
Stettin Radio Tower	93	n/a	Szczecin	Poland	1934-1938	
Flensburg-Jürgensby Radio Tower	90	n/a	Flensburg, Schleswig-Holstein	Germany	1935-1957	
Utbremen Radio Tower	90	n/a	Bremen	Germany	1933-1939	
Hainholz Radio Tower	90	n/a	Hannover, Lower Saxony	Germany	1933-1940	
Hwangnyongsa	80	9	Gyeongju	China	7th century	Destroyed in 1238 by invading Mongol forces
Kolchak Radio mast	80	n/a	Omsk	Russia	1918-?	guyed mast, demolished
Raderthal transmitter	80	n/a	Cologne, North Rhine-Westphalia	Germany	1927-1932	2 towers
Mittersill goods transport ropeway tower	80	n/a	Mittersill	Austria	1943-1955	Tower of a ropeway for goods transport, which never went in service
Stadelheim Transmitter	75	n/a	Munich-Stadelheim, Bavaria	Germany	1926-193?	2 towers
Broadcasting towers of KYW	74.68	n/a	Whitemarsh, Pennsylvania	United States	1934-1949	4 towers, each consisting of a 13.72 metres tall wooden tower with a 60.96 metres tall steel pole insulated against ground on the top
Reception towers of Chain Home	73.15	n/a	Various locations	United Kingdom	1939-1960	
Cricklade Radio Tower	73.15	n/a	Cricklade	United Kingdom	1967-2000	
Rottenbuch Transmission Tower	71	n/a	Peiting, Bavaria	Germany	2002-2026	wooden lattice tower, replaced by a steel tower
Eberswalde Radio Tower	70	n/a	Eberswalde, Brandenburg	Germany	1929-1939	Guyed mast
Wooden tower of Zeesen radio station	70	n/a	Zeesen, Brandenburg	Germany	1931-1939	
Son Of Beast	66.4		Kings Island, Mason, Ohio	United States	2000-2012	Wooden roller coaster
Reception Tower Utlandshörn	65	n/a	Norddeich, Lower Saxony	Germany	1935-1977	
Four Towers of Marconi Wireless Station	64	n/a	South Wellfleet	United States	1902	U.S. National Register of Historic Places
Masts of KWG-Transmitter	61	n/a	Stockton, California	United States	1931-199?	2 wooden poles used for carrying a T-antenna for broadcasting on 1230 kHz. The lower parts of these masts still exist.
Hangar of Naval Air Station Hitchcock	61	n/a	Hitchcock, Texas	United States	1943-1962	airship hangar, demolished after hurricane damage in 1961
Towers of Palatine Transmitter	60	n/a	Kaiserslautern, Rhineland-Palatinate	Germany	1928-1945	2 towers
Towers of Huizen transmitter	60	n/a	Huizen	Netherlands	1937-1940	2 towers on a rotable platform
Hangar 2 of Naval Air Station South Weymouth		n/a	Weymouth, Massachusetts	United States	1942-1953	airship hangar
Hangar 2 of Naval Air Station Weeksville		n/a	Elizabeth City, North Carolina	United States	1942-1995	airship hangar, destroyed by fire
Hangars of Naval Air Station Richmond		n/a	Miami-Dade County, Florida	United States	1942-1945	3 airship hangars, destroyed by fire
Hangar of Houma–Terrebonne Airport		n/a	Houma, Louisiana	United States	1943-1947	airship hangar
Hangar 1 of Marine Corps Air Station Tustin	59	n/a	Tustin, California	United States	1942-2023	airship hangar, destroyed by fire
Hangar A of Naval Air Station Tillamook	59		Tillamook, Oregon	United States	1942-1992	airship hangar, destroyed by fire
Hangar 3 of Moffett Federal Airfield	58		Santa Clara County, California	United States	1942-2024	airship hangar
Wardenclyffe Tower	57	n/a	Shoreham	United States	1899-1917	National Register of Historic Places
Hangars of Naval Air Station Glynco	55	n/a	Glynn County, Georgia	United States	1942-1971	2 airship hangars
Rattler	54.8		Six Flags Fiesta Texas, San Antonio, Texas	United States	1992-2012	Wooden roller coaster
Tower II of Brück antenna test facility	54	n/a	Brück, Brandenburg	Germany	1958-1979	Used for antenna measurements, destroyed on April 20th, 1979 by a fire
Towers of Sahlenburg Marine Radio Station	50	n/a	Cuxhaven, Lower Saxony	Germany	1937-1970	3 towers
Towers of Stolp radio transmitter	50	n/a	Slupsk	Poland	1938-1955	7 towers
Masts of Blåvand Coast Radio Station	50	n/a	Varde	Denmark	1938-?	3 guyed masts
Mean Streak	49.1		Cedar Point, Sandusky, Ohio	United States	1991-2016	Wooden roller coaster
Jelenia Gora Radio Tower	47	n/a	Jelenia Gora	Poland	1957-1967	
Dreiliņi Radio Reception Tower	45	n/a	Riga	Latvia	1934-?	
Towers of triangular antenna of Langenberg transmitter	45	n/a	Velbert, North Rhine-Westphalia	Germany	1935-1945	3 towers, which carried 3 T-antennas
Texas Giant	43.6		Six Flags Over Texas, Arlington, Texas	United States	1990-2009	Wooden roller coaster
Wooden Mast of Vilnius Radio Transmitter	42.5	n/a	Vilnius	Lithuania	1927-1932	Held together with a steel mast of same height as the antenna – first broadcasting transmitter in Lithuania
White Cyclone	42.4		Nagashima Spa Land, Kuwana, Mie	Japan	1994-2018	Wooden roller coaster
Kashin Radio Mast	42	n/a	Russia	Kashin	1926-?	Wooden mast
Masts of Skagen Coast Radio Station	40	n/a	Skagen	Denmark	1939-?	3 guyed masts
Kisbér Nokia Cellphone Transmission Tower	40	n/a	Kisbér	Hungary	2002-2015	wooden lattice tower, replaced by a steel tower
Máriakálnok Cellphone Transmission Tower	40	n/a	Máriakálnok	Hungary	?-2023	
Balatonudvari Cellphone Transmission Tower 1	25	n/a	Balatonudvari	Hungary	?-2023	wooden lattice tower, replaced by a steel tower
Great tower of Kiwi	10/15	n/a	Italy		2024-?	Wooden mast

=== Proposed, under construction, and unfinished structures ===
Structure	Height (m)	Floors	Location	Country	Dates	Status
W350 Project	350	70	Tokyo	Japan	2041	Proposed in 2018 Planned
Oakwood Tower	304.8	80	London-Barbican	United Kingdom		Research
River Beech Tower	228	80	Chicago	United States		Proposed
The Dutch Mountains I	133		Eindhoven	Netherlands	2030	Proposed
Timber Towers		40, 60	Philadelphia	United States		Planned: Demonstration & Research Phase
C6	183	50	Perth	Australia		Proposed
Canada Earth Tower		40	Vancouver	Canada		Proposed
Trätoppen	133	40	Stockholm	Sweden		Proposed
Atlassian Central		39	Haymarket	Australia	2026	Under Construction
The Rainbow Tree	115	32	Cebu	Philippines		Proposed
The Edison	110	32	Milwaukee	United States	2027	Under Construction
The Dutch Mountains II	96		Eindhoven	Netherlands	2030	Planned
Burė 4	105		Vilnius	Lithuania		Planned
Rocket & Tigerli	100	32	Winterthur	Switzerland	2026	
187 Victoria Square	100	31	Adelaide	Australia	2024	
Burj Zanzibar	96	28	Zanzibar	Tansania	2026	Proposed
Tokio Marine Holdings	100	20	Tokyo	Japan	2028	Under development
Dushan Shuisi Building (独山水司楼)	99.9	24	Pingzhai (坪寨), Wengqi Village, Yingshan Town, Dushan County, Guizhou	China	2019	
WoHo	98	29	Berlin	Germany		
The Spar	91.44	48	Portland, Oregon	United States		Proposed: Research Phase
Technical Administration Building		32	Düsseldorf, North Rhine-Westphalia	Germany		Proposal
191-199 College Street	90	31	Toronto	Canada		
Baobab		35	Paris	France		Proposed
Burrard Exchange	79.2	16	Vancouver	Canada		On Hold
CF Møller Wooden		34 x 4	Stockholm	Seden		Proposed
Abebe Court Tower		26	Lagos	Nigeria		Proposal
Urban Lung		25	Cardiff	United Kingdom		Proposal
Prototype		21	Mount Pleasant	Canada		
Treetop Tower		16	Hammerbrooklyn	Germany	2024	To be built
U of T Academic Tower	74.5	14	Toronto	Canada	2019	To be built
Tham & Videgård		20	Frihamnen	Sweden		Proposed
Terrace House	71	19	Vancouver	Canada		On hold
oWow 1523 Harrison Street		19	Oakland	United States		
Mitsui Fudosan & Takenaka corp	70	17	Nihonbashi district, Tokyo	Japan	2023-2025	
Tree Tower	62	18	Toronto	Canada		Proposed
Albizzia	56	16	Lyon	France	2022	Under Construction
Vertical Village	50	17	Île-de-France	France		To be built
Wood'Up	50	18	Paris	France	2021	Planned
The Arbour	52.5	12	Toronto	Canada	2024	Planned
Framework	24+	12	Portland, Oregon	United States		Cancelled
Horizons bois		12	Rennes	France		Proposed
Riverfront Square		6,8,11	Newark, New Jersey	United States		Searching tenants
Shibuya Marui Department Store		9	Shibuya Crossing, Tokyo	Japan		Planned
Tameike Project		9	1-1-14 Akasaka, Minato-ku, Tokyo	Japan	2023	Under Construction
2100 N. Southport Ave.	36	9	Dickens Avenue, on the western edge of the Lincoln Park neighborhood Chicago	United States	2023	construction is set to start 2025
Great tower of Kiwi II	30	n/a	Italy		2026	Planned
Wandsbek		8	Wandsbek	Germany	2026	
2 Copper Square		8	London	United Kingdom		Planned
Dutch Mountain		7	Veldhoven	Netherlands	2021	Cancelled
Inspire Barcelona		6	Barcelona, 22@	Spain	2023	Under Construction
Academic Wood Tower		14	Toronto	Canada	2026	Under Construction

== See also ==
- List of tallest buildings and structures
- List of tallest structures
- List of tallest church buildings
- List of tallest Orthodox churches
- List of tallest domes
- List of tallest mosques
- List of tallest crosses
