= Eichberg =

Eichberg (German: oak mountain) may refer to:

- Eichberg (surname)
- Eichberg, St. Gallen, Switzerland
- Eichberg, Austria, a town in Styria, Austria
- Eichberg Tower, an observation tower near Emmendingen, Germany
- SS Eichberg, a German cargo ship in service 1944-45
