= Blumenthal Observation Tower =

Observation tower in Brandenburg, Germany

Coordinates: 53°05′29″N 12°20′58″E

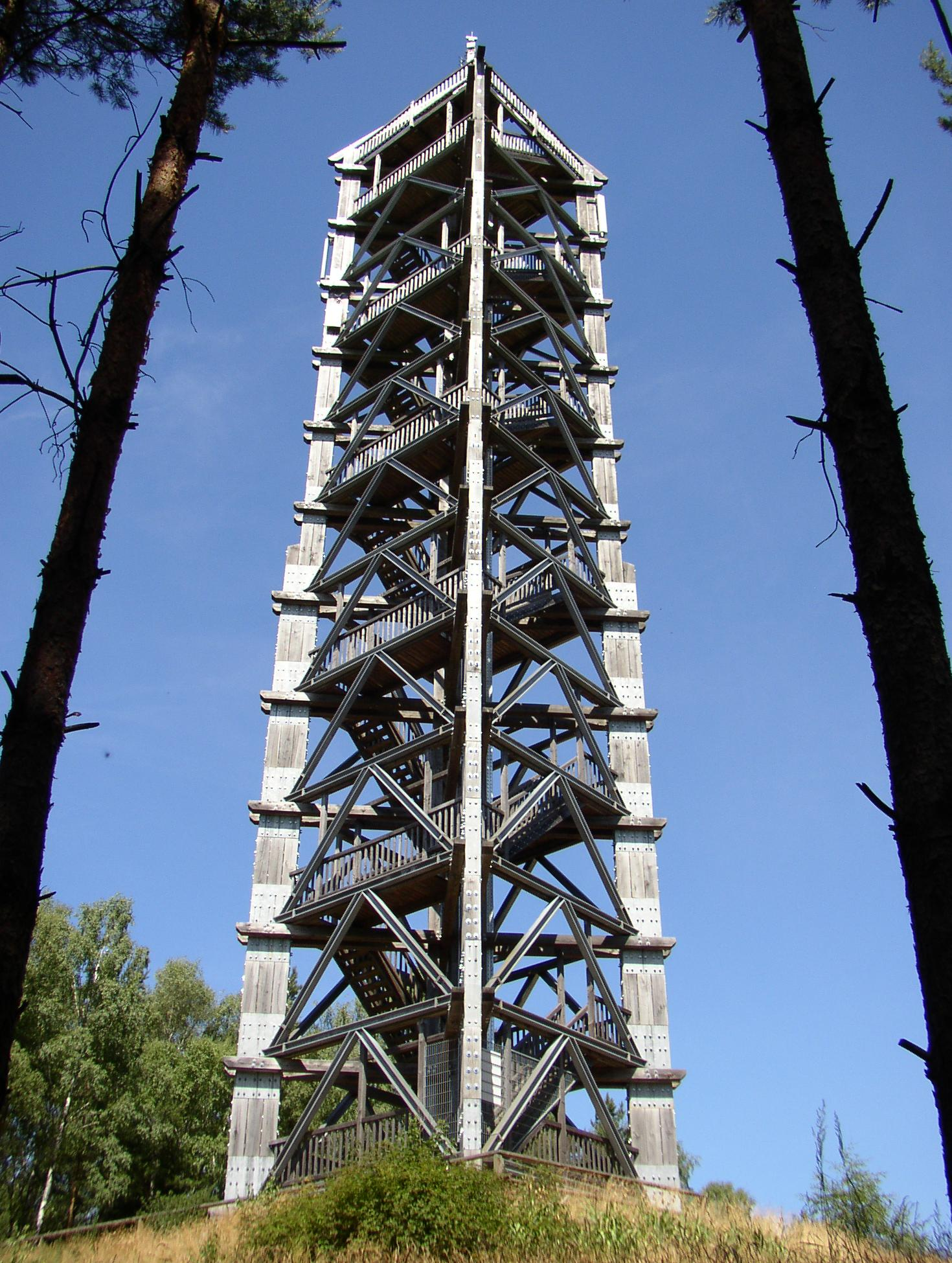
The tower

The Blumenthal Observation Tower is a 45-metre-tall (148 ft) observation tower built of wood in Blumenthal, part of the municipality Heiligengrabe, Brandenburg, Germany.

== Overview ==
The Blumenthal Observation Tower was inaugurated on September 18, 2004, and is the tallest observation tower built of wood in Germany. It is not however the tallest wooden construction built in Germany: the towers of the Brück aerial testing facility, the Rottenbuch Radio Tower, neither of which is accessible for tourists, and the Jahrtausendturm are taller.

The Blumenthal Observation Tower has an observation deck 36.4 metres in height, accessible by 187 stairs. The whole construction weighs 210 tons.
