= Karyatis =

Karyatis may refer to -

- Caryatis, an Ancient Greek goddess
- SS Karyatis, a Greek cargo ship in service 1964–68
- Caryatis, see Caryatid
