= Elbauenpark =

Family and leisure park in Magdeburg, Germany

Coordinates: 52.137°N 11.670°E

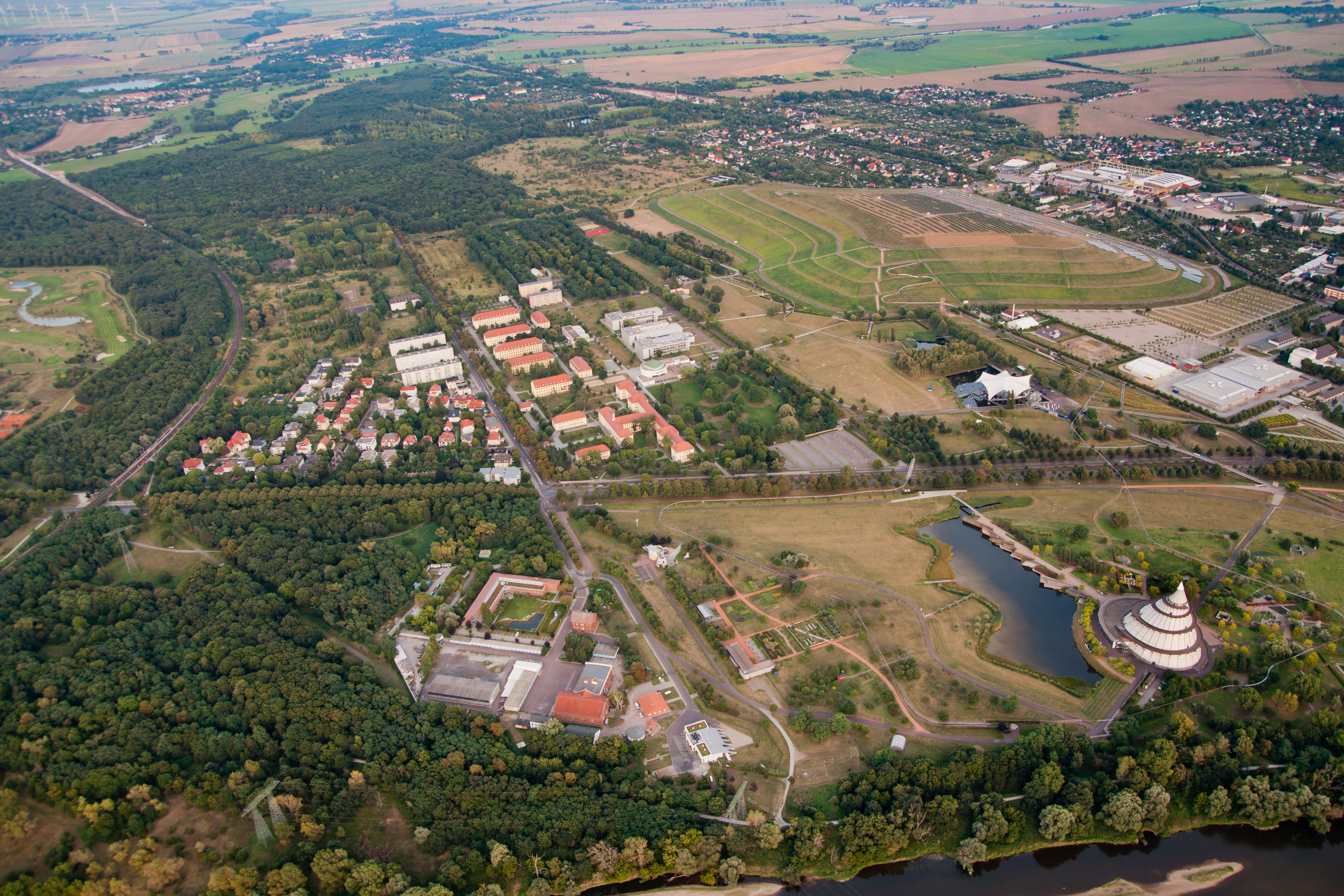
Aerial view of the Elbauenpark (right half)

The Elbauenpark is a family and leisure park in Magdeburg, capital city of Saxony-Anhalt, Germany.

The park area is about 100 hectares and consists of the parts Kleiner Anger and Großer Anger. The park areas are connected with a pedestrian bridge over the Herrenkrugstraße. The park has a total of four combined entrances and exits as well as three exits. According to the Stern magazine, the Elbauenpark is the best leisure attraction in Saxony-Anhalt.

== History ==
A ride on the Panoramabahn a few weeks before the shutdown

It was created on the occasion of the Bundesgartenschau 1999 in Magdeburg on the Cracauer Anger. In the north-eastern part of Magdeburg there used to be Wehrmacht barracks and shooting ramparts built in the 1930s. After the Second World War, the barracks were used by the western Group of Soviet Forces in Germany. A huge rubbish dump was created from the ruins of the war's destruction. Before the construction of the park all explosive ordnance, projectiles and countless rubble from the war had to be removed in order to realize this project. In just a few years, a park was created on this former field of war debris, attracting numerous visitors. From 1999 to the 2014 season, the Panoramabahn, an elevated monorail, ran 3 km through the park. It was dismantled at the beginning of 2015.

== Park attractions ==
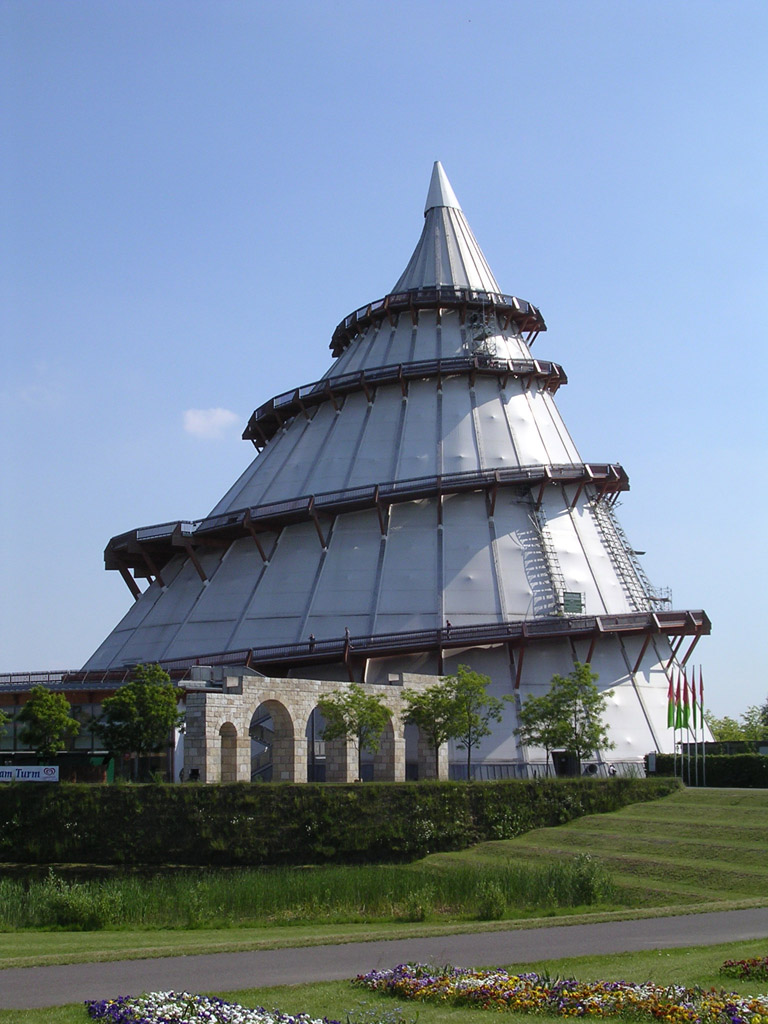
The Millennium Tower: a landmark of the Elbauenpark visible from afar

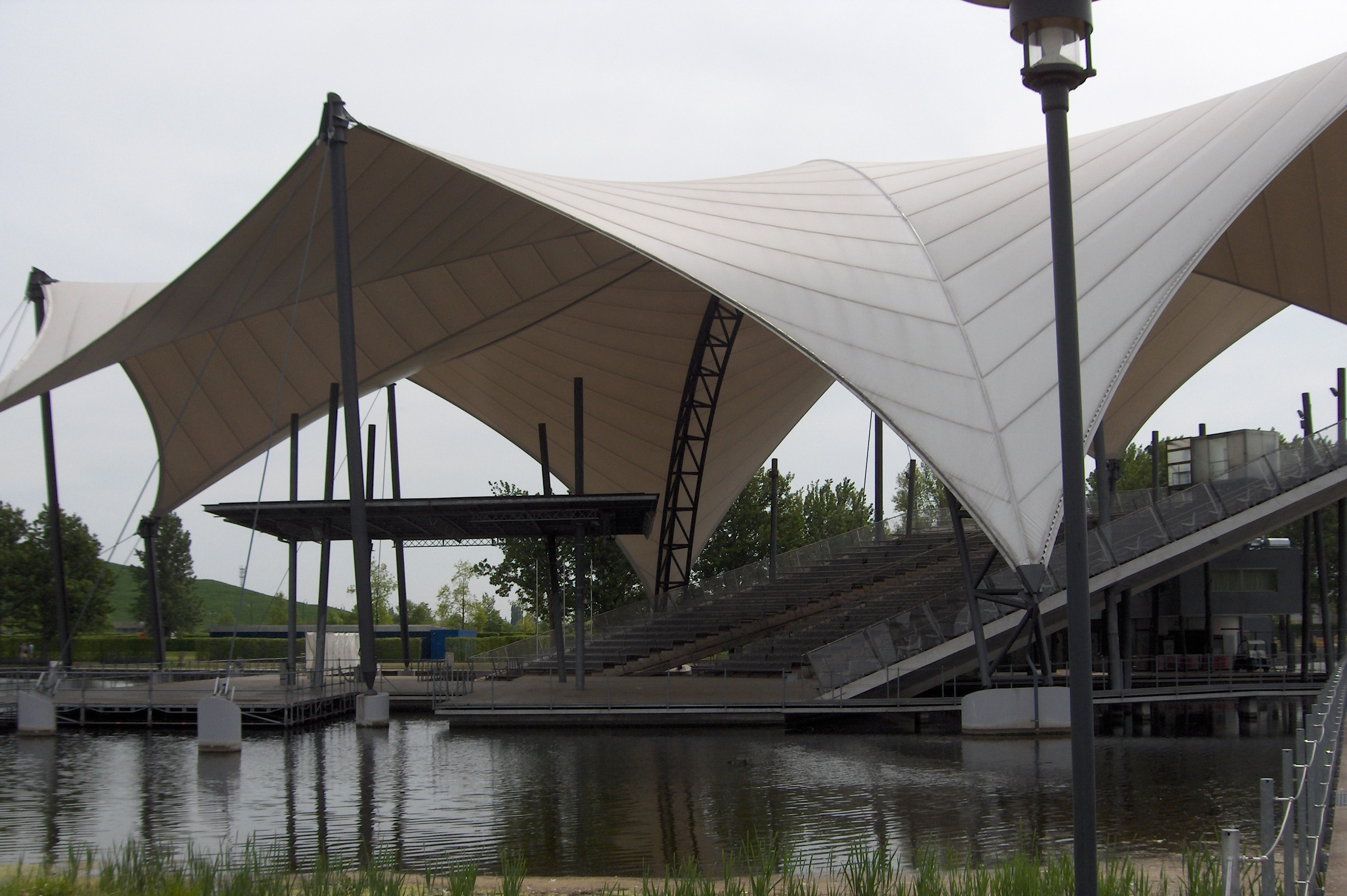
The lake stage

- The Millennium Tower: 6000 years of human history in a unique exhibition
- The Play and Project House: An open house for children aged 0–14. Here children can simply do what they want but also take part in projects, paint or do handicrafts. The special feature of the house is on the one hand the concept, which contains participation as the main criterion and the fact that this house was planned to a large extent by the children.
- The theme gardens: 14 gardens, designed according to various themes.
- The lake stage: open-air stage with 1,600 seats for events
- The summer toboggan run: a 400-metre-long sheet metal toboggan run
- The ramparts: numerous climbing and recreational opportunities for families and children
- The butterfly house: 200 exotic butterflies in one house
- The sports area: playing fields for soccer, volleyball, beach volleyball, handball and basketball.
- The climbing tower: climbing the 25-metre-high Großer Angerfelsen
- The climbing park: climbing on 55 elements and 2 cable cars in the high ropes course
- The maze: a labyrinth of hedges and trellises

In addition there are various garden arts, e.g. rose gardens, bamboo grove, shrub garden, European garden, paradisiacal gardens or renewable resources; a skater course, the Kneipp garden, a frisbee golf course, a fitness course with extensive explanations, a water playground, a bee house, the school project "Green Path" and the God's Garden House, a pavilion which was used as an ecumenical meeting centre during the Bundesgartenschau.

There are also several bistros, a restaurant in the Millennium Tower and a beer garden. Throughout the season (April to October), numerous events take place in the park; in 2016 and 2017, the VOX television programme Grill den Henssler was a guest on the lake stage for three editions each.

The park is part of the Saxony-Anhalt Garden Dreams.
