= Frankfurt City Forest =

Forest district in the south of Frankfurt, Germany

Coordinates: 50°04′15″N 8°39′30″E

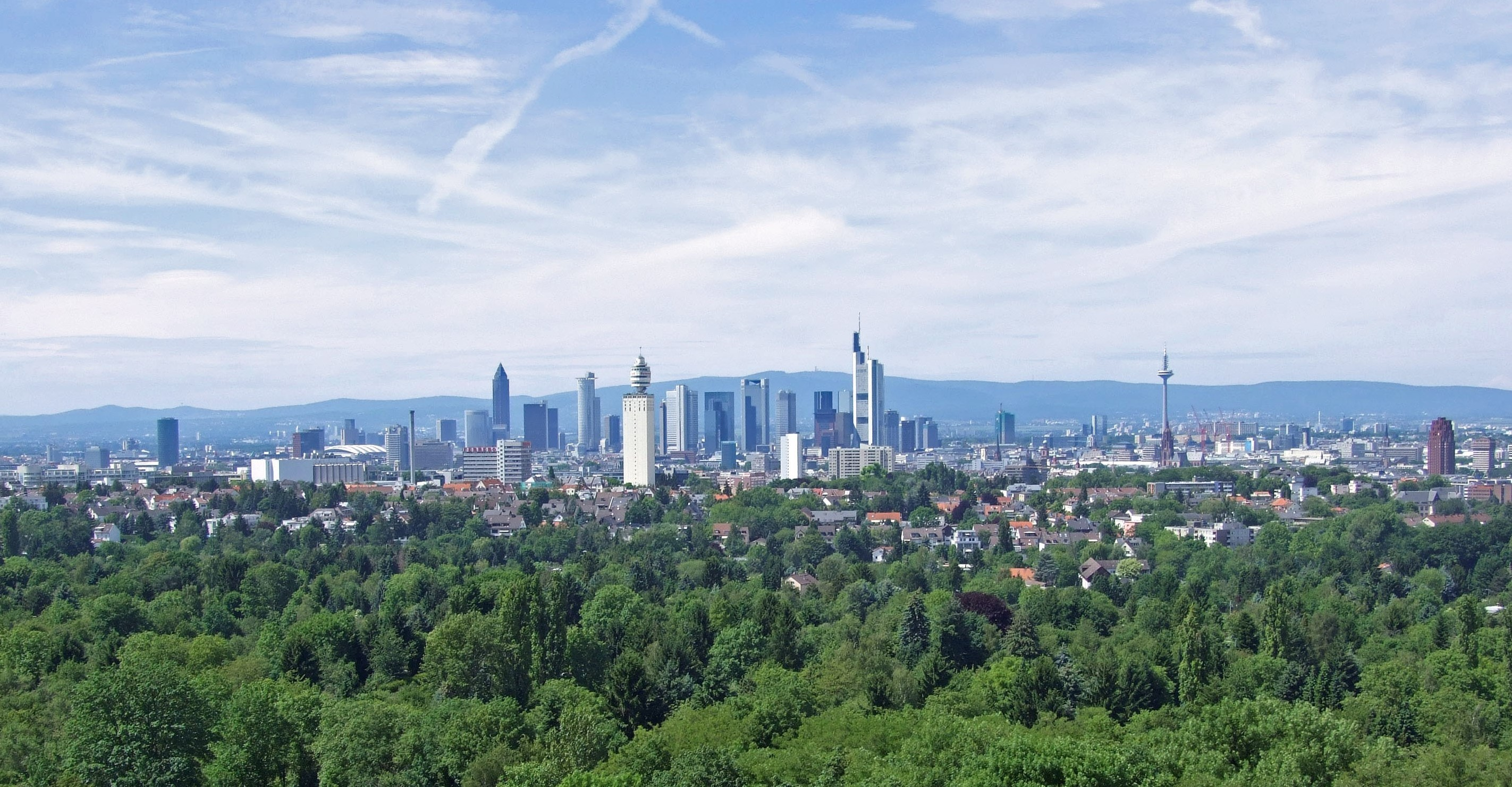
Frankfurt City Forest seen from Goethe Tower, Frankfurt's skyline in the background (2007)

The Frankfurt City Forest or Frankfurter Stadtwald is a forest district in the south of Frankfurt am Main, Germany. There are also other forest areas spread out through the city.

== Basic facts ==
The forest is about 58 square kilometres (39 of which are actually within Frankfurt) and the largest inner-city forest in Germany. It covers the southern areas of Schwanheim, Niederrad, Sachsenhausen and Oberrad, as well the northern parts of the Stadtteil Flughafen district. Four nature trails and sport paths cross the Forest. There are also 1600 seating benches and 25 rest huts, which provide protection in bad weather. Six playgrounds and nine ponds make the forest a popular local attraction.

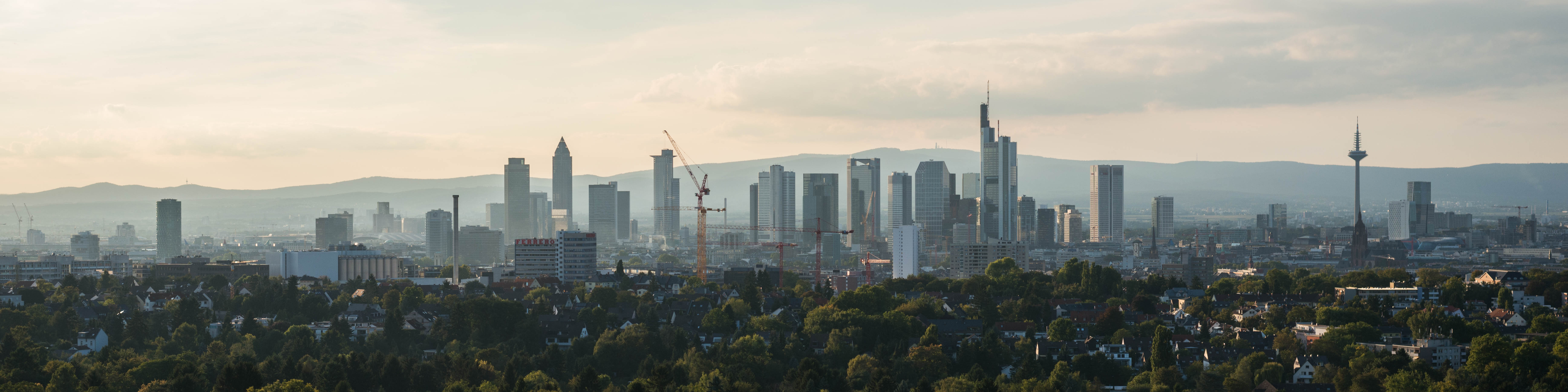
Forest and skyline in August 2014

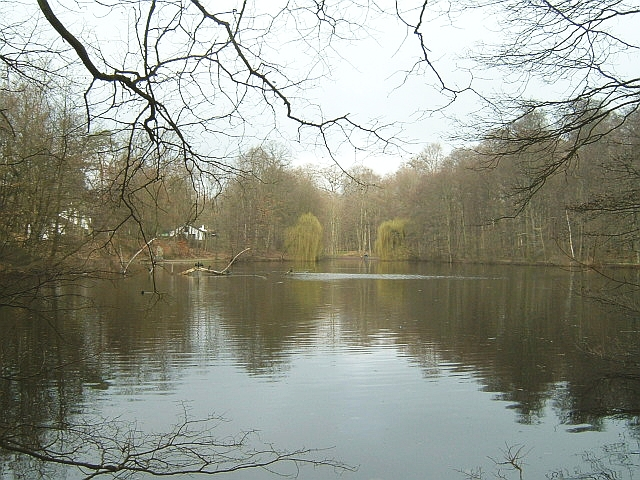
Jacobi pond in the Stadtwald

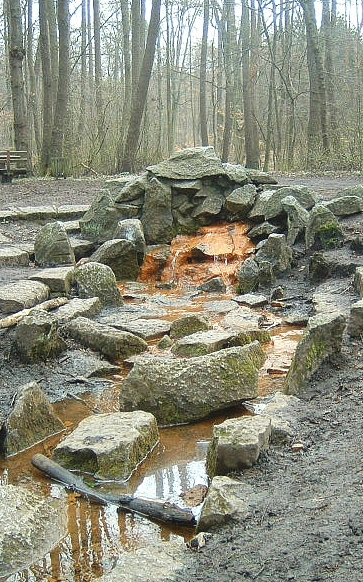
The Königsbrünnchen flows into a pond in the Stadtwald

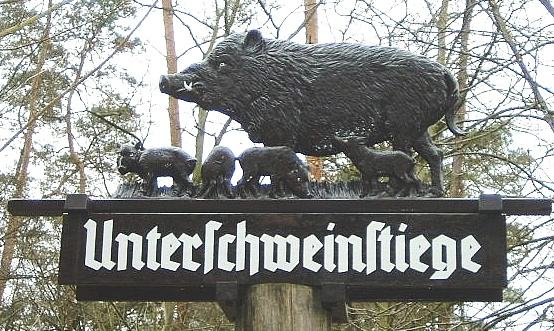
Pig Signpost in the Frankfurt Stadtwald

== History ==
In 1221 the emperor Frederick II gave the Teutonic Knights large parts of the forest and the corresponding grazing rights. In 1372 Frankfurt bought the city forest from Emperor Charles IV and wanted to regain these rights. This sparked a hundred-year fight with the Knights, which ended with a compromise in 1484. The city paid a sum to graze sheep on the land, but the area was limited. One can still see the stones of the border on the Schäfersteinpfad, Shepherd Stone Path.

The use of the forest by farmers for grazing is still evident in the names, Unterschwein- und Oberschweinstiege, which were overnight stables for the acorn and beech nut eating pigs.
