= Carbon12 =

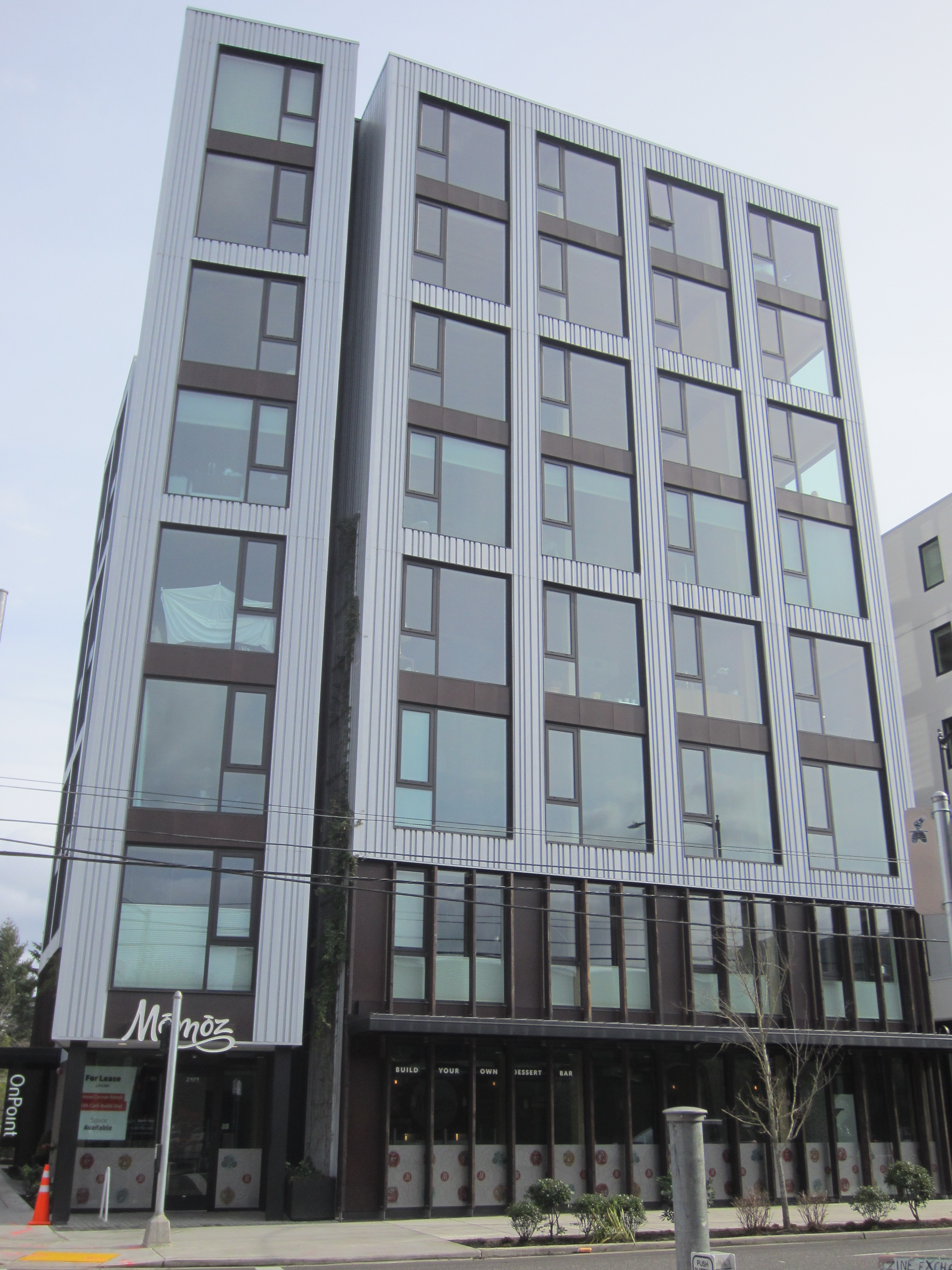
- The building's exterior in 2021
- Interactive map of the Carbon12 area

General information
- Status: Completed
- Type: Mixed-use
- Architectural style: Natural building
- Location: Portland, Oregon, United States
- Coordinates: 45.54814°N 122.66645°W
- Construction started: 2016
- Completed: 2018

Height
- Height: 85 feet (26 m)

Technical details
- Material: Cross laminated timber
- Size: 42,000 sq ft (3,900 m^{2})
- Floor count: 8

Design and construction
- Architecture firm: PATH Architecture
- Developer: Kaiser Group
- Structural engineer: Munzing Structural Engineering, LLC
- Civil engineer: KPFF Consulting Engineers
- Main contractor: Kaiser Group
- Known for: Tallest wood building in the United States

Other information
- Parking: 22 parking spaces

Website
- www.carbon12pdx.com

Carbon12 is a wooden building in Portland, Oregon's Eliot neighborhood, in the United States. The eight-story structure built with Oregon-made cross-laminated timber (CLT) became the tallest wood building in the United States upon its completion.

Carbon12 is an 85 ft. (26 m) mixed-use building situated on the corner of North Williams Avenue and 12 Northeast Fremont Street. It was designed, developed, and built by Ben Kaiser of PATH Architecture and Kaiser Group Inc., using CLT panels made by Structurlam. With a rooftop deck, the height is 95 ft. (29 m). Work on the Carbon12 started in July 2016, and it was completed in 2018. It is named after the atomic weight of carbon (12 AMU), as the carbon footprint was one of the primary motivators to choose timber and its street address (12 NE Fremont St.). The Carbon12 building is advertised to be one of the most efficient and environmentally friendly wooden buildings in the U.S.

== History ==
While the use of timber frames for constructing 1-2 story buildings is typical in many countries (see: timber framing), antiquated building codes in the United States discouraged wood-frame construction in 5-floor buildings or higher for many years. With the advancement of science, construction technologies and innovation have led to engineered wood products with load capacities stronger than steel and fire resilience beyond those required to meet US building code standards. These improved qualities, alongside the historical construction of tall wood buildings in Europe, have led to an acceptance of wood in US construction, and new building codes are being proposed to adjust for this.

The Carbon12 building ran in the USDA's Tall Wood Buildings contest (2014) but did not win the prize. However, Kaieser+Path decided to build it anyway and owned the proposed building site, a competition requirement. This building was subject to the 2015 International Building Code (IBC), under Type III-A construction which limits wood buildings to six stories with height 85’ but designers planned for 8 stories, which led to extra time and cost in getting approvals as the City of Portland had never reviewed a tall CLT project before. In the end, City and state officials waived restrictive codes under the IBC section 104.11 for Alternate materials and method requests (AMMR). They were responsible for reviewing the building's structural and safety aspects through a performance-based analysis. Oregon Governor Kate Brown was present when the building reached its peak height. The Carbon12 is acclaimed as a booster for Oregon's timber industry.

Given the rising popularity of wood construction, Carbon12's title of the tallest wood building in the United States is already being challenged by a 148 feet (45 m), 11-floor wood-framing building in Portland, Framework,(USDA winning proposal) under construction.

== Building details ==
The building measures 85 feet (26 m) high for 8 floors, with two ground-floor retail spaces that activate the neighborhood beneath 14 condominium units (2 units per floor). Each unit has a recessed balcony and a dedicated elevator entrance. It has an underground Automated parking system, which is remote controlled that moves cars to their parking spots on a conveyor system. The building employs mass timber, glued laminated timber (glulam), and CLT (cross-laminated timber) in its structural system. Steel is used in the core and for connecting braces, and concrete for the basement, ground floor, and garage (automated garage).

The spacious, 1,600 square-foot wood-filled residences feature floor-to-ceiling glass and light-filled open-floor plans, equipped with seismic alarm technology and spacious patios. There are no shared walls between units that provide a similar acoustic experience as living in a detached single-family home.

Residents of the Carbon12 have given interviews describing the building as "beautiful" and "bright". Few residents were happy with their savings on utilities, commuting expenses, and some residents have also applauded the building's commitment to universal design, which accommodates individuals who are not typically considered in the use of a building and might otherwise find themselves unable to access areas of a structure or their home.

=== Environmental features ===
Carbon12 is constructed with sustainably harvested and certified CLT, a renewable structural building material that sequesters carbon and acts as a natural insulator that dampens sound and holds in warmth. 132 tons of carbon were sequestered in the CLT, glulam columns and beams of Carbon12. Additionally, having exposed wood interiors provide biophilic experiences, and timber's ability to char delivers natural fire protection. Furthermore, Carbon12 uses a Buckling-restrained brace frame system to handle an earthquake or other natural disasters.

The building's design makes it environmentally friendly, using technologies such as floor-to-ceiling insulated fiberglass windows to reduce thermal bridging and maximize natural daylight. An efficient lighting system using LED lights with remote control systems and sensors for common areas.

The use of solar panels on the roof for the hot water system and exterior lighting reduces damage to the environment by decreasing the amount of fossil fuel needed for the building's domestic, which lowers the amount of greenhouse gas produced and Utility bills. The exterior of the property features clad in vertically striated metal paneling, and a deep cut in façade, drawing light into the central interiors, like a shaft of sunlight penetrating a dense forest.

Carbon12 uses an electric LG Variable Refrigerant Flow system (VRF), an interconnected system that shares the load, making it efficient. The waste produced during the construction process was less due to the modular construction but still recycled and used as biofuel.

== Construction ==
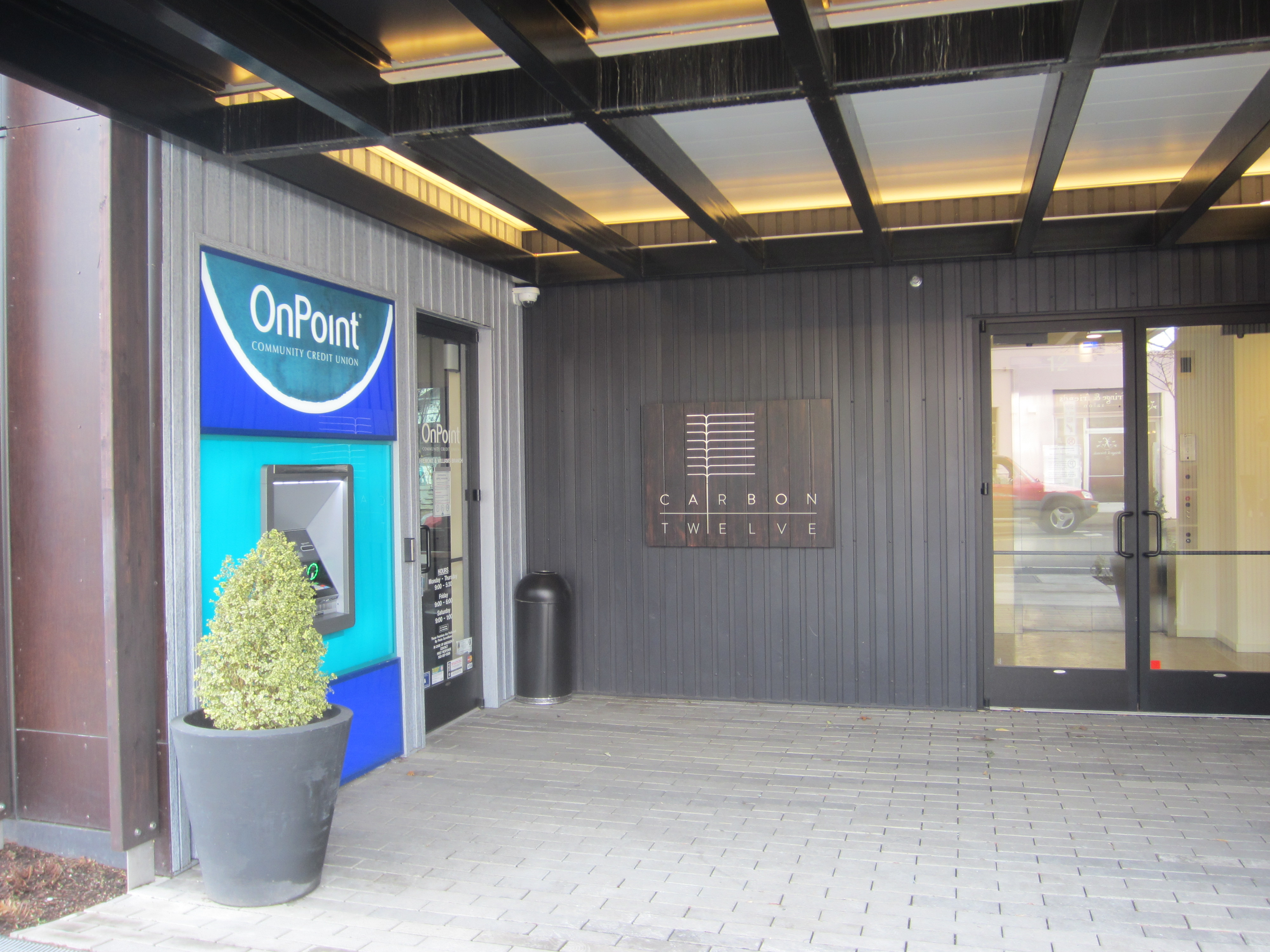
Exterior, 2021

The building was constructed by PATH + Kaiser group from Portland, which also did work on the Radiator building, Oregon (Mass timber building). Munzing structural engineering, LLC provided the best solutions to integrate steel and wood systems in the building.

The primary structure is CLT, which was fabricated at the Structurlam production facilities in Penticton, British Columbia. CLT was made up of many layers of adhered lumber boards stacked at 90° angles for better structural rigidity in both directions. These large panels can be made up to 12 feet wide by 60 feet long. Glulam beams and columns were CNC framed for steel connections based on the CadWork 3D model. Before mass timber was fabricated, Kaiser+Path designed a mini-Carbon12 cross-section to ensure the look, constructability, and mobility. when the mock-up arrived at the site, it was installed and evaluated. Also, It identified the tolerance levels to ensure a tight fit. Following excavation and construction of the foundation, a steel frame erected two stories high, to which timber components were anchored. The whole thing was sequenced. Upon truck arrival, Glulam beams and columns and CrossLam panels were lifted by a tower crane directly from the truck bed into position. Each component was labeled and designated for a specific location in the structure. As everything was prefabricated, very few workers were needed, which means less cost, improved safety, better coordination, and added accountability. Construction was quick, and less waste on-site was observed due to its prefabrication and modular installation. Each floor was assembled in five days. CLT is not cheap, but cost savings were made due to construction speed and reduced waste.

Mass timber can be installed in any temperature and weather condition. Still, when it rained almost constantly for a few weeks, breathable SBS sheets were used, and fans circulated warm air to bring the moisture in the CLT down to the acceptable levels.

A combination of materials was used for the acoustic system to meet the code demand of STC and IIC ratings of 60 and above the code minimum of 50 for residential use. So, Kaiser+Path hired multiple subcontractors to install the initial insulation and base layers, another to install the gypsum concrete topping slab, and finally, one more to install the finished floor products.

Carbon12 was built using a design-build approach with the subcontractors for the Mechanical, Electrical, Plumbing, and Fire systems (MEPF). So they were involved in the predesign phase itself, which helped them create a sequencing plan to install their systems without impeding other's work. As the floors were identical, improvements were made as they progressed.

Because the 2015 Oregon building code did not account for tall timber buildings (8 stories), designers showed the building's safety aspects through computer simulations and modeling. Moreover, sensors were placed beneath the building to monitor the building performance.

== Recognition and legacy ==
In Feb 2019, Carbon12 was the recipient of the 2019 Wood Design Awards (Best multi-family wood design) awarded by the Woodworks. In 2017, the building was featured in the Portland business journal and Daily journal of commerce as the year's transformational project.

As Carbon12 was permitted on the special provision, its performance is monitored by the Colorado School of Mines. This engineering data was somewhat useful in making changes in the 2021 IBC code permitting up to 18 stories. The firm is now in the design and research phase for The Spar, which aspires to become the tallest mass timber building globally, with 36 stories and almost 600,000 sq. ft. of office and commercial space.

== See also ==
- ATLAS-I the largest wooden structure, made from glued laminated timber
- Framework (building)
- List of tallest wooden buildings
