= Palatine Transmitter =

Broadcasting station in Germany

Coordinates: 49.4572°N 7.7723°E

The Palatine Transmitter (German: Pfalzsender) was the first broadcasting station in Kaiserslautern, Rhineland-Palatinate, Germany. It was built in 1926 and used an antenna, which was spun between two 60 m tall free-standing lattice towers, 130 m apart. The towers were made of wood and were the tallest wooden structures ever built in Palatine.

The transmitter, which worked on 1429 kHz with a power of 500 watts, mainly broadcast regional news, as well as news from the "Reichssender" in Berlin. In 1945 the towers were demolished by the retreating German troops, although the transmitter building survived and now houses now a day care centre.
