= Stolp radio transmitter =

German broadcasting station, 1938–1955

Stolp radio transmitter was a broadcasting station close to Rathsdamnitz, Germany ( since 1945: Dębnica Kaszubska, Poland) southeast of Stolp, Germany (since 1945 Słupsk, Poland). The facility, which went in service on December 1, 1938, was designed to explore whether a reduction of fading effects could be achieved via an extended surface antenna, as well as an increase in directionality by changing the phase position of individual radiators. A group of 10 antennas arranged on a circle with 1 km diameter around a central antenna was planned. A model test consisting of a 50 m high, free-standing wooden tower supporting a vertical wire which worked as the antenna was completed.

Until July 1939 six further towers of the same type were built on a circle with 150 m diameter around the central antenna tower. All these towers were the tallest wooden lattice towers with a triangular cross-section ever built in Germany.

The antennas were fed through an underground cable, which runs from the transmitter building, 180 m away from the central tower to the central tower, where a distributor for the transmission power was installed. From this distributor, overhead single-wire lines mounted on 4 m high wooden poles run to the antenna towers on the circle for feeding their antennas with the transmission power.

In 1940 south of the transmission building a 50 m tall guyed mast radiator, which was manufactured by Jucho, was erected.

The facility survived World War II and was shortly after World War II used to broadcast the program of the Russian military broadcaster "Radio Wolga". However, in 1955 the facility was completely demolished after the removal of all technical equipment.
