= Trier Transmitter =

Defunct transmitter in Germany

- Location within Germany
- Location: Trier, Germany
- Tower height: 107 metres (351 ft) (formerly 63 metres (207 ft))
- Coordinates: 49°46′9.75″N 6°39′35.21″E
- Built: 1930s
- Demolished: 1948

The Trier Transmitter was a medium-wave transmitter in Trier, Germany, that went into service in 1932.

== Overview ==
The transmitter was located at Ruwerer Straße 16 (now Herzogenbuscher Straße). From its initial commissioning on February 19, 1933, until 1935, it used a vertical cage aerial that was suspended on a hemp rope between two 63-metre-high wooden towers standing 120 metres apart. In 1935 this antenna was replaced by a 107-metre-high wooden tower with a wire antenna inside.

Between 1932 and September 30, 1936, there was also a radio studio in Trier, which was then moved to Koblenz.

In February 1945, the technical equipment of the transmitter was dismantled by the armed forces. The wooden tower was dismantled in 1948.

In 1950 a new medium-wave transmitter was built on the Petrisberg at 49°45′56″N 6°39′33″E, which used a ground-insulated, guyed steel lattice mast. It was moved in 1958 to Markusberg, where it was in operation until 1974.

== Sources ==
- Andreas Brudnja, Die Geschichte der deutschen Mittelwellen-Sendeanlagen von 1923 bis 1945, ISBN 978-3-939197-51-5, Page 51, 119
