= Eichberg (surname) =

Eichberg is a German or Ashkenazi Jewish surname, meaning 'oak mountain'. Notable people with the surname include:

- Alfred Eichberg (1859–1921), American Jewish architect in Atlanta and Savannah
- Henning Eichberg (1942–2017), German sociologist and historian
- Joseph Eichberg (born 1935), American biologist and professor emeritus
- Julius Eichberg (1824–1893), German-born Jewish American violinist and composer
- Richard Eichberg (1888–1953), German film director and producer
- Robert Eichberg (1945–1995), American psychologist, gay rights activist, and co-founder of National Coming Out Day
- Salomon Eichberg (1786–1880), Jewish cantor in Hohenems and Düsseldorf, teacher of hazzan Salomon Sulzer
- Søren Nils Eichberg (born 1973), German/Danish composer and conductor
