= Reception Tower Utlandshörn =

Coordinates: 53°33′47″N 7°06′28″E

The Reception Tower Utlandshörn was a 65-metre (211 ft) high wood framework tower built of oak wood on the area of the radio reception station Utlandshoern, a part of Norddeich Radio coastal station (callsign DAN).

This tower carried wire antennas of four arms on its top, which were manufactured of teak wood, for the reception of short wave signals. It was built in 1935. In the middle of 1976 it was replaced by an antenna system, which was fastened on steel towers and which also does not exist any more.

At the beginning of 1977 the tower, which was already one of the last large wood towers in Germany, was knocked down with great care.

From the wood of the demolished tower some carvings and ornaments were made.

== See also ==
- List of towers
