= Rottenbuch Radio Tower =

Wooden telecommunications tower in Germany

Coordinates: 47°45′25″N 10°55′55″E

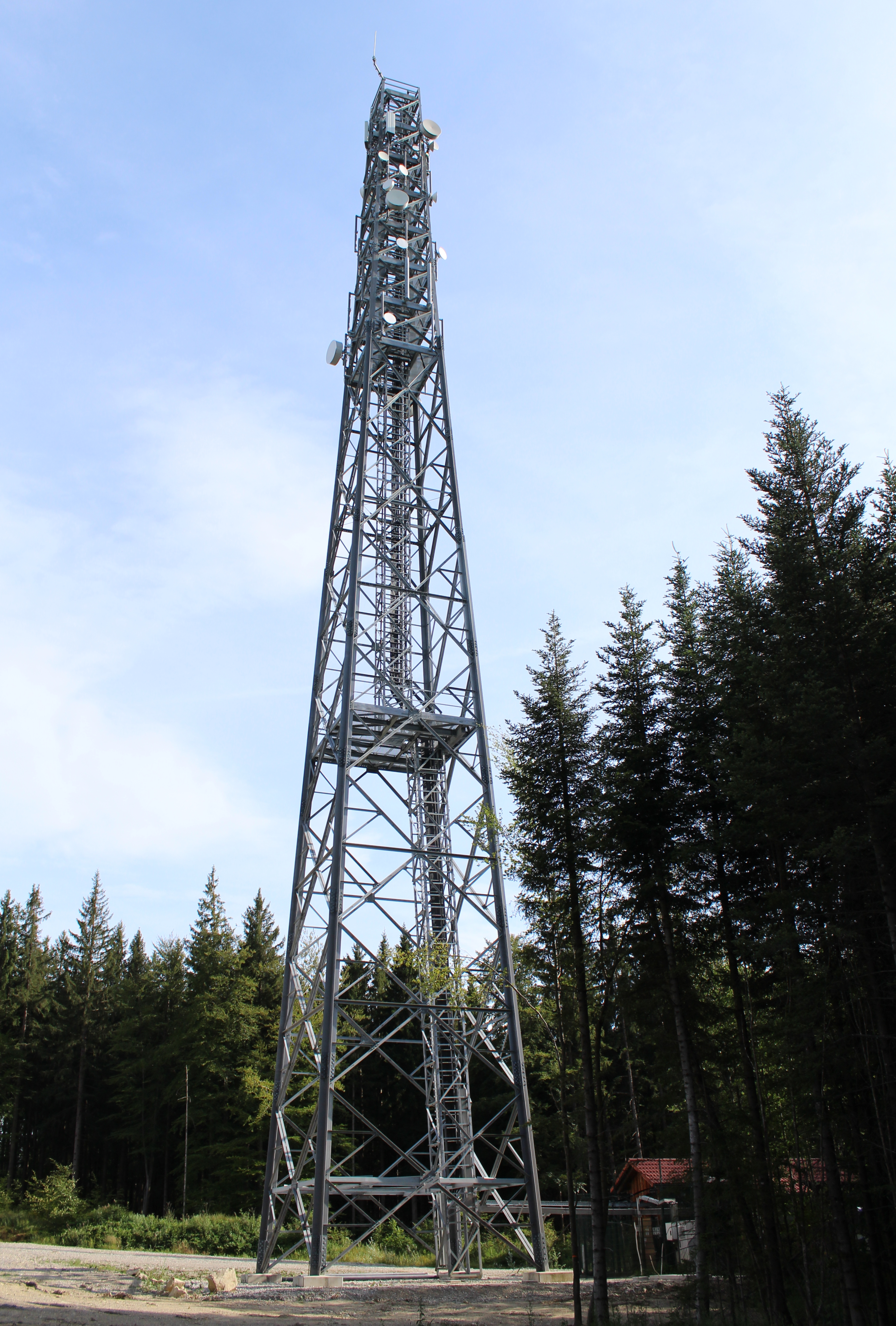
New Radio Tower Rottenbuch, built in 2025 as replacement for the wooden tower, which was erected in 2002

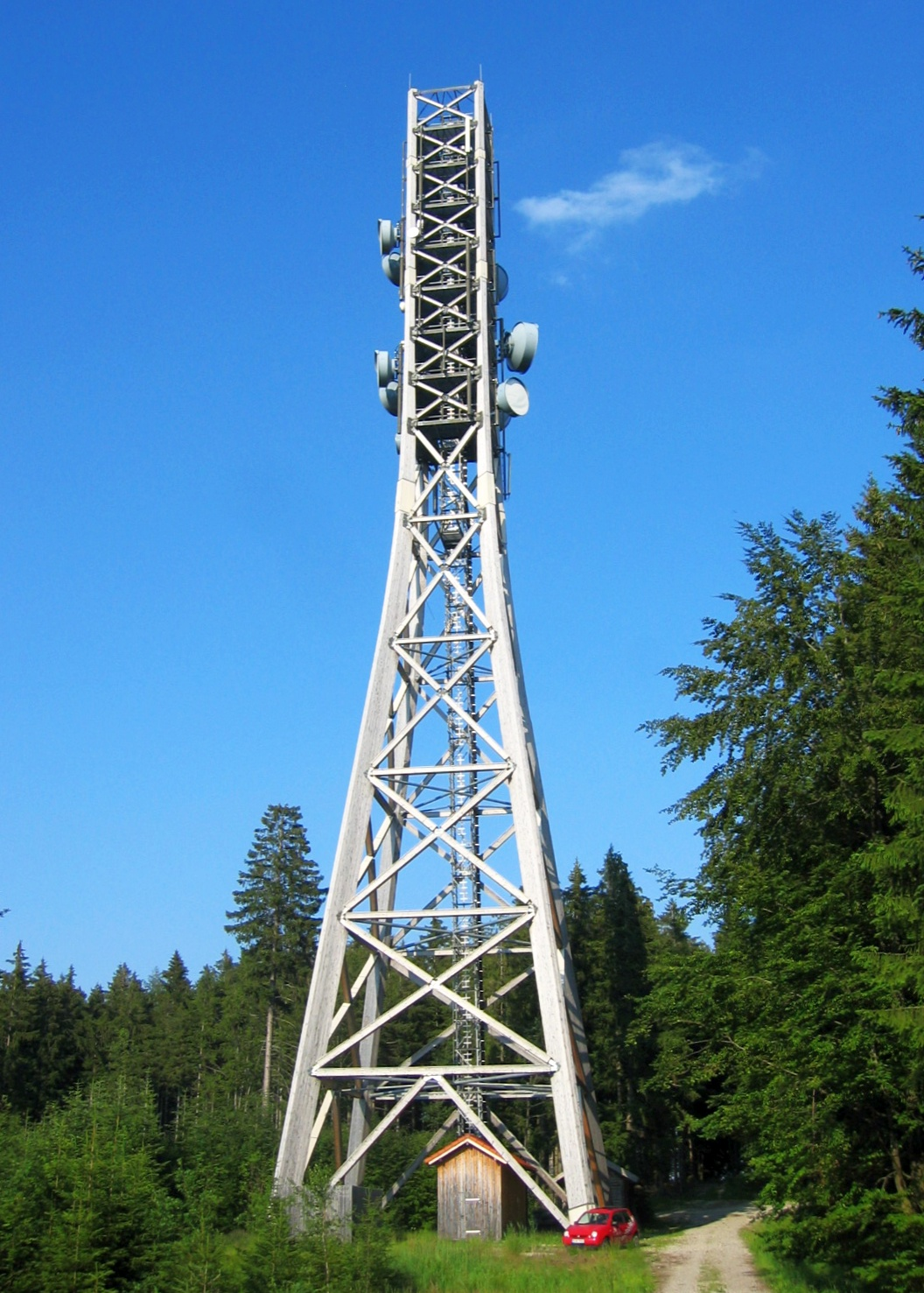
Radio Tower Rottenbuch

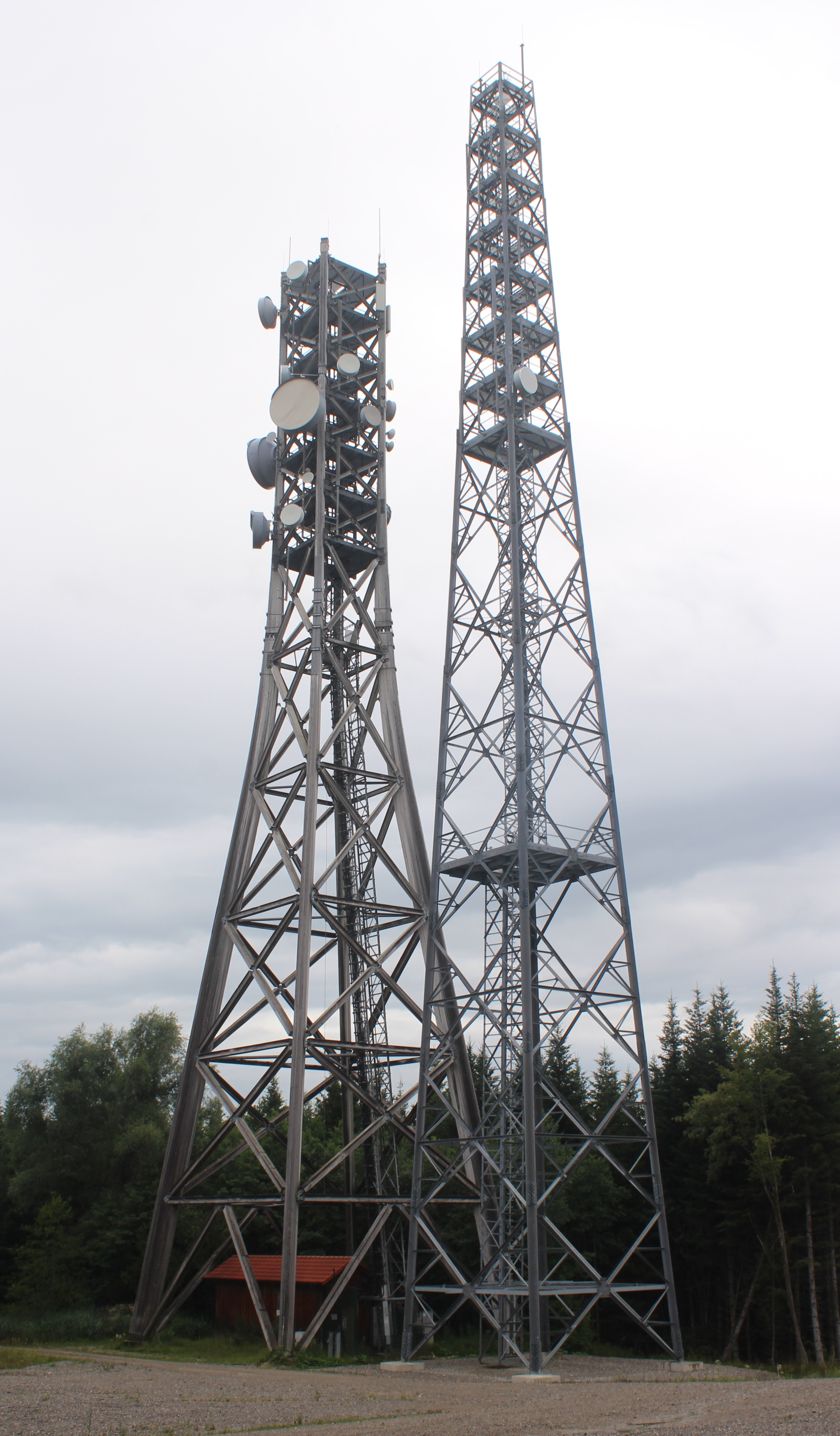
Old (left) and new (right) Rottenbuch Radio Tower

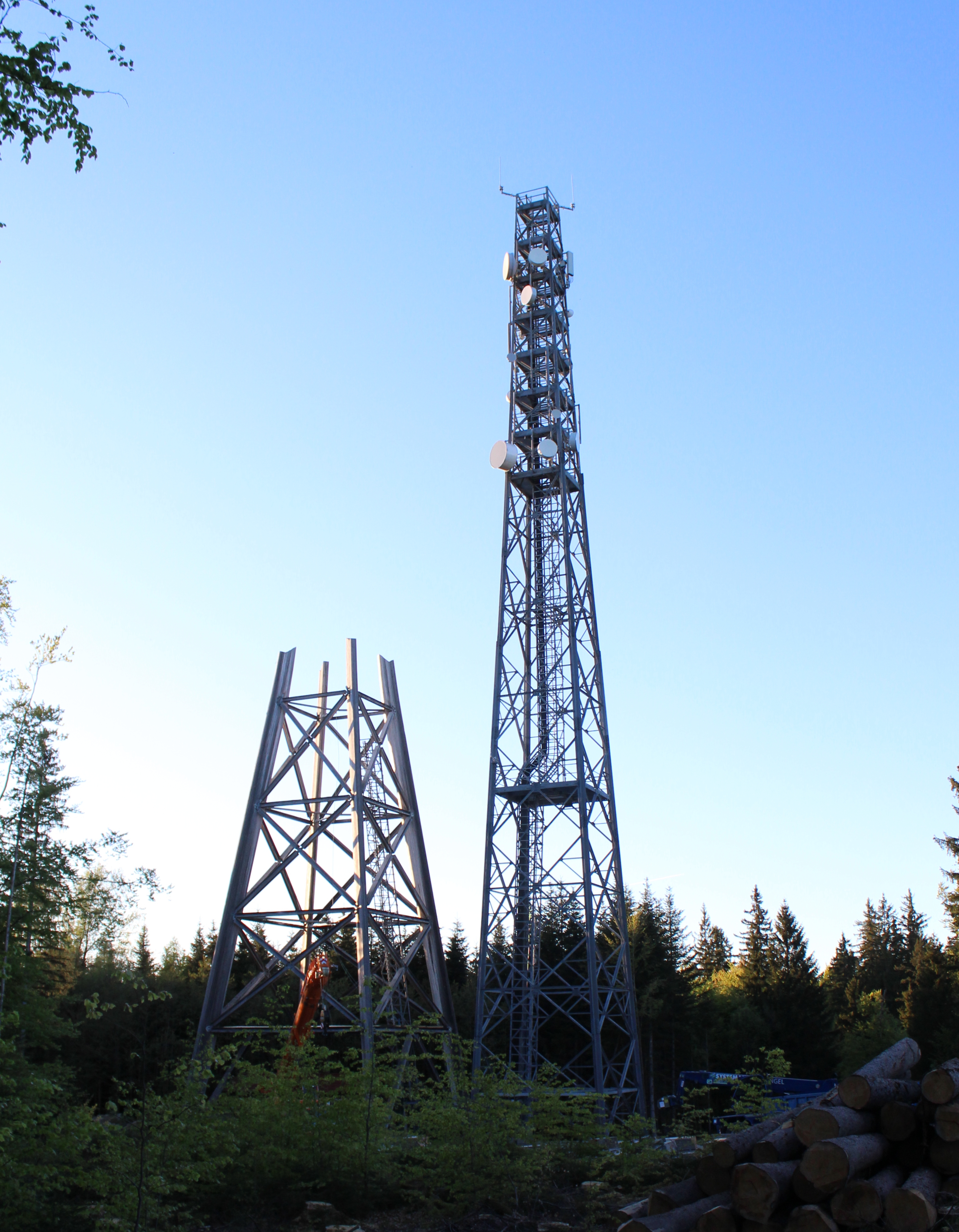
The old wooden Rottenbuch Radio Tower under demolition on May 1st, 2026

The Rottenbuch Radio Tower is a transmitting tower of the Vodafone company, sited between Peiting and Rottenbuch in southern Bavaria, Germany.

The first tower at the site was a wooden lattice tower, which was realized as glued girder binder construction made from European Douglas fir timber. It had a height of 66 meters (with lightning arresters on the top 71 metres). Its structure was held together by steel pegs.

On 18 March 2002, its construction started with the excavation of the tower foundations; on 3 June 2002 building of its structure started. For this the lower elements of the framework construction were pre-assembled in pairs and then put in place. The missing diagonal elements were then added afterwards. On 21 June 2002, its structure was topped-out. At time of completion, Rottenbuch Radio Tower was the highest wooden tower in Germany and the fifth-tallest wooden structure in the world. It remained the tallest wooden structure in Germany until 2012, when a 100 metres tall wooden tower for Hannover-Marienwerder Wind Turbine was built.

In July 2020 a newspaper report said that the tower has to be demolished due to irreparable damage by ants. It was planned until 2022 to replace it by a new tower In December 2020 it was decided to realize the replacement tower as steel lattice structure. The construction of the 69 metres tall replacement tower started on May 14th, 2024 and in May 2025 it was topped-out.

The old wooden tower was demolished in spring 2026 piece by piece with a mobile crane.

== See also ==
- List of towers
- List of tallest wooden buildings and structures
