= Framework (building) =

Cancelled building project in Portland, Oregon, United States

General information
- Type: Mixed-use
- Location: NW 10th Ave. & Glisan St., Portland, Oregon, United States

Height
- Roof: 148 ft (45 m)

Technical details
- Structural system: Post-tensioned Pres-Lam Cross-laminated Timber (CLT) Rocking Walls, CLT floors over Glulam Beams and Columns
- Floor count: 12

Design and construction
- Architect: Lever Architecture
- Developer: project^, Home Forward, and Beneficial State Bank
- Structural engineer: KPFF Consulting Engineers
- Main contractor: Walsh Construction Company

Framework was a planned mixed-use building in Portland, Oregon, United States, that would have been located in the Pearl District neighborhood. Designed by Lever Architecture, it would have been the tallest timber building in North America, and was called the "nation's first high-rise building made of wood". This project was cancelled in 2018 due to a funding shortfall.

== Description ==
The Framework building was designed by architect Thomas Robinson. The timber material planned for the building was cross laminated timber (CLT) utilizing Pres-Lam rocking walls for lateral resistance. The architecture firm had planned to use CLT from D.R. Johnson Lumber Company from Riddle, Oregon. The building's number of stories had been given both as 12 and as 11. Construction was expected to begin in fall 2017.

The mixed-use building would have provided office space on floors two through six, and affordable housing may have been placed on floors seven through eleven.

== History ==
The project team won a $1.5 million grant from the USDA in September 2015 for participating in the Tall Wood Building Prize Competition.

The design phase included extensive fire, structural and acoustic testing. Building assemblies tested during this phase met the requirements of the Oregon Building Codes Division. Framework was approved by the Portland Design Commission in September 2016, and the construction permit for the project was approved by the state's Building Codes Division on June 6, 2017.

== See also ==
- Carbon12, another wooden building in Portland, Oregon (as of 2017, the tallest in the United States)
