= SS Runa =

Cargo ship

History
- Name: Eichberg (1944–45); Empire Consent (1945–49); Runa (1949–64); Karyatis (1964–68)
- Owner: August Bolten Wm. Miller's Nachfolger, (1944–45); Ministry of War Transport (1945); Ministry of Transport (1945–49); Glen & Co Ltd (1949–64); Seamasters Shipping Co (1964–68)
- Operator: August Bolten Wm. Miller's Nachfolger, (1944–45); Ministry of War Transport (1945); Ministry of Transport (1945–49); Glen & Co Ltd (1949–64); Seamasters Shipping Co (1964–68)
- Port of registry: (Nazi Germany) Hamburg (1944–45); (United Kingdom) London (1945–49); (United Kingdom) Glasgow (1949–64); Greece (1964–68)
- Builder: Van der Gissen
- Launched: 1944
- Identification: Code Letters GFSW (1945–64); United Kingdom Official Number 180848 (1945–64)
- Fate: Scrapped

General characteristics
- Type: Cargo ship
- Tonnage: 1,942 GRT; 964 NRT
- Length: 283 ft 1 in (86.28 m)
- Beam: 44 ft 3 in (13.49 m)
- Draught: 18 ft 4 1/2 in (5.60 m)
- Depth: 15 ft 8 in (4.78 m)
- Installed power: Compound steam engine
- Propulsion: Screw propeller

Runa was a 1,942 GRT cargo ship that was built in 1944 as Eichberg by Van der Giessen, Krimpen aan den IJssel, Netherlands for German owners. She was seized by the Allies in April 1945, passed to the Ministry of War Transport (MoWT) and renamed Empire Consent. In 1949, Empire Consent was sold into merchant service and renamed Runa. In 1964, she was sold to Greek owners and renamed Karyatis, serving until 1968 when she was scrapped.

== Description ==
The ship was built by Van der Giessen, Krimpen aan den IJssel. She was launched in 1944.

The ship was 283 feet 1 inch (86.28 m) long, with a beam of 44 feet 3 inches (13.49 m). She had a depth of 15 feet 8 inches (4.78 m) and a draught of 18 ft 4 1/2 in (5.60 m). The ship had a GRT of 1,942 and a NRT of 964.

The ship was propelled by a compound steam engine which had two cylinders of 16 9/16 inches (42.1 cm) and two cylinders of 35 7/16 inches (90.0 cm) diameter by 35 7/16 inches (90.0 cm) stroke. The engine was built by Verschure & Co Scheepswerk en Maschinenfabriek, Amsterdam.

== History ==
Eichburg was built for August Bolten Wm. Miller's Nachfolger, Hamburg. On 23 November 1944, she was damaged by a mine in the Baltic Sea. She was seized by the Allies in May 1945 at Bremerhaven, passed to the MoWT and renamed Empire Consent. She was placed under the management of Witherington & Everett. Her port of registry was changed to London. The Code Letters GFSW and United Kingdom Official Number 180848 were allocated.

On 11 May 1946, a fire broke out in Empire Consent's cargo whilst she was moored in the Alexandra Dock, Hull, Yorkshire. Six people were injured fighting the fire, which took over 24 hours to extinguish. In 1949, Empire Consent was sold to Glen & Co Ltd, Glasgow and was renamed Runa. In 1964, Runa was sold to Seamasters Shipping Co, Greece and was renamed Karyatis. She served until 1968, when she was scrapped in Hong Kong.
