= Eichberg Tower =

Coordinates: 48°8′1″N 7°51′57″E

The Eichberg Tower is an observation tower on the 369 m high Eichberg mountain above the city of Emmendingen. The tower platform sits 10 m above the surrounding oak forest, and its top over 17 mm making it the highest observation tower in the state of Baden-Württemberg.

The tower, created by an association of citizens formed in 1999, was handed over to the city of Emmendingen on September 17, 2005 and is now open to the public.

== Construction ==
The platform is made of oak and sits on six Douglas fir trunks which, together with an upper platform framework, form a pyramid shape. The stairway is cylindrical, made from sectional steel and structural steel fabric, with 240 oak steps.

== See also ==
- List of towers
