= Brück aerial testing facility =

Berlin facility

Coordinates: 52°12′14″N 12°45′56″E

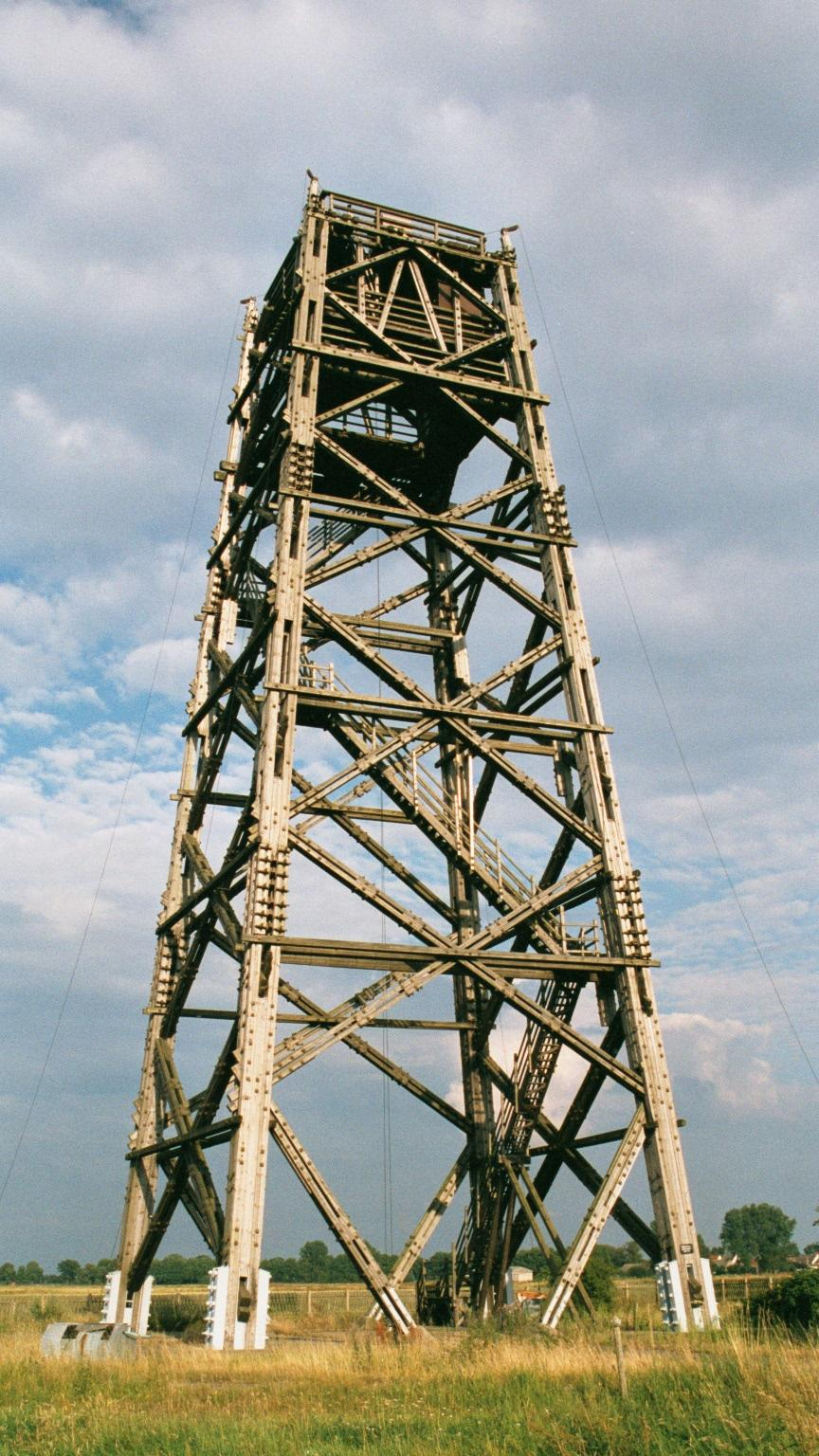
Brück aerial testing facility – Meßturm II

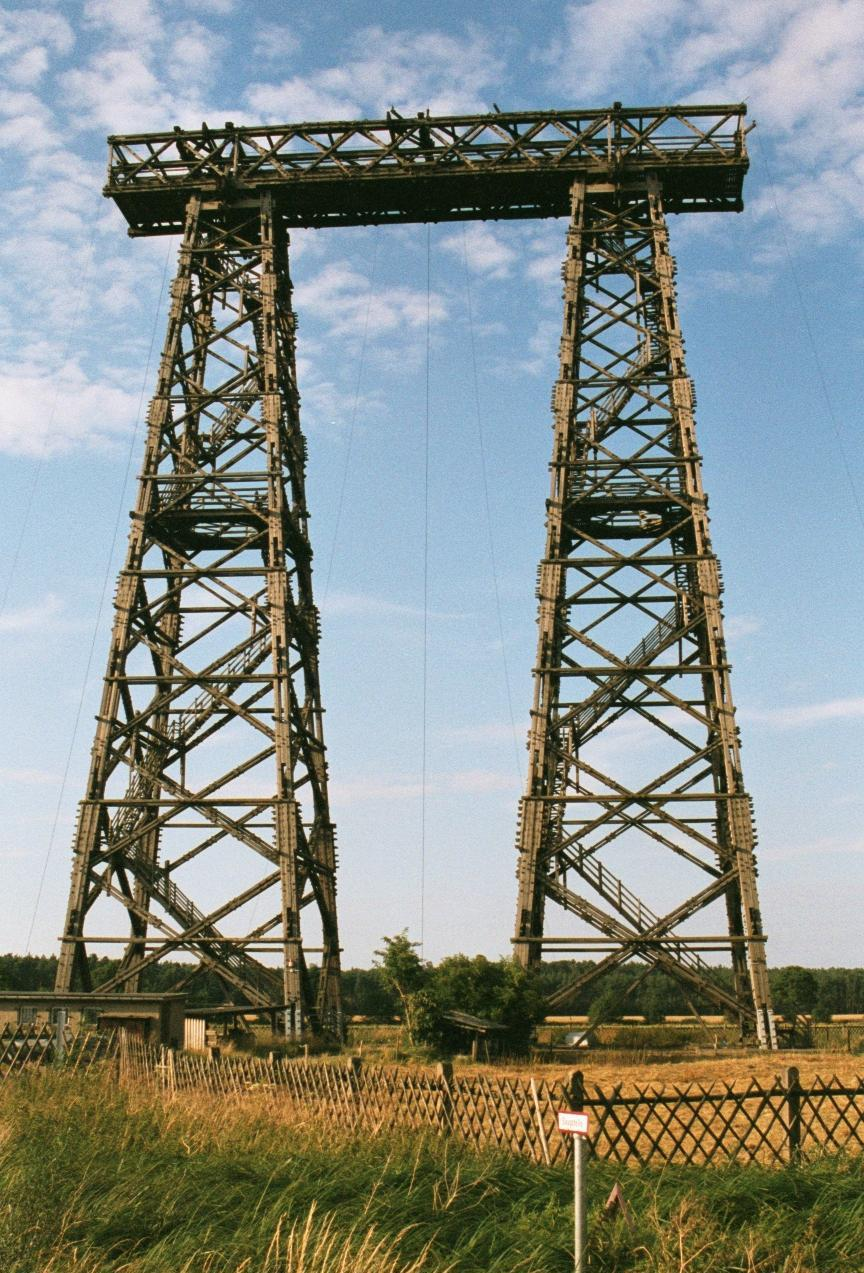
Brück aerial testing facility – Meßturm III

The Brück aerial testing facility is a facility for testing aerials at Brück, south of Berlin. It was established in 1939.

== Overview ==
On the Brück aerial testing facility there are two 54-metre-high (177 ft) wood-framework towers built in 1963, made without any metallic parts and used for mounting aerials to measure their characteristics. One of these towers, the Messturm III, consists of two towers connected by a bridge on top, while the other, the Messturm II, is from conventional design.

A third wood tower, the former Messturm I, which was built in 1958, was destroyed in a fire in 1979.

== See also ==
- List of towers
