= Jahrtausendturm =

Wooden tower in Magdeburg, Germany

Coordinates: 52.138°N 11.667°E

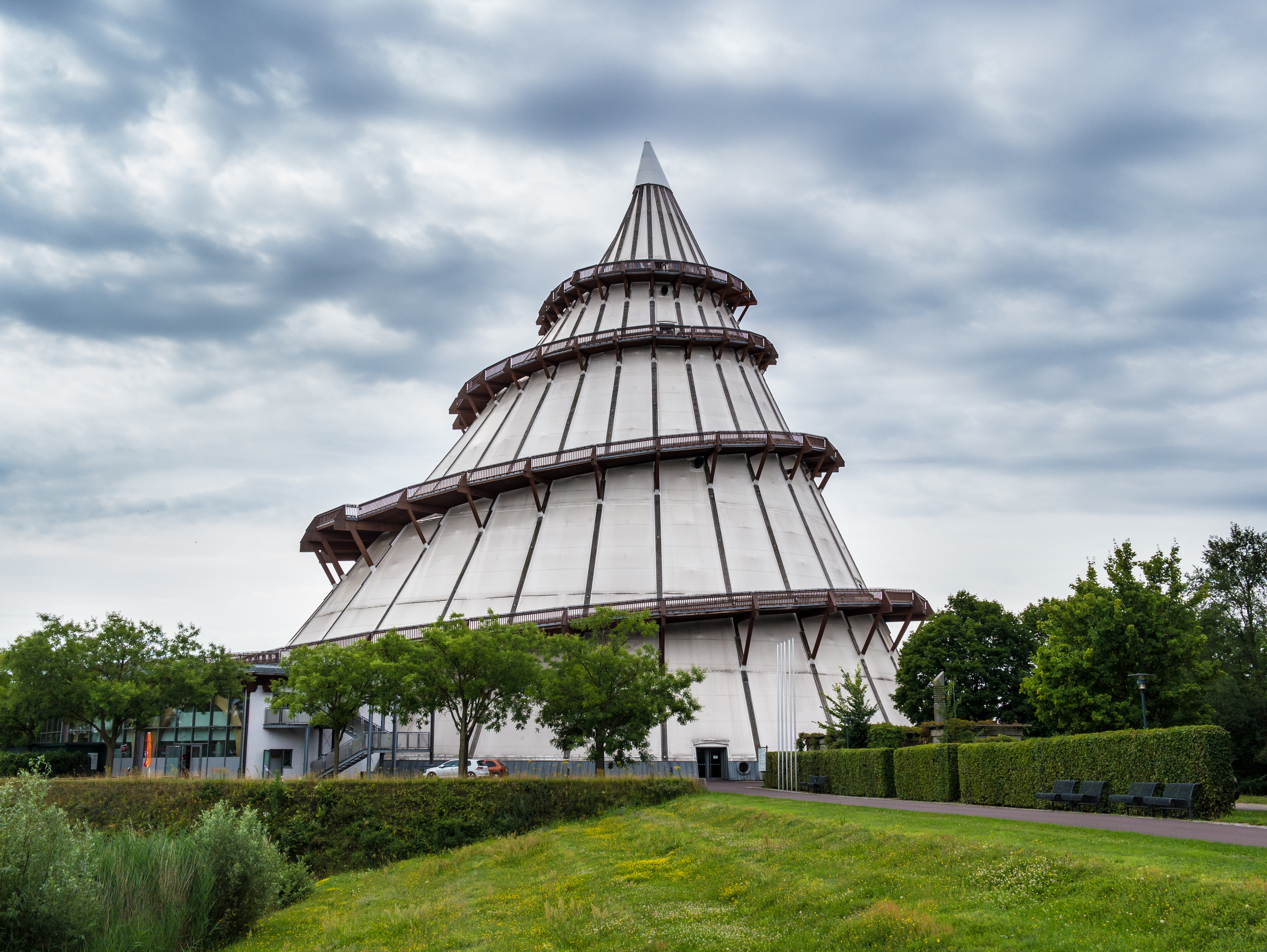
Jahrtausendturm

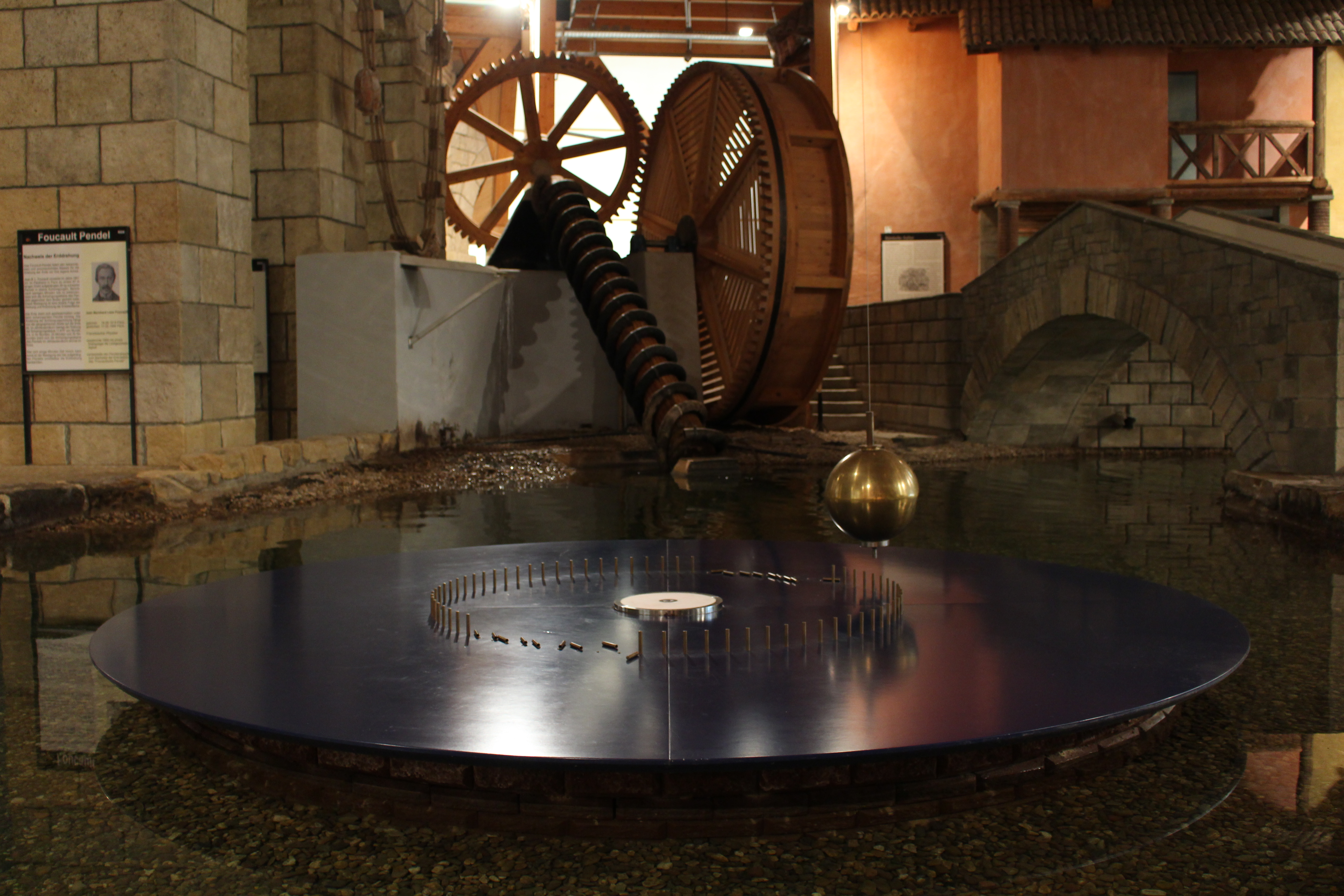
Foucault pendulum and Archimedes' screw (background)

Jahrtausendturm (German: millennium tower) is, at 60 metres (200 ft), one of the highest wooden towers in the world. It was established on the occasion of the Bundesgartenschau 1999 in the Magdeburger Elbauenpark in Magdeburg, Germany. The tower houses an exhibition on the development of sciences, which is supported by many descriptive experiments with which the visitor can interact. One notable example is a powerful telescope through which visitors can observe the distant clock-face on the Magdeburger cathedral.

== Construction ==
The intentionally inclined designed tower leads its visitor through an exhibit representing 6,000 years of human history. The tower has six floors, five of which comprise the history exhibit. The individual floors are accessible by means of an internal stairway, as well as a spiral wooden stair on the tower's exterior. The 8,000 square meter exhibition surface offers approximately 80 interactive experimental setups for the visitor to manipulate. In addition, the tower offers several hundred informational exhibits and diagrams. The exhibit is installed in chronological order. The Millennium Tower is in the Elbauenpark Magdeburg. Admission to the tower is included in the entrance price of the park.

== Floors ==
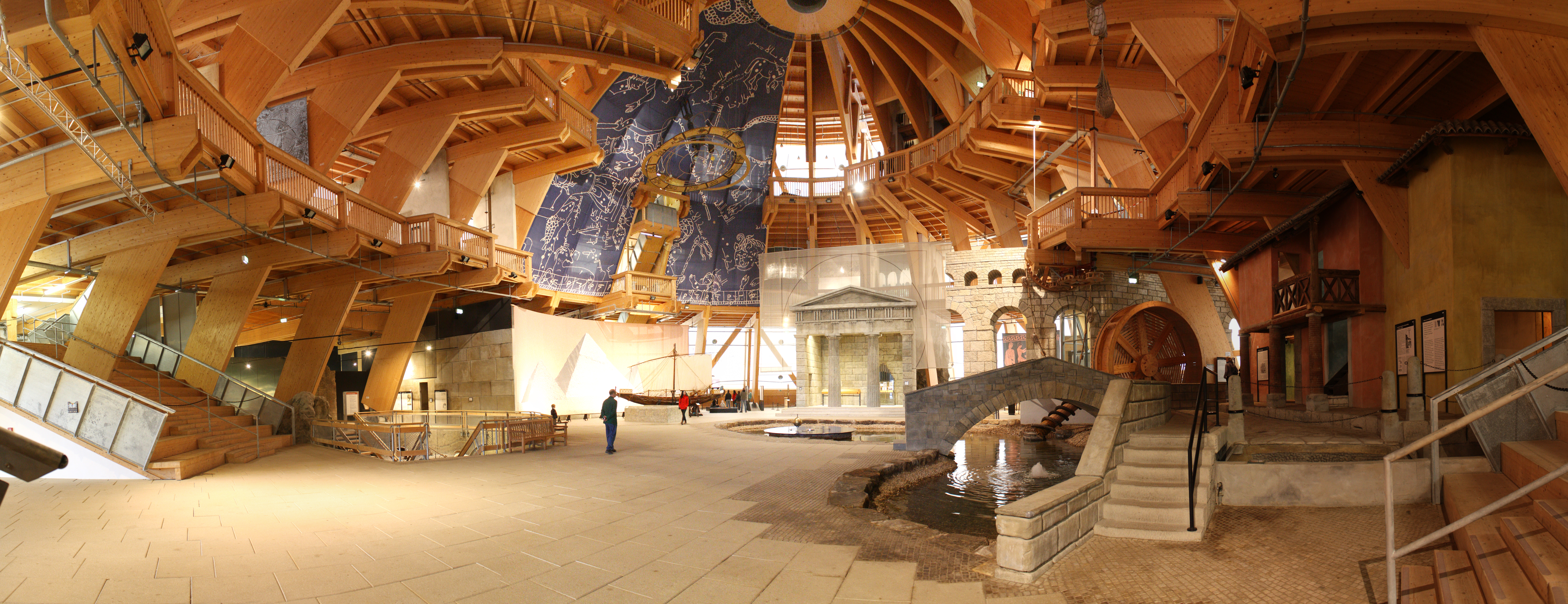
Interior view of the Jahrtausendturm

On the lowest floor one finds exhibits related to the earliest cultures and the birth of human history. The visitor will find (among other things) an accessible Ancient Egyptian dwelling, a grave chamber and a labyrinth. Exhibits are not limited to physical anthropology. The physical sciences and mathematics of earliest antiquity are described and represented in experiments, exhibits and diagrams.
The second floor concerns itself with the Middle Ages (500-1500). Here is represented antique world systems and medicine, simple machines and the science of early Arabia. Included in the interactive exhibits are pulley-blocks, a water wheel, and a human-powered impeller for pumping liquids.
The third floor is devoted to the knowledge of the Renaissance to early modern times (1500–1750). Here the visitor finds exhibits on mechanics, vacuum, magnetism, mathematics, alchemy, medicine and conceptions of world change. Important wars, the important journeys of discovery and major inventions (e.g., the printing press, the telescope) are among the main topics.
The fourth floor shows the period 1650-1859. The floor is divided into the levels 4.1, 4.2 and 4.3. Topics include medicine and chemistry, biology and sensory perception, as well as optics. Topics here include electricity, radio engineering, caloric theory, fixed star parallax, Doppler effect, space and time, as well as genetic engineering and the nuclear energy. Numerous experiments illustrate the topics.
The fifth floor concerns itself with modern research in the natural sciences and medicine. Emphasis is on the general topics "microcosm" and "macrocosm".
The sixth floor houses the observation platform.

== Data ==
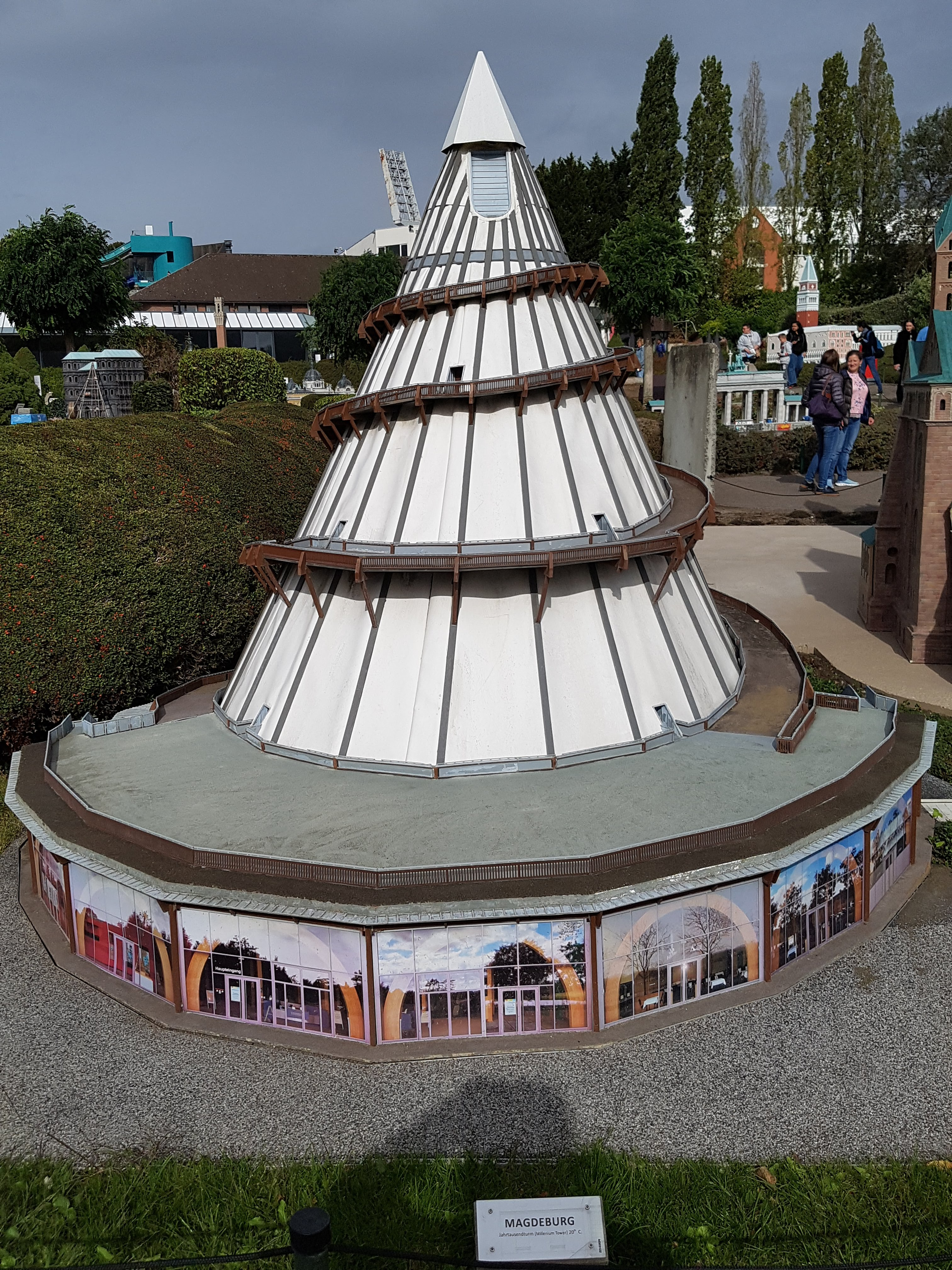
Miniature of Jahrtausendturm at Mini-Europe

- height: 60 m;
- oval base: 70x50 m;
- wood used in construction: 5,500 m³;
- surrounded space: 61.000 m³;
- tarpaulin: 5000 m²;
- exhibition area: 8,030 m²;
- height of the observation deck: 43 m;
- steps to the observation deck: 243;
- length of the exterior ramp: 450 m

== See also ==
- List of towers
