= Puls (content network) =

- Germany
- Broadcast area: Bavaria
- Frequency: DAB: 11D

Programming
- Language: German
- Format: Alternative

Ownership
- Operator: Bayerischer Rundfunk (BR)
- Sister stations: Bayern 1 Bayern 2 Bayern 3 BR-Klassik; BR24; BR24live; BR Heimat; BR Schlager

History
- First air date: 15 May 2013
- Last air date: 13 January 2026

Links
- Website: www.br.de/puls

Puls ("Pulse") is a German, youth-oriented content network owned and operated by Bavarian public broadcaster Bayerischer Rundfunk (BR). It is youth-oriented and makes heavy use of social media and also promotes bands and artists from Bavaria and is present at festivals, clubs and concerts. The network's YouTube channels have more than 2 million subscribers and 850 million views combined.

== Puls-Radio ==
Puls-Radio replaced BR's previous youth station on3-radio on 15 May 2013. Like its predecessor it was digital only and 20% of the tracks that aired were from bavarian bands and artists. Compared to on3-radio, the amount of moderated sections was increased. For the first two years, its program was also simulcasted on Bayern 3 from Friday 10pm until Saturday at 5am. From August 2015 until December 2018, Bayern 3 aired Pulses moderated Program Spätschicht ("late shift") from 10pm until midnight.

The moderated sections during business days were decreased over the following years, from three (between 6am and 10am, between 12am and 4pm and between 4pm and 8pm) in 2020 to a singular one (between 2pm and 6pm) by 2024. The rest of the program was mostly music that was interrupted by news bulletins (that were taken over from Bayern 3). The music that aired was mostly new music that were outside of the mainstream, usually out of the genres urban, electronic music and hip-hop.

From 2025 onwards, all moderated sections were dropped, including the news bulletins. The BR largely kept quiet about the reasons. In the wake of the politically mandated reduction in ARD radio stations as part of the Reformstaatsvertrag, Bayerischer Rundfunk initially announced in July 2025 that it would discontinue Puls-Radio in 2027 with its digital sister channels BR Schlager, BR24live and BR Verkehr. The Puls brand is supposed to be kept going. On autumn of 2025, it was announced that Puls-Radio would be discontinued at the end of 2025, though later the shutdown date was set to the 13 January 2026 at 10am. The final song that was aired on Puls-Radio was Die Dunkelheit darf niemals siegen ("the darkness shall never win") by the band Frittenbude feat. Jörkk Mechenbier.

Puls-Radio was available via DAB, DVB-S, DVB-C, a web livestream and also a dedicated mobile app. A proposed launch on FM in 2018 using the frequencies of BR-Klassik never happened as BR didn't deem it necessary thanks to the size of its DAB network and success of Bayern 3 with younger audiences.

== Television shows ==
Every Thursday at 11:45 PM on BR Fernsehen, Puls used to broadcast the half-hour magazine Puls - Das Qualitätsfernsehen deines Vertrauens (the quality television of your trust), in which Sebastian Meinberg and Ariane Alter have contributed articles from the categories "We have to talk", "Give it a try", "We celebrate it" as well as "End with fun" present. In addition, the moderators handed over an interesting gift for each show in "The Gift". The episodes and individual contributions were also published online, in part, even before their broadcast on television. Since 2018, the program is only broadcast on the Internet.

Other broadcasts of Puls are Startrampe (launching ramp), UMZUG !, as well as Woidboyz on BR Fernsehen and ARD-alpha.

== Logos ==
First logo in use since 2013

Second logo of BR Puls getting introduced since 2024
