= BR Verkehr =

- Germany
- Broadcast area: Bavaria
- Frequencies: DAB: 7D (Lower Bavaria); 8C (Middle Franconia); 10A (Lower Franconia, Swabia, Upper Bavaria); 10B (Upper Franconia); 12D (Upper Palatinate)

Programming
- Language: German
- Format: Traffic reporting

Ownership
- Operator: Bayerischer Rundfunk (BR)
- Sister stations: Bayern 1 Bayern 2 Bayern 3 BR-Klassik; BR24; BR24live; Puls; BR Heimat; BR Schlager

History
- First air date: 1 December 2002
- Former names: BR Traffic News

Links
- Website: br.de/unternehmen/inhalt/technik/digitalradio-dab-verkehr100.html

BR Verkehr ( formerly : BR Traffic News ) is a 24-hour DAB channel owned and operated by Bayerischer Rundfunk (BR) which broadcasts traffic information to road users using computer speech synthesis. WDR's VERA used the same system. BR Verkehr, along with several other public radio stations, is scheduled to close by December 31, 2026.

== Program ==
BR Verkehr is broadcast as part of the Bayerischer Rundfunk over its DAB+ platforms. The schedule consists almost entirely of traffic information received by the BR traffic department from police, ADAC or other media. All traffic information is broadcast using a female, computer-generated voice. There is no live on-air voice.

BR also transmits traffic data on other channels using the TPEG (Transport Protocol Experts Group) format, a further development of the widely used TMC system.

== Reception ==
The channel can be received on BR's DAB+ network. From 1 September 2005 to 9 January 2012, BR Verkehr was also available via DVB-S in the ARD Digital channel package throughout Europe. German cable providers carried the channel until 9 January 2012.

It is also possible to receive complete traffic information by calling 01805/333066.

On 9 January 2012 distribution of BR traffic via DVB-S and DVB-C end. An EPG message informed viewers that the station is now exclusively distributed via DAB +. The channel will close by December 31, 2026.
