= Andreas Bachmann =

German journalist

- Born: 1974 (age 51–52); Aschaffenburg
- Occupation: Journalist
- Children: 2

Andreas Bachmann (born 1974 in Aschaffenburg) is a German journalist. He is editorial director of the editorial department Rundschau (BR24) and Landesberichte on BR television and an election expert for Bayerischer Rundfunk. In the past, he was, among other things, moderator of the ARD political magazine report Munich as well as moderator and editorial director of the BR political magazine Kontrovers.

== Professional career ==
After graduating from Aschaffenburg's Friedrich-Dessauer-Gymnasium, Andreas Bachmann studied political science in Mainz and Munich. He took his first journalistic steps as an intern and freelancer in the Hanau local editorial team of the Frankfurter Rundschau.

In 1997, he began working as a reporter for Bayerischer Rundfunk (BR), also for the ARD political magazine report München. From 2004 to 2009 he was a state parliament correspondent for Bavarian Television. In 2007 he took turns hosting the BR political magazine Kontrovers with Ursula Heller. Since then he has also moderated various special programs on Bavarian television, especially programs about elections. From November 2009 to August 2020, Andreas Bachmann was the editorial director of Kontrovers, and from April 2016 to August 2020 he also served as moderator of the ARD political magazine report München.

In September 2020, he took over the management of the Rundschau and Landesberichte editorial team at Bayerischer Rundfunk, which means that he is responsible for the editorial management of all news programs in the Rundschau family (renamed BR24 in 2022) as well as the digital offer BR24 and the editorial management of Abendschau and Abendschau - Der Süd. Despite his new role as editorial director, Bachmann is still active as a presenter of special programs on BR television and as a BR election expert. In particular, since taking over the management of the Rundschau, he has also moderated special editions of the Rundschau (Rundschau-Extra, since 2021 under the name BR24 extra).

== Political engagement ==
Before moving to Munich in 1997, Bachmann was politically active in Aschaffenburg. From 1993 to 1997 he chaired the Junge Union in Aschaffenburg and, at the age of 21, became chairman of the CSU local branch Aschaffenburg-Damm.

== Awards ==
In 2011 Andreas Bachmann was awarded the Bavarian Constitutional Medal in silver. This was justified by his reporting on Bavarian politics.

== Personal life ==
Bachmann is married and has two sons.
