= Bayern 2 plus =

Germany
- Broadcast area: Bavaria

Programming
- Language: German

Ownership
- Operator: Bayerischer Rundfunk (BR)

History
- First air date: 1 April 2005
- Last air date: 28 January 2015

Bayern 2 plus was a German, public radio station owned and operated by the Bayerischer Rundfunk (BR). A sister station of cultural program Bayern 2, it was a digital-only station and was not available via FM broadcasting. It was replaced by BR Heimat on 2 February 2015.
