= Fernmeldeturm Nürnberg =

Telecommunication tower in Bavaria, Germany

Coordinates: 49°25′34″N 11°02′20″E

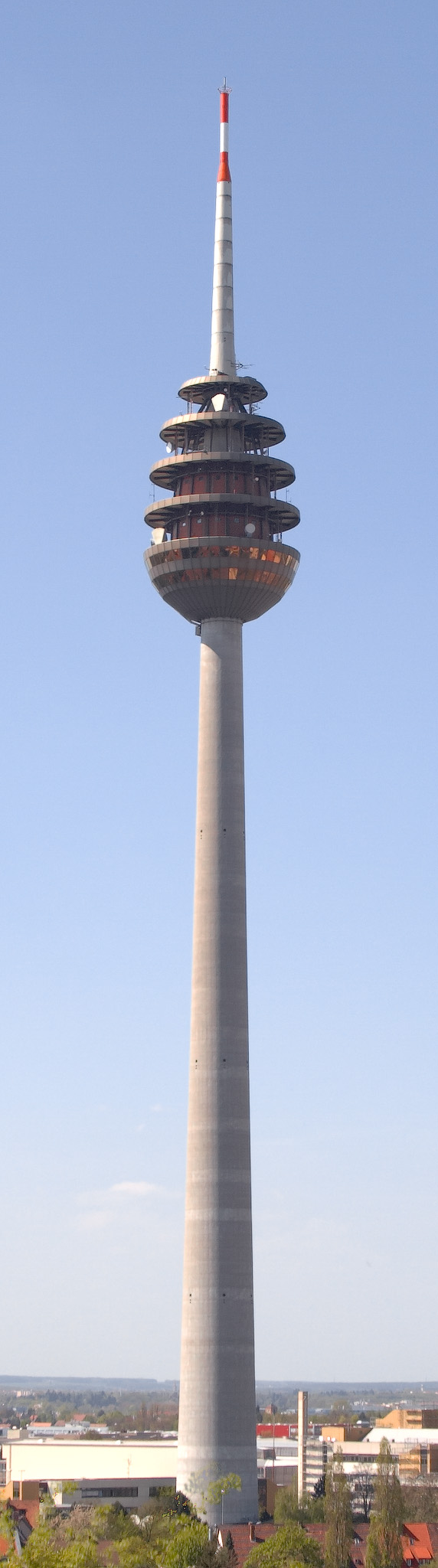
The Fernmeldeturm Nürnberg

The Fernmeldeturm Nürnberg, the tallest structure in Bavaria, is a telecommunication tower in Nuremberg, southern Germany. Also called the Nürnberger Ei ("Egg of Nuremberg") because of its egg-shaped tower basket in a height of 185 metres, it is 292 metres high and was built between 1977 and 1980 according to blueprints by architect Erwin Heinle.

The tower basket accommodates transmission mechanisms for Frequency modulation, DAB, UMTS, pager, amateur radio and a microwave radio relay link and – closed since 1991 – a rotating restaurant and a prospect platform. Responsible operator is the DFMG Deutsche Funkturm (German radio tower) GmbH, a subsidiary of Deutsche Telekom based in Münster. From 22 January 2003 to 4 April 2003 the Nürnberg telecommunication tower also served for the spreading of the program of megaradio on mediumwave frequency 945 kHz. For this a wire antenna was strung along the tower shaft, from the top of the tower to the roof of an operating building near the tower.

Since July 2009 a 360° Panoramacamera shows the view over Nuremberg from 194 metres.

== Forerunner ==
From 1927 to 1969, broadcasting programs in medium wave were emitted by the Transmitter Nuremberg-Kleinreuth at the former Rundfunkstraße (Broadcast street) 24. This transmitter was laid to the radio emitting station of the Bayerischer Rundfunk (Bavarian Broadcasting Company) on 15 September 1969 on the Dillberg mountain (see: Dillberg transmitter) where the broadcasting programs of the Bavarian Broadcasting Company are still emitted.

== Technical data ==
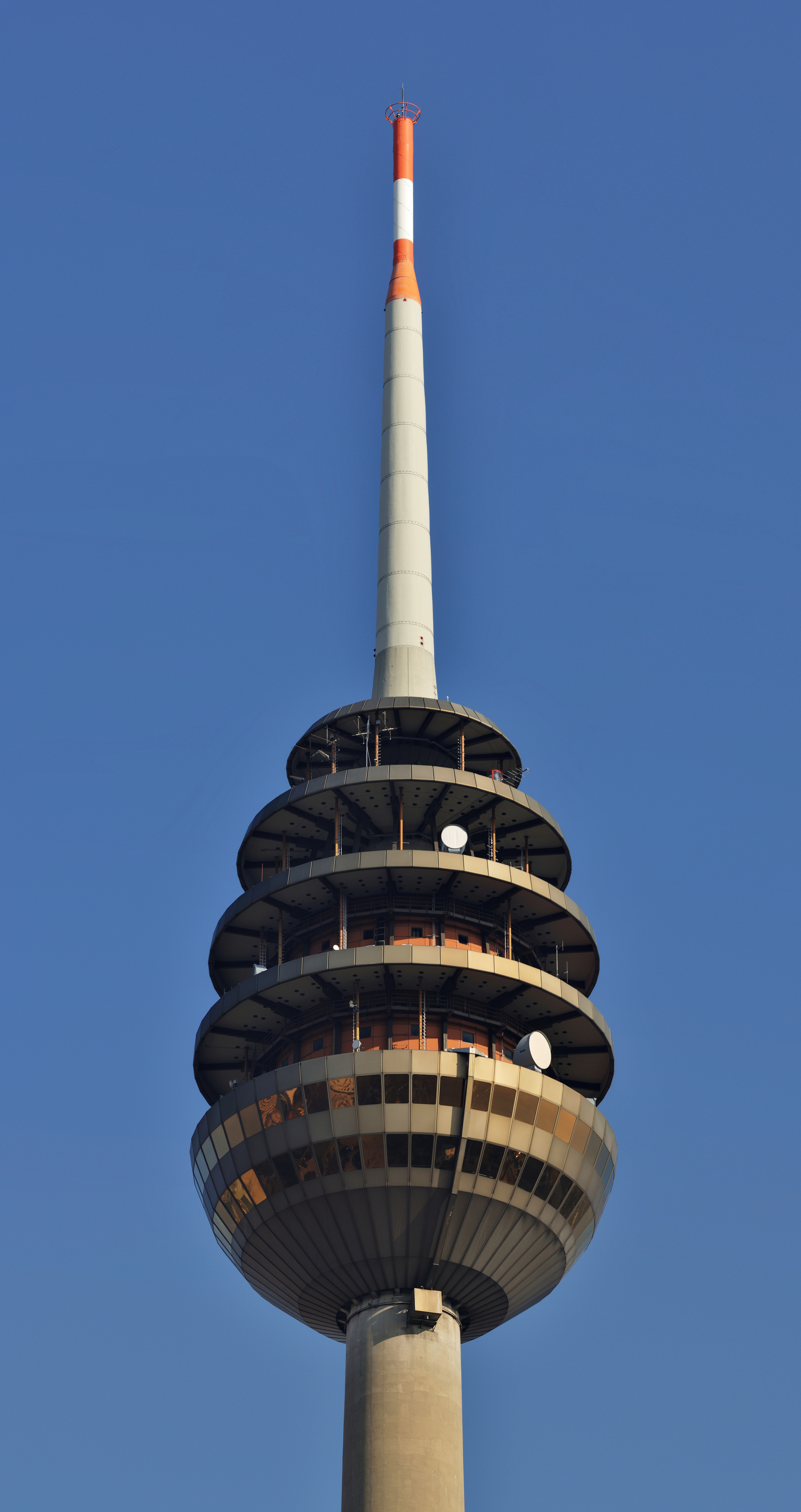
The basket of the tower which gave it the epithet Nürnberger Ei (Egg of Nuremberg)

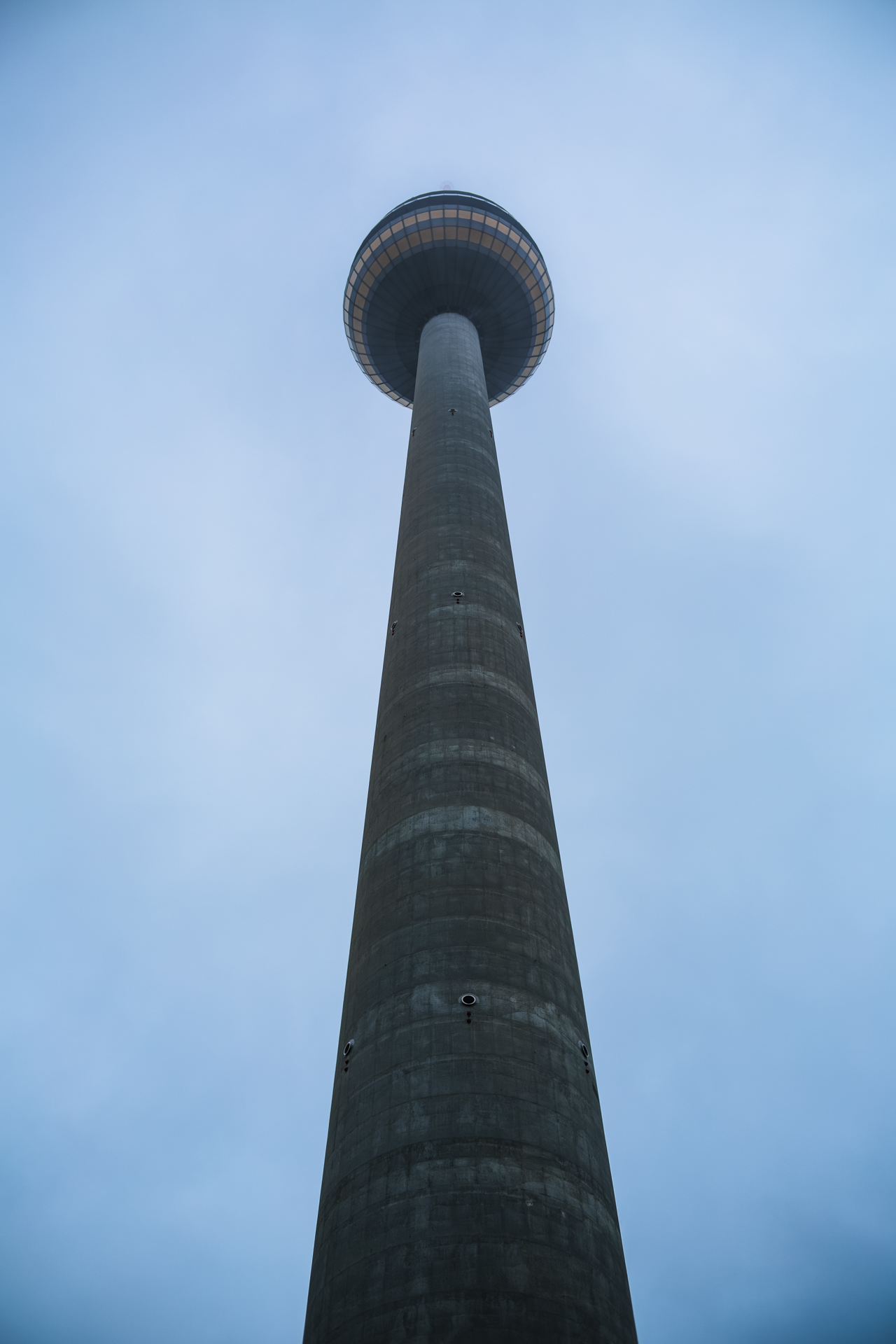
Fernmeldeturm Nürnberg from ground level

- Total height: 292.80 m / 960 ft. (as of 9 April 2005)
- Total weight: 23,000 t
- Maximum diameter of the tower basket: 32.00 m /105 ft.
- Height of the tower basket: 49.70 m / 163 ft.
- Height of the restaurant floor: 189 m / 620 ft.
- Stairs to the prospect platform: 1,170
- Stairs and staves to the top: 1,455
- Lift velocity (up to 30 persons): 7 m/s / 23 ft/sec
- Material lift velocity (up to 13 persons): 2 m/s / 7 ft/sec
- Construction time: 12 July 1977 (laying of the foundation stone) to 8 August 1980 (official opening)

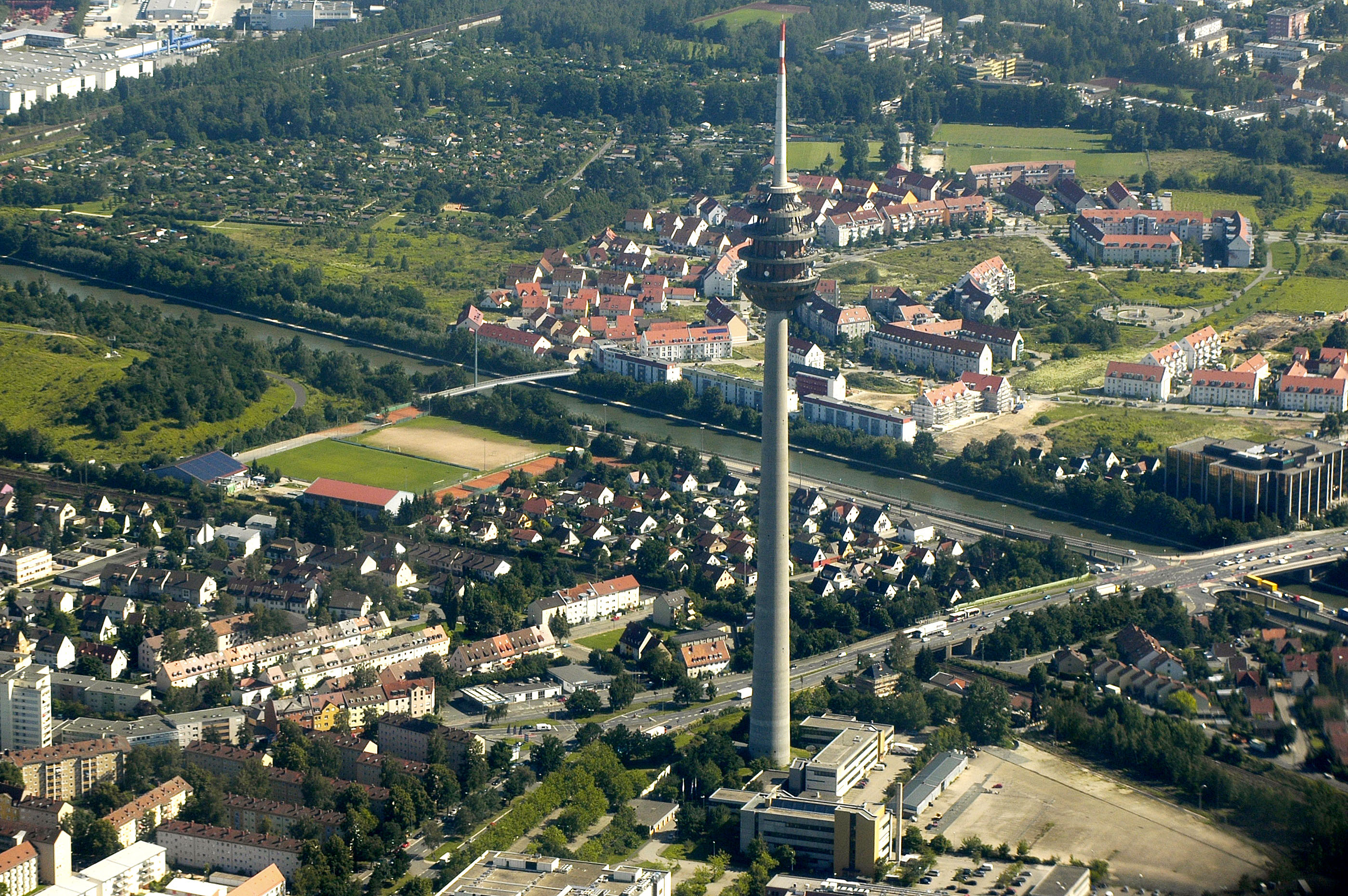
Aerial photo of the Fernmeldeturm Nürnberg

== DVB-T-Channels from the Fernmeldeturm Nürnberg ==
Channel	Programs in the bouquet	ERP	Polarisation
E6	Das Erste, Phoenix, arte, Eins Plus	25 kW	vertical
E34	ZDF, 3sat, KI.KA/ZDF Dokukanal, ZDF Digitext (data service)	50 kW	vertical
E40	ProSieben, Sat.1, Kabel 1, N24	20 kW	vertical
E59	Bayerisches Fernsehen, BR-alpha, SWR Fernsehen BW, hr-fernsehen	50 kW	vertical
E60	Tele 5, Eurosport, Franken TV, MonA TV	20 kW	vertical
E66	RTL Television, RTL II, Super RTL, VOX	20 kW	vertical

== See also ==
- List of towers
- List of masts
- German Wikipedia article on Fernmeldeturm Nürnberg
