= On3-radio =

on3-radio

Germany
- Broadcast area: Bavaria

Programming
- Language: German

Ownership
- Operator: Bayerischer Rundfunk (BR)

History
- First air date: 8 May 2008
- Last air date: 15 May 2013

on3-radio was a German, public radio station owned and operated by the Bayerischer Rundfunk (BR). It used to air a youth-oriented program. It first aired on 5 May 2008, replacing Bavarian Open Radio. On 18 April 2013 it was announced (and officially confirmed on 8 May) that on3-radio would be replaced by a new radio station called PULS on 15 May 2013. The name PULS also acts as a replacement for the previous umbrella brand on3.
