= Dillberg transmitter =

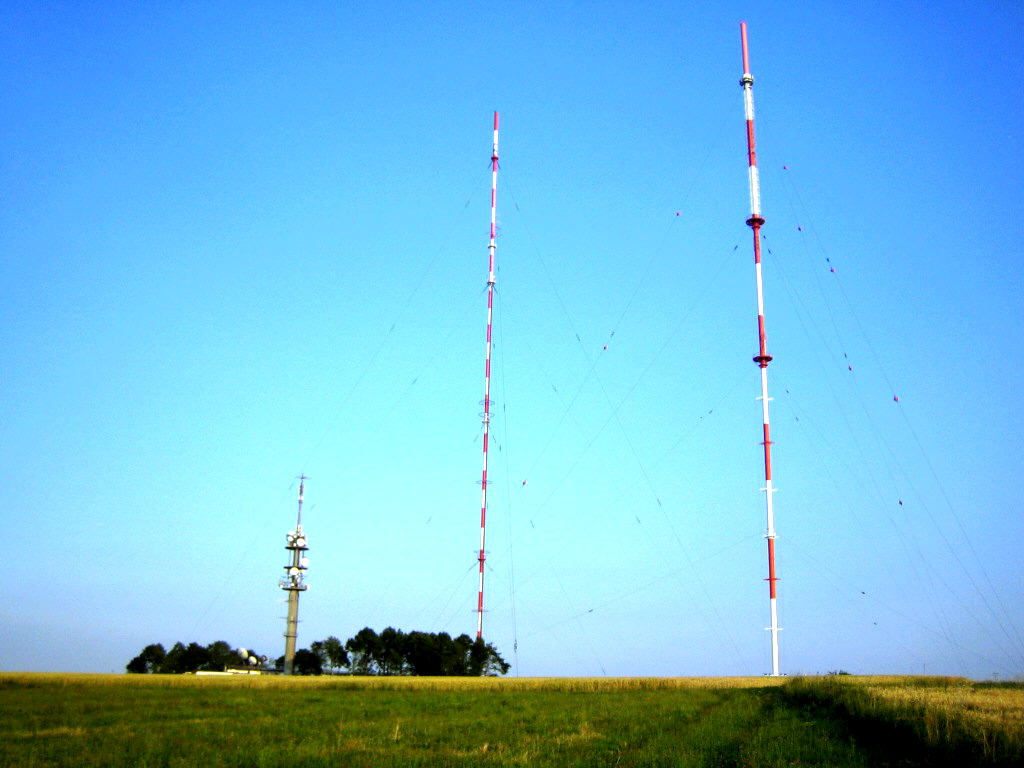
- Dillberg transmitter
- Location: Neumarkt in der Oberpfalz
- Mast height: 198 m (650 ft)
- Coordinates: 49°19′27″N 11°22′56″E
- Built: 1955
- Local TV service: Bavarian Broadcasting Company

Dillberg transmitter is a transmitting facility of the Bavarian Broadcasting Company (German: Bayerischer Rundfunk) on the 595-metre-high Dillberg mountain west of Neumarkt in der Oberpfalz, Bavaria, Germany. Dillberg transmitter went into service in 1955 for serving the area of Nuremberg with TV and FM radio programmes from a 198-metre-tall guyed mast.

== Medium wave transmissions ==
In 1969 Dillberg transmitter took over the medium wave transmissions from Nuremberg-Kleinreuth transmitter, which was shut down in this year. As the mast of Dillberg transmitter is grounded, it was equipped with a cage antenna for this purpose. The frequency of the transmitter was, until 1978, 800 kHz and then changed to 801 kHz in 1978 after the waveplan of Geneva went in service. Although it was possible to use also the frequency 909 kHz for Dillberg transmitter, the Bavarian Broadcasting Company decided to run it on 801 kHz forming with Transmitter Ismaning a single frequency network, as operating on 909 kHz would have required an expensive extension of the antenna as directional radiation would be required at night time for this frequency. The Mediumwave Transmitter has been officially shut down on September 30, 2015 (together with the Würzburg 729 kHz and Ismaning 801 kHz Transmitters), according to Guidelines of the "Commission for Budget Requirement of public Broadcast (KEF)" and also due to the fact that there remained only minimal auditorium for the "Bayern Plus" Program via Mediumwave, which is primarily distributed digitally today - Bavaria-wide - via DAB+ (Bavarian Bouquet), within Broadband Cable Networks and Satellite (DVB-S), as well as via Internet.

A panorama of Dillberg, 2013

== Directional radio ==
In 1986 a 62-metre-tall telecommunication tower was built nearby for directional radio services. A second mast for TV transmission with a height of 231 metres was built in 1991. This mast is, like the old mast, grounded and equipped with a cage antenna for medium wave broadcasting. After completion of this mast, the old mast is used only as a backup antenna mast.

== Short wave transmitter ==
In 2004 a short wave transmitter working in DRM-mode was installed. On May 30, 2005 the analogue TV transmitters were switched off after digital transmitters took over their task.

== Control centre ==
At Dillberg transmitter there is the control centre for transmitter operation of Northern Bavaria of Bavaria Broadcasting Company. From this installation, the radio and TV transmitters of Bavarian Broadcasting Company, which are not always staffed, are remotely controlled.

== Frequencies of Dillberg transmitter ==
| Sendername | Frequency | ERP |
|---|---|---|
| BAYERN 1 | 88,9 MHz | 25 kW |
| BAYERN 1 | 104,5 MHz | 5 kW |
| BAYERN 2 | 92,3 MHz | 25 kW |
| BAYERN 2 | 102,5 MHz | 10 kW |
| BAYERN 3 | 97,9 MHz | 25 kW |
| BAYERN 4 KLASSIK | 87,6 MHz | 25 kW |
| B 5 AKTUELL | 102,0 MHz | 25 kW |
| ANTENNE BAYERN | 100,6 MHz | 25 kW |
