= Stadelheim =

Stadelheim may refer to:

- Stadelheim Prison in Munich's Giesing district
  - Cell 70 of Stadelheim Prison
- Stadelheim Transmitter, a medium-wave broadcast transmitter in Munich-Stadelheim, built 1926 and last used around 1933
