= Space Night =

German television program

Space Night (full title: space night - All-tag nachts) is a German television program in the early night/morning hours each day. It is a mixture of chill-out-music and images of the Earth as seen from space interspersed with informative broadcasts. It was started by the Bayerischer Rundfunk (BR) in 1994 and is now broadcast by ARD-alpha.

== Structure ==
Space Night's structure consists of several different sub-programs. In any given month, on any given weekday, the programs will be the same. In the next month, the programs will change, but again stay the same for the same weekdays. There are no broadcasts during Friday and Saturday nights.

Space Night itself does not have any opening or closing credits; only the sub-programs may do. Recognizing that a program is part of Space Night is done in two ways:

1. some programs will show a text overlay reading "space night" in the bottom right corner
2. there are no regular program forecasts injected between the programs during Space Night.

The sub-programs are never all part of any single Space Night. Instead the programs from the beginning of a Space Night are repeated at the end, so that some episodes of a program may be broadcast twice during one Space Night. If a program would continue to run longer than the Space Night itself, it will be interrupted in the middle.

- Alpha-Centauri (science program by BR-alpha, presented by physicist Prof. Harald Lesch)
- Alpha bis Omega (Alpha to Omega) (discussions about theology between the physicist Harald Lesch and the theologian Thomas Schwartz. This program is almost only broadcast during Space Night itself)
- Die Erde erwacht (The Earth awakes) (Pictures of cities and their inhabitants' doings during morning time; no audio comments)
- Earth Views (Satellite pictures of several Earth regions with interruptions by computer animations; no audio comments but music; total of ten episodes)
- Jazz in Space (pictures from space; no audio comments but Jazz music)
- Lesch & Co. (discussions between the physicist Harald Lesch and his colleague Wilhelm Vossenkuhl about philosophy)
- Moonwalks (pictures of excursions across the Moon)
- Space Art (paintings from the art genre called Space Art; no audio comments but music; some episodes do not have the text overlay "space night" but "space art" instead)
- Space Cowboys (pictures of missions of NASA's programs Project Mercury, Project Gemini and Apollo program; no audio comments but music; additional text overlay showing information about each mission like the starting day, crew info, name of modules, duration, special notes, etc.)
- Was sucht der Mensch im Weltraum? (What does man seek in space?) (rerun of the 1968 television series featuring Heinz Haber)
- Waternight (pictures of coral reefs; no audio comments but music)
- New Frontiers (stations on the way to the International Space Station (Project Mercury, Project Gemini, Apollo-Program, Space Shuttle, Mir); no audio comment but electro music)

== History ==
Space Night started in 1994 as a replacement of the test cards which were broadcast on BR at night until this time. The idea originated in the fact that the German satellite ASTRO-SPAS (see STS-80) had recorded many hours of video footage in space. The BR received this footage, edited the material and added downtempo spherical music.

As BR did not want to show the same pictures 7 days a week, both NASA and ESA as well as the German Aerospace Center were addressed. They offered more hours of footage from in and around space, which were thus included.

== Cult status and music ==
The broadcast quickly turned into a cult: At raves in the mid-1990s it wasn't unusual to show the images of Space Night on big TV-screens. Early in the morning after the rave it was often used to calm down, especially from 1996 and later, as Space Night's sound changed through the musical guidance by Alex Azary (a European chill-out-DJ), who provided a more electronic background music. This was a logical step that originated from Alex Azary. He headed the Club XS in Frankfurt where "chill out nights" started in 1990, supported by spherical music. Alongside, pictures of Space Night were shown, albeit the playback was a little bit slower than in the original program. The images did fit well to the then new music-genre and Alex thought it would be a good idea to show it to the people at BR. A meeting in Munich followed where he could convince them to try something new. A few years later, individual songs were created by composer Marc Engelhard.

The compositions are also available as separate CDs, the mixdown starting from the album Space Night II is done by the German music label Elektrolux. In the meantime, twelve CD-albums with music to the television series have been published, with three of those clearly differing in musical style. While Space Night Vol. 1 is an album featuring pop music, Space Night Vol. 10 features Jazz music and Space Night Vol. 12 is a double CD with classical music. A DVD titled Best of Earth-Views is also available.

== Problems ==
After a change in tariffs by the GEMA, BR stated they would not want to continue Space Night starting in January 2013, due to the drastically increased royalties. Hence the series was ended on January 8, 2013. Numerous viewers engaged BR to continue Space Night by using GEMA-free music. The station decided to undo the cancellation, first by rerunning older episodes starting on February 25, 2013 and to later broadcast new episodes starting in autumn of 2013. To accomplish this, BR will use music with Creative Commons licensing, encouraging their viewer to upload their favorites.

The restart was scheduled for November 1, 2013. It had to be postponed to November, 15th, because NASA was not able to provide the necessary graphical material, due to the 2013 United States federal government shutdown.

== Special broadcasts ==
=== Moon landing ===
On the 25th anniversary of the first human landing on the Moon the original version of the broadcast of the ARD was shown at the exact time of the original airing.

=== Perry Rhodan ===
On the 40th anniversary of the Perry Rhodan series in 2001 there was a "Perry Rhodan-Space Night". Cover art by the artist Johnny Bruck (who produced the cover artwork for Perry Rhodan) was shown with modern techniques to animate still pictures, there were galaxies, planets, spaceplanes, men and aliens - a visual journey through the Perry Rhodan universe with the familiar music of Space Night. Following the broadcast, which was repeated for several weeks, a DVD with the title Space Night presents: Perry Rhodan 40th Anniversary - Special Sci-Fi Edition and a double album with the music was created.
