= BR-Radltour =

Bavarian annual cycle tour

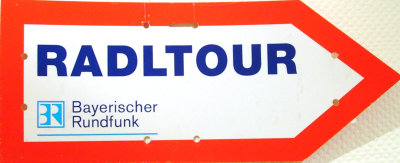
Road sign BR-Radltour

The BR-Radltour (German pronunciation: [ˌbeːʔɛɐ ˈʁaːdl̩tuɐ]) is an annual bicycle tour for recreational bicycle riders that was established in 1990. It is organized by the Bavarian Broadcasting Corporation (Bayerischer Rundfunk) which is therefore represented in the name of the tour. Radl is the Bavarian vernacular for bicycle (German: Fahrrad). The inventor of the BR-Radltour, Thomas Gaitanides retired in 2013 after his 23rd tour.

Normally the BR-Radltour has six leads through the Bavarian countryside. It is no competition but an event for people who prefer healthy sport and the community spirit with fellow cyclists.

The BR-Radltour boasts to be the largest bicycling event in Germany. This is only accurate for the number of participants for the whole tour, which is mostly between 1,000 and 1,300. Bicycle tours that also allow one-day participants might have several thousand more.

== Registration and participation ==
The tour is announced in April on the internet pages of the Bavarian Broadcasting Corporation. Participation is only possible after an application and winning a vacancy in the following draw. Cyclists who sneak their way into the tour will be expelled. One-day participation was re-introduced in 2016.

The tour can handle some 1,000 to 1,300 cyclists of which only a limited proportion of pedelecs are admitted. The number of participants depends on the number of available overnight quarters.

== Schedule ==
The BR-Radltour generally starts on the first Saturday after the beginning of the summer holiday in Bavaria. This is in the last week of July or the first week of August. The tour ends on the following Saturday.

== The tour ==
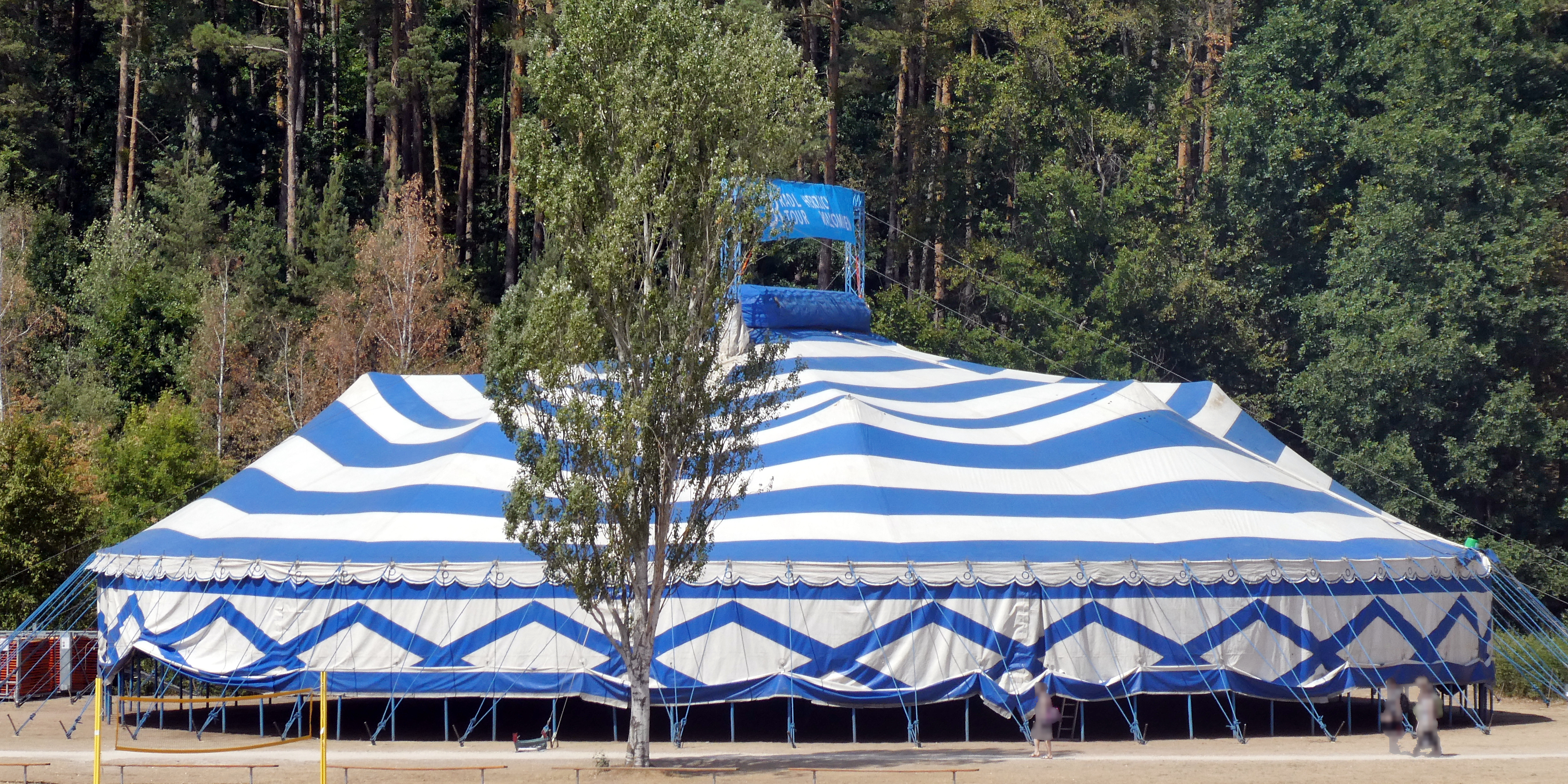
Tent for a lunch break (Allmannsdorf, 2022)

=== Sequence of events ===
The first day of the tour is reserved for the check-in. The German railways provide several special trains for the cyclists.

The tour itself starts one day later. One lead has a length of 60–100 km (40–60 mi). There are one or two water breaks and a longer break for lunch. The tour has six or seven leads, so it will arrive at its destination on the following Friday. The next morning the cyclists return home, mostly on special trains.

Every evening, including the final one, an open-air concert with disco takes place on the local fairground, mostly with well-known international bands. These events are free and open to the public, as far as space is available.

=== Service and support ===
The cyclists stay overnight in sports halls on mattresses that were borrowed from the police or army.

The tour is supported by the "Allgemeiner Deutscher Fahrrad-Club" (ADFC), a German association of hobby cyclists. The ADFC provide a mobile workshop for fast bicycle repairs. The most important supporter is the "Technisches Hilfswerk" (THW) that transports the luggage and the mattresses for the overnight quarters and prepares the quarters (mostly gym halls). "Adelholzener Alpenquellen", a supplier of mineral water, sponsors the drinks for the cyclists.

=== BR-Radltour 2015 ===
The 26th BR-Radltour started on 2 August 2015 in Weilheim and ended in Mellrichstadt (Lower Franconia). It covered 483 kilometres (300 miles).

lead	date	start	1st water break	lunch break	2nd water break	destination	length
1st	3 August	Weilheim	Utting am Ammersee	Jesenwang		Friedberg	80 km (50 mi)
2nd	4 August	Friedberg	Thierhaupten	Donauwörth		Wemding	90 km (56 mi)
3rd	5 August	Wemding	Dittenheim	Spalt		Heilsbronn	75 km (47 mi)
4th	6 August	Heilsbronn	Neuhof an der Zenn	Veitsbronn		Höchstadt an der Aisch	80 km (50 mi)
5th	7 August	Höchstadt an der Aisch	Schlüsselfeld	Wiesentheid	Sommerach	Volkach	78 km (48 mi)
6th	8 August	Volkach	Geldersheim	Münnerstadt		Mellrichstadt	80 km (50 mi)

=== BR-Radltour 2016 ===
The BR-Radltour 2016 started on 30 July 2016 in Marktredwitz and passed through Neustadt an der Waldnaab, Neunburg vorm Wald, Viechtach and Vilshofen. It ended on 5 August 2016 in Burghausen, Altötting. In 2016 there were only 1000 participants, and the tour covered only 430 km (267 mi.)

=== BR-Radltour 2017 ===
The BR-Radltour 2017 started on 29 July 2017 in Gunzenhausen. After a round-trip to Ellingen and back the tour passed through Nördlingen, Gersthofen, Landsberg and Memmingen. It ended on 4 August 2017 in Sonthofen. There were 1100 participants, and the tour covered 460 km (286 mi.)

=== BR-Radltour 2018 ===
The BR-Radltour 2018 started on 28 July 2018 in Mühldorf am Inn. The tour passed through Landshut, Bad Gögging, Berching, Baiersdorf and Kitzingen. It ended on 3 August 2018 in Marktheidenfeld after covering 480 km (298 mi.). The weather was dry and very hot, with only a short rainshower. 1100 participants joined the tour.

=== BR-Radltour 2019 ===
The BR-Radltour 2019 started on 27 July 2019 in Bad Staffelstein with 1100 participants. It began with a round tour to Seßlach and back before passing through Hollfeld, Lauf an der Pegnitz, Schwandorf, Deggendorf and ending in Bad Füssing. On the last day there was another round tour to Bad Birnbach and back. The Radltour was one day longer than usual because it was the 30th tour. It covered 567 km (352 miles) in total.

The two round tours were open for another 1100 participants.

=== BR-Radltour 2020/21 ===
The BR-Radltour 2020 was planned as a six-day tour from Cham to Lauf an der Pegnitz. It had to be cancelled due to the COVID-19 pandemic. The 2021 tour could not take place for the same reason.

=== BR-Radltour 2022 ===
After two years of a forced hiatus, the BR-Radltour 2022 was announced as "finally cycling and celebrating again".

lead	date	start	1st water break	lunch break	2nd water break	destination	length
1	31 July	Cham	Cham	Furth im Wald		Cham	81.0 km (50.3 mi)
2	1 August	Cham	Konzell	Bogen		Landau an der Isar	80.4 km (50.0 mi)
3	2 August	Landau	Dornwang	Ergolding	Langenbach	Freising	89.6 km (55.7 mi)
4	3 August	Freising	Petershausen	Odelzhausen		Aichach	83.3 km (51.8 mi)
5	4 August	Aichach	Königsmoos	Gaimersheim	Denkendorf	Dietfurt	95.8 km (59.5 mi)
6	5 August	Dietfurt	Großhöbing	Brombachsee		Gunzenhausen	82.5 km (51.3 mi)

=== BR-Radltour 2023 ===
lead	date	start	1st water break	lunch break	2nd water break	destination	length
1	30 July	Murnau am Staffelsee	Schwaiganger	Penzberg		Murnau	80 km (50 mi)
2	31 July	Murnau	Königsdorf	Valley		Bruckmühl	91 km (57 mi)
3	1 August	Bruckmühl	Neubeuern	Bernau am Chiemsee	Bad Adelholzen	Traunstein	90 km (56 mi)
4	2 August	Traunstein	Seebruck	Bernau a.Ch.	Bad Adelholzen	Traunstein	82 km (51 mi)
5	3 August	Traunstein	Kirchweidach	Neuötting	Hebertsfelden	Pfarrkirchen	91 km (57 mi)
6	4 August	Pfarrkirchen	Arnstorf	Aldersbach	Winzer	Vilshofen	86 km (53 mi)

=== BR-Radltour 2024 ===
On the BR's 75-year jubilee, the BR-Radltour 2024 went through all seven Regierungsbezirke of Bavaria.

lead	date	start	1st water break	lunch break	2nd water break	destination	length
1	28 July	Landau an der Isar; Lower Bavaria	Postau	Rottenburg an der Laaber		Geisenfeld	94 km (58 mi)
2	29 July	Geisenfeld; Upper Bavaria	Obermühle	Rennertshofen		Donauwörth	83 km (52 mi)
3	30 July	Donauwörth; Swabia	Tagmersheim	Titting		Berching	94 km (58 mi)
4	31 July	Berching; Upper Palatinate	Ezelsdorf	Schnaittach		Pegnitz	99 km (62 mi)
5	1 August	Pegnitz; Upper Franconia	Veilbronn	Memmelsdorf		Ebern	96 km (60 mi)
6	2 August	Ebern; Lower Franconia	Sand am Main	Prichsenstadt	Scheinfeld	Neustadt an der Aisch; Middle Franconia	104 km (65 mi)

=== BR-Radltour 2025 ===
lead	date	start	1st water break	lunch break	2nd water break	destination	length
1	3 August	Bad Neustadt an der Saale	Ostheim vor der Rhön	Fladungen	Bischofsheim	Bad Neustadt	86 km (53 mi)
2	4 August	Bad Neustadt	Maria Bildhausen	Bad Kissingen		Hammelburg	86 km (53 mi)
3	5 August	Hammelburg	Gemünden am Main	Rothenbuch	Heimbuchenthal	Miltenberg	107 km (66 mi)
4	6 August	Miltenberg	Kreuzwertheim	Waldbüttelbrunn		Ochsenfurt	93 km (58 mi)
5	7 August	Ochsenfurt	Weigenheim	Obernzenn		Herrieden	86 km (53 mi)
6	8 August	Herrieden	Gunzenhausen	Pappenheim	Wellheim	Neuburg an der Donau	110 km (68 mi)

=== BR-Radltour 2026 ===
lead	date	start	1st water break	lunch break	2nd water break	destination	length
1	2 August	Nördlingen	Wassertrüdingen	Dinkelsbühl		Nördlingen	90.5 km (56.2 mi)
2	3 August	Nördlingen	Balderschwang	Zusmarshausen	Stadtbergen	Königsbrunn	107.8 km (67.0 mi)
3	4 August	Königsbrunn	Erpfting	Schongau		Oberammergau	96.7 km (60.1 mi)
4	5 August	Oberammergau	Bichl	Gmund am Tegernsee	Au bei Bad Aibling	Rosenheim	113.7 km (70.6 mi)
5	6 August	Rosenheim	Maxlrain	Ebersberg		Dorfen	84.3 km (52.4 mi)
6	7 August	Dorfen	Winhöring	Simbach am Inn		Bad Füssing	103.8 km (64.5 mi)

== See also ==
- Cycle Oregon

== Literature ==
- Lutz Bäucker: BR-Radltour – Unsere Lieblingstouren: Mit Karten und Tipps, vielen Fotos und Anekdoten. Die schönsten Tourenbeschreibungen, Bilder und Geschichten aus 25 Jahren BR-Radltour. Bruckmann 2014, ISBN 978-3-7654-8763-7 (in German)
