= Hühnerberg =

Hühnerberg may refer to:

- Hühnerberg (Swabia), a mountain of Bavaria, Germany
- Hühnerberg (Lommersdorf), a mountain in the Ahr Hills, in the Eifel region, Germany
- Hühnerberg (Kirchsahr), a mountain in the Ahr Hills, in the Eifel region, Germany
- Hühnerberg (Taunus), a mountain in the Rheingau-Taunus-Kreis, Taunus region, Hesse, Germany

== See also ==
- Hünerberg, a mountain in the Hochtaunuskreis, Taunus region, Hesse, Germany
- Hüenerberg a peak of the Alpstein massif
