= Bayern mobil =

- Germany
- Broadcast area: Bavaria

Programming
- Language: German

Ownership
- Operator: Bayerischer Rundfunk (BR)

History
- First air date: 1 January 1998
- Last air date: 1 September 2008

Bayern mobil was a German, public radio station owned and operated by the Bayerischer Rundfunk (BR) which was on-air from 1 January 1998 to 31 August 2008 as part of the DAB pilot project in Bavaria.

== Programming ==
The music range of Bayern mobil was wide and went from oldies of the 60s to current chart hits. Most of the songs were in English, German, French and Italian. The list of titles was compiled by a dedicated editorial team.

Bayern mobil was automated and aired the news from Bayern 3 hourly from 7 a.m. to 10:30 p.m. In addition, there were traffic and weather reports every half hour.

At irregular intervals, programmes were organized in which the listeners could request music titles by telephone or e-mail. Announcements of these broadcasts could be read in the radiotext and were read out in the weather and traffic block.

== Termination ==
Bayern mobil ceased broadcasting at 8 a.m. on 1 September 2008 after its last song I Believe by Joana Zimmer. The station was immediately replaced by Bayern plus.
