= Hausen, Greding =

Hausen
- Ortsteil of Greding
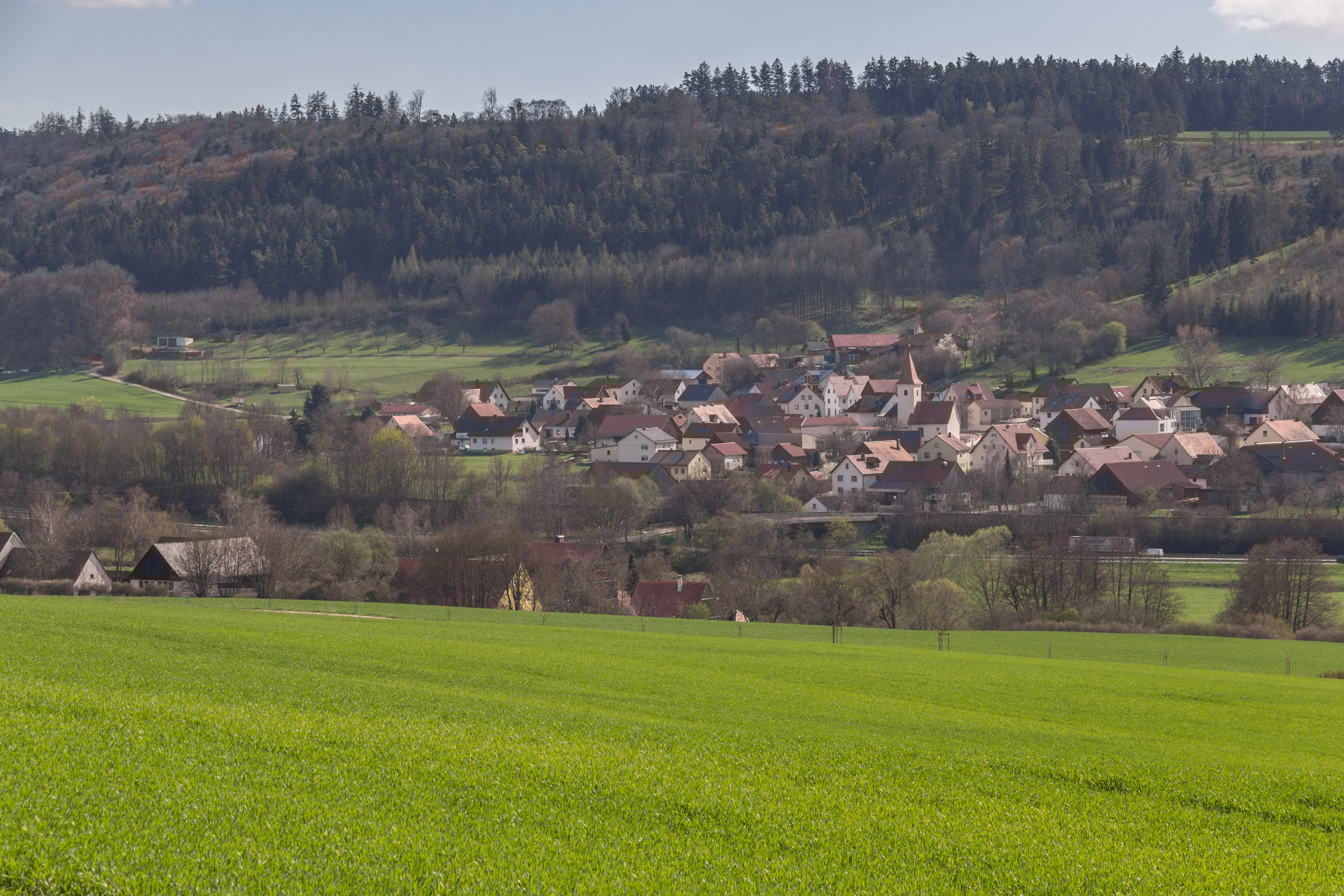
- Interactive map of Hausen
- Location within Germany Location within Bavaria
- Coordinates: 49°03′35″N 11°19′14″E
- Country: Germany
- State: Bavaria
- Admin. region: Mittelfranken
- District: Roth
- Town: Greding
- Elevation: 397–466 m (1,302–1,529 ft)

Population (2019)
  - Total: 163
- Time zone: UTC+01:00 (CET)
  - Summer (DST): UTC+02:00 (CEST)
- Postal codes: 91171
- Dialling codes: 08463

Hausen (German pronunciation: [ˈhaʊzn̩]) is a village in the town Greding in the district of Roth in Middle Franconia in Bavaria.

== Location ==
The small village on the Schwarzach and in the Altmühl Valley Nature Park. Hausen was a breakpoint on the Greding-Roth Railway. With the construction of the highway, it was necessary after the breakpoint direction Greding to lead the railway line under the motorway bridge on the other side of the highway and then swung back in a wide arc back to the original route. The bridge was widened during the construction of the strip in 1970 and demolished in 1972 after the line was abandoned.

== History ==
At the end of the 8th century, place names ending with "-hausen" stop. Therefore, a development is to be expected before. In documents, it appears in the 12th century. The seat of the gentlemen of Hausen should have been in the town center. In 1250 Count Gebhard von Hirschberg donated the so-called "Grafenhof zu Husen" to the Hospital of the Teutonic Order in Ellingen. The connection with the knights is also occupied for later. In 1496 Hans Zenner, judge of Neustadt, sold the castle to Hans von Schafhausen. The lords of Jahrsdorf were wealthy in place.

In 1638 it was established that in the course of the Thirty Years' War eight homesteads had already burned down In the course of the secularization, the lower Hochstift and in it Greding with houses to the Grand Duke Archduke Ferdinand III. of Tuscany and 1806 to Bavaria and in it to the district court Greding. 1809 Hausen was merged with Mettendorf and Greding to a tax district. After two years, this was dissolved again.

In 1935, two properties were moved to the other side of the Schwarzach to Petermühle to make room for the construction of the new A9.

With the Bavarian district reform came Hausen, from 1 January 1972, a district of the city Greding, with this on 1 July 1972 from the disbanded district Hilpoltstein in the newly formed district of Roth.

=== Population development ===
- 1818: 168 Inhabitants
- 1846: 171 Inhabitants
- 1856: 171 Inhabitants
- 1864: 185 Inhabitants (184 Hausen, 1 Petermühle)
- 1867: 212 Inhabitants
- 1875: 203 Inhabitants
- 1885: 185 Inhabitants
- 1900: 189 Inhabitants (175 Hausen, 14 Petermühle)
- 1925: 185 Inhabitants (174 Hausen, 11 Petermühle)
- 1950: 208 Inhabitants (193 Hausen, 15 Petermühle)
- 1961: 171 Inhabitants (163 Hausen, 8 Petermühle)
- 1970: 188 Inhabitants (182 Hausen, 6 Petermühle)
- 1978: 188 Inhabitants
- 1987: 196 Inhabitants

== Church of St. Peter and Paul ==
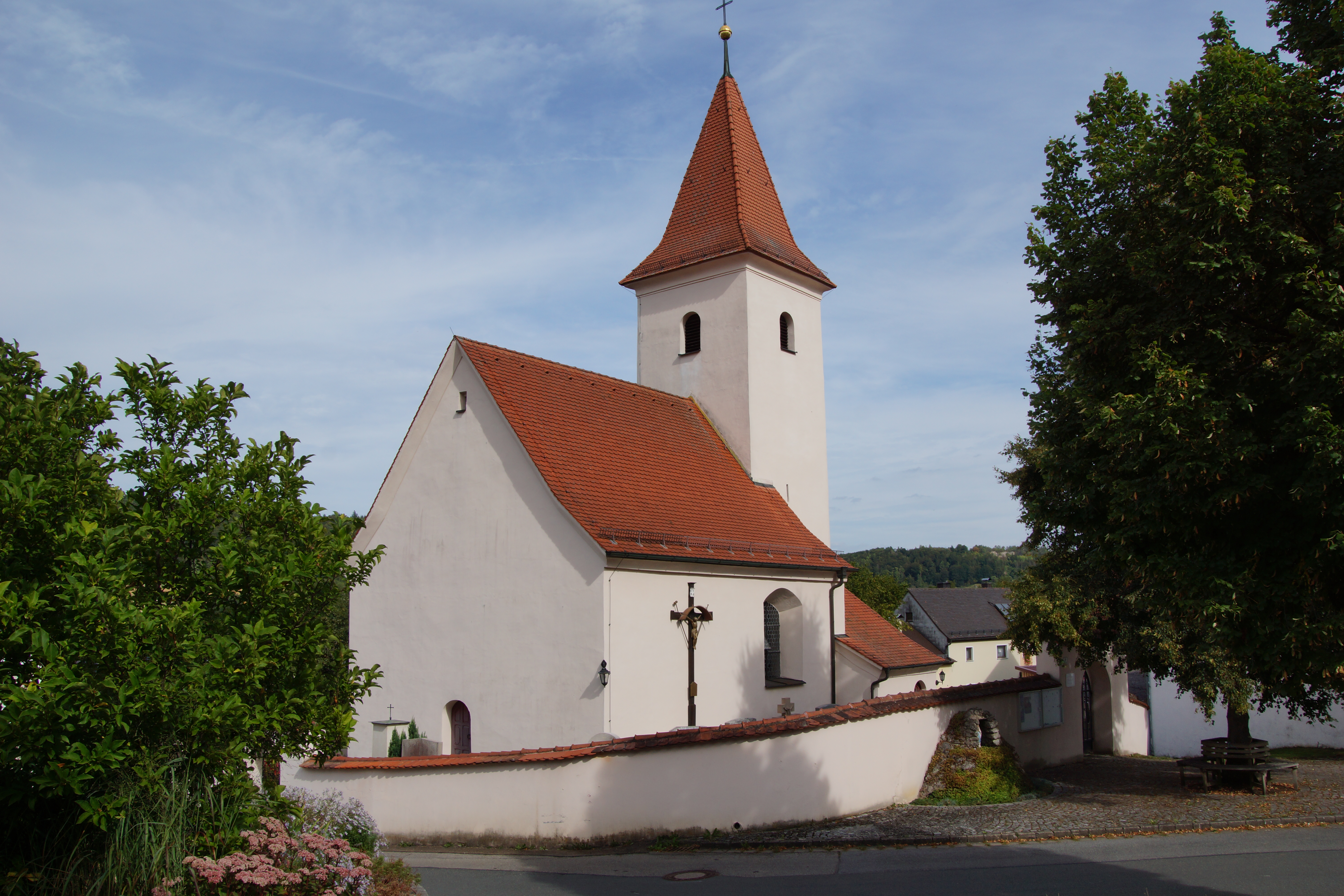
Church St. Peter und Paul

The catholic local church with the Patrozinium "St. Peter and Paul "is a branch of the parish Greding, deanery Roth-Schwabach, diocese Eichstätt. 152 Catholics live in the village.

=== History ===
In 1689, the previous church was rebuilt in Baroque style on the orders of Prince-Bishop Hofbaumeister Jakob Engel. By Engels Palier Johann Baptist Camesino, the upper part of the tower was rebuilt; the longhouse of the building has been raised. In the 17th century, the church got a white ceiling, from this time comes the high altar. The pulpit was made in 1689 by Gredinger carpenter Matthias Seidl. Two church bells were cast in 1701 by Ursus Laubscher in Ingolstadt. Two more were purchased in 2001. The side altars were acquired after its secularization from the monastery Rebdorf. The company Ambos from Berching renovated the interior of the church and two new windows were installed.

From the predecessor building is a paving grave stone in the floor of the church. This applies to the memory of Magdalena Griebel von Stockau, the daughter of Kaspar Griebel von Stockau. According to inscription, she died on Andrea day 1613.

=== Organ ===
The organ was built in 1914 by the company Strebel. It has a manual and a pedal, four registers, superoktavcoupling. The control of the pipes takes place with pneumatic pocket shop.

I Hauptwerk
Principal	4′
Gedeckt	8′
Dulciana	8′

Pedal
Bourdonbass	16′

- Normalkoppeln: I/P; Superoktavkopplung

== Sonstiges ==
- In Hausen is the waterworks of Zweckverbandes for water supply of the Jura-Schwarzach Thalach group. It serves to supply 68 places in 7 communities in 3 government districts.
- Every year in Hausen a village festival (volunteer fire department / 15 August) and a Schafkopftunier instead.
- The northeastern nature reserveKuhbachtal bei Hausen

== Societies ==
- Dorfverein Hausen with the football department
- Freiwillige Feuerwehr Hausen
- KLJB Hausen

== Traffic ==
The state road 2227 leads past the village. Through the town runs the A 9 between Munich and Nuremberg, a bridge connects the two halves of the village.
