= Melodien der Berge =

- English: Melodies of the Mountains
- Created by: BR
- Starring: Michael Harles
- Opening theme: Melodien der Berge
- Country of origin: Germany

Original release
- Network: Das Erste
- Release: 1999

Melodien der Berge (Melodies of the Mountains) is a popular German speaking television program broadcast by Bayerischer Rundfunk. The show features traditional culture with the presenter and guests often wearing tracht; each show includes volksmusik mixed with alpine landscape views of Upper Bavaria and Upper Austria alongside heartfelt stories from people in the various regions, as well as cuisine which usually features traditional dishes from the featured area. Melodien der Berge started in 1999 and is presented and produced by Michael Harles.

In the Autumn and Winter months the program is broadcast from an indoor cabin set referred to as 'Kaming'schichten' which features various music performances of the volksmusik genre. During the Christmas period, artists perform carol music and the set is decorated for the festive season.

The television programme Countryfile, broadcast in the United Kingdom is an equivalent programme, featuring wildlife, culture and traditions throughout rural Britain. Guests and presenters often wear traditional Country Clothing; and is shown throughout the year.

== See also ==
- List of German television series
