= Büttelberg =

Mountain in Germany

Highest point
- Elevation: 530 m (1,740 ft)
- Isolation: 2.1 km (1.3 mi) to Sandberg
- Coordinates: 49°24′53″N 10°22′21″E

Geography
- Location: Bavaria, Germany

Büttelberg is a 530 m high, forest-covered mountain of Bavaria, Germany. It lies approximately 3 km south of Marktbergel. Since 1952 a broadcasting tower belonging to the Bayerischer Rundfunk is located on the mountain.
