= Adelholzener Alpenquellen =

Largest mineral spring in Bavaria, Germany

Adelholzener Alpenquellen GmbH
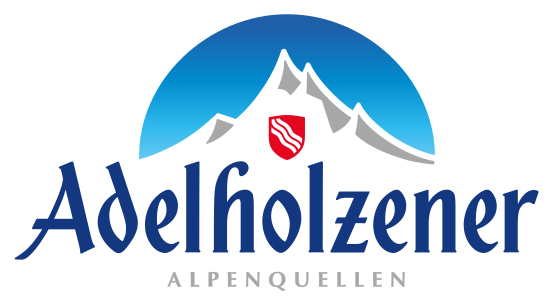
- Company type: GmbH
- Industry: Bottled water
- Founded: Bad Adelholzen, Siegsdorf in 1849 (177 years ago)
- Founder: Georg Mayr
- Headquarters: Bad Adelholzen, Siegsdorf
- Key people: Peter Lachenmeir, Franz Demmlmair, Stefan Hoechter (Managing directors)
- Number of employees: 580 (2020)
- Website: www.adelholzener.com

Adelholzener Alpenquellen GmbH is the largest mineral spring in Bavaria and is situated in Bad Adelholzen, a district of Siegsdorf. The largest and only shareholder is the Covenant of the Merciful Sisters of St. Vincent de Paul and the company bottles around 580 million mineral water products every year.

== History ==
Around the year 280 AD, according to legend, the spa of Bad Adelholzen was discovered by the Roman preacher St. Primus. On his return to Rome, he was captured along with his brother Felicianus by soldiers of Emperor Diocletian and killed. The name of the healing spring is still traced back to the Roman martyr. According to the legend of the saints, Primus, in addition to teaching people in the Christian faith, also healed the sick through prayer and with the restorative power of water.

In the 10th century, the spring came into the possession of the archbishops of Salzburg.

In 1875, the Adelholzener spring water was first sold and by 1895, the mineral water was being shipped nationwide. At the beginning of the 20th century, the spa and bathing business in Bad Adelholzen went bankrupt and in 1907, the Congregation of the Sisters of Mercy of St. Vinzenz von Pau, based in Munich, acquired the spa and bottling plants. In the following years, the production and administration business was modernized and expanded. In 1919, the first electric bottling plant was completed.

After the Second World War in 1946 the place was awarded the official recognition as a spa by the Bavarian State Ministry of the Interior.

In 1994, the business was renamed Adelholzener Alpen and two years later, built a new warehouse and administrative building. In 1998, the company began using its first returnable polyethylene terephthalate (PET) bottling plant and in 2001 was the company launched their oxygenated water range, Active O2, in Germany which was accompanied by the brand's first television commercial.

In 2013, a new glass bottling plant was built, with a capacity of up to 28,000 bottles per hour and four years later, Adelholzener's seventh bottling line was opened with a capacity of 35,000 reusable PET bottles per hour. The company has a market presence in more than 20 countries, the largest market being in Germany and Japan. The profit made from the mineral water is used to support charities and social institutions around Bavaria through the work of the Covenant.

== Sponsorship ==
Adelholzener had sponsored Sauber Formula 1 cars from 2003 to 2005, including on the cars of Felipe Massa, Nick Heidfeld and Jacques Villeneuve.

Adelholzener is also an official sponsor of FC Bayern Munich and is a partner of the BR-Radltour, a German cycling event, providing water for the participants.
