= Faszination Wissen =

- Genre: Science
- Presented by: Gunnar Mergner
- Country of origin: Germany
- Original language: German

Original release
- Network: Bayerischer Rundfunk
- Release: January 9, 2003

Faszination Wissen (Fascination Knowledge) is a television program of the Bayerischer Rundfunk. The weekly knowledge magazine is broadcast every Monday at 22:00 hours on Bayerisches Fernsehen (a television station) and repeated on Tuesday mornings at 10:50. The program is produced in 16:9 format.

== Hosts ==
Faszination Wissen is hosted by Gunnar Mergner since January 2013. Until the end of 2012, the show was hosted by the scientific journalist Iska Schreglmann. The physicist and magician Thomas Fraps (until 2007) and BR host Stefan Scheider (until 2005) were hosts before.
