= WDR VERA =

- Germany
- Broadcast area: North Rhine-Westphalia

Programming
- Language: German
- Format: Traffic reporting

Ownership
- Operator: Westdeutscher Rundfunk (WDR)

History
- First air date: 30 January 1997
- Last air date: 12 May 2023

WDR VERA was a German, public radio station owned and operated by Westdeutscher Rundfunk (WDR). To increase broadcasting capacity and enable more regional stations, Vera was removed from DAB + on July 6, 2020 and could only be heard via WDR apps and websites. On May 12, 2023, the station was closed.

WDR VERA was WDR's traffic channel, started on 30 January 1997 as part of the North Rhine-Westphalian DAB pilot project, it was broadcast via DAB+ and as a telephone announcement service (+49/221/1680 3050).

VERA was a backronym for VErkehr (traffic) in Real Audio or Verkehrsradio.

The 24-hour schedule consisted entirely of traffic information updated and compiled by WDR's Traffic Department. All traffic information and messages were provided through a speech synthesis system, which was then read by a male, computer-generated voice. There was no live on-air announcer.

== See also ==
- BR Verkehr, a similar radio station in Bavaria
