= Thomas Gaitanides =

- Born: 1948 (age 77–78)
- Occupation: Radio journalist

Thomas Gaitanides (born 1948) is a German radio journalist.

Gaitanides started his career in the 1970s at the Bavarian Broadcasting Corporation (Bayerischer Rundfunk) in the newly established service channel Bayern 3. At the beginning he moderated the programme for drivers, Gute Fahrt. Later he worked for other programmes like B3-Kurier, Radio-Report or Samstagsclub.

In 2008 Gaitanides became chief editor of the new digital channel Bayern plus. Here he was responsible for the daily programme Das Magazin.

Moreover, Gaitanides was responsible for the BR-Radltour from its beginning in 1990 to 2012. Here he earned his nickname "Mr Radltour".

Gaitanides retired in 2013.

Gaitanides published several books about Greece, where his family originally came from.

In July 2024 Gaitanides was awarded the Bavarian Order of Merit (Bayerischer Verdienstorden).
