= Mainstreaming =

Mainstreaming may refer to:

- Gender mainstreaming, the practice of considering impacts on men and women of proposed public policy

- Youth mainstreaming, a derivative concept focusing on the needs of young people

- Mainstreaming (education), the practice of educating students with special needs in regular classes

== See also ==
- Mainstream (disambiguation)
