= Transmission Tower Wendelstein =

The transmission tower Wendelstein is a 55-metre-high transmission tower for FM and TV on the 1838-metre-high Wendelstein Mountain in Southern Bavaria. It was built in 1954 and has no facilities for visitors. Despite its small height, the Transmission Tower Wendelstein is an important FM and TV facility because it can supply its location on the Wendelstein Mountain, large parts of Southern Bavaria, with FM- and TV programmes.

== See also ==
- List of towers
