= Gelbelsee =

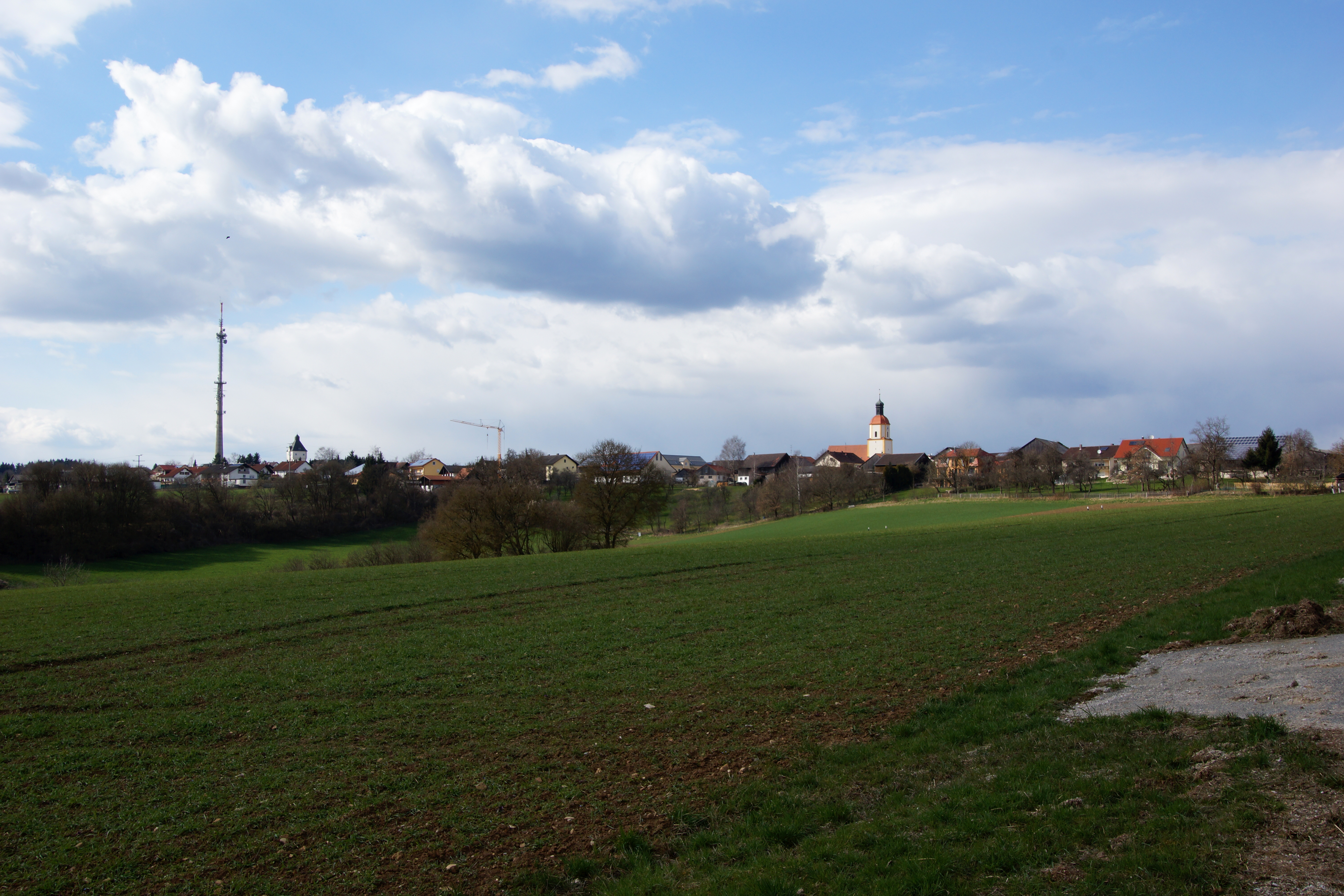
Gelbelsee

Gelbelsee is a north Bavarian village described in historical texts dating from the 13th century.

== History ==
Gelbelsee lies in a forested, age-old settlement area, like the hill graves from the Hallstatt time (1200 to 500 CE). The Hallstein people belonged historically to the Illyrischen people. Germanic people followed them during the migration in the 5th century the Bajuwaren.

Coming from the east, a pre-Roman road continues by Gelbelsee and Kristal and Kipfenberg to the west. One road ran past the Roman lines. Two observation towers, a barracks and well survive. In the oldest documents, the village is known as Gouliubese, "lake of the Gouliub". In 1301 the name Gelbelsee was written.

== Gelbelsee transmitter ==
Gelbelsee transmitter, which belongs to the Bavarian Broadcasting Company, is used for transmitting FM in north Upper Bavaria, Ingolstadt and Eichstätt. It went into service in 1952 as a relay transmitter for Altmühl valley. The concrete tower is 112 metres (367 ft) tall and was built in 1979.

== Climate ==
Climate data for Gelbelsee (1991–2020 normals)
Month	Jan	Feb	Mar	Apr	May	Jun	Jul	Aug	Sep	Oct	Nov	Dec	Year
Mean daily maximum °C (°F)	1.8 (35.2)	3.6 (38.5)	8.4 (47.1)	14.6 (58.3)	18.2 (64.8)	21.9 (71.4)	24.5 (76.1)	23.4 (74.1)	18.8 (65.8)	12.8 (55.0)	6.6 (43.9)	2.8 (37.0)	13.3 (55.9)
Daily mean °C (°F)	−0.7 (30.7)	0.2 (32.4)	4.3 (39.7)	9.3 (48.7)	13.1 (55.6)	16.6 (61.9)	18.7 (65.7)	18.0 (64.4)	13.7 (56.7)	8.9 (48.0)	4.0 (39.2)	0.6 (33.1)	9.2 (48.6)
Mean daily minimum °C (°F)	−3.0 (26.6)	−2.3 (27.9)	0.5 (32.9)	4.6 (40.3)	8.2 (46.8)	11.7 (53.1)	13.6 (56.5)	13.2 (55.8)	9.7 (49.5)	5.6 (42.1)	1.6 (34.9)	−1.5 (29.3)	5.3 (41.5)
Average precipitation mm (inches)	51.8 (2.04)	37.5 (1.48)	38.6 (1.52)	37.9 (1.49)	76.7 (3.02)	71.5 (2.81)	87.0 (3.43)	84.9 (3.34)	49.3 (1.94)	42.4 (1.67)	45.3 (1.78)	54.4 (2.14)	674.7 (26.56)
Average precipitation days (≥ 1.0 mm)	16.5	13.4	12.6	11.4	14.6	14.8	14.5	14.6	11.5	13.4	14.4	17.6	170.9
Average relative humidity (%)	89.8	84.1	75.7	68.2	72.2	71.9	69.0	71.7	78.0	86.3	91.5	91.9	79.2
Mean monthly sunshine hours	51.5	83.6	138.8	209.1	215.8	225.9	243.6	224.0	172.2	117.5	58.5	43.2	1,796.8
Source: World Meteorological Organization
