= Nuremberg-Kleinreuth radio transmitter =

Former broadcasting facility

Coordinates: 49°26′38″N 11°00′31″E

The Transmitter Nuremberg-Kleinreuth was a broadcasting facility for medium wave at Nuremberg, Bavaria, Germany. It was founded in 1927 in Nuremberg-Kleinreuth at the former Broadcast Street 24, now Sigmund Street 181, in order to supply the northern areas of Bavaria with broadcast programs in the medium-wave band.

== Antenna ==
Between 1927 and 1935 this plant's transmission antenna was a T-antenna, which was spun between two 75-metre-high (246 ft) freestanding steel framework towers.

In 1935 this antenna was replaced by a 124-metre-tall (407 ft) tower built of wood, which became available at the change of the antenna system at transmitter Ismaning in 1934 and which was rebuilt in Nuremberg-Kleinreuth after its disassembly.

On 6 April 1950 a 100-metre-high (330 ft) guyed mast radiator went into service at Nuremberg-Kleinreuth. The now dispensable wood tower was demolished on 12 July 1961 because of decay.

== Closure ==
On 15 September 1969 the Nuremberg-Kleinreuth broadcasting station was shut down, after the radio mast at Dillberg had been equipped with a cage aerial for medium wave transmission and thus could overtake the function of the transmitter Nuremberg-Kleinreuth. In 1973 the area of the transmitting plant was sold to the company Theisen KG, which allowed the remaining installations of the abandoned transmitter be demolished in order to build a factory hall there.

== See also ==
- List of towers
