= Stadelheim Transmitter =

Stadelheim Transmitter was a medium wave broadcast transmitter in Munich-Stadelheim, built in 1926 in the neighbourhood of the famous Stadelheim Prison. It took up experimental operation on March 1, 1926, and full operation on April 1, 1926. As antenna, this transmitter used a t-antenna hung up on two 100-metre-high (330 ft) freestanding steel framework towers. The transmitter used a tube transmitter and a machine transmitter from the company C Lorenz AG, the company which made the Lorenz cipher machine. However, the machine transmitter had numerous technical problems.

== Antenna problems ==
In addition, the transmitting antenna did not work well and was replaced in the autumn of 1926 by a T-antenna hung on two 75-metre-high (246 ft) wood framework towers, which were built by the company Kuebler, located in Stuttgart. In the night of 22–23 November 1930 a storm bent both towers at a height of 25 metres; some buildings were also damaged. Transmitting was restarted later that day with an emergency antenna, which was stretched between the tower stumps. The destroyed towers were replaced with two new wood towers with T-antennas, placed farther from the buildings. These were built at the turn of the year 1930/31. After the inauguration of the transmitter Ismaning on December 3, 1932 the transmitter Stadelheim was used as a spare transmitter for the Ismaning facility. It might have been used for the last time in November and December 1933, when the transmitter Ismaning was shut down because of maintenance work.

== See also ==
- List of towers
