= Ismaning radio transmitter =

Architectural structure

Coordinates: 48°15′03″N 11°45′10″E

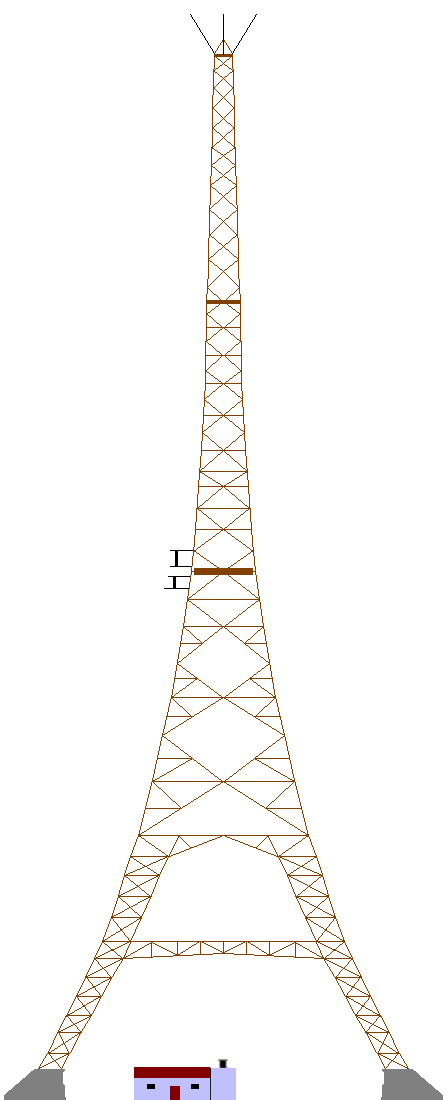
Drawing of the former wooden radio tower at Ismaning, which looked like the Eiffel Tower

The Transmitter Ismaning was a large radio transmitting station near Ismaning, Bavaria, Germany. It was inaugurated in 1932. From 1932 to 1934 this transmitter (which replaced the Stadelheim Transmitter at Munich-Stadelheim) used a T-antenna as transmitting antenna, which was spun between two 115-metre-high (377 ft) free-standing wooden lattice towers, which were 240 metres apart. As this antenna had an unfavourable vertical radiation pattern, which produced much skywave resulting in a too small fading-free reception area at night, in 1934 a new antenna was installed. Therefore, one of the towers was dismantled and rebuilt on a 39-metre-high (128 ft) wooden lattice base. While this work took place, an L-Antenna was used, which was spun between the other tower and a small auxiliary wooden tower. It became defunct in 1977 and was destroyed in 1983.

== Wooden broadcasting tower ==
After completion of the new wood tower, which was 156 metres high without the arms carrying the antenna (with these arms its height amounted to 163 metres), the second wood tower was dismantled and rebuilt in 1935 at Nuremberg-Kleinreuth, where it served until 1961 as a transmission tower for medium wave. The wood tower at Ismaning carried a dipole antenna, whose point of feeding was at 120 metres height. From this point of feeding, several wires ran to the arms on the tower top and to fastening spots at a height of 80 metres. At this height a differential transformer was installed in a small housing inside the tower; its task was to prevent the drain of the radiated high frequency over the feeder. This antenna, developed by the company Lorenz, was called "Höhendipol". It was one for the transmitter frequency of 740 kHz, which was used from 1934 to 1950, optimized fading-reducing transmitting antenna. However, according to the wave plan of Copenhagen, which required directional radiation at night times, it could only be used during daylight hours after 1950. In 1969 this antenna was dismantled after a new medium wave transmitting mast was built. Between 1969 and 1977 the wood tower was used for carrying transmitting antennas for FM broadcasting. In 1977 a 100-metre-high (330 ft) guyed steel framework mast took over this function, so the wood tower became defunct in 1977. The state of the tower worsened more and more after 1977, and it seemed to be impossible to repair this tower, which was nicknamed "Bavarian Eiffel Tower," and which was already under protection as a monument. On March 16, 1983 it was blown up. Its concrete foundations and the tuning house, which once stood under the tower, can still be seen today.

== Services transmitted ==
=== Bavarian Broadcasting Company ===
The transmission facility Ismaning is used for transmitting the first program of the Bavarian Broadcasting Company on the medium wave frequency 801 kHz (transmission power 600 kilowatts until 1994, now 100 kilowatts) and for all programmes of the Bavarian Broadcasting company in the FM range. Until 1994 there was also a transmitter of the American Forces Network (AFN), with its AFN Munich station, at Ismaning.

For the AM transmissions a 171.5-metre-high (563 ft) guyed steel tube mast is used. This mast is insulated from the ground and is designed as a fading reducing transmission aerial with multiple feeding. Therefore, it is separated at 56-metre and 117-metre heights by insulators.

Restrictions of the waveplan of Geneva required a minimum of radiation in direction Northeast, in order to reduce interferences of the transmitter Saint Petersburg, Russia, on the same frequency, if transmission power is 600 kilowatts at night. Therefore, in 1978 a 71-metre-high (233 ft) guyed steel-framework mast, which is insulated against ground, was built near the mast upper mentioned. Because a power reduction toward northeast is not necessary with a transmission power of 100 kilowatts, this mast is now obsolete, but it is still there.

As back-up aerial a 105-metre-high (344 ft), guyed steel framework mast was built in 1947 close to the transmitter building. This mast, which was originally used for transmitting the program of AFN was until 1969 126 metres high and carried from 1958 to 1969 aerials for FM transmissions.

Restriction by the waveplan of Copenhagen had the result, that the mediumwave transmitter of the Bavarian Broadcasting Company had to work with directional radiation with minimum toward Northeast after 1951 at nighttime. This type of radiation was not possible with the aerial on the wood framework tower and a directional aerial consisting of two insulated guyed radio masts with a height of 94 metres had to be built.

This aerial was until 1969 for transmitting the program of the Bavarian broadcasting company during nighttime in service. After 1969 it was used until its shutdown in 1994 for transmitting the program of AFN on 1107 kHz. In difference to the time before 1969 omnidirectional radiation was used. One mast was used and the other one was a spare unit.

As aerials for shortwave transmissions of the Bavarian broadcasting company there are a dipole aerial, built in 1976, which hangs on two guyed steelframework masts with a height of 35 metres and a winkle dipole which hangs on three guyed steel framework masts with a height of 55 metres. The winkle dipole aerial went in service in 1980.

For FM broadcasting transmission, there is a silvery grey guyed steel framework mast with dipol arrays on its top near the station building. This mast, which was built in 1977, has a height of 100 metres and is the only mast at the transmitter Ismaning, which is grounded.

=== Voice of America ===
The Voice of America ran until 1994 near the station of the Bavarian Broadcasting company a large shortwave transmission facility, which has nowadays has been scrapped The medium wave transmission facility of the Voice of America and Radio Free Europe/Radio Liberty operated by the International Broadcasting Bureau was shut down in March 2005. It consists of four guyed steel framework masts, which are insulated against ground. These masts were built in 1949 and renovated in the 1990s and allow the powered aerial to transmit in various directions.

In 2010, a 210-metre-tall (690 ft) new guyed mast for FM broadcasting was built.

== See also ==
- List of towers
- List of masts
- List of famous transmission sites
