= Greding =

- Town
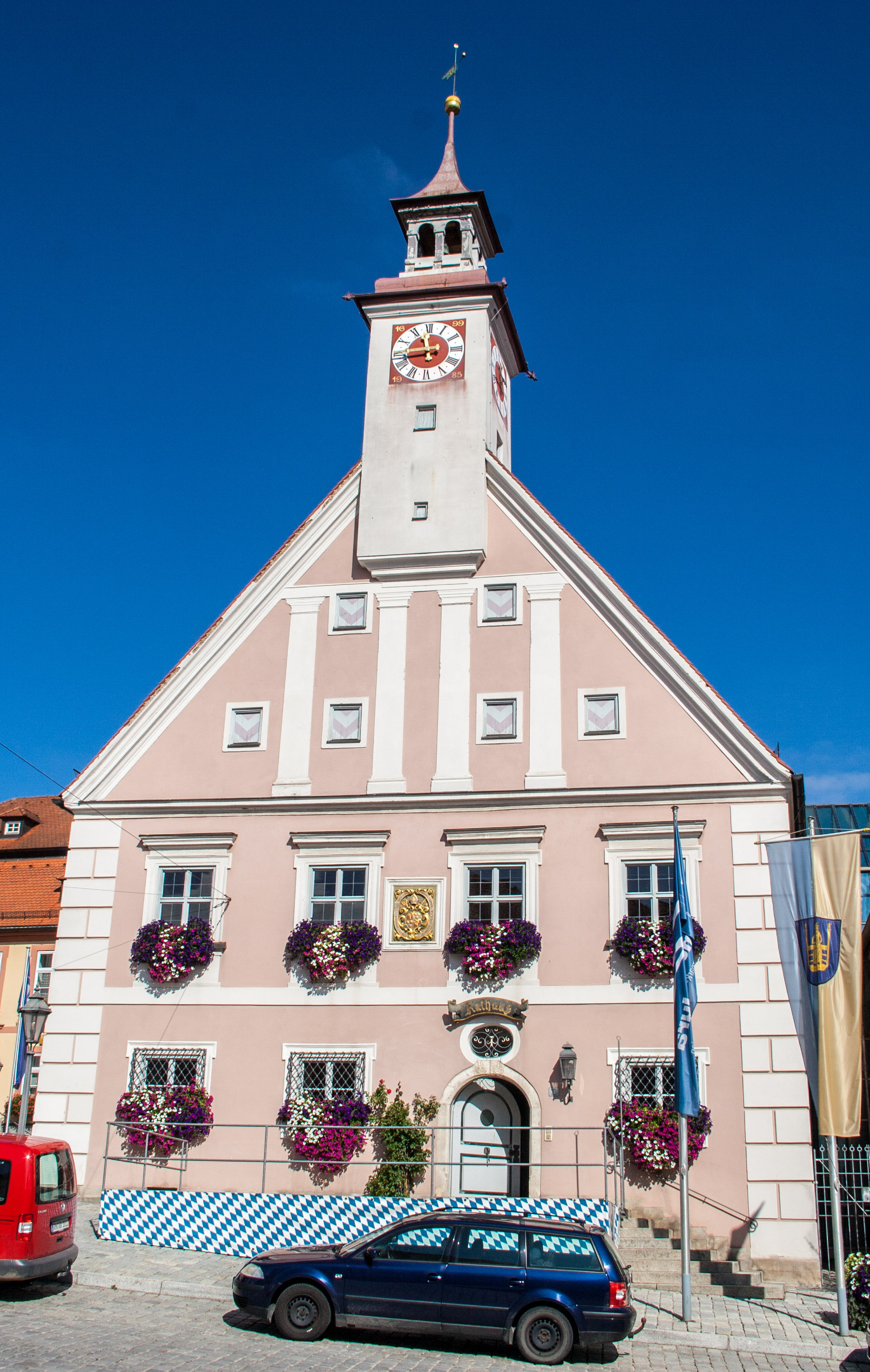
- City Hall of Greding

- Coat of arms

- Location of Greding within Roth district
- Interactive map of Greding
- Location within Germany Location within Bavaria
- Coordinates: 49°03′07″N 11°21′38″E
- Country: Germany
- State: Bavaria
- Admin. region: Mittelfranken
- District: Roth

Area
  - Total: 103.73 km^{2} (40.05 sq mi)
- Elevation: 397 m (1,302 ft)

Population (2025-12-31)
  - Total: 7,070
  - Density: 68.2/km^{2} (177/sq mi)
- Time zone: UTC+01:00 (CET)
  - Summer (DST): UTC+02:00 (CEST)
- Postal codes: 91171
- Dialling codes: 08463
- Vehicle registration: RH
- Website: www.greding.de

Greding (German pronunciation: [ˈɡʁeːdɪŋ]) is a town in the district of Roth, in Bavaria, Germany. It is situated 28 km southeast of Roth bei Nürnberg and 32 km north of Ingolstadt.

== Geography ==
Greding is located in the south-eastern corner of Middle Franconia. The municipal area borders on two neighbouring Bavarian districts, Eichstätt and Neumarkt, and also on the two regions of Upper Bavaria and Upper Palatinate. Greding is situated about 32 km north of the city of Ingolstadt on the A9 Autobahn (junction 57).

Greding stands on the river Schwarzach in the Altmühl Valley Nature Park. Two hills around the town are the Kalvarienberg and the Galgenberg.

The township of Greding includes the villages of Attenhofen, Birkhof, Esselberg, Euerwang, Grafenberg, Großhöbing, Günzenhofen, Hausen, Heimbach, Herrnsberg, Hofberg, Kaising, Kleinnottersdorf, Kraftsbuch, Landerzhofen, Linden, Mettendorf, Obermässing, Österberg, Röckenhofen, Schutzendorf, Untermässing and Viehhausen.

Neighbouring townships are Beilngries, Berching, Dietfurt an der Altmühl, Freystadt, Hilpoltstein, Kinding and Thalmässing.

== History ==
There are remains of animal jawbones and charcoal fires from early settlements dating from between 10000 BC and 6000 BC. Traces of a Celtic settlement have been found dating from 450-350 BC.

The first known documentary record of a township is from 1091. In the 11th century the Greding estate came under the ownership of the Bishops of Eichstätt and remained under their jurisdiction until 1803.

== Religion ==
Like most of Bavaria, Greding is predominantly Roman Catholic.

== Culture and places of interest ==
=== Architecture ===
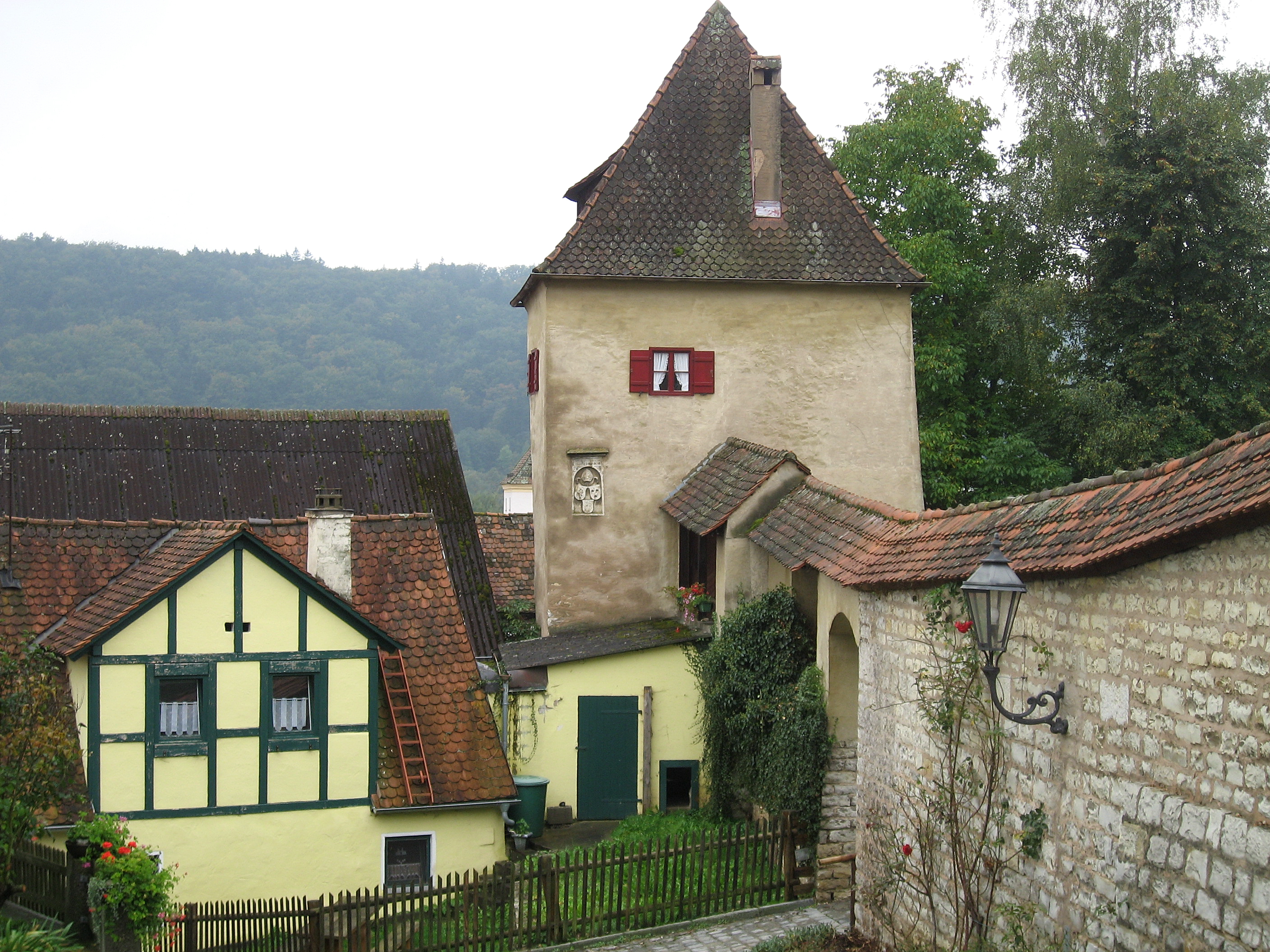
The town wall

Greding is surrounded by a 1.25 km town wall with fortified gate houses and towers. The wall was erected during the rule of the Prince Bishop Friedrich IV, Count of Öttingen (1383–1415). A great fire in 1503 destroyed two gate houses, a tower and part of the town hall. Today, 20 towers can be seen around the town, almost all used as private houses. The large fortified gate houses to be seen are the Fürstentor, the Eichstätter Tor and the Nürnberger Tor .

The numerous historic towers throughout the town have earned it the nickname, "The City of 21 Towers" (Die Stadt der 21 Türme).

=== Rathaus ===
The old town hall stood in the Market Square until the Thirty Years War. In 1633 the building was burned down in an attempt to extort 1000 Reichsthaler ransom money from the citizens. The site is now occupied by a fountain. The current town hall building was erected in 1699 and is thought to be the work of the Eichstätt architect Jakob Engel. The façade is decorated with the arms of the lord of the estate, Prince Bishop Johann Martin von Eyb (1697–1704).

=== The Basilica of St. Martin ===
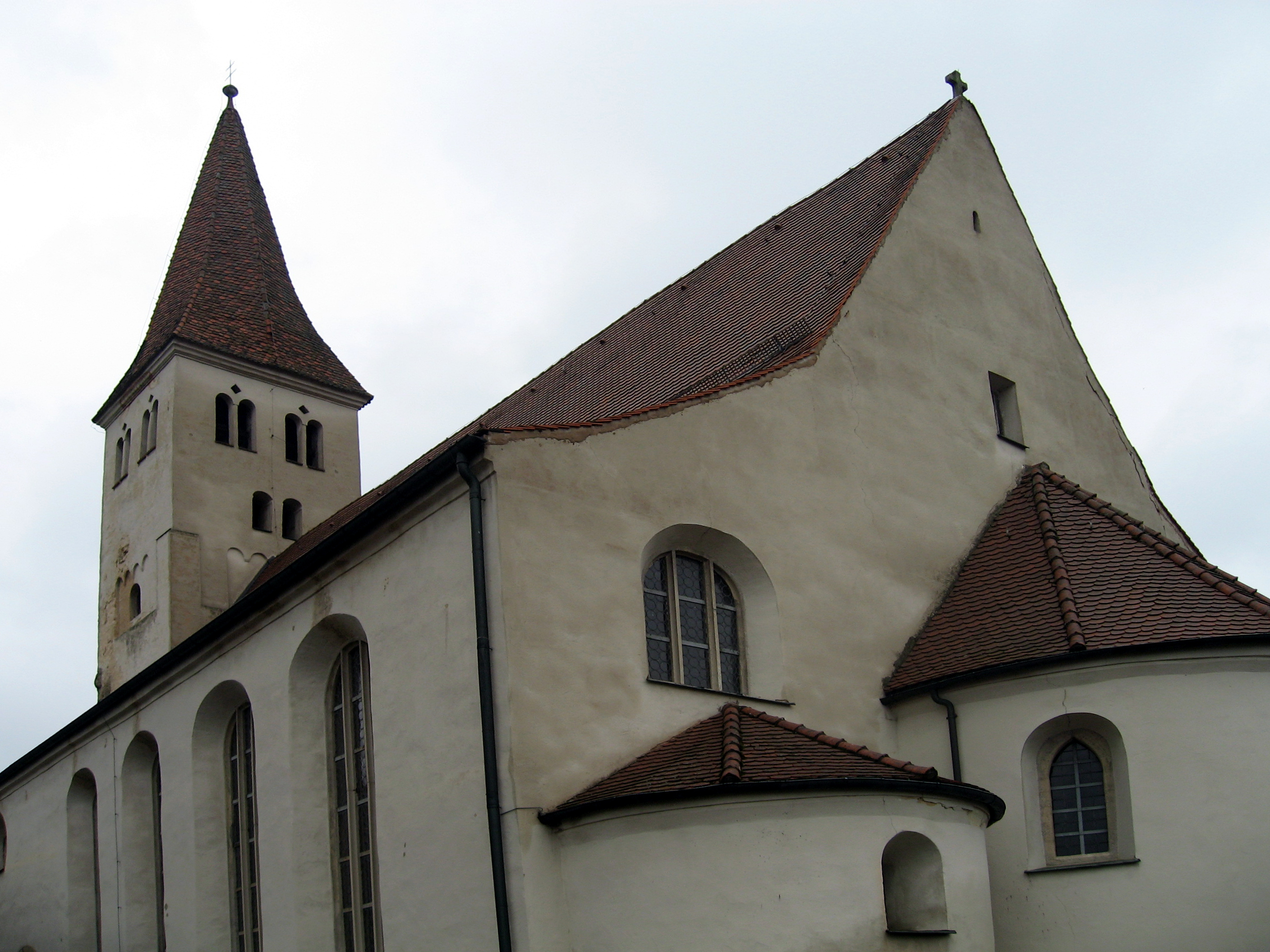
St Martin's Church

This predominantly 12th-century church stands on a hill overlooking the town and is a conspicuous local landmark. St Martins is the largest Romanesque basilica in the former diocese of Eichstätt. It was consecrated by Bishop Otto (1182–1196). The late gothic altar dates from 1480 and is flanked by rococo figures of the Virgin Mary and St John from around 1780. The apse ceiling is painted with images of Christ enthroned and symbols of the Evangelists, and the 15th-century nave frescoes depict St Martin astride a horse, dividing his cloak with a sword for a beggar. The church also contains a number of early renaissance paintings and sculptures.

To the left of St Martin's Church in the cellar of the former Michael's Chapel, dating from the early 12th century, is a so-called Charnel House. This was first used in the 14th century to store the bones of the dead as the graveyard itself became too full. The bones of about 2500 corpses can be seen behind an iron grille.

Other buildings of note include the Catholic Church of St. Jakob; the former Episcopal palace (1696) on the market square; and the episcopal hunting lodge (1741), now occupied by the Raiffeisenbank.

=== Museums ===
Greding has two museums, the Museum Natur und Mensch (natural history) and the Sparkassenmuseum (a banking museum).

== Economy and infrastructure ==
=== Transport ===
Greding is located near junction 57 on the A9 autobahn.

The town is served by several local and regional buses, and has direct bus connections to Nuremberg, Munich and Berlin.

A bus service links the town with Kinding (Altmühltal) railway station, which is on the Nuremberg–Ingolstadt high-speed railway which runs through the 7.7 km Euerwangtunnel. The Greding railway station on the Roth-Greding rail line closed in 1972.

=== Media ===
The local paper is the Hilpoltsteiner Kurier.
