= Mainstream =

Mainstream may refer to:

== Literature ==
- Mainstream (fanzine), a science fiction fanzine
- Mainstream Publishing, a Scottish publisher
- Mainstream, a 1943 book by Hamilton Basso
- Mainstream: On the Global Culture War, a 2013 book by Frédéric Martel
- Mainstream fiction, literary concept

== Music ==
- Mainstream jazz, a term coined in the 1950s to describe the form of jazz which was a continuation of the Swing era
- Mainstream (band), a late-1990s British shoegazer band, or their first album
- Mainstream (Fullerton College Jazz Band album), 1994
- Mainstream (Lloyd Cole and the Commotions album), 1987
- Mainstream (Quiet Sun album), 1975
- Mainstream EP, by Metric, 1998
- Mainstream Records, an American record label
- "Mainstream", a song by Thea Gilmore from the 2003 album Avalanche

== Other ==
- Mainstream media
- Mainstream (film), a 2020 American film
- Mainstream (political organisation), a British centre-left pressure group

== See also ==
- Mainstreaming (disambiguation)
