= ARD-alpha =

German television channel

ARD alpha
- Country: Bavaria, Germany
- Broadcast area: Germany
- Network: ARD

Programming
- Picture format: 720p HDTV

Ownership
- Owner: Bayerischer Rundfunk
- Sister channels: Das Erste; BR Fernsehen; One; Tagesschau24

History
- Launched: 7 January 1998; 28 years ago
- Closed: January 1, 2027; 49 days' time
- Former names: BR-alpha (1998–2014)

Links
- Website: ard-alpha.de

Availability

Terrestrial
- Digital terrestrial television: Varies depending on the region

Streaming media
- ARD-Alpha Livestream: Watch Live

Logo of BR-alpha from October 2007 to 29 June 2014

ARD alpha is a German free-to-air television channel run by regional public-service broadcaster Bayerischer Rundfunk. Its programming consists of shows made by Bayerischer Rundfunk, as well as from ARD and Austrian broadcaster ORF. The channel was originally called BR-alpha, but was rebranded as ARD-alpha on 29 June 2014.

== Programmes ==
ARD-alpha broadcasts educational programmes including; science, religion, music, philosophy, literature, language learning, art and culture.

== History ==
=== BR-alpha (1998-2014) ===
BR-alpha, as the station was originally called, started broadcasting on January 7, 1998. The station's programmes were originally broadcast in analog using the Astra satellite and were also distributed by cable networks. The schedule focused mainly on education and information. The channel began digital broadcasts via Astra in the summer of 1998. On 28 November 2000, the heads of the regional public broadcasters agreed to start cooperating with BR-alpha.

On 30 September 2002, the channel started broadcasting Planet Wissen ("Planet Knowledge" in English), a general knowledge programme and a co-production of BR-alpha, Westdeutscher Rundfunk and Südwestrundfunk. The programme also has an extensive internet presence. Bavaria started digital terrestrial television broadcasts on 30 May 2005, as did BR-alpha.

The channel's scheduled were revamped on 16 February 2008. Career guidance programmes, a magazine aimed at young people called freiraum were started, and programs W wie Wissen and Faszination Wissen were also added.

On 9 August 2009, the youth program on3-südwild switched from Bavarian Television to BR-alpha. On 27 June 2010, Andreas Höfer won the Deutschen Kamerapreis (German Camera Award) in the category TV movie /docudrama for the BR-alpha film Empathie – Stumme Schreie (Empathy - Silent screams).

=== ARD alpha (2014-2026) ===
The channel changed its name to ARD alpha on 29 June 2014. The schedule was reorganised the previous day. BR is still responsible for financing and broadcasting the channel, but some programmes originally broadcast by other ARD member stations were added to ARD alpha's schedule. Cooperation with ORF (the Austrian public broadcaster) in the form of alpha-Österreich continued, and its television programs are now aired after 10 pm instead of in the early evening. Werner Reuss is head of ARD alpha.

In March 2026, it was announced that ARD-alpha will be closed in January 2027 as part of a larger-scale consolidation of ARD and ZDF's channel portfolio. Its remit will be taken over by ZDFinfo.

== Broadcast ==
SD broadcasting via satellite (Astra 19.2) stopped on 12 January 2021.

== Audience share ==
=== Germany ===
	January	February	March	April	May	June	July	August	September	October	November	December	Annual average
2017	0.1%	0.1%	0.1%	0.1%	0.1%	0.1%	0.1%	0.1%	0.1%	0.1%			
