= Dillberg =

Hill in Bavaria, Germany

- Location within Bavaria

Highest point
- Elevation: 595 m (1,952 ft)
- Coordinates: 49°20′N 11°23′E

Geography
- Location: Bavaria, Germany

The Dillberg is a hill in Bavaria, Germany.
