= BR24live =

- Germany
- Broadcast area: Bavaria
- Frequency: DAB: 11D

Programming
- Language: German
- Format: All-news radio

Ownership
- Operator: Bayerischer Rundfunk (BR)
- Sister stations: BR24; Bayern 1 Bayern 2 Bayern 3 BR-Klassik; BR Heimat; BR Schlager

History
- First air date: 8 October 2007
- Former names: B5 plus (2007–2021)

Links
- Webcast: Listen live
- Website: BR24live

BR24live (known as B5 plus until 30 June 2021) is a German public news radio station owned and operated by Bayerischer Rundfunk (BR). It is a sister station of BR24 and adds to its content with broadcasting from parliaments and sports. Unlike BR24, it is not available on FM.

The channel is scheduled to close by December 31, 2026.

== Logos ==
former Logo of B5 plus

former First Logo of BR24live
