= BR24 (TV program) =

Television program

- Also known as: BR24 Rundschau Magazin (21:45); BR24 Rundschau Nacht (late-night); BR24 Rundschau in 100 Sekunden (short bulletins)
- Presented by: Various
- Country of origin: Germany
- Original language: German

Production
- Producer: Bayerischer Rundfunk
- Running time: Main edition: 30 minutes Afternoon edition: 15 minutes BR24 Rundschau Magazin: 15 minutes BR24 Rundschau Nacht: 10 minutes

Original release
- Network: BR Fernsehen
- Release: 1 October 1979 – present

BR24 (previously BR24 Rundschau; until June 30, 2021: Rundschau) is a television news program produced and airing on BR Fernsehen. It started airing on October 1, 1979. Originally intended as a regional-oriented program, BR24 Rundschau later include reports from around Germany which also appeal to viewers in other states. BR24 reports updates from Bavaria, Germany and the world.

== History ==
On 25 July 1988, ARD's top rating news program, Tagesschau, produced by Norddeutscher Rundfunk in Hamburg, was to be cancelled due to a warning strike organized by the broadcasting union RFFU. This would have been the first time in the history of the ARD that the Tagesschau was not broadcast. It helped out for Tagesschau as a substitute program and in this way was broadcast nationwide.

For decades, the main edition of the Rundschau was broadcast at 6:45pm on BR Fernsehen; however, as part of a major programming overhaul, from 11 April 2016 it was extended from 15 to 30 minutes and moved to start at 6:30pm. As part of this revamp, Rundschau also received a new format, a new studio and a new on-air design. From 7 August 2017, BR put another new studio in operation, with a green screen and robotic cameras; the design of the Rundschau remained unchanged.
