= Bayern 1 =

- Germany
- Broadcast area: Bavaria; South Tyrol (via DAB+)
- Frequencies: DAB: 11D; 40 FM frequencies

Programming
- Language: German
- Format: AC

Ownership
- Operator: Bayerischer Rundfunk (BR)
- Sister stations: Bayern 2 Bayern 3 BR-Klassik; BR24; BR24live; BR Heimat; BR Schlager

History
- First air date: 31 January 1948

Links
- Webcast: Listen Live
- Website: bayern1.de

Bayern 1 is a German public radio station in Bavaria, owned and operated by the Bayerischer Rundfunk (BR).

== History ==
Bayern 1 historically emerged from the first, until 1950 only, radio programme of the Bayerischer Rundfunk and is a so-called full programme. It owes its official name Bayern 1 to the program reform of January 1, 1974. The station is aimed at a middle-aged audience and, in addition to the music format in the Adult Contemporary category (listenable format radio for adults), also offers more recent pop music as well as information and comprehensive regional reporting.

== Programme ==
Regional programme: During the day, Bayern 1 broadcasts regional news and between 12 and 13 o'clock one hour of regional magazine. Broadcasting is split between the five regional editorial offices in Franconia, Upper Bavaria, Lower Bavaria/Upper Palatinate, Swabia and Main Franconia. Until the end of 2015, there was a separate regional programme for Munich, which was discontinued for cost reasons; the editorial office was dissolved and integrated into the editorial office for Upper Bavaria. At the beginning of October 2015, the changeover first took place in the Mittagsmagazin, and at the turn of the year 2015/2016 also in the Regionalnachrichten.

After midnight, Bayern 1 aired the ARD-Hitnacht (ARD hit night) from SR 3 Saarlandwelle until 7 March 2016, and on Sundays the "Rhythmus der Nacht" (rhythm of the night) from WDR 4. Since 8 March 2016, a separate night programme has been broadcast with Die Nacht auf Bayern 1 or on Sunday Bayern 1 Night Fever - Die lange Disconacht für Bayern. The night programme is unmoderated, but the weather and traffic news from Bayern 3 are taken over in parallel and stored with the Bayern 1 music beds. Likewise, in case of acute danger alarms (e.g. ghost drivers) the running Bayern 1 programme is interrupted by the Bayern 3 moderator. Directly after the midnight news, the Bavarian anthem, the German national anthem and the European anthem are sung.

Before 1996, Bayern 1 broadcast almost exclusively German-language and folk music. After internal surveys regarding the musical tastes of their target group ("In the middle of life"), those responsible decided on an oldie-based music format, which has been presenting hits from the 1970s and 1980s since autumn 2013, mainly from pop music as well as folk rock and soft rock. Since 2016, more recent pop music has also been played occasionally.

In the course of time, musical genres were thus removed from Bayern 1 and redistributed as follows on Bayerischer Rundfunk:

In January 2013 the broadcasts of musical and operetta melodies were discontinued. This music – assigned to classical music – was thus transferred to BR-Klassik.

After the programme had already shifted towards oldies in 2013, the German Schlagerparade and the programme Deutsch nach Acht (German after Eight) remained. These were later also discontinued completely, and all Schlager was thus moved to the digital channel Bayern plus.

The programme hour from 7 pm to 8 pm was for a long time reserved for folk music. On Sunday morning, there was brass music for one hour at 11 o'clock. Since BR Heimat started broadcasting on 2 February 2015, folk and brass band music has also been broadcast 24 hours a day on the new digital channel. As a result of the restructuring, folk and brass music was no longer broadcast on Bayern 1 from 15 May 2016. Since then, folk and brass music can only be heard on BR Heimat. This was opposed by several petitions in Bavaria, which were aimed at preserving the folk music tradition in the programme of Bayern 1.The initiators of the petitions pleaded for the preservation of the Bavarian cultural heritage, which in their opinion was endangered, wished for a renaissance of folk music and criticised what they saw as a lack of orientation of the programme towards the listeners.

The programme Heute im Stadion (Today in the Stadium) reports from 3 to 6 p.m. on Saturdays on the current matchday of the Bundesliga, and takes over the ARD Bundesliga conference, as well as the Sunday celebrity talk show Die Blaue Couch (The Blue Couch) from 12 noon to 2 p.m., which has now been broadcast additionally on weekdays from 7 to 8 p.m. since January 8, 2019.

Since 8 January 2019, the Betthupferl (bedtime story for children), which used to be broadcast daily at 19:55 on Bayern 1, is now broadcast Monday to Saturday at 18:53 on Bayern 2. BR Heimat alone still broadcasts it at 19:55.

== Distribution ==
It is broadcast throughout Bavaria via FM and DAB+ and is fed into all cable networks via DVB-C. In addition, the program is available via Deukom, DVB-S (regional window of Upper Bavaria) and on the Internet. In South Tyrol, Bayern 1 is broadcast in the DAB+ standard by Rundfunk-Anstalt Südtirol.
