= BR Heimat =

- Germany
- Broadcast area: Bavaria, Berlin, South Tyrol
- Frequencies: DAB: 11D (Bavaria); 7D (Berlin)

Programming
- Language: German

Ownership
- Operator: Bayerischer Rundfunk (BR)
- Sister stations: Bayern 1 Bayern 2 Bayern 3 BR-Klassik; BR24; BR24live; BR Schlager

History
- First air date: 2 February 2015

Links
- Webcast: Listen Live
- Website: br-heimat.de

BR Heimat is a German, public radio station owned and operated by the Bayerischer Rundfunk. It broadcasts Bavarian folk music, and documentaries on tradition and culture. It is a digital-only station and is not available via FM broadcasting. The station replaced Bayern 2 plus on 2 February 2015.
