= BR24 =

- Germany
- Broadcast area: Bavaria; South Tyrol (via DAB+)
- Frequencies: DAB: 11D; 33 FM frequencies

Programming
- Language: German
- Format: All-news radio

Ownership
- Operator: Bayerischer Rundfunk (BR)
- Sister stations: BR24live; Bayern 1 Bayern 2 Bayern 3 BR-Klassik; BR Heimat; BR Schlager

History
- First air date: 6 May 1991
- Former names: B5 aktuell (1991–2021)

Links
- Webcast: Listen Live
- Website: www.br.de/radio/live/br24/

BR24 is a cross-platform news brand of German public broadcaster Bayerischer Rundfunk (BR) which is at the same time a news website, a 24/7 news radio station (until 30 June, 2021: B5 aktuell) and a television news programme (until June 30, 2021: Rundschau).

On May 3, 2021, Bayerischer Rundfunk announced that B5 aktuell would be renamed BR24 on July 1, 2021. "BR24" was added to the names of existing TV programmes. BR created a single brand for news. When it began broadcasting on May 6, 1991, B5 aktuell was the first news station in German-language radio.

== Logos ==
Logo of B5 aktuell (2007–2021)

Logo of BR24 until 2024

== Programming ==
Editors and technicians work in three shifts every day, with broadcasting beginning shortly before 6 a.m. From midnight to 6 a.m., BR24 broadcasts ARD Info night produced by NDR Info. In March 2019, the station increased regional reporting from Bavaria, with accompanying programme changes, using the slogan "From Bavaria for Bavaria."
