= BR-Klassik =

- Germany
- Broadcast area: Bavaria; South Tyrol (via DAB+)
- Frequencies: DAB: 11D; 34 FM frequencies

Programming
- Language: German
- Format: Classical music

Ownership
- Operator: Bayerischer Rundfunk (BR)
- Sister stations: Bayern 1 Bayern 2 Bayern 3 BR24; BR24live; BR Heimat; BR Schlager

History
- First air date: 4 October 1980
- Former names: Bayern 4 Klassik

Links
- Webcast: Listen Live
- Website: br-klassik.de

BR-Klassik is the common branding of the classical music offerings of the Bayerischer Rundfunk (BR), the public broadcaster of Bavaria. It is principally associated with the Munich-based radio station, created in 1980 and called Bayern 4 Klassik until 2009, but the name is also used on the television channels and online broadcasts and publications of the BR, as well as by its record label, which publishes recordings made by its musical ensembles.
