= Hühnerberg (Swabia) =

Mountain in Germany

Coordinates: 48°47′12″N 10°40′07″E

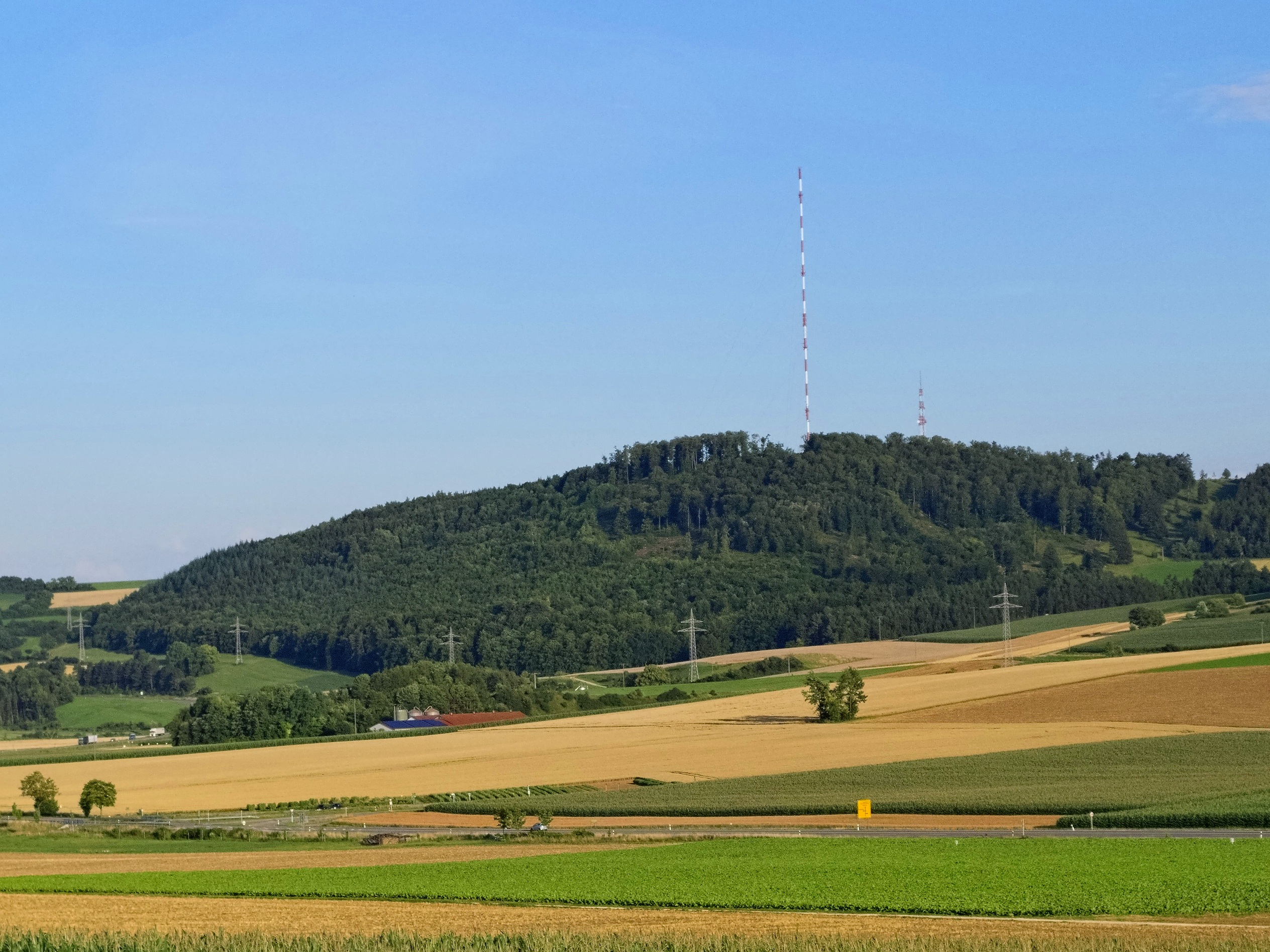

Highest point
- Elevation: 570 m (1,870 ft)

Geography
- Location: Bavaria, Germany

Hühnerberg is a mountain of Bavaria, Germany with an elevation of 571 meters, situated west of Harburg (Swabia), between the towns of Nördlingen and Donauwörth in Bavaria, Germany. The Hühnerberg transmitter, a notable broadcasting facility, is located on its summit.
