= BR Schlager =

- Germany
- Broadcast area: Bavaria, Berlin
- Frequencies: DAB: 11D (Bavaria); 7D (Berlin)

Programming
- Language: German

Ownership
- Operator: Bayerischer Rundfunk (BR)
- Sister stations: Bayern 1 Bayern 2 Bayern 3 BR-Klassik; BR24; BR24live; BR Heimat

History
- First air date: 1 September 2008
- Former names: Bayern plus

Links
- Webcast: Listen Live
- Website: br-schlager.de

BR Schlager (known as Bayern plus until 20 January 2021) is a German, public radio station owned and operated by Bayerischer Rundfunk (BR). It focuses on German Schlager music and international oldies. It is a digital-only station and is not available on FM. The station replaced Bayern mobil on 1 September 2008.

The channel is scheduled to close by December 31, 2026.
