= Bayern 2 =

- Germany
- Broadcast area: Bavaria; South Tyrol (via DAB+)
- Frequencies: DAB: 11D; 41 FM frequencies

Programming
- Language: German

Ownership
- Operator: Bayerischer Rundfunk (BR)
- Sister stations: Bayern 1 Bayern 3 BR-Klassik; BR24; BR24live; BR Heimat; BR Schlager

History
- First air date: 18 August 1950
- Former call signs: Bayern2Radio (2003–2007)

Links
- Webcast: Listen Live
- Website: br.de/radio/bayern2/index.html

Bayern 2 is a German public radio station in Bavaria owned and operated by Bayerischer Rundfunk (BR). It broadcasts culture and general interest programmes as well as a broad selection of music.
