= Bayern 3 =

- Germany
- Broadcast area: Bavaria; South Tyrol (via DAB+)
- Frequencies: DAB: 11D; 42 FM frequencies

Programming
- Language: German
- Format: Hot AC

Ownership
- Operator: Bayerischer Rundfunk (BR)
- Sister stations: Bayern 1 Bayern 2 BR-Klassik; BR24; BR24live; BR Heimat; BR Schlager

History
- First air date: 1 April 1971

Links
- Webcast: Listen Live
- Website: bayern3.de

Bayern 3 is a public radio station owned and operated by Bayerischer Rundfunk (BR), the public broadcaster in the German state of Bavaria.

== History ==
Bayern 3 started operating on 1 April 1971 as BR’s third radio channel. It is focused on pop music. It has more than 2 million daily listeners.

In February 2021, Bayern 3 host Matthias Matuschik faced criticism after an on-air xenophobic tirade against South Korean boyband BTS. Various hashtags began trending on Twitter over the weekend, demanding an apology.

Bayern 3 was again criticized when instead of apologizing, they issued a statement blaming people for being offended and that Matuschik was stating an opinion. Various artists condemned Matuschik’s words, including Halsey, Lauv, Zara Larsson and others. Another apology was issued, but Matuschik’s continued denial of wrongdoing led to more scrutiny.

More posts from Matuschik’s Instagram were revealed to also be racist. The DJ deleted his Instagram on 28 February 2021.
