= Bayerischer Rundfunk =

Public-service radio and television broadcaster based in Munich

Coordinates: 48°08′34″N 11°33′13″E

- Type: Broadcast radio, television and online
- Country: Germany
- Availability: Regional; National (streaming); International (streaming)
- Licence area: Free State of Bavaria
- Headquarters: Munich, Bavaria, Germany
- Key people: Katja Wildermuth, managing director
- Launch date: 30 March 1924 (Deutsche Stunde in Bayern); 25 January 1949 (Bayerischer Rundfunk)
- Former names: Deutsche Stunde in Bayern (1922–1930); Bayerischer Rundfunk GmbH (1931–1933); Reichssender München (1933–1945); Radio München (1945–1949)
- Affiliation: ARD
- Webcast: Watch Nord; Watch Süd; Watch Panorama
- Official website: br.de
- Language: German, Bavarian

Bayerischer Rundfunk (pronounced [ˈbaɪʁɪʃɐ ˈʁʊntfʊŋk]; "Bavarian Broadcasting"), shortened to BR (pronounced [beːˈʔɛʁ]), is a public-service radio and television broadcaster, based in Munich, capital city of the Free State of Bavaria in Germany. BR is a member organization of the ARD consortium of public broadcasters in Germany.

== History ==
Bayerischer Rundfunk was founded in Munich in 1922 as Deutsche Stunde in Bayern. It aired its first program on 30 March 1924. The first broadcasts consisted mainly of time announcements, news, weather and stock market reports, and music. Programming expanded to include radio plays, concerts, programs for women, language courses, chess, opera, radio, news, and Catholic and Protestant morning services. Its new 1929 studio was designed by Richard Riemerschmid.

"Reichssender München" logo from 1934 to 1945

Deutsche Stunde in Bayern became Bayerischer Rundfunk in 1931. In 1933, shortly after the Nazi seizure of power, the station was put under the control of the Reich Ministry of Public Enlightenment and Propaganda. After the Allied victory over Nazi Germany, the American military occupation government's Information Control Division (ICD) took control of the station. Operating as Radio Munich, it, Radio Stuttgart, and Radio Frankfurt began broadcasting in June 1945, using programs from Radio 1212 until November. Radio Munich broadcast, among other programming, live coverage of the Nuremberg trials and programs such as "War Never Again" ("Nie wieder Krieg"). 1945-1946 ICD surveys found that while listeners preferred Radio Munich's news (other than the war crimes trials) to that of Berliner Rundfunk, they preferred the Soviet broadcaster for music because they much preferred German music to American.

In 1949, Radio Munich became Bayerischer Rundfunk, and in that year it established Europe's first VHF station. A station was added in Nuremberg in the early 1950s. Television broadcasts began in 1954.

== Legal foundation ==
BR is a statutory corporation established under the Bavarian Broadcasting Law (Bayerisches Rundfunkgesetz), originally passed in 1948, and updated in 1993 to take account of the demands of a changed media and political environment. Its functions are determined by a legal foundation which lays down the principles under which the broadcaster operates and the structure of its internal organization.

The broadcast law is supplemented by the so-called Broadcast State Contract (Rundfunkstaatsvertrag), a multilateral agreement between all 16 German Länder which regulates the relationship of public and private broadcast in the dual broadcast system and which contains fundamental regulations particularly for financing. Just as important for the work of Bavarian Broadcasting is the cooperation of the ARD consortium, consisting of nine other regional broadcasting corporates as well as Deutsche Welle. The broadcasting service is further backed by the relevant European legal bases as well as the media service convention, which contain regulations for the on-line offerings of Bavarian Broadcasting.

== Funding ==
BR is in part funded by commercial activity, including the limited sale of on-air commercial advertising time; however, its principal source of income is the revenue derived from viewer and listener licence fees. Every household in Germany is required by law to pay a Rundfunkbeitrag (broadcast contribution) of €18.36 per month as of August 2021 to finance the public broadcast system. The fee is collected by ARD ZDF Deutschlandradio Beitragsservice.

In 2012, BR derived 85.3% of its income from viewer and listener licence fees, 12.6% from other sources such as product licensing and investments, and 2.1% from the sale of advertising time. 48.5% of this income was spent on programme production costs, 25.1% on staffing, and 26.4% on other operating expenses and fixed charges.

== Television series produced by BR ==
BR produces several series that are well known throughout Bavaria, and some of these are re-broadcast throughout other parts of Germany. These include:

- BR24
- quer
- Münchner Runde (political talkshow)
- alpha-Centauri
- Space Night
- Kunst und Krempel
- Unter unserem Himmel (Under our Skies)
- Café Meineid
- Zur Freiheit ("To Freedom")
- Melodien der Berge

== Advertising ==
BR's TV channel, Bayerisches Fernsehen (Bavarian Television), as with all regional "Third Channel" broadcasters (along with public specialty channels such as arte, 3Sat, KI.KA, Phoenix and ARD-alpha) carry no commercials. Advertising is also not permitted on ARD's "Das Erste" or on ZDF on Sundays, national holidays, or on any day after 8:00pm. On weekdays, only 20 minutes of advertising is permitted, split between breaks between programs. Program sponsoring is not considered to be advertising, and is not subject to these restrictions.

== Studios ==
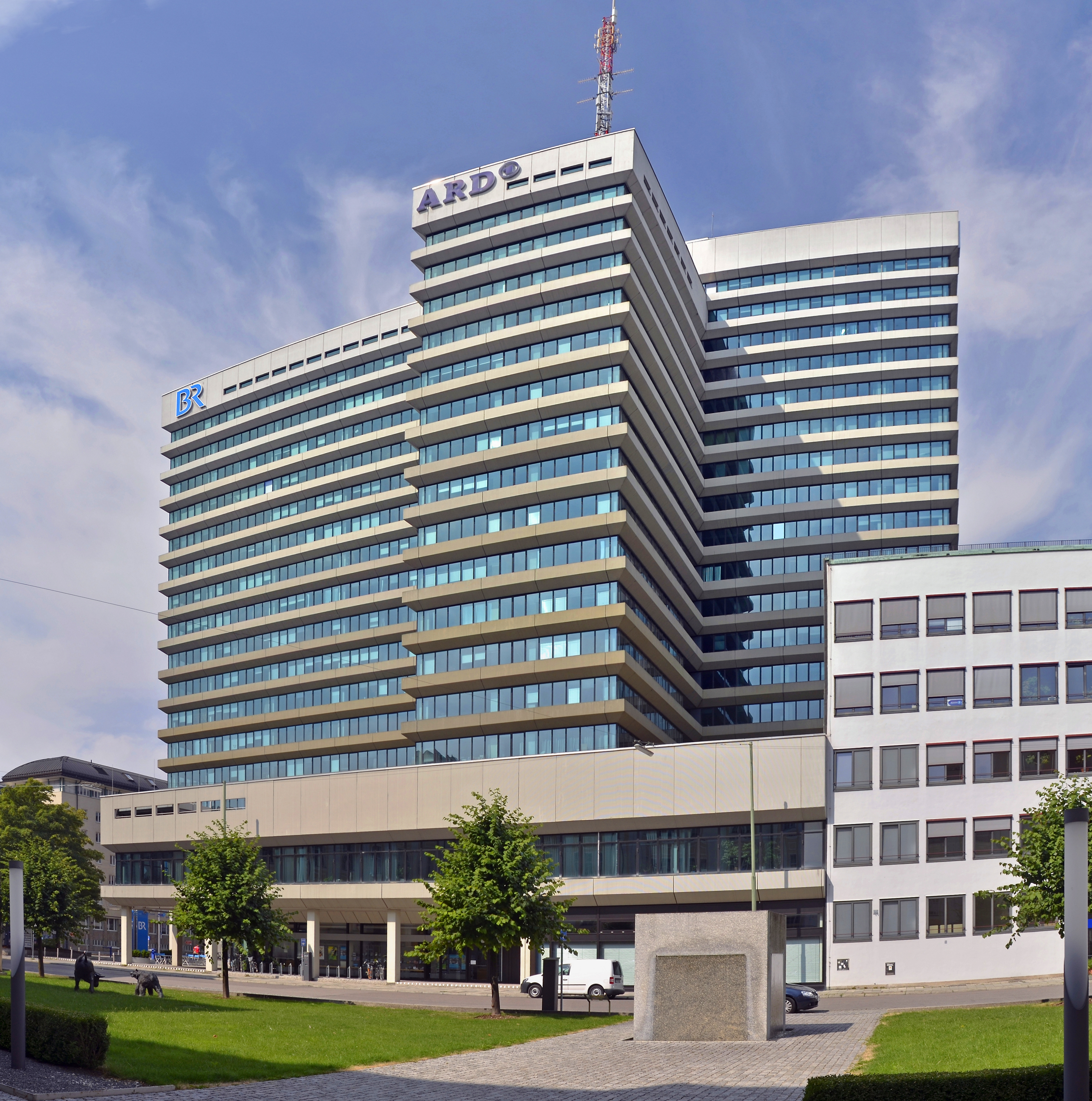
BR's headquarters in Munich

BR operates a main broadcasting facility in downtown Munich as well as studios in Munich's northern Freimann quarter and the nearby municipality of Unterföhring. There are also regional TV and radio studios in Nuremberg ("Studio Franconia"), Würzburg ("Regional Studio Franconia/River Main") and Regensburg ("Regional Studio East Bavaria").

== Programming ==
BR provides programs to various TV and radio networks, some done in collaboration with other broadcasters, and others completely independently.

=== Television channels ===
- BR Fernsehen – Regional TV channel for Bavaria
- ARD-alpha – educational programming

These two are genuine BR television channels; in addition, BR contributes to the following channels:

- Das Erste – BR contributes programming to Germany's main network's (ARD) national channel
- Phoenix – collaborative network programming between the ARD and ZDF
- KiKA – Children's network from the ARD and ZDF
- arte – Franco-German cultural network
- 3sat – Cultural network from the ARD, ZDF, ORF (Austrian Broadcasting), and SRG (Swiss Broadcasting)

=== Radio channels ===
- Bayern 1 – Popular music and information, with a target audience of adults over 35
- Bayern 2 – Spoken word (news, background to the news, documentaries, radio plays), and some music output (alternative music, jazz, folk)
- Bayern 3 – Pop music, targeting a younger audience, traffic information
- BR-Klassik – Classical music, live opera relays, music documentaries
- BR24 – Monday through Saturday: Rolling news (updated every 15 minutes); Sunday: 25-minute thematic programs (culture, politics, science, sports...), some of them reviews of the week before, interrupted by news and traffic update every 30 minutes; on some holidays (Christmas, Easter Monday ...): half-hour programs Notizen aus... (Notes from...) on regions around the world. ARD-Infonacht takes over the midnight-6am timeslot.

A further three channels are available via Digital Audio Broadcasting, digital satellite, cable, and internet streaming:

- BR Schlager – Oldies, folk music, and information for older listeners
- BR24live – Basically a relay of BR24, but breaking away where necessary to provide extended coverage of live events
- BR Heimat – Bavarian folk music, documentaries on tradition and culture

From 1998 to 2008, BR operated Bayern mobil, which existed as part of a DAB pilot project. Livestreamed content is available internationally.

== Musical organizations ==
BR administers three musical organizations:

- Symphonieorchester des Bayerischen Rundfunks (Bavarian Radio Symphony Orchestra), founded in 1949. Music directors have included Eugen Jochum, Rafael Kubelík, Sir Colin Davis and Lorin Maazel. Mariss Jansons served in this role from 2003 until his death on 30 November 2019.
- Münchner Rundfunkorchester (Munich Radio Orchestra), founded in the 1920s, reorganized in 1952. The orchestra is known for its Sunday concerts, and youth/children's concerts. In 2005, the orchestra was threatened with dissolution in 2006, but ultimately survived, albeit reduced in size from 72 to 50 musicians. Marcello Viotti gave up his post as music director, but continued to conduct the orchestra. He died on 16 February 2005 as a result of a stroke suffered during a performance of Manon.
- Chor des Bayerischen Rundfunks (Bavarian Radio Choir), founded in 1946 as "Rundfunkchor München" (Munich Radio Choir). The choir has premiered works by Rafael Kubelík and Hans Pfitzner. Peter Dijkstra has been artistic director.

== Transmitters ==
Transmitter	FM	DVB-T2	DAB+
Ismaning	Yes	No	Yes
Dillberg	Yes	Yes	Yes
Würzburg	Yes	Yes	Yes
Olympic Tower – Munich	No	Yes	Yes
Nürnberg	No	Yes	Yes
Hof	No	No	Yes
Wendelstein	Yes	Yes	Yes
Kreuzberg (Rhön)	Yes	Yes	Yes
Grünten	Yes	Yes	Yes
Brotjacklriegel	Yes	Yes	Yes
Hohen Bogen	Yes	Yes	Yes
Hohe Linie	Yes	Yes	Yes
Ochsenkopf	Yes	Yes	Yes
Büttelberg	Yes	Yes	Yes
Pfaffenberg	Yes	Yes	Yes
Hohenpeißenberg	Yes	Yes	Yes
Hühnerberg	Yes	Yes	Yes
Coburg	Yes	Yes	Yes
Augsburg	Yes	Yes	Yes
Hochberg	Yes	Yes	Yes
Gelbelsee	Yes	Yes	Yes

=== Podcasts ===
An ever-increasing number of podcasts produced by BR are available. This includes podcasts by both Bayerisches Fernsehen and the radio stations.

== Managing directors ==
Managing directors of BR since 1945:

- Field Horine (chief of section, Radio Munich) – 1945–1947
- Edmund Schechter – 1947
- Rudolf von Scholtz – 1947–1956
- Franz Stadelmayer – 1956–1960
- Christian Wallenreiter – 1960–1972
- Reinhold Vöth – 1972–1990
- Albert Scharf – 1990–2002
- Thomas Gruber – 2002–2011
- Ulrich Wilhelm – 2011–2021
- Katja Wildermuth – since 2021

== Opt-outs ==
In the 1970s, Bayerischer Rundfunk was notorious for opting out of national ARD television broadcasts when certain broadcast programmes were deemed too controversial or otherwise inappropriate.

The best-known opt outs include:

- Sesamstraße (the German version of Sesame Street) was deemed "too fast and too American" by Bavarian broadcasting authorities when it started on German TV in 1973. However, the exclusion did not last long.
- Rosa von Praunheim's 1970 movie Nicht der Homosexuelle ist pervers, sondern die Situation in der er lebt was not broadcast through BR's transmitters, as the subject matter was deemed inappropriate for a Bavarian audience.
- Die Konsequenz – a Wolfgang Petersen made-for-TV movie about a homosexual love affair. Bayerischer Rundfunk boycotted the network premiere on ARD on 8 November 1977.
- The last opt-outs took place in 1982 when the political cabaret (satire) program Scheibenwischer criticized the construction of the Rhine–Main–Danube Canal and in 1986, when the program commented on the Chernobyl disaster. Both programs were performed on a Munich theatre stage (Kammerspiele) or shown as videos to small audiences (e.g. at local SPD groups) a few days after the broadcast. And both programs are now constantly available in the BR Mediathek – as the leader of the Scheibenwischer cast, Dieter Hildebrandt, is deemed a legend in his field.

Except for Scheibenwischer (these programs have never been rebroadcast in full), all opt-outs have since been shown on BR's TV channel, Bayerisches Fernsehen, and after the introduction of satellite and internet TV Bayerischer Rundfunk no longer opts out of national broadcasts.

== See also ==
- Bit, byte, gebissen (radio program)
- BR-Radltour
- Thomas Gaitanides
- Rainer Maria Schießler, talk show Pfarrer Schießler
- Television in Germany
- Do Not Track, a 2015 BR co-produced web documentary
