= 261 AM =

AM radio frequency

No official radio stations broadcast on AM frequency 261 kHz:

== Inactive ==
- Germany: Formerly Radio Wolga and Radioropa Info from Burg
- Bulgaria: Formerly Radio Horizont
- Russia: Formerly Radio Rossii

== Former ==
- France: NRJ on Longwave (Switched off in Late 2010s)

== Proposed ==
The Burg AM transmitter in Germany to be used by Europe 1 to transmit traffic information.

== Unofficial ==
A station called Radio Luxemburg was heard on 261 kHz in December 2016.
