= Hôtel de Ville, La Roche-sur-Yon =

Town hall in La Roche-sur-Yon, France

Hôtel de Ville
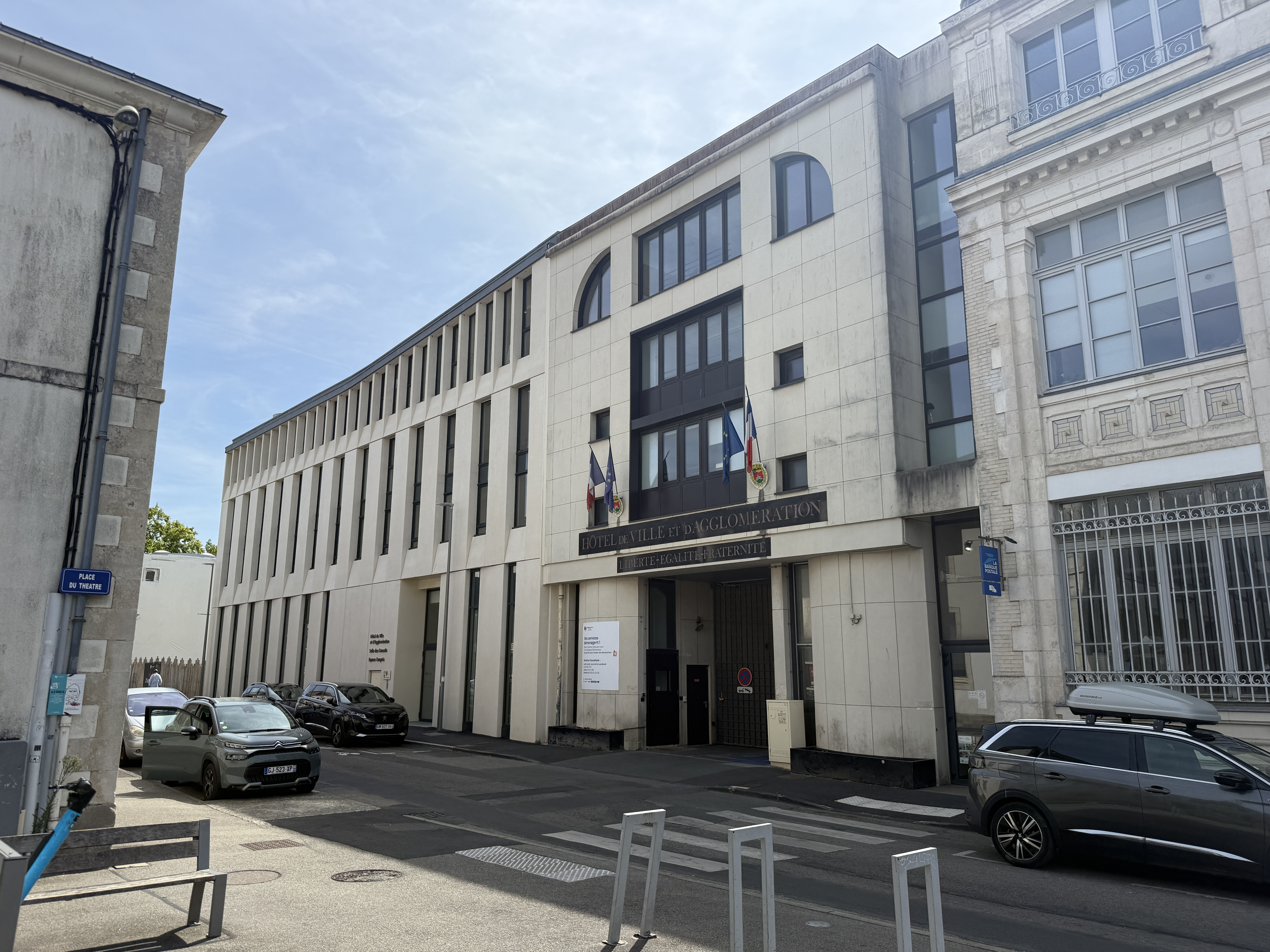
- The main frontage of the Hôtel de Ville in August 2026
- Interactive map of the Hôtel de Ville area

General information
- Type: City hall
- Architectural style: Modern style
- Location: La Roche-sur-Yon, France
- Coordinates: 46.6706°N 1.4287°W
- Completed: 2025

Design and construction
- Architect: Richez Associés

The Hôtel de Ville (French pronunciation: [otɛl də vil], City Hall) is a municipal building in La Roche-sur-Yon, Vendée, western France, standing on Place Napoléon. It is due to be replaced by a new municipal building on the corner of Jean Jaurès and Rue Salvador Allende in 2025.

== History ==
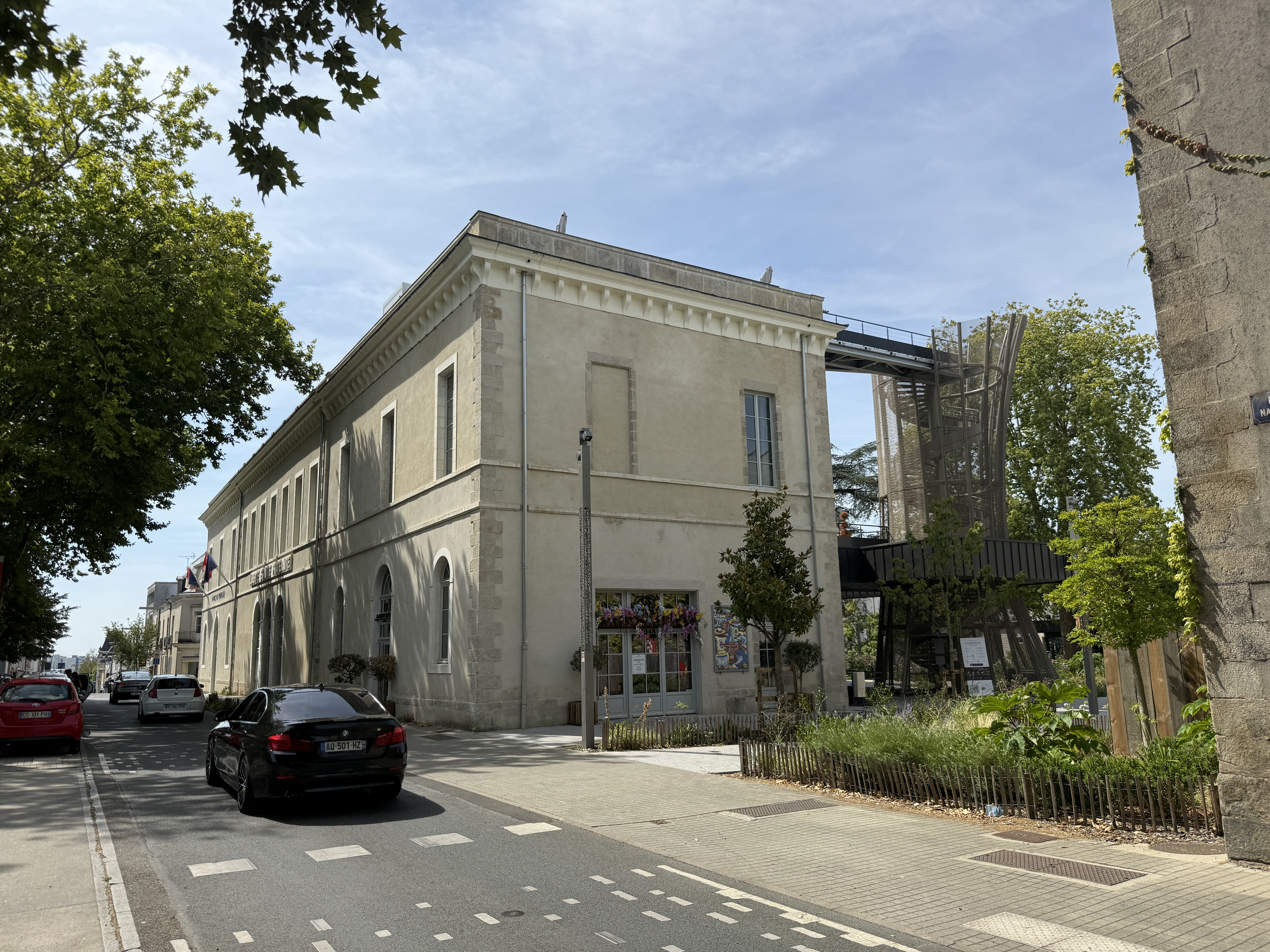
The old town hall

The first town hall was commissioned by the town council at the insistence of the emperor Napoleon who visited the town in 1808. The site they selected was on the southwest side of the central parade ground (now Place Napoléon). Construction of the building started in 1813. It was designed in the neoclassical style, built in brick with a cement render finish and was completed in 1814.

The design involved a symmetrical main frontage of 13 bays facing onto the central square. The central section of seven bays featured a short flight of steps leading up to three round-headed doorways; there were seven tall casement windows on the first floor. The wings, of three bays each, were originally single storey and were fenestrated by three round headed windows. There were two bands between the floors and, at roof level, there was a modillioned cornice. Internally, the Salle du Conseil (council chamber) and committee rooms were in the main section, while the wings accommodated offices for the administration of the schools, aid for the poor and areas for the issue of official documents to members of the public. The wings were expanded by the addition of an extra storey in 1840, giving the whole structure its current uniform appearance with 13 tall casement windows on the first floor. The interior was redecorated in 1870, with new fireplaces, murals, and a tapestry by Pierre Chapuis. A bust of the painter, Paul-Jacques-Aimé Baudry, was installed there in 1895.

Following significant population growth, largely associated with the status of La Roche-sur-Yon as a market town, the council, led by the mayor, Paul Caillaud, decided to commission a large extension at the rear of the original building. The new structure, which incorporated extensive use of smoked glass curtain walling, was completed in 1969.

In July 2019, the town council announced that the municipal staff would be relocating to a former post office on the corner of Jean Jaurès and Rue Salvador Allende. The converted post office would contain a Salle de Mariages (wedding room), an assembly hall, and an atrium. It was also announced that a new exhibition space, the Musée Espace Napoléon (the Museum about Napoleon), would be created in a former courthouse, originally designed by Claude-Raphaël Duvivier in the neoclassical style, and completed on an adjacent site on the corner of Rue Salvador Allende and Place Napoléon in 1815. The foundation stone for the new complex was laid by the mayor, Luc Bouard, on 19 September 2023. It was confirmed that the conversion work would be carried out at a cost of €30 million (€16 million for the municipal elements, and €14 million for the museum), to a design by Richez Associés. The municipal elements of the building were scheduled to open in 2025, while the museum was scheduled to open in 2028.

Meanwhile, it was announced that the town hall on Place Napoléon would be renovated so that it could accommodate a tourist information centre, a bar and some shops.
