= Hermann Riedel =

German composer

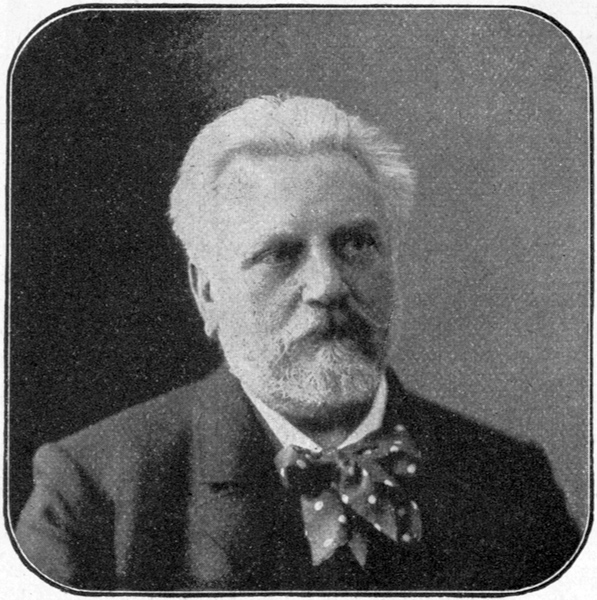
Hermann Riedel

Hermann Riedel (b. 1847 Burg bei Magdeburg, d. 6 October 1913 Braunschweig) was a German composer.

Riedel studied piano and composition at the Vienna Conservatory with Josef Dachs and Felix Otto Dessoff. In 1874, he became a pianist correpetiteur at the Vienna Hofoper. In 1878, he settled in Braunschweig, where he was made music director of the Royal Opera. From 1882 to 1911, he was Kapellmeister of the Braunschweig court orchestra and director of the court theatre ensemble.

Riedel is most notable as the author of Der Trompeter von Säkkingen (The Trumpeter of Säckingen), a cycle of songs written to a popular epic poem by Joseph Victor von Scheffel. He also composed the comic opera Der Ritterschlag (The Knight's Dubbing), as well as a series of works of chamber music.
