= Radioropa Info =

German longwave radio station

Radioropa Info was the name of various German-language privately owned longwave radio stations. They were mainly active in the 1990s, with break in the middle of the decade.

Radioropa was initially only available on satellite. It then began using time on the Radio Wolga longwave service on 261 kHz at the Burg AM transmitter in Burg bei Magdeburg, Saxony-Anhalt. Radioropa then obtained FM frequencies in Rhineland-Palatinate and Saxony. When the Soviet army withdrew from the former East Germany in 1994, Radioropa took over 261 kHz completely. Longwave transmission stopped during 1994/1995 because the cost of renting transmission time was too high. After a new contract with Deutsche Telekom was negotiated, Radioropa resumed broadcasting on longwave.

Radioropa Info broadcast news. Later it mainly rebroadcast programmes supplied by other stations. Since listenership on longwave and satellite radio was too low, Radioropa Info applied for FM frequencies at the end of the 1990s. FM licenses were not granted and Radioropa Info went out of business on 31 December 2000.

In 2002, Europe 1 requested permission to use the 261 kHz frequency for a new radio station for motorists and truckers; as of 2009, this request has not been granted.
