= Burg bei Magdeburg =

Burg
- Town
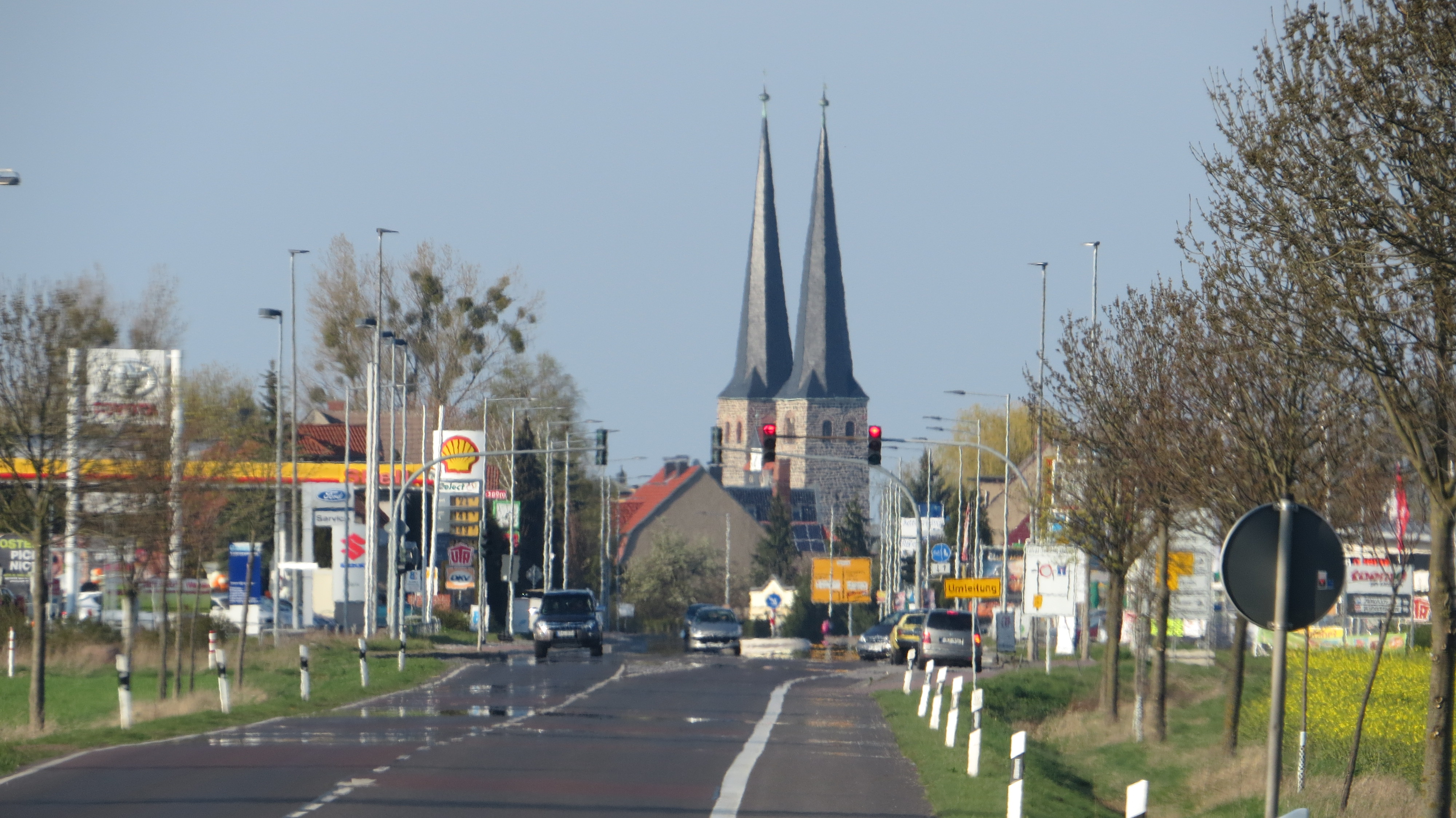

- Coat of arms

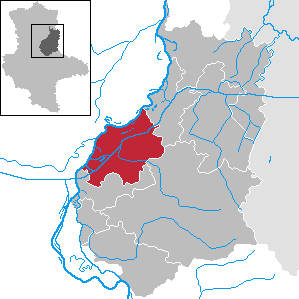
- Location of Burg within Jerichower Land district
- Interactive map of Burg
- Location within Germany Location within Saxony-Anhalt
- Coordinates: 52°16′21″N 11°51′18″E
- Country: Germany
- State: Saxony-Anhalt
- District: Jerichower Land
- Subdivisions: 9

Government
  - Mayor (2021–28): Philipp Stark (SPD)

Area
  - Total: 164.02 km^{2} (63.33 sq mi)
- Elevation: 54 m (177 ft)

Population (2025-12-31)
  - Total: 22,838
  - Density: 139.24/km^{2} (360.63/sq mi)
- Time zone: UTC+01:00 (CET)
  - Summer (DST): UTC+02:00 (CEST)
- Postal codes: 39288
- Dialling codes: 03921
- Vehicle registration: JL
- Website: www.stadtburg.info

Burg (German pronunciation: [bʊʁk]; also known as Burg bei Magdeburg to distinguish from other places with the same name) is a town of about 22,400 inhabitants on the Elbe–Havel Canal in northeastern Germany, 25 km (16 mi) northeast of Magdeburg. It is the capital of the Jerichower Land district in the state of Saxony-Anhalt.

The town is known for its mediaeval churches and towers. Due to the numerous towers and steeples Burg also carries the sobriquet City of Towers. Like other German towns and cities, Burg shows its connection to the Roland saga with a statue, which was restored in 1999.

== Etymology ==
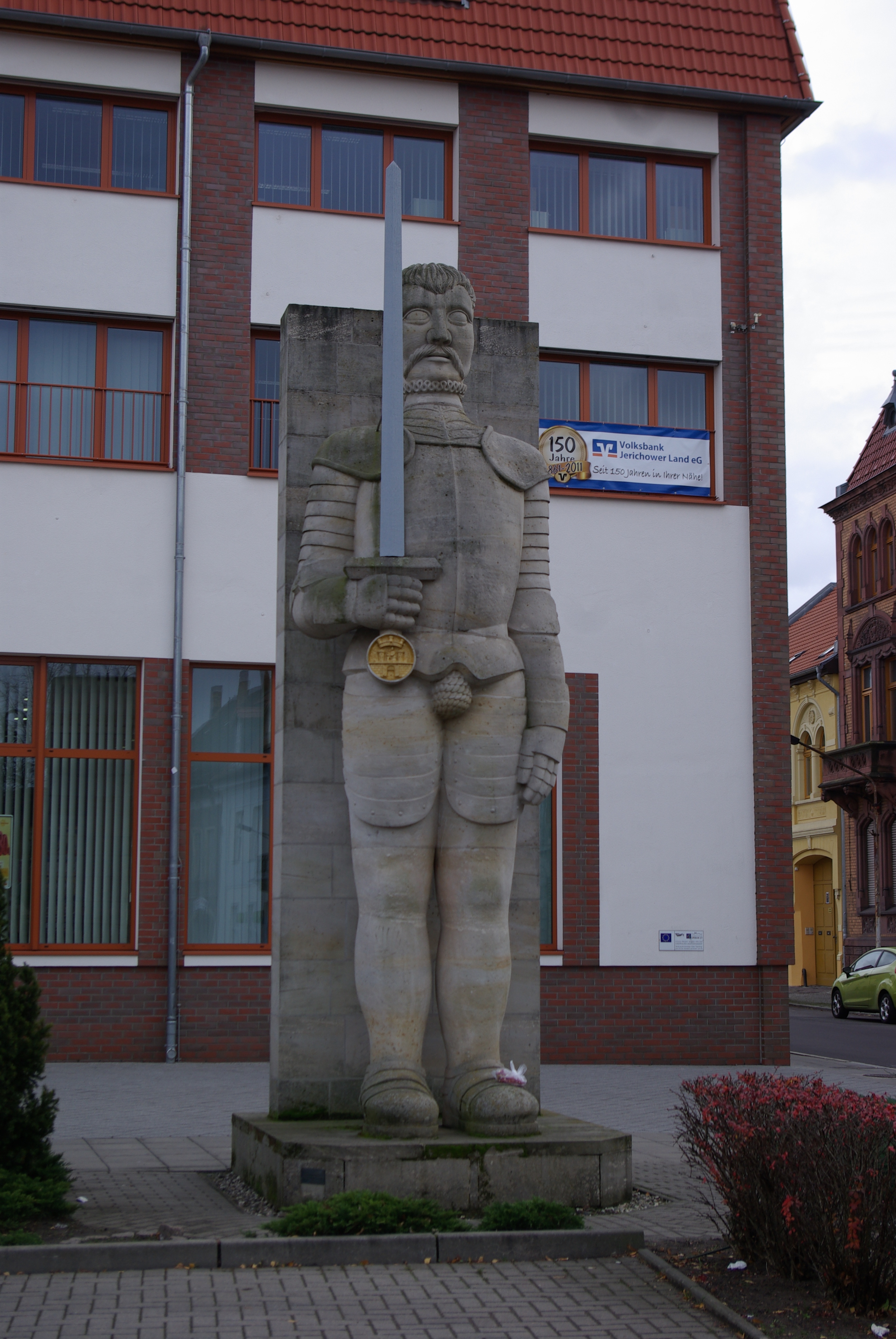
Statue of Roland, reproduction of the one from 1581

Although the name Burg has the same form as the German word Burg (castle), it is more likely that the name comes from the Slavic word bor, meaning coniferous forest.

== Subdivisions ==
The municipality Burg bei Magdeburg consists of the town Burg bei Magdeburg and the formerly independent municipalities Detershagen, Ihleburg, Niegripp, Parchau, Schartau and Reesen.

== Economy ==
Burg formerly had the largest shoe manufacturing factory in Europe and was the first to produce manufactured crispbread in Germany, beginning production in 1931.

== Twin towns – sister cities ==
Burg is twinned with:

- Afantou, Greece
- Gummersbach, Germany
- La Roche-sur-Yon, France
- Tira, Israel

== Notable people ==
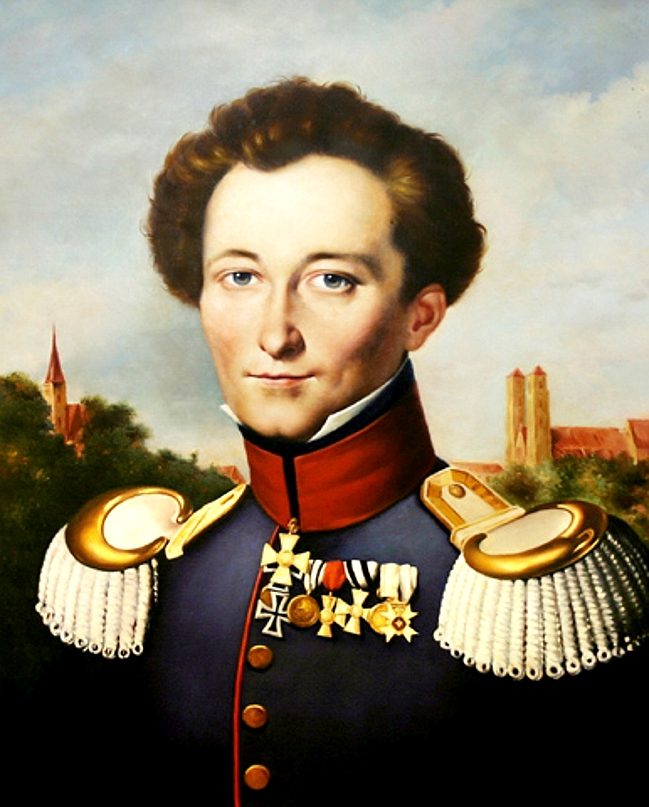
Carl von Clausewitz

- Heiko Balz (born 1969), wrestler
- Julia Bonk (born 1986), politician (The Left), Member of Landtag (Saxony)
- Joachim a Burck (1546–1610), composer
- Carl von Clausewitz (1780–1831), Prussian general and important military theorist
- Hermann Eggert (1844–1920), architect
- Harald Jährling (1954–2023), rower
- Ferdinand Kurlbaum (1857–1927), physicist
- Hermann Paasche (1851–1925), politician (DVP)
- Emanuel Raasch (1955–2026), cyclist
- Brigitte Reimann (1933–1973), writer
- Hermann Riedel (1847–1913), composer and conductor
- Wolfgang Seguin (born 1945), footballer

== Transmitter ==
Near Burg there is a large transmission site for long- and mediumwave, which was among other things used for the transmissions of Radio Wolga.
