= La Roche-sur-Yon =

- Prefecture and commune
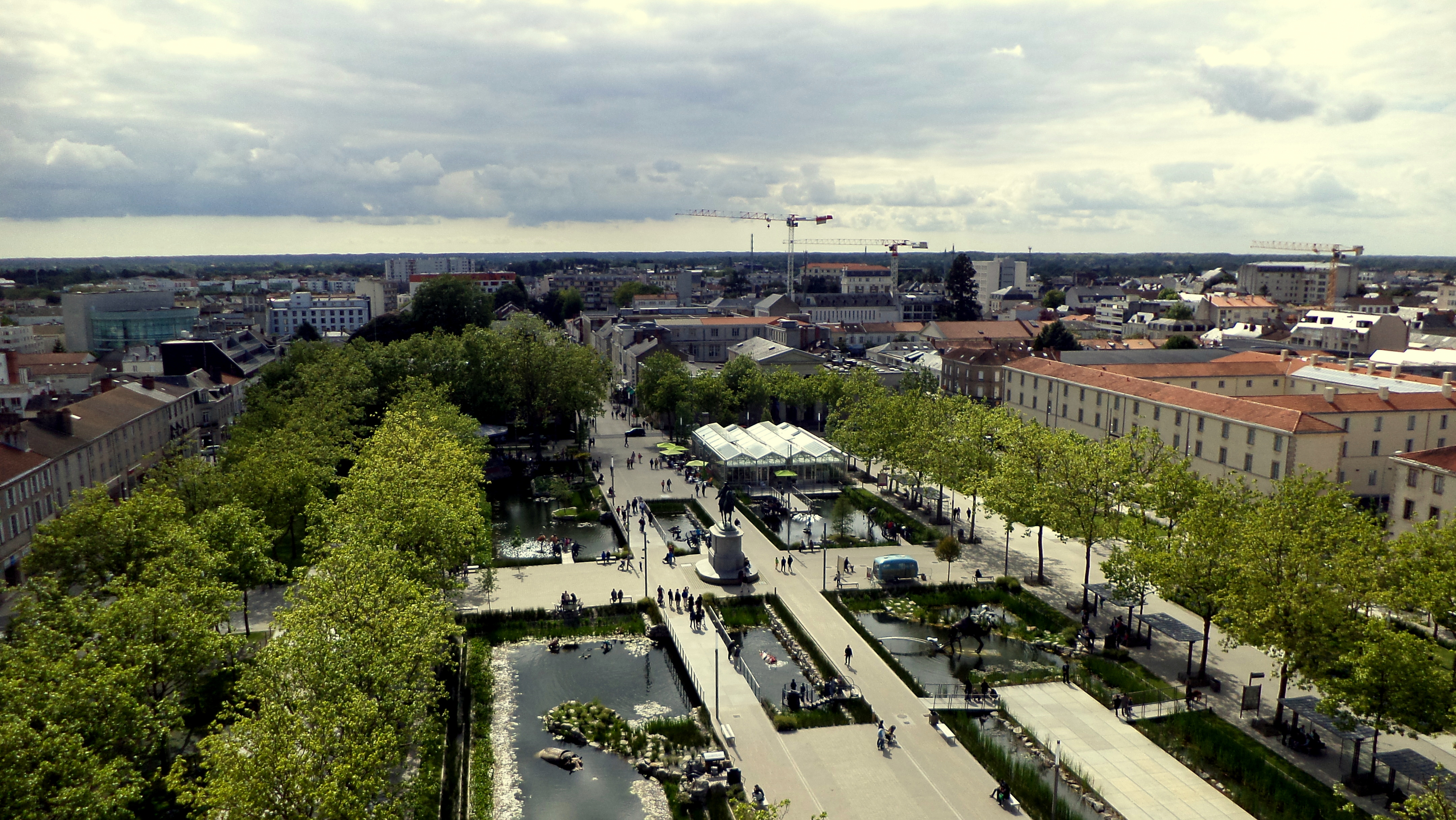
- Square Napoléon (Place Napoléon)

- Coat of arms
- Location of La Roche-sur-Yon
- Location within France Location within Pays de la Loire
- Coordinates: 46°40′14″N 1°25′34″W
- Country: France
- Region: Pays de la Loire
- Department: Vendée
- Arrondissement: La Roche-sur-Yon
- Canton: La Roche-sur-Yon-1 and 2
- Intercommunality: La Roche-sur-Yon Agglomération

Government
  - Mayor (2020–2026): Luc Bouard
- Area^{1}: 87.52 km^{2} (33.79 sq mi)
- Elevation: 74 m (243 ft)
- Highest elevation: 94 m (308 ft)
- Lowest elevation: 32 m (105 ft)
- Population (2023): 54,849
  - Density: 626.7/km^{2} (1,623/sq mi)
- Time zone: UTC+01:00 (CET)
  - Summer (DST): UTC+02:00 (CEST)
- INSEE/Postal code: 85191 /85000
- ^{1} French Land Register data, which excludes lakes, ponds, glaciers > 1 km^{2} (0.386 sq mi or 247 acres) and river estuaries.

La Roche-sur-Yon (pronounced [la ʁɔʃ syʁ jɔ̃]) is a commune in the Vendée department in the Pays de la Loire region in western France. It is the capital of the department. The demonym for its inhabitants is Yonnais.

== History ==
The town expanded significantly after Napoleon I chose the site as the new préfecture of the Vendée on 25 May 1804 to replace Fontenay-le-Comte (then under its revolutionary name of Fontenay-le-Peuple). At the time, most of La Roche had been eradicated in the War in the Vendée (1793–96); the renamed Napoléonville was laid out and a fresh population of soldiers and civil servants was brought in. Napoléonville was designed to accommodate 15,000 people. The Hôtel de Ville (town hall) was established on the southwestern side of Place Napoléon in 1814.

The town was called successively:

- La Roche-sur-Yon (during the Ancien Régime and the French First Republic)
- Napoléon-sur-Yon (during the First French Empire)
- Bourbon-Vendée (during the French Restoration)
- Napoléon-Vendée (during the French Second Empire)

== Geography ==
The river Yon flows southward through the commune and crosses the town.

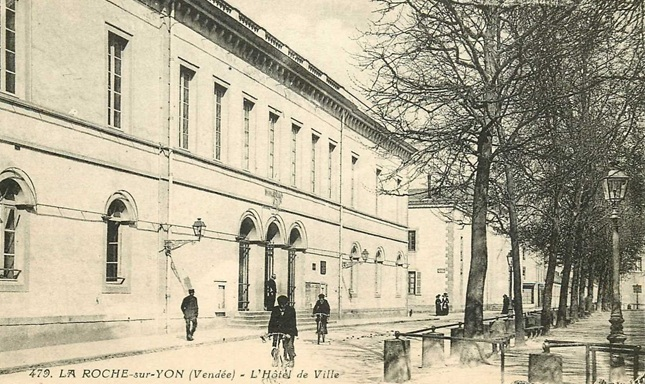
The Hôtel de Ville (town hall) of 1814

=== Climate ===
La Roche-sur-Yon has an oceanic climate (Köppen climate classification Cfb). The average annual temperature in La Roche-sur-Yon is 12.4 °C (54.3 °F). The average annual rainfall is 885.5 mm (34.86 in) with November as the wettest month. The temperatures are highest on average in August, at around 19.5 °C (67.1 °F), and lowest in January, at around 6.1 °C (43.0 °F). The highest temperature ever recorded in La Roche-sur-Yon was 41.5 °C (106.7 °F) on 18 July 2022; the coldest temperature ever recorded was −15.4 °C (4.3 °F) on 10 February 1986.

== Population ==
The population data in the table and graph below refer to the commune of La Roche-sur-Yon proper, in its geography at the given years. The commune of La Roche-sur-Yon absorbed the former communes of Le Bourg-sous-la-Roche-sur-Yon and Saint-André-d'Ornay in 1964.

Historical population

| Year | Pop. | ±% p.a. |
|---|---|---|
| 1800 | 1,015 | — |
| 1806 | 857 | −2.78% |
| 1821 | 2,792 | +8.19% |
| 1831 | 3,904 | +3.41% |
| 1836 | 5,257 | +6.13% |
| 1841 | 5,164 | −0.36% |
| 1846 | 6,909 | +6.00% |
| 1851 | 7,498 | +1.65% |
| 1856 | 8,178 | +1.75% |
| 1861 | 8,298 | +0.29% |
| 1866 | 8,710 | +0.97% |
| 1872 | 8,841 | +0.25% |
| 1876 | 9,755 | +2.49% |
| 1881 | 10,634 | +1.74% |
| 1886 | 11,773 | +2.06% |
| 1891 | 12,215 | +0.74% |
| 1896 | 12,710 | +0.80% |
| 1901 | 13,629 | +1.41% |

| Year | Pop. | ±% p.a. |
|---|---|---|
| 1906 | 13,685 | +0.08% |
| 1911 | 14,885 | +1.70% |
| 1921 | 13,629 | −0.88% |
| 1926 | 14,538 | +1.30% |
| 1931 | 15,247 | +0.96% |
| 1936 | 16,073 | +1.06% |
| 1946 | 18,107 | +1.20% |
| 1954 | 19,576 | +0.98% |
| 1962 | 24,019 | +2.59% |
| 1968 | 36,067 | +7.01% |
| 1975 | 44,713 | +3.12% |
| 1982 | 45,098 | +0.12% |
| 1990 | 45,219 | +0.03% |
| 1999 | 49,262 | +0.96% |
| 2007 | 51,124 | +0.46% |
| 2012 | 52,808 | +0.65% |
| 2017 | 54,372 | +0.59% |
| 2023 | 54,849 | +0.15% |

Source: EHESS and INSEE (1968-2023)

== Administration ==
La Roche-sur-Yon is the seat and main city of the intercommunality La Roche-sur-Yon Agglomération, which contains 13 communes. It is the seat (prefecture) of the Arrondissement of La Roche-sur-Yon, which covers 78 communes, and has a population of 308,745 (2023). It is also the seat of two cantons, Canton of La Roche-sur-Yon-1 and Canton of La Roche-sur-Yon-2.

== Transport ==
The Gare de La Roche-sur-Yon railway station offers connections to Nantes, Paris, Les Sables-d'Olonne, Bordeaux and several regional destinations. The A87 motorway connects La Roche-sur-Yon with Les Sables-d'Olonne and Angers, the A83 with Nantes and Niort.

The La Roche-sur-Yon - Les Ajoncs airport, is situated 5 kilometres north of the city, East of Lake "Moulin Papon". Hosts business jets (SD Aviation) and general aviation aircraft and charter flights. There are no regular airline flights.

== Education ==
=== Primary and secondary education ===
The commune has designated attendance zones for its primary schools.

Schools include:

- 2 public preschools (écoles maternelles)
- 2 public elementary schools
- 13 public school groups of combined preschools and elementary schools
- 6 private elementary schools
- Public junior high schools: Collège Auguste et Jean-Renoir, Collège mixte Les Gondoliers, Collège mixte Edouard Herriot, Collège Haxo
- Private junior high schools: Collège mixte du Sacré-Coeur, Collège mixte Richelieu, Collège mixte Saint-Louis
- Public senior high schools: Lycée Nature (general education and agricultural technology), Lycée d'état mixte Alfred-Kastler, Lycée polyvalent Jean de Lattre-de-Tassigny, Lycée polyvalent Pierre-Mendès-France, and Lycée professionnel Edoaurd Branly
- Private senior high schools: Lycée Saint-François d'Assise, Lycée d'enseignement général et technologique Notre-Dame-du-Roc, Lycée les Etablières
- One grande école : Institut catholique d'arts et métiers

=== Higher education ===
La Roche-sur-Yon is home to several higher education institutions:

- Université de Nantes — La Roche-sur-Yon Campus: An extension of the University of Nantes, this campus hosts a variety of undergraduate programs including Business Administration, Computer Science, and Law.
- IUT La Roche-sur-Yon: A part of the University Institute of Technology, it provides vocational-technical education, granting two-year diplomas in fields like Mechanical Engineering, Business and Administration Management, and Multimedia and Internet Technologies.
- ICES (Institut Catholique d'Études Supérieures): A private institution known for programs in humanities, social sciences, law, and business.

La Roche-sur-Yon also hosts several specialized educational institutions:

- École Supérieure de Design de La Roche-sur-Yon: A design school offering programs in graphic design, product design, and interaction design.
- Conservatoire à rayonnement départemental de La Roche-sur-Yon: A music, dance, and drama school providing a wide range of courses for all ages.

== Sports ==
In 2014, La Roche-sur-yon hosted the 2014 French championship of table tennis.

La Roche-sur-Yon's Vendéspace hosted one of the first round ties of the 2014 Davis Cup tennis tournament over the weekend of 31 January – 2 February 2014. France hosted Australia as both teams competed for a place in the World Group quarterfinals.

In 2015, La Roche-sur-Yon hosted the 2015 FIRS Men's Roller Hockey World Cup, the first time that a World Cup of roller hockey is held in France.

In June 2015, La Roche-sur-Yon's Vendéspace hosted the qualification tournament for the World Championships in Savate Combat.

== Climate ==
Comparison of local Meteorological data with other cities in France
| Town | Sunshine (hours/yr) | Rain (mm/yr) | Snow (days/yr) | Storm (days/yr) | Fog (days/yr) |
|---|---|---|---|---|---|
| National average | 1,973 | 770 | 14 | 22 | 40 |
| La Roche-sur-Yon | 1,922.4 | 880.7 | 4.9 | 13.1 | 56.4 |
| Paris | 1,661 | 637 | 12 | 18 | 10 |
| Nice | 2,724 | 767 | 1 | 29 | 1 |
| Strasbourg | 1,693 | 665 | 29 | 29 | 56 |
| Brest | 1,605 | 1,211 | 7 | 12 | 75 |

Climate data for La Roche-sur-Yon (1991−2020 normals, extremes 1984−present)
| Month | Jan | Feb | Mar | Apr | May | Jun | Jul | Aug | Sep | Oct | Nov | Dec | Year |
|---|---|---|---|---|---|---|---|---|---|---|---|---|---|
| Record high °C (°F) | 15.9 (60.6) | 21.6 (70.9) | 24.1 (75.4) | 28.1 (82.6) | 31.9 (89.4) | 38.8 (101.8) | 41.5 (106.7) | 38.7 (101.7) | 34.3 (93.7) | 30.5 (86.9) | 21.1 (70.0) | 18.7 (65.7) | 41.5 (106.7) |
| Mean daily maximum °C (°F) | 9.0 (48.2) | 10.1 (50.2) | 13.1 (55.6) | 15.7 (60.3) | 19.3 (66.7) | 22.8 (73.0) | 24.9 (76.8) | 25.1 (77.2) | 22.1 (71.8) | 17.3 (63.1) | 12.5 (54.5) | 9.5 (49.1) | 16.8 (62.2) |
| Daily mean °C (°F) | 6.1 (43.0) | 6.4 (43.5) | 8.8 (47.8) | 10.9 (51.6) | 14.3 (57.7) | 17.5 (63.5) | 19.4 (66.9) | 19.5 (67.1) | 16.8 (62.2) | 13.4 (56.1) | 9.2 (48.6) | 6.5 (43.7) | 12.4 (54.3) |
| Mean daily minimum °C (°F) | 3.2 (37.8) | 2.7 (36.9) | 4.4 (39.9) | 6.0 (42.8) | 9.3 (48.7) | 12.3 (54.1) | 13.9 (57.0) | 13.9 (57.0) | 11.4 (52.5) | 9.4 (48.9) | 5.9 (42.6) | 3.6 (38.5) | 8.0 (46.4) |
| Record low °C (°F) | −14.9 (5.2) | −15.4 (4.3) | −10.3 (13.5) | −4.1 (24.6) | −0.3 (31.5) | 2.8 (37.0) | 7.2 (45.0) | 5.1 (41.2) | 2.5 (36.5) | −4.5 (23.9) | −7.1 (19.2) | −9.5 (14.9) | −15.4 (4.3) |
| Average precipitation mm (inches) | 94.8 (3.73) | 70.5 (2.78) | 64.4 (2.54) | 65.9 (2.59) | 62.4 (2.46) | 45.3 (1.78) | 47.9 (1.89) | 52.1 (2.05) | 71.9 (2.83) | 98.7 (3.89) | 108.1 (4.26) | 103.5 (4.07) | 885.5 (34.86) |
| Average precipitation days (≥ 1.0 mm) | 12.6 | 10.5 | 10.3 | 10.0 | 9.5 | 7.5 | 7.4 | 7.6 | 7.9 | 12.0 | 13.3 | 13.2 | 121.8 |
| Mean monthly sunshine hours | 73.6 | 106.4 | 151.1 | 183.6 | 210.8 | 229.0 | 241.4 | 235.7 | 199.1 | 128.8 | 88.9 | 74.0 | 1,922.4 |
Source: Meteo France

== Landmarks ==
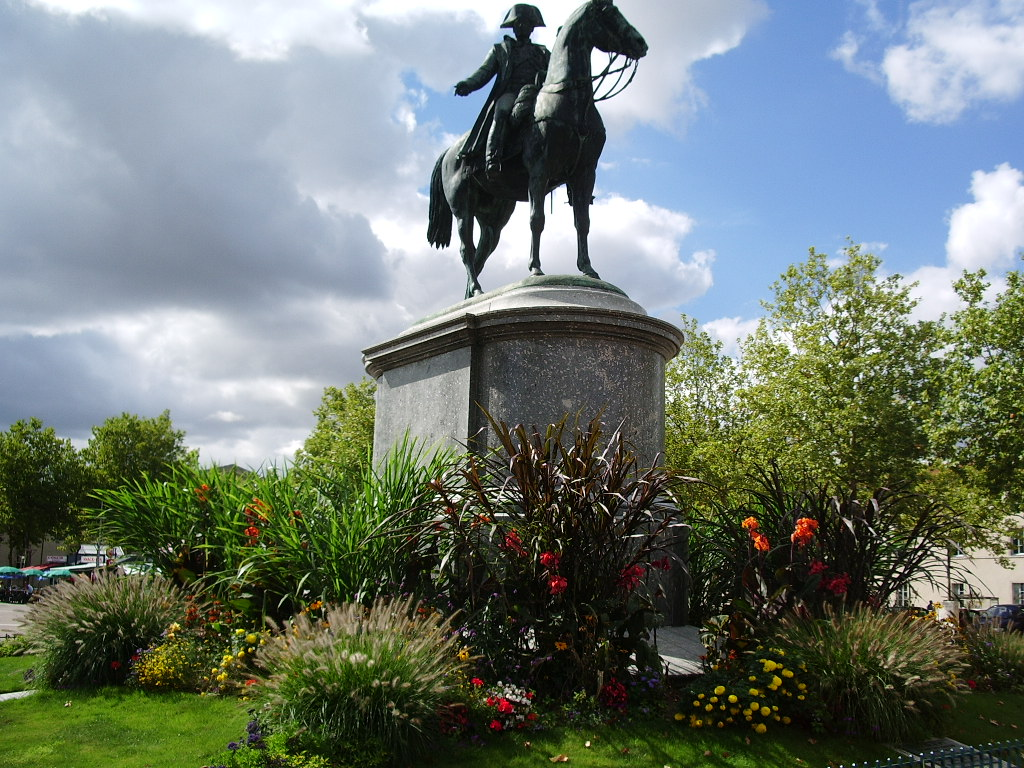
Napoléon's statue (1854)

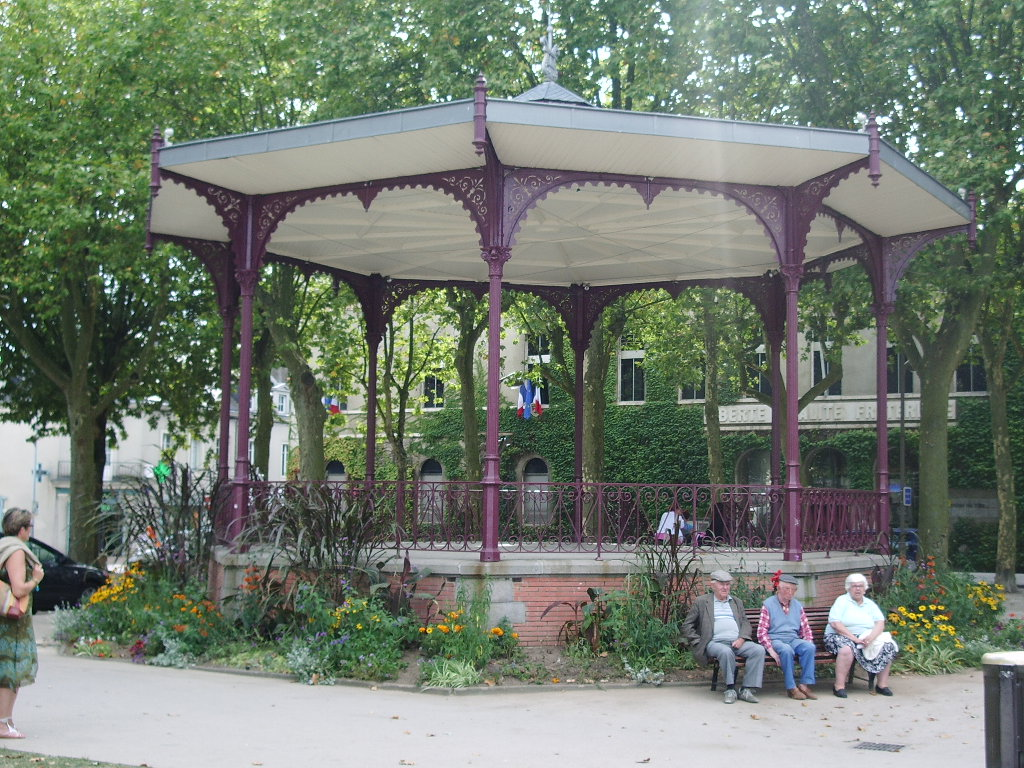
Kiosk on Napoléon square

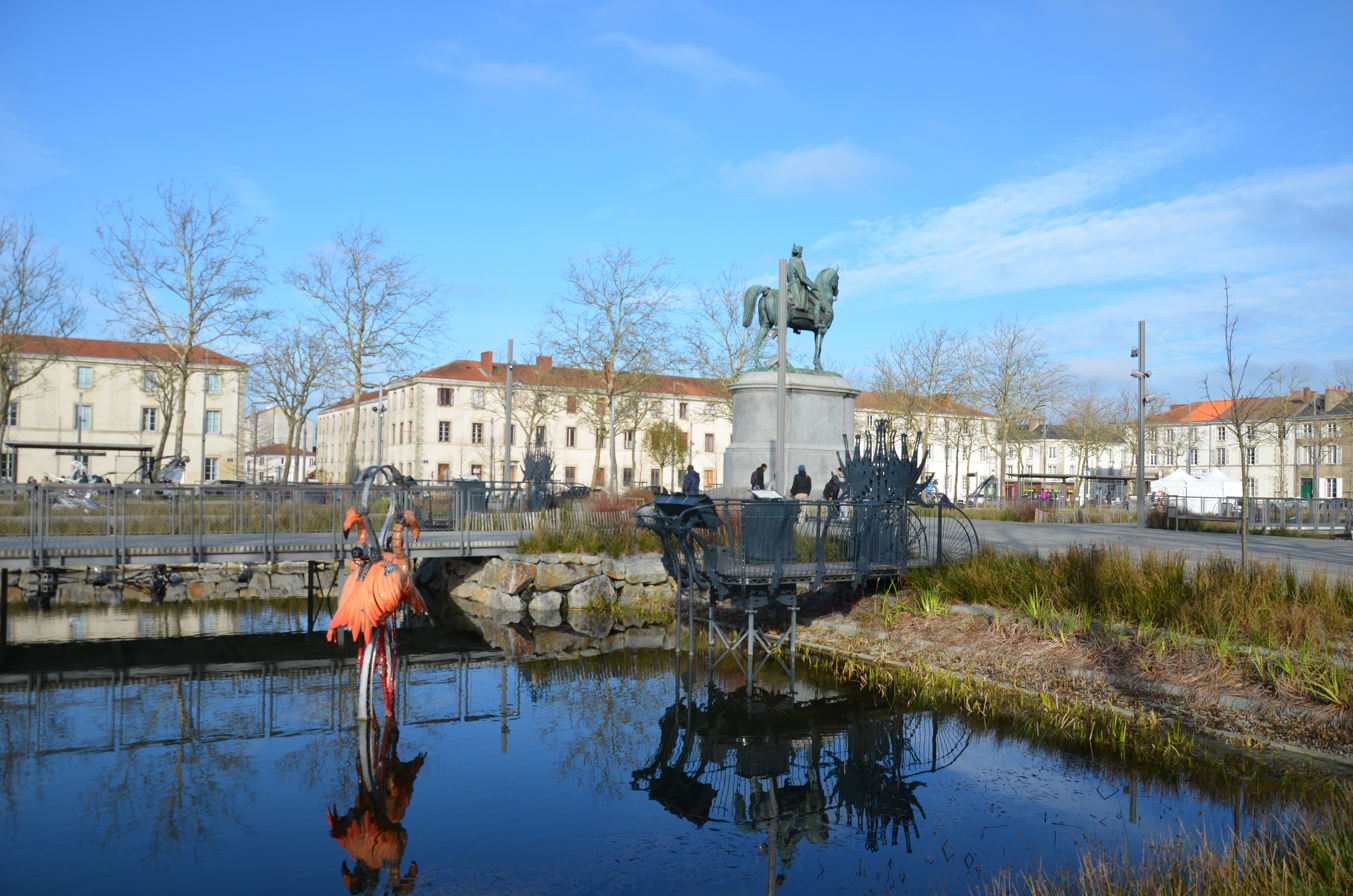
Napoléon square / Place Napoléon

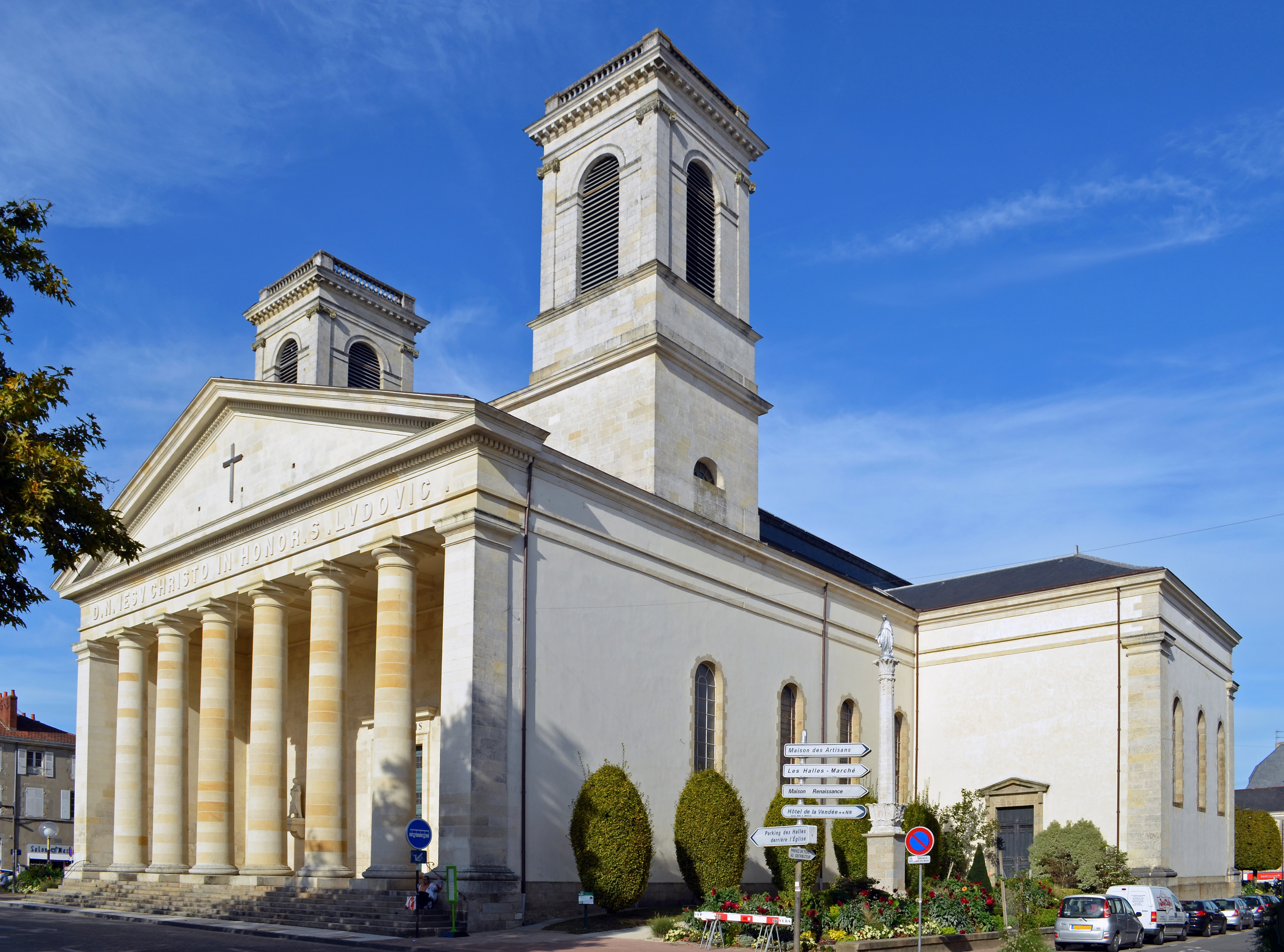
Saint-Louis church

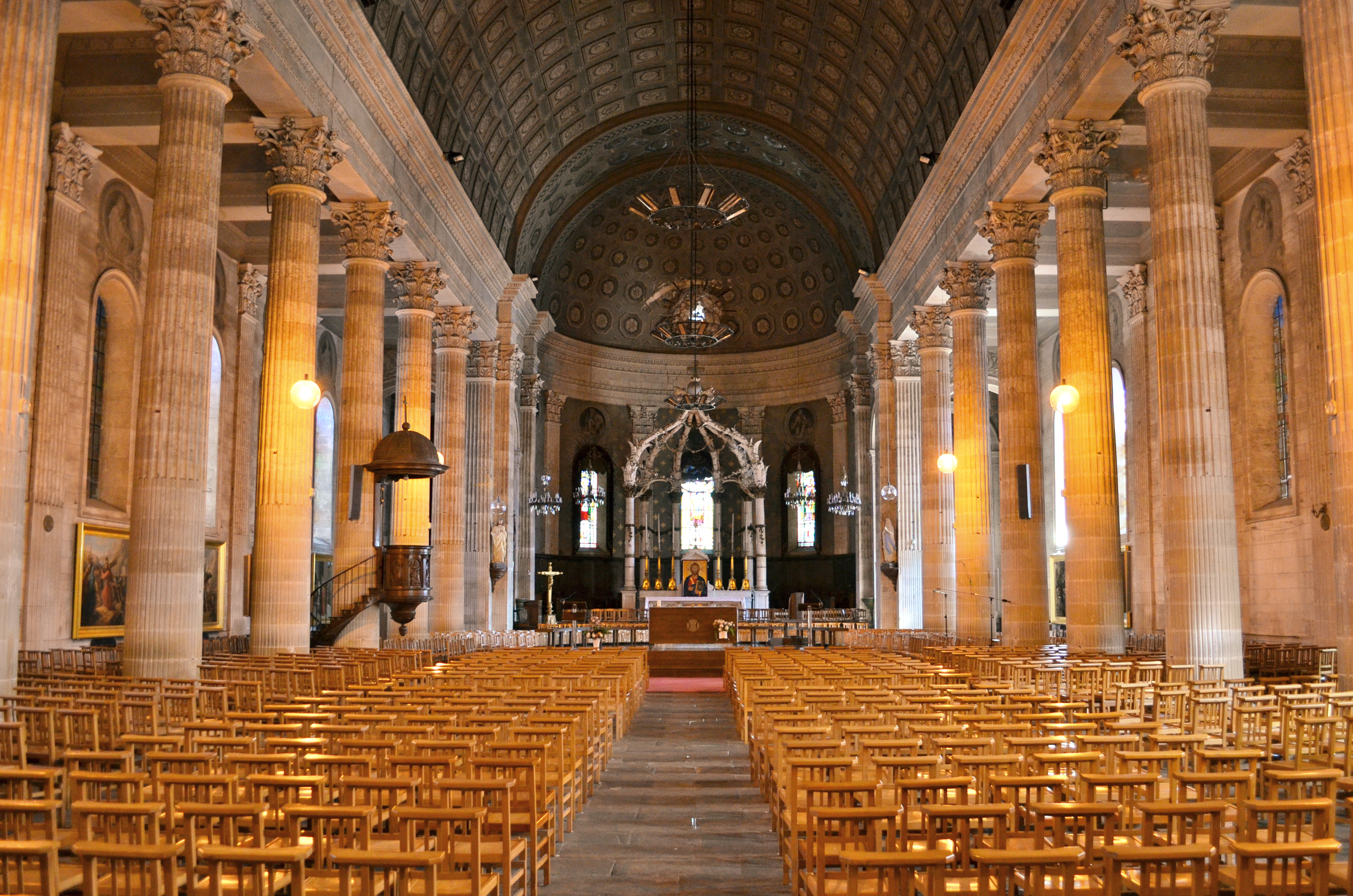
Saint-Louis church

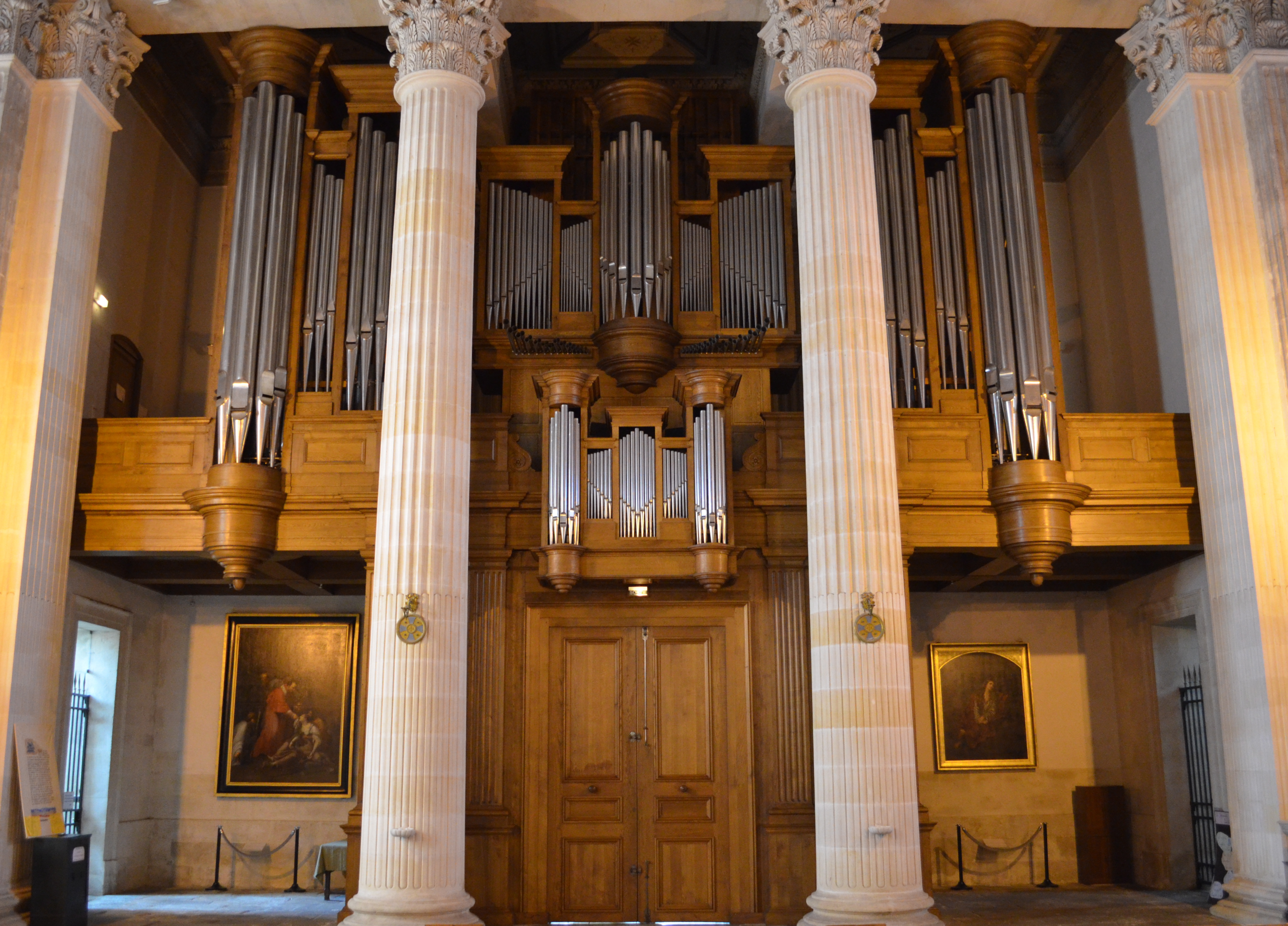
Saint-Louis church organ

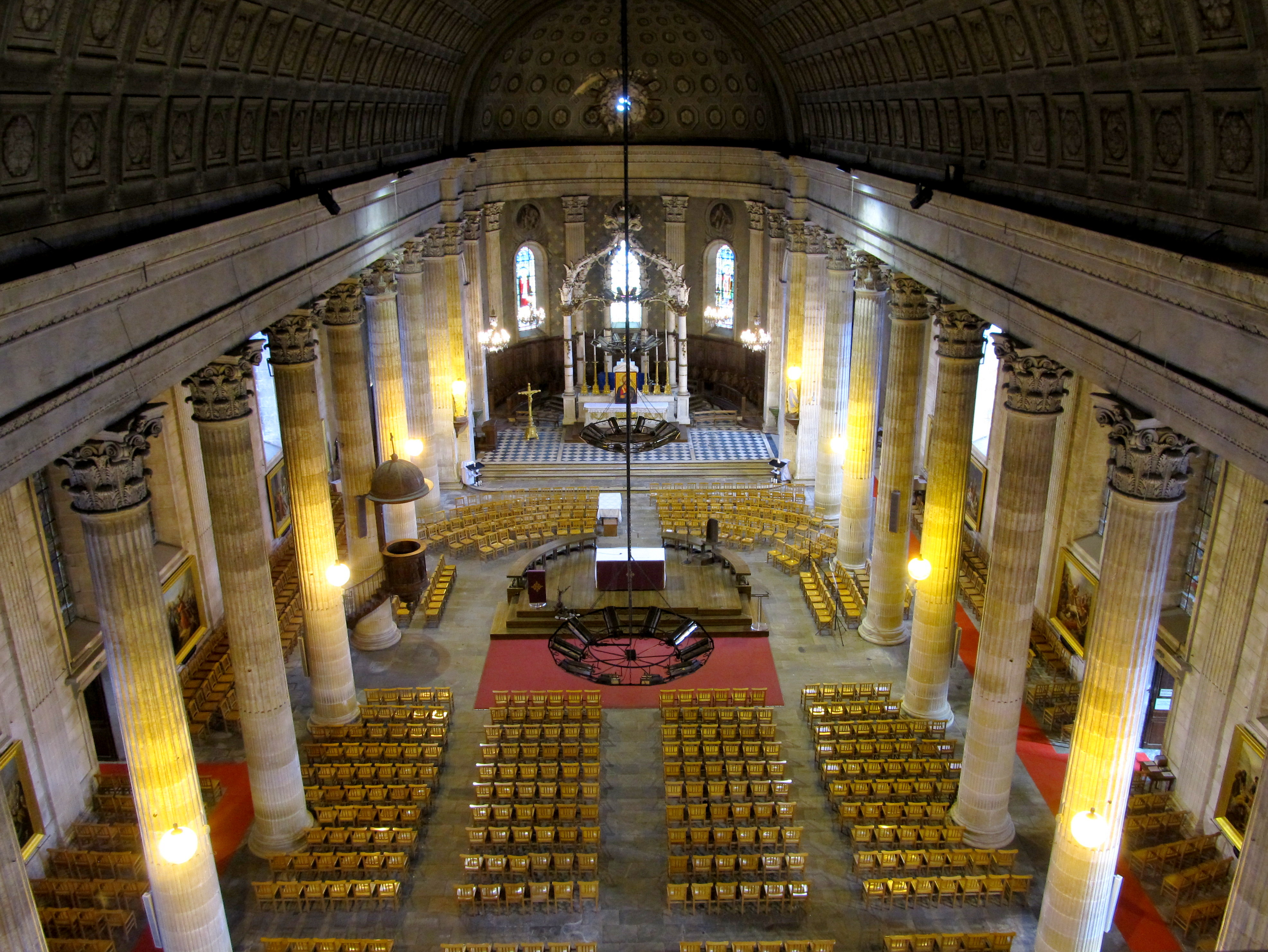
Saint Louis Church of La Roche-sur-Yon

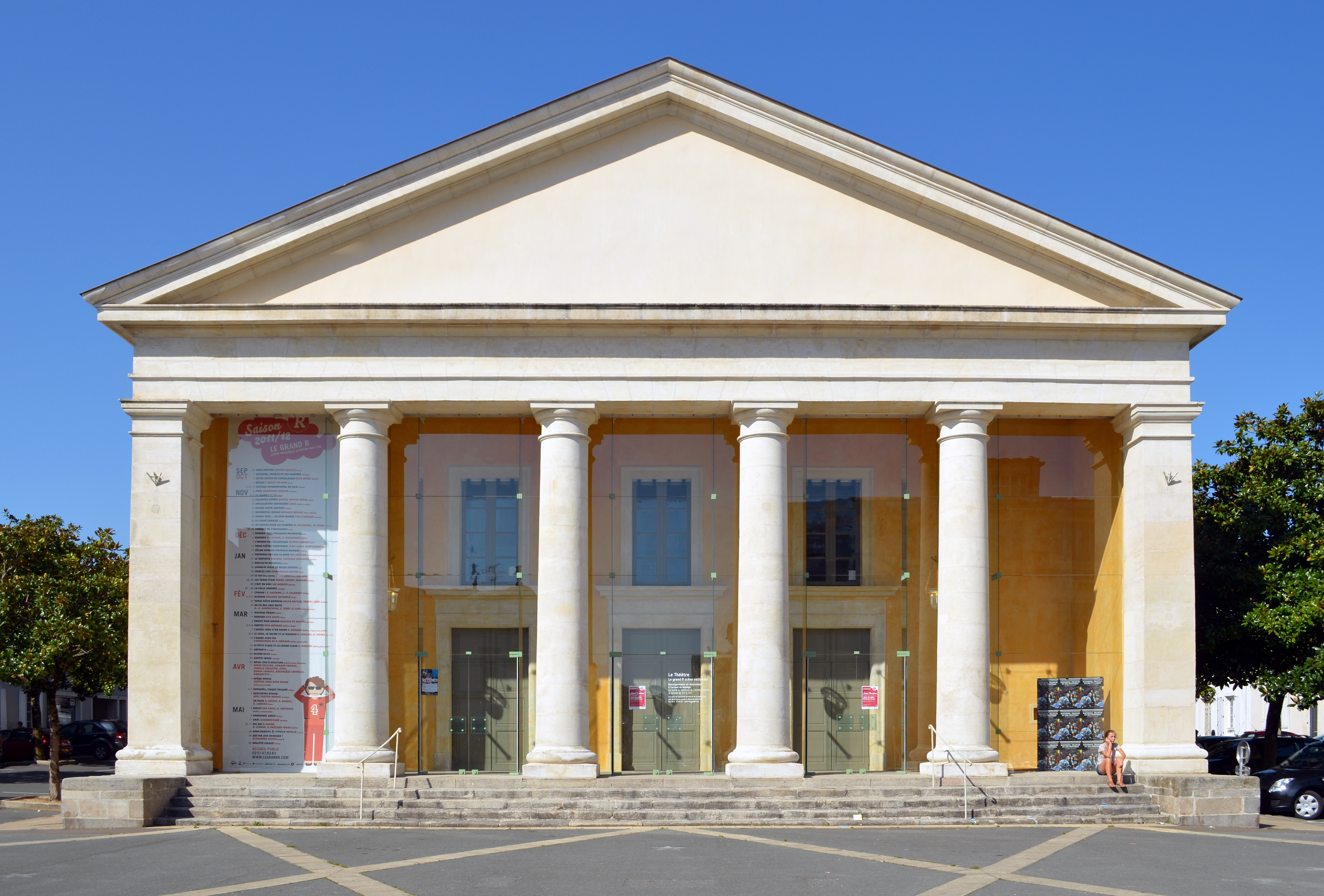
Theatre

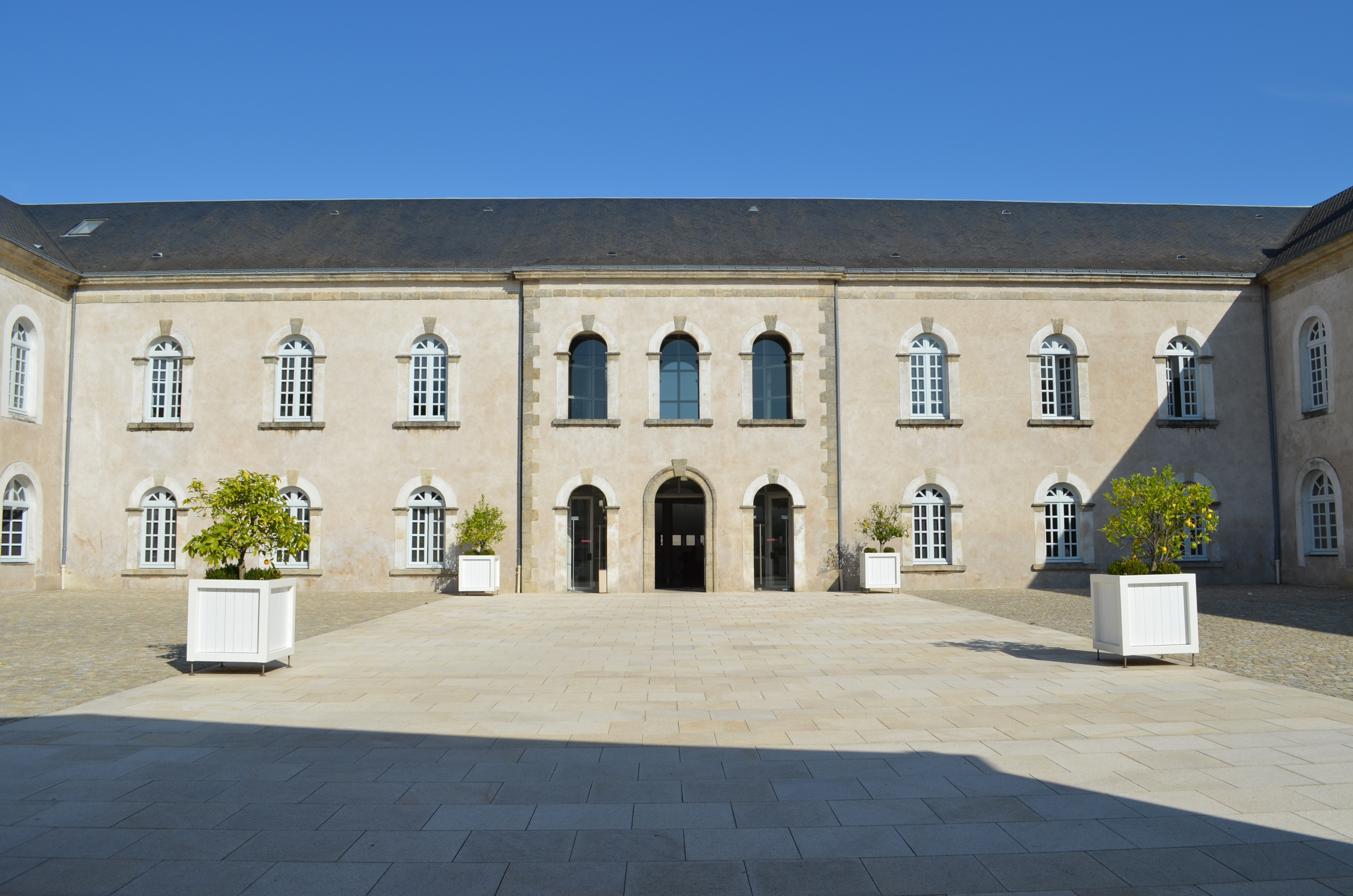
Old Hospital

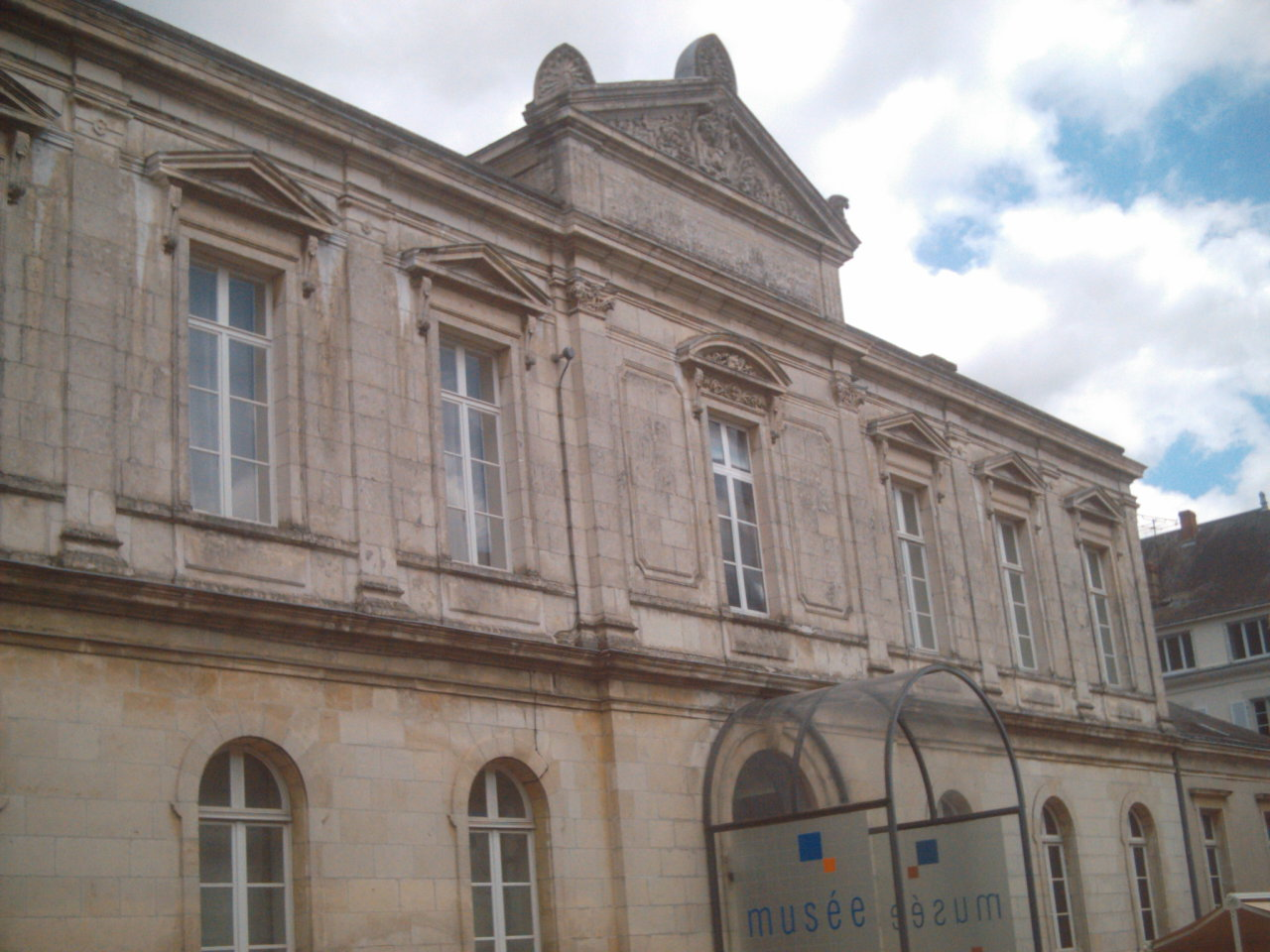
Museum

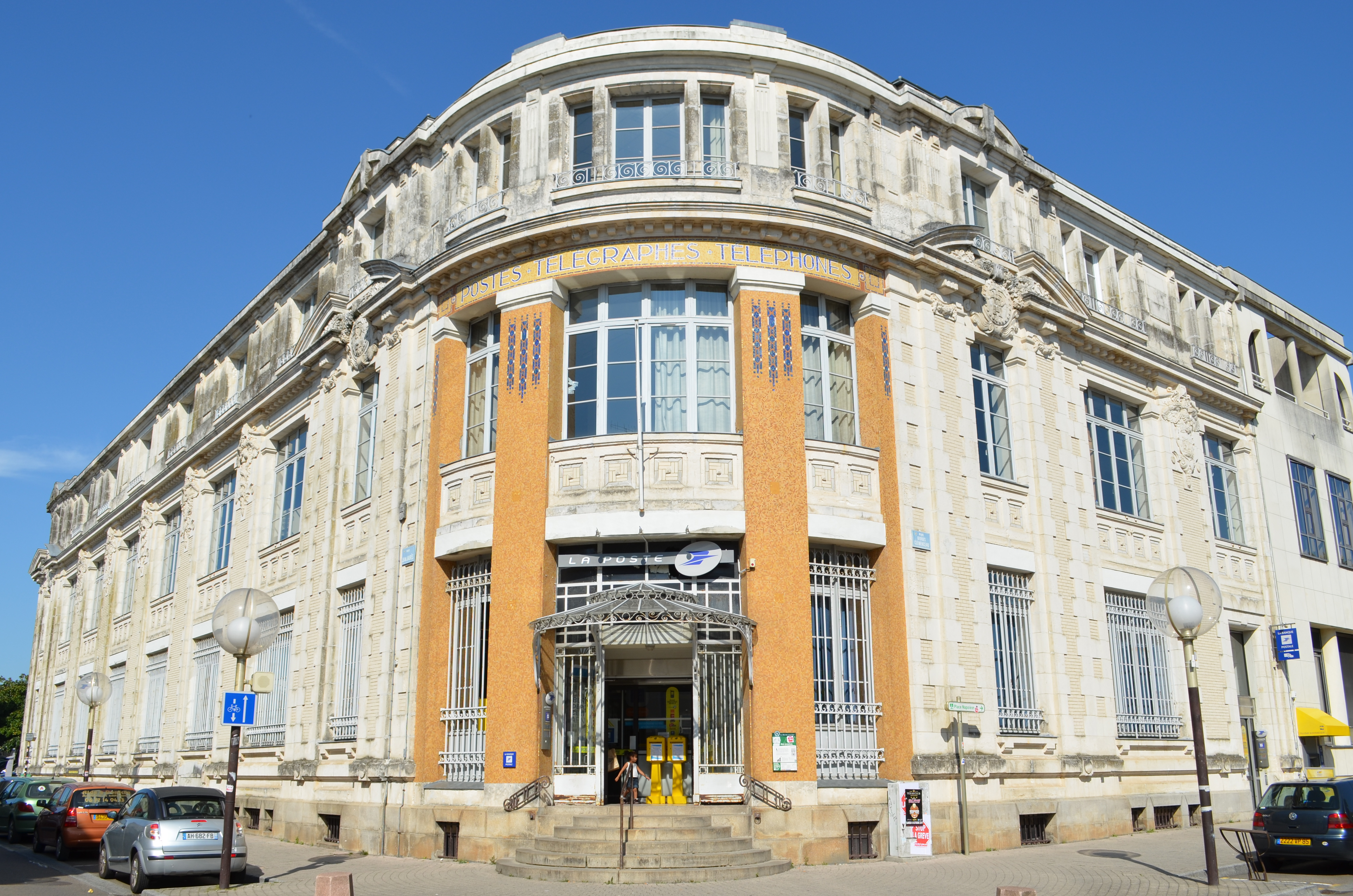
Post office

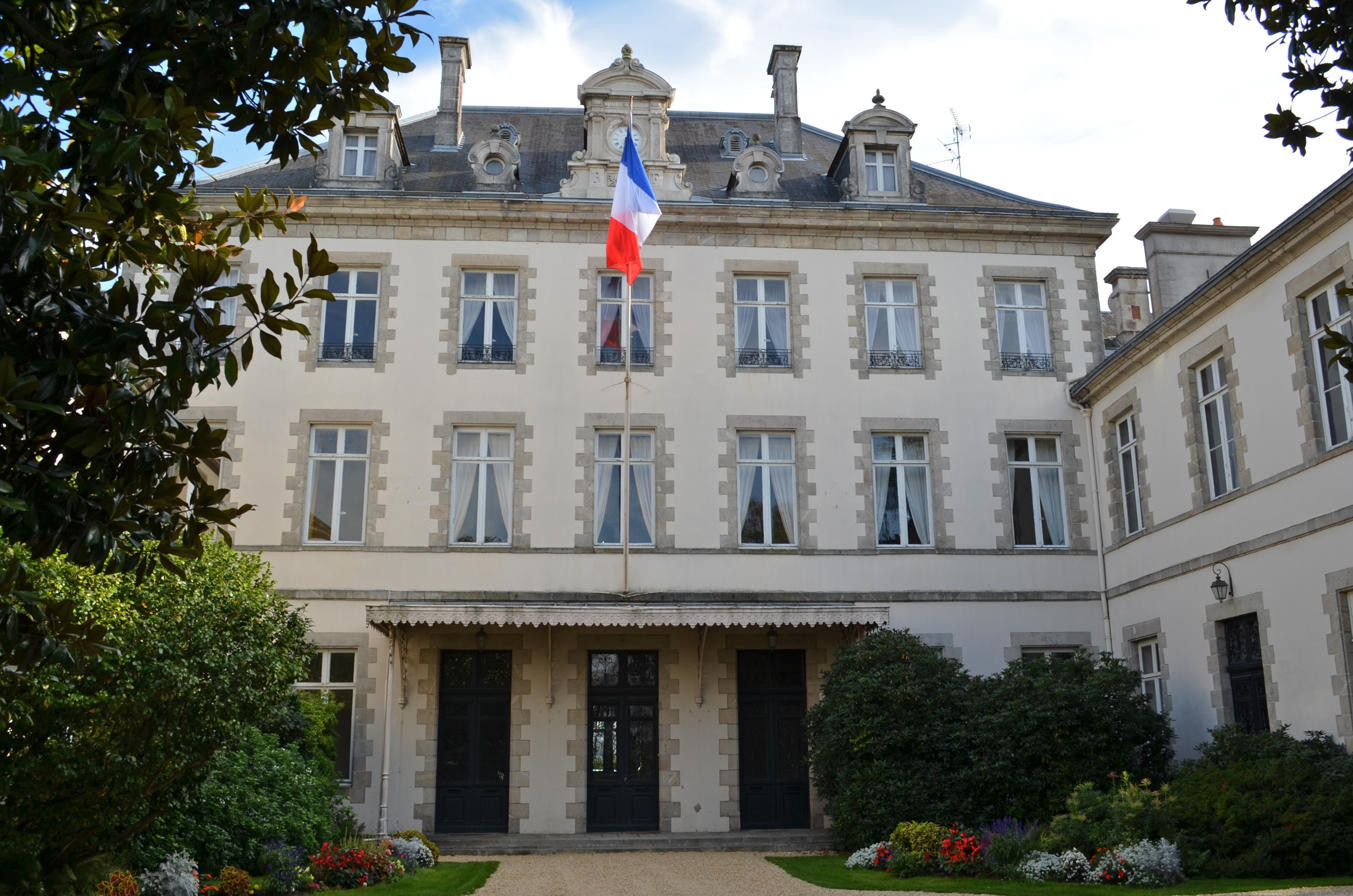
Prefecture building

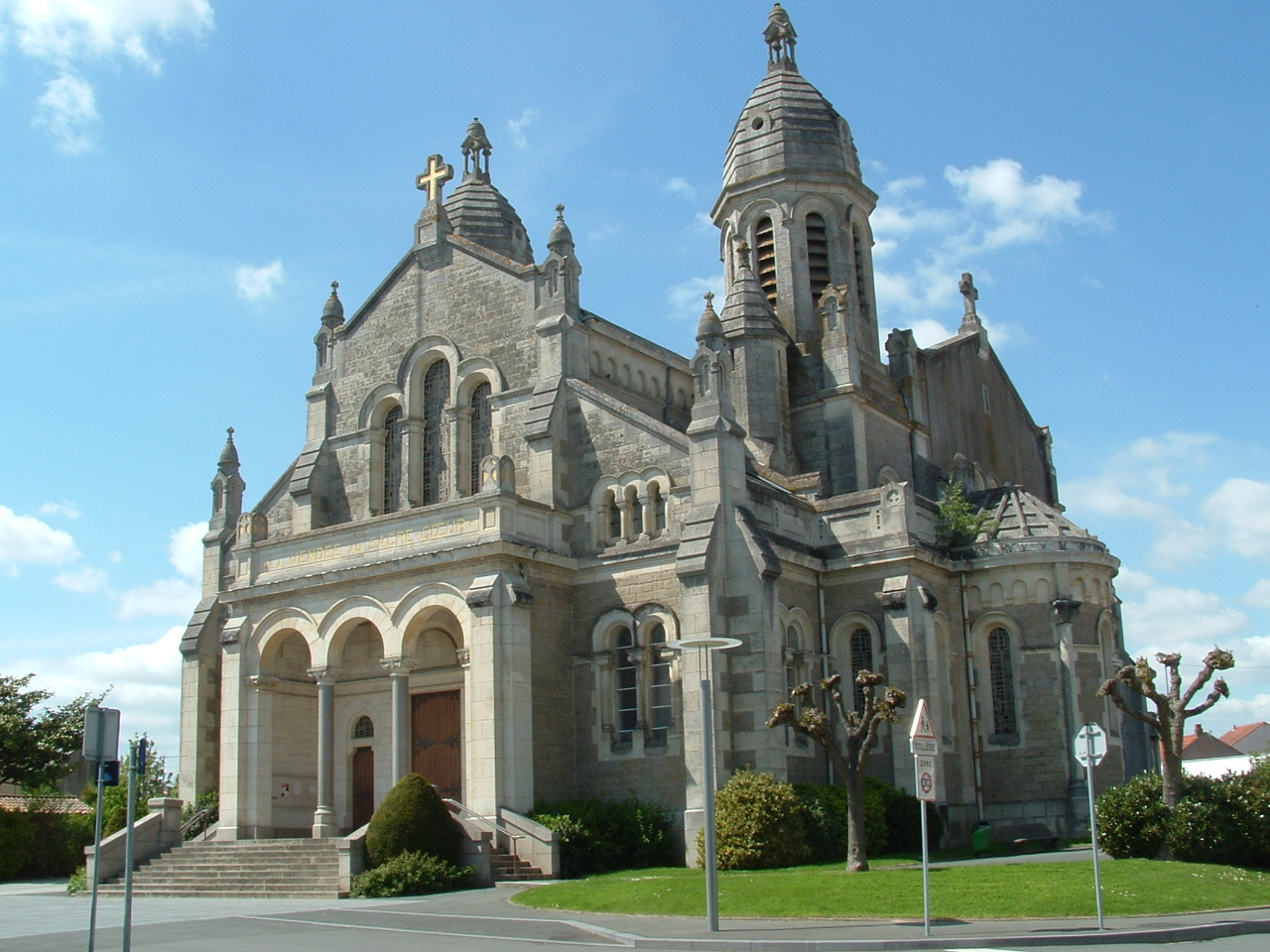
Sacré-cœur church

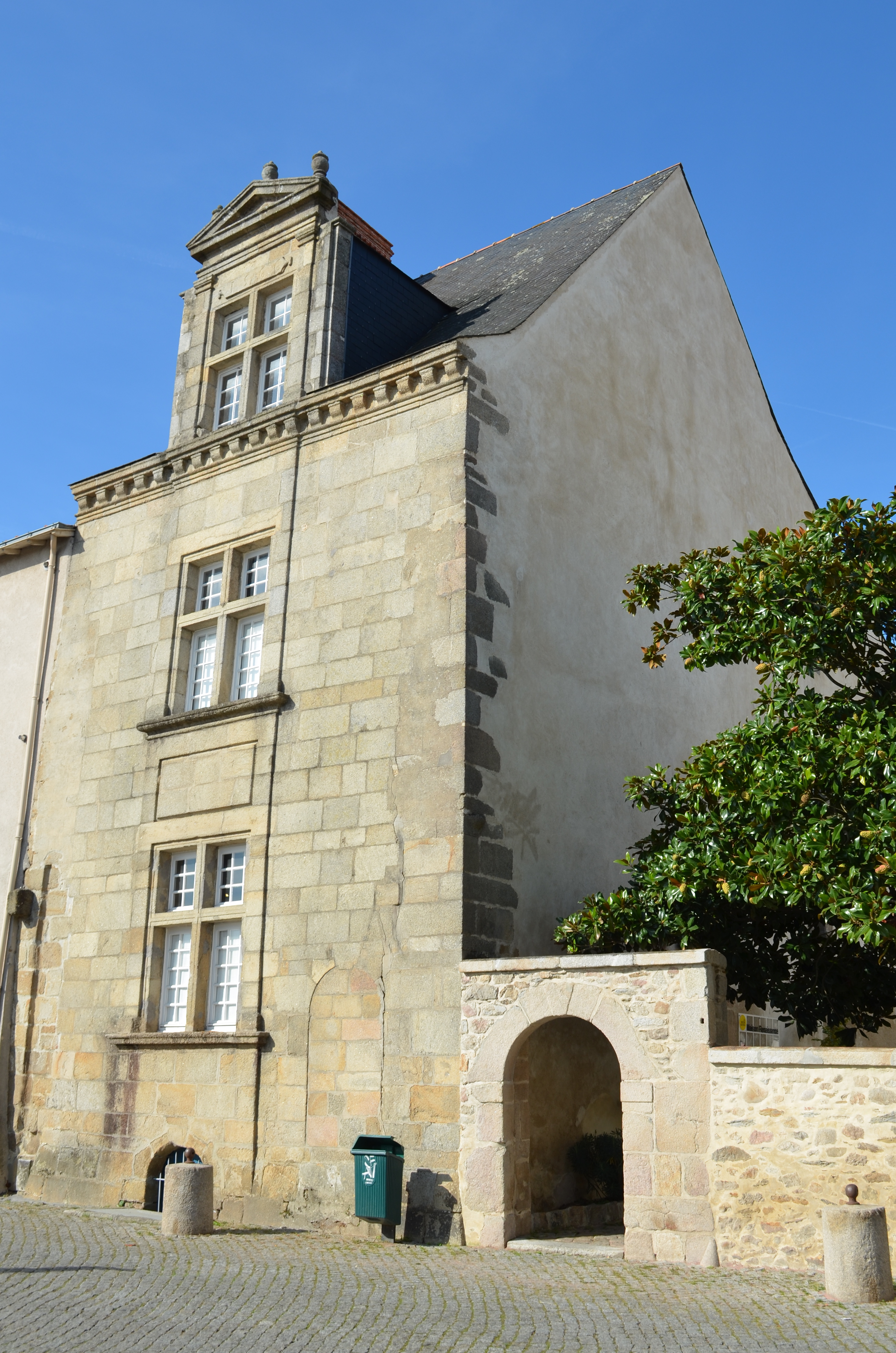
Renaissance house (1566)

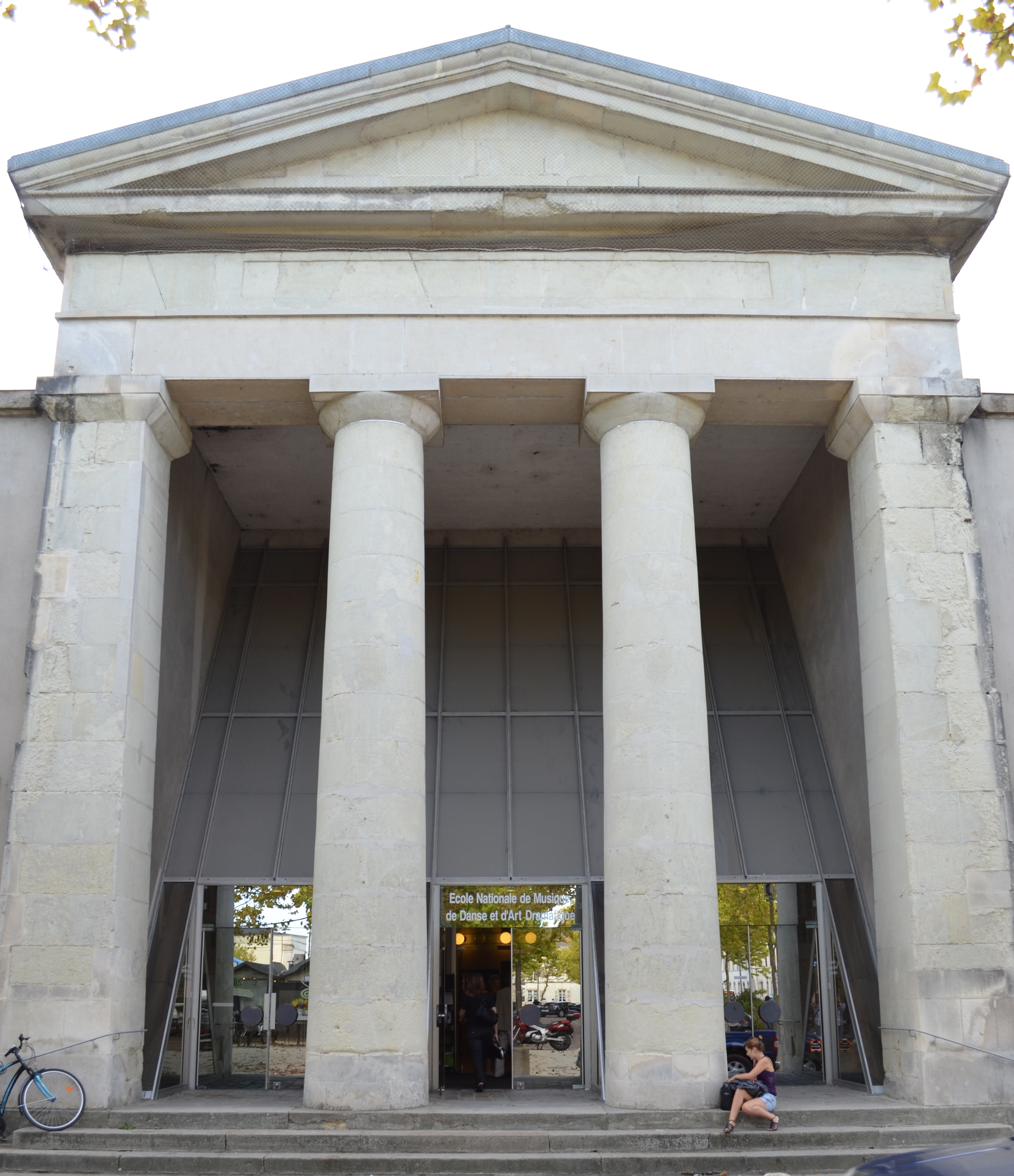
Old Palais de Justice

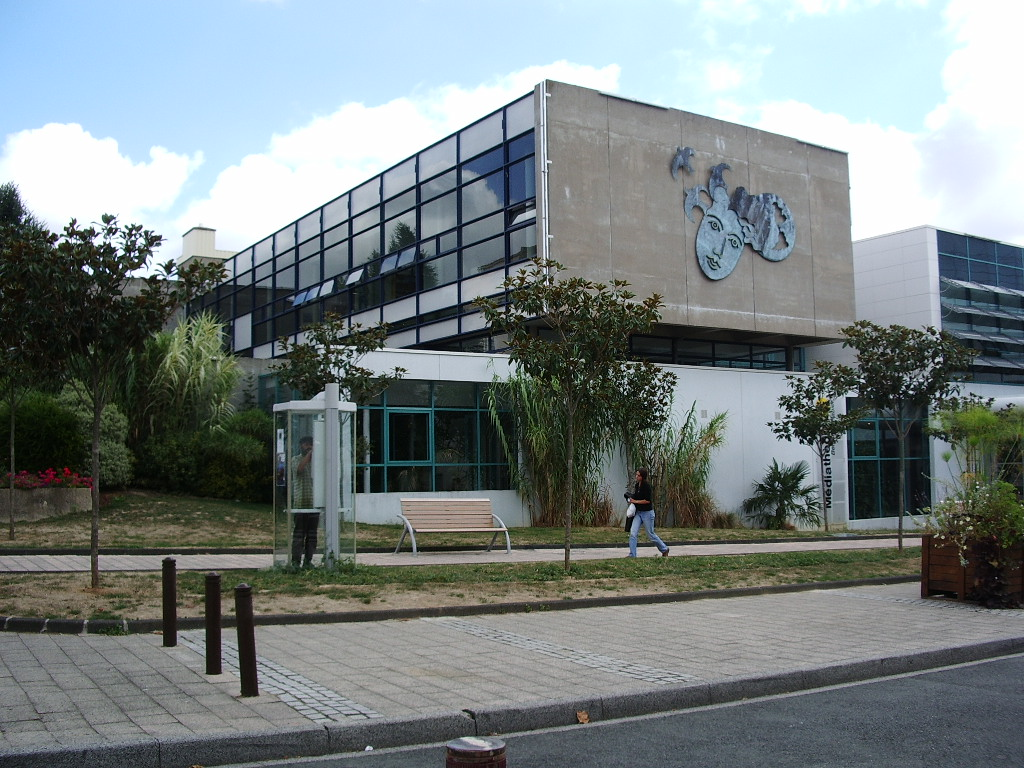
Benjamin Rabier media library

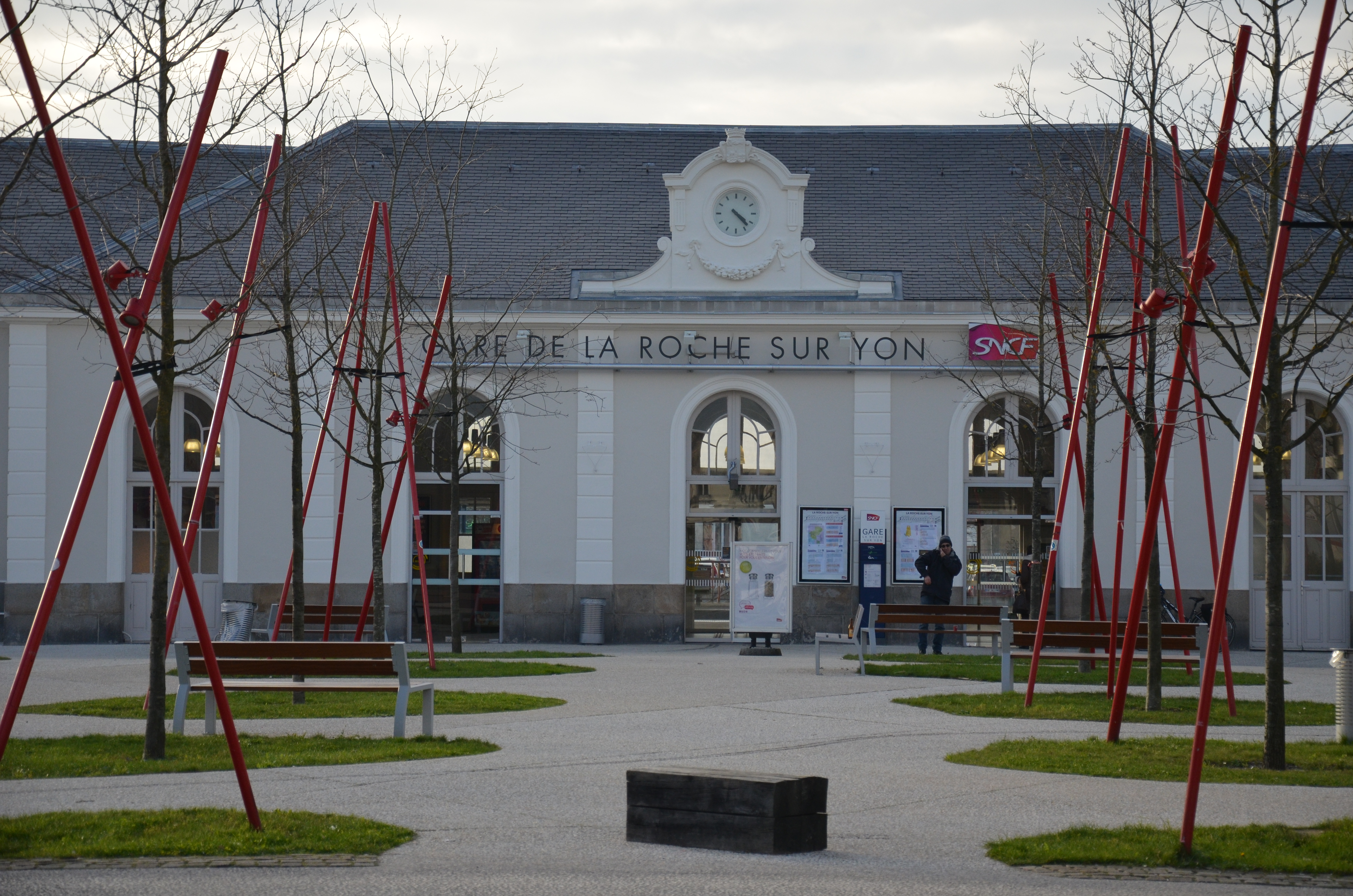
Train station

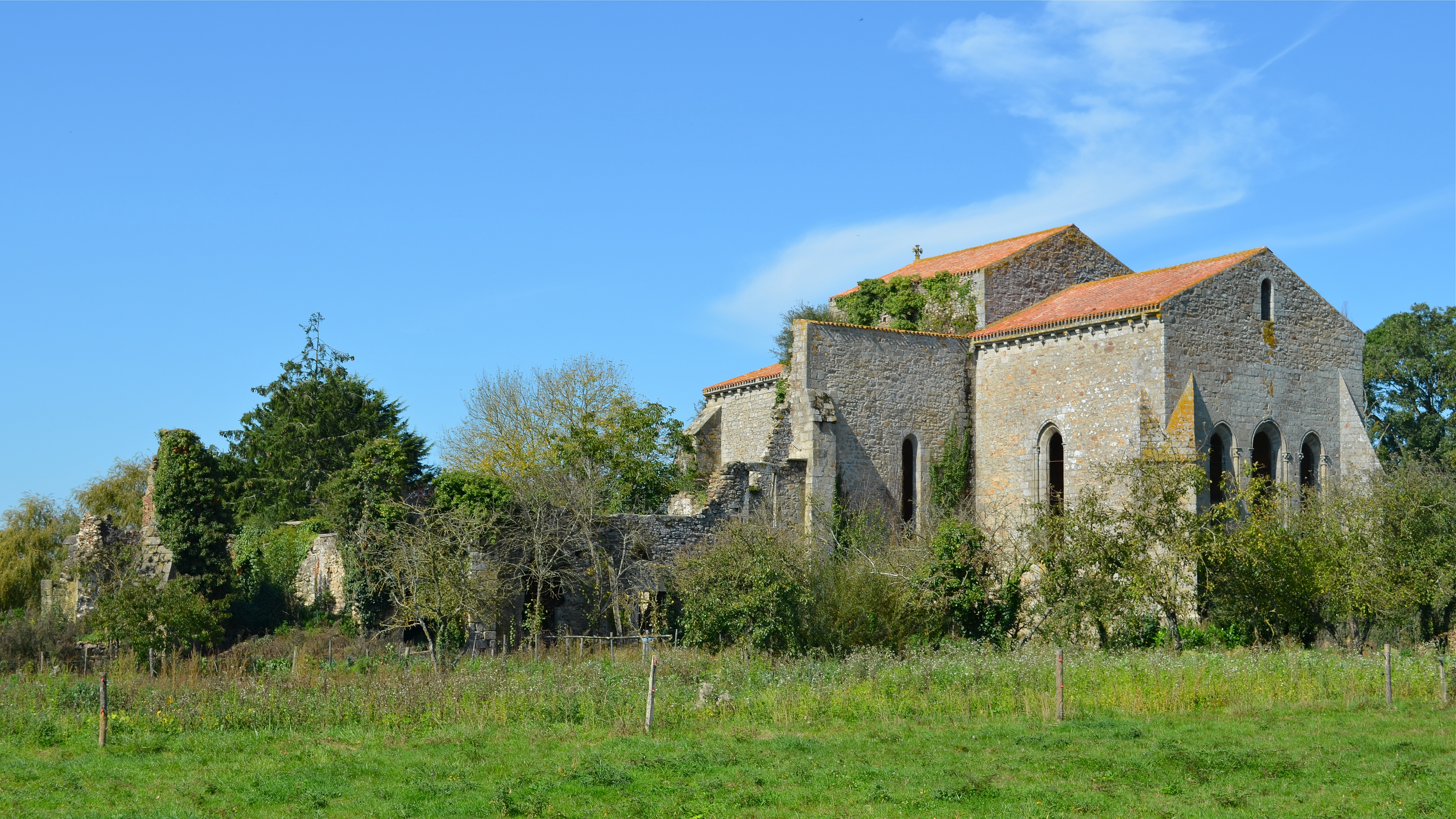
Fontenelles Abbey

== Twin towns – sister cities ==
La Roche-sur-Yon is twinned with:

- Gummersbach, Germany
- Coleraine, Northern Ireland, United Kingdom
- Drummondville, Canada
- Cáceres, Spain, since 1982
- Tizi Ouzou, Algeria, since 1989
- Burg bei Magdeburg, Germany, since 2005
- Broomhedge, Northern Ireland, United Kingdom, since 2021

== Notable people ==
- Joséphine Colomb (1833–1892), children's writer, lyricist, translator
- Jean Auriac (1906-1941), professor of medicine and member of the Resistance "Mort pour la France" (Died for France)
- Ciryl Gane (born 1990), mixed martial artist, former UFC Interim Heavyweight Champion
- Adlène Guedioura (born 1985), Algerian former professional footballer
- Thomas Laurent (born 1998), racing driver
- Nicolas Marroc (born 1986), racing driver
- MHD (born 1994), rapper

== See also ==
- Communes of the Vendée department
- Education in France
- List of schools in France
- University of Nantes
- Institut Catholique d'Études Supérieures
