= Reesen =

- Stadtteil of Burg bei Magdeburg
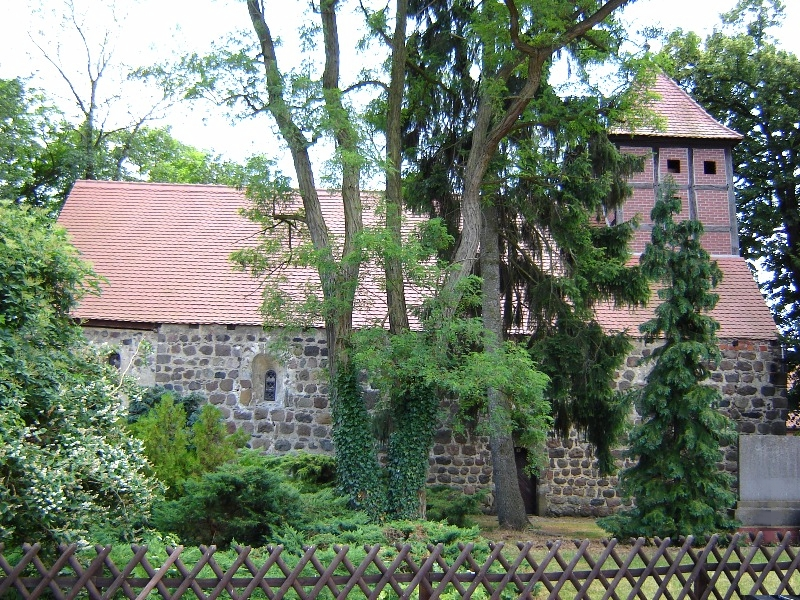
- Church

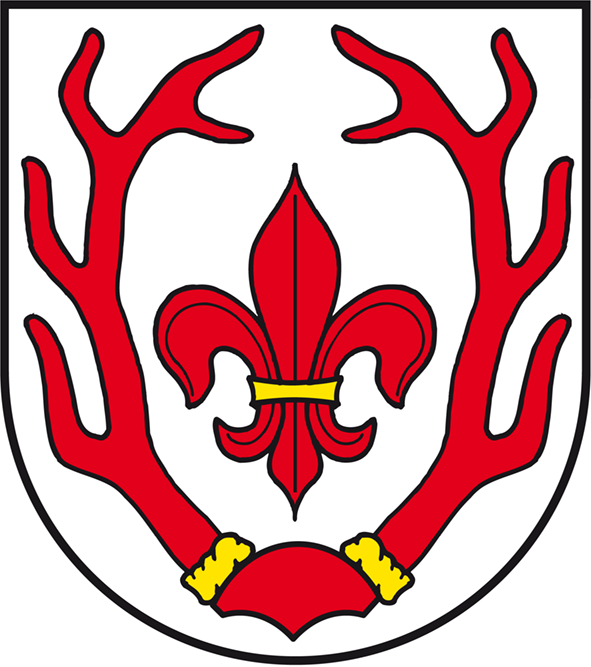
- Coat of arms
- Interactive map of Reesen
- Location within Germany Location within Saxony-Anhalt
- Coordinates: 52°17′N 11°56′E
- Country: Germany
- State: Saxony-Anhalt
- District: Jerichower Land
- Town: Burg bei Magdeburg

Area
  - Total: 13.30 km^{2} (5.14 sq mi)
- Elevation: 56 m (184 ft)

Population (2006-12-31)
  - Total: 556
  - Density: 41.8/km^{2} (108/sq mi)
- Time zone: UTC+01:00 (CET)
  - Summer (DST): UTC+02:00 (CEST)
- Postal codes: 39291
- Dialling codes: 03921

Reesen is a village and a former municipality in the Jerichower Land district, in Saxony-Anhalt, Germany. Since 1 July 2009, it is part of the town Burg bei Magdeburg.
