= Julia Bonk =

German politician

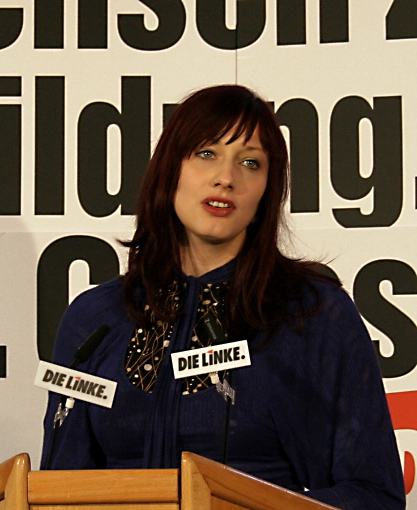
- Julia Bonk, 2009

Member of the Landtag of Saxony
- In office 19 October 2004 – 29 September 2014
- Constituency: The Left List

Personal details
- Born: 29 April 1986 (age 40) Burg bei Magdeburg, East Germany
- Party: The Left
- Occupation: Politician
- Known for: Youngest member of parliament in Germany
- Website: www.juliabonk.de

Julia Bonk (born 29 April 1986) is a German Left Party politician. She served as the member of the Landtag of Saxony from 2004 to 2014 and was a member of the executive board of the Left Party from June 2012 to 2014.

== Career ==
Bonk became a member of the Landtag of Saxony in 2004 immediately after finishing school, later joining the Left Party in 2006. She was elected at age 18 and became the youngest member of a parliament in Germany. During the fourth legislative period of the Landtag of Saxony (2004–2009), Bonk was the Vice-Spokeswoman of the parliamentary committee on School and Sport and member of the committee on Science and University.

The newspaper Badische Zeitung counted that 87 international papers printed her picture.
