= Radio forces françaises de Berlin =

French military radio station in West Berlin

Radio Forces Françaises de Berlin (Radio FFB) was a broadcaster catering to the French military contingent in the French Sector of West Berlin. It was located in the Quartier Napoléon near Tegel Airport, in the French sector.

== Radio ==
Radio broadcasts began on 8 May 1957. FFB began broadcasting on 93.6 MHz FM in 1959. Most programmes were from the French national broadcaster RTF (later ORTF). This was initially a mixture of France Inter, France Culture and France Musique, but by the 1980s, only France Inter programmes were being broadcast.

On 15 September 1963, the French-language programmes were supplemented with German-language broadcasts to listeners in the (West) Berlin area. Consisting of hour-long programmes aired between 1800 and 1900 local time, these were later produced by the German service of Radio France Internationale. There were also locally produced short bulletins for members of the French garrison in Berlin.

The departure of the Allies from Berlin in 1994 signalled the end of the FFB radio service. The 93.6 MHz frequency has been used ever since by Radio France Internationale, meaning that from July 1995, French radio broadcasts could still be received in Berlin and Brandenburg on 93.6 MHz and 106.0 MHz.

== TV ==
In 1980, a TV station, Télévision Française à Berlin, was established, for which, like the radio station, programming was acquired from the French domestic channels, TF1 and Antenne 2 (now France 2). From 1984, the international French-language channel TV5 (now TV5Monde) was carried. In addition to programming from TF1 and Antenne 2, it also carried programming from FR3 (now France 3). The service was available in West Berlin over the air on channel 31 (SECAM G, after December 1990: PAL G) and also via cable, but only in the French Sector.

== End of broadcasts ==
Following the withdrawal of French forces from the reunified Berlin, FFB radio and TFB television broadcasts ceased in June 1994.

== See also ==
- AFN Berlin
  - Rundfunk im amerikanischen Sektor
- American Forces Network
- British Forces Broadcasting Service
- Radio Wolga
