= Burg AM transmitter =

Transmitter station in Germany

Coordinates: 52°17′09″N 11°53′53″E

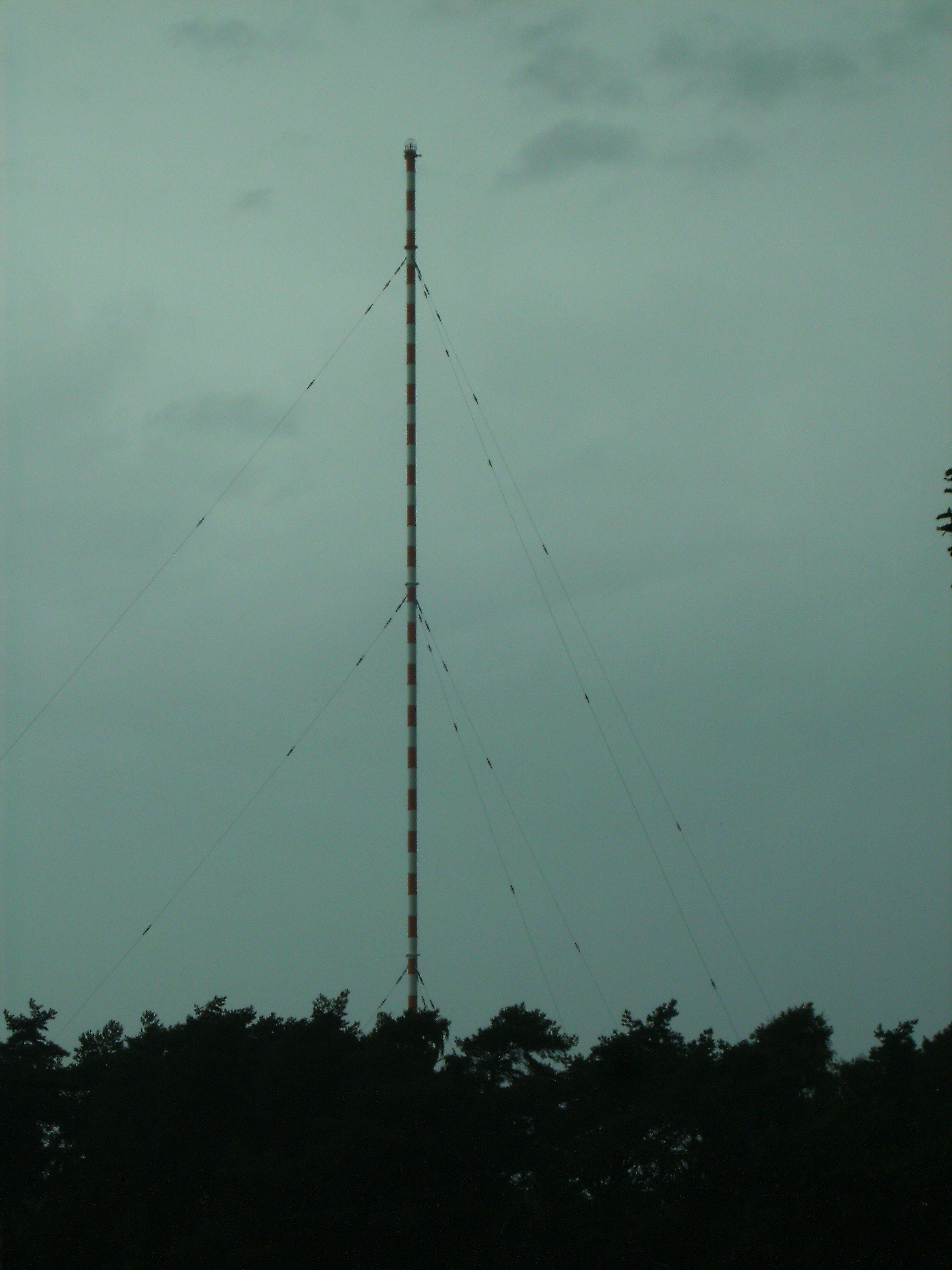
Burg transmitter 210 meter mast

The AM transmitter in Burg, near Magdeburg, Germany, is a huge facility for longwave and mediumwave broadcasting. Its most dominant constructions are a 324-metre guyed radio mast and two 210 metre guyed steel tube masts.

The 324-metre-high mast is a grounded construction with triangular cross section. Until the early 1990s it had a highly effective fading-reducing transmitting antenna in the form of a special cage aerial developed in Russia, known as the ARRT-antenna. It was used for the 1000 kW-medium wave transmitter operated on 783 kHz, which was the strongest transmitter of the former GDR, as transmitting antenna. Today this mast has a cage aerial for long wave. Both the 210-metre-high tube masts are isolated from the ground. One of the two tube masts can be used as a toe-fed mast antenna for long and medium wave, while the other mast can be used only as a transmitting antenna for the medium-wave band.

As further antenna systems there are still three step-radiating antennas, each of which is supported by two freestanding steel framework towers and which served as transmitting antenna for a medium-wave transmitter on the frequency 1575 kHz (shut down at present) and a triangle plane aerial for medium wave.

From 1967 to 1976 there was also another 350-metre-high (1,150 ft) radio mast for long wave, the steel tube lattice mast SL3, which was used for transmitting the program of Radio Wolga. In order not to affect the radiation field of the other masts, this radio mast was placed at a distance of 2.2 kilometres from the other masts near the road from Burg to Grabow, in the neighbourhood of Gütter, part of Burg. It collapsed on February 18, 1976, because of a defective bolt and was not rebuilt. As a replacement, one of the two 210-metre-high (690 ft) steel tube masts was converted in such a way that it could also broadcast the program of Radio Wolga (and later also of Radioropa Info) in the long-wave range. There are still some remains of the basements of the radio mast SL3 today.

In the 1960s some propaganda transmitters, as German military transmitters, were operated on the site of the AM transmitter Burg.

== See also ==
- List of masts
