= Radio Wolga =

Soviet radio station in East Germany

Radio Wolga (Russian: Радио Волга, romanized: Radio Volga) was a radio station for the Soviet armed forces stationed in the former East Germany and Czechoslovakia, broadcasting mainly in Russian.

== Broadcasting station ==
Based in Potsdam, Radio Wolga broadcast from the Königs Wusterhausen radio facility near Berlin, as well as the Burg AM transmitter near Magdeburg.

From 1967 to 1976 Radio Wolga used the 350-meter SL-3 tower, 2.2 kilometers from the transmitter. After it collapsed in 1976, one of the site's two 210-meter high steel tube masts was used instead. Radio Wolga originally broadcast on the longwave frequency 283 kHz.

== Programming ==
Beside programs for the Soviet soldiers stationed in the GDR, Radio Wolga also broadcast German language programmes from Radio Moscow. After German reunification in 1990, transmitting time was rented to the German-language news station Radioropa Info, broadcasting on 261 kHz.

== Television ==
Soviet Central Television's main channel, TSS-1, was also relayed in East Germany via satellite.

== Shutdown ==
With the departure of Russian troops from Germany, Radio Wolga ceased broadcasting in June 1994. Radioropa Info took over its frequency, broadcasting from late 1994 to 2000, first from Daun and then from Leipzig. In 1999 a new cage aerial was mounted on the 324-meter radio mast in Burg.

== See also ==
- AFN Berlin
- American Forces Network
- British Forces Broadcasting Service
- Radio forces françaises de Berlin
