= List of FM radio stations in Germany =

The following is a list of all FM radio stations that are located in Germany ordered by their frequency.

== List ==
Frequency in MHz	Program	Station location	Effective transmission power in kW
87.6	hr3	Sackpfeife (Biedenkopf)	100
87.6	NDR 2 (Hamburg)	Hamburg-Moorfleet	80
87.6	BR Klassik	Dillberg	25
87.6		Rockenhausen	0,5
87.6	Antenne Idar-Oberstein	Idar-Oberstein Hillschied	0,2
87.6	RadioEIT	Kaiserslautern/TU	0,25
87.6	Antenne Brandenburg (Frankfurt)	Frankfurt (Oder)/Booßen	10
87.6	SWR4 Baden-Württemberg (Baden Radio)	Pforzheim/Wartberg	0,5
87.6	WDR Eins Live	Köln/Kölnturm	0,3
87.6	MDR Aktuell	Jessen	1
87.6	NDR Info (Niedersachsen)	Osnabrück/Schleptruper Egge	0,2
87.6	SWR4 Baden-Württemberg (Bodensee Radio)	Zwiefalten (Donautal)	0,1
87.6	SWR1 Baden-Württemberg	Hohe Möhr	0,1
87.6	Energy Sachsen (Dresden)	Hoyerswerda	0,32
87.6	SWR4 Baden-Württemberg (Radio Stuttgart)	Mötzingen/Herrenberg	1
87.6	BR Klassik	Lindau/Hoyerberg	0,1
87.6	NDR 1 Radio MV (Vorpommern)	Barth	0,4
87.6	Radio Hannover	Hannover/Telemax	0,1
87.6	Energy Berlin	Prenzlau	0,2
87.6	SWR1 Baden-Württemberg	Heidenheim a.d Brenz/Schloß Hellenstein	0,01
87.6	Deutschlandfunk (DLF)	Füssen-Wasenmoos	0,1
87.6	BR Klassik	Balderschwang/Kreuzle-Alm	0,02
87.6	BR24	Herzogstand/Fahrenbergkopf (BR)	0,08
87.6	89.2 Radio Potsdam	Brandenburg	0,4
87.6	R.SA (Dresden)	Löbau	0,5
87.7	SWR1 Rheinland-Pfalz	Mainz-Kastel	1
87.7	MDR Kultur	Chemnitz/Geyer	100
87.7	SWR4 Baden-Württemberg (Radio Südbaden)	Wannenberg	2,6
87.7	NDR Info (Schleswig-Holstein)	Flensburg-Engelsby	10
87.7	SWR2 (Baden-Württemberg)	Eberbach/Bocksberg	0,05
87.7	Radio 21 (Süd)	Goslar-Sudmerberg	0,5
87.7	AFN Bavaria-The Eagle	Schweinfurt/Ledward Barracks	0,1
87.7	Welle Niederrhein (Krefeld)	Krefeld-Bockum	0,2
87.7	WDR 5	Monschau/St, Michael Gymnasium	0,05
87.7	Bayern 1 (Niederbayern/Oberpfalz)	Passau/Kühberg	0,5
87.7	Radio Ostfriesland	Emden	0,2
87.7	WDR 5	Bad Oeynhausen/Wittekindsberg	0,1
87.7	Bayern 1 (Schwaben)	Weiler (Allgäu)/Simmerberg	0,1
87.7	RSA Radio (Oberallgäu)	Sonthofen	0,1
87.7	Bayern 2 (Südbayern)	Tegernseer Tal/Wallberg	0,1
87.7	RPR1./Radio Nürburgring	Nürburgring	0,05
87.7	Radio Trausnitz	Vilsbiburg	0,05
87.7	MDR Sachsen (Bautzen)	Zittau	0,2
87.7	bascheFM	Barsinghausen/Rehrbrinkstr. 14	0,04
87.7	Inforadio (RBB)	Wittstock	1,3
87.7	Deutschlandfunk Kultur	Geislingen/Tegelberg	0,2
87.8	SWR1 Baden-Württemberg	Bad Mergentheim-Löffelstelzen	10
87.8	WDR 2 (Dortmund)	Schwerte/Sommerberg	2
87.8	bigFM (Baden-Württemberg)	Mannheim/Luisenpark	1
87.8	DASDING (SWR)	Eyachtal (Albstadt-Ebingen)	0,5
87.8	Radio Teddy	Koblenz-Rauental	0,05
87.8	WDR 4	Holzminden Höxter	0,5
87.8	(Lokalradio Heinsberg)	Geilenkirchen	0,5
87.8	Radio Jade	Wilhelmshaven	1
87.8	MDR Aktuell	Stendal-Borstel	1
87.8	Eifelradio	Bitburg/Fernmeldeturm	0,05
87.8	Schlagerradio B2 (Mecklenburg-Vorpommern)	Greifswald	1
87.8	SWR2 (Baden-Württemberg)	Giengen an der Brenz	0,02
87.8		Nordhorn	0,25
87.8	Deutschlandfunk (DLF)	Bad Tölz-Gaißach	0,1
87.8	NDR 1 Niedersachsen (Braunschweig)	Alfeld (Leine)	0,05
87.8		Sachrang	0,01
87.8	Film-Begleitton	Autokino Prora	
87.9	MDR Kultur	Inselsberg	60
87.9	domradio Studio Nahe	Bretzenheim	0,15
87.9	SWR4 Rheinland-Pfalz (Radio Koblenz)	Diez/Geisenberg (Lahntal)	0,1
87.9	Deutschlandfunk Kultur	Stuttgarter Fernsehturm	1
87.9	hr2	Frankfurt (Main) hr-Funkhaus	0,1
87.9	Radio Neckarburg	Donaueschingen/Blumberg	1
87.9	Radio AWN	Straubing Raststätte Bayerischer Wald	1
87.9	NDR Info (Schleswig-Holstein)	Heide/Welmbüttel	15
87.9	STAR FM 87,9	Berliner Fernsehturm	1
87.9	SWR4 Baden-Württemberg (Radio Südbaden)	Baiersbronn (Oberes Murgtal)	0,1
87.9	ROCK ANTENNE	Augsburg/Hotelturm	0,32
87.9	Radio HERTZ	Bielefeld/DTAG	0,05
87.9	106.4 TOP FM (Erding)	Erding/Indorfer Berg	0,1
87.9	Bayern 2 (Südbayern)	Reit im Winkl	0,1
87.9	Deutschlandfunk	Starnberg/Gautinger Str.	0,05
87.9	MDR Aktuell	Bautzen	0,1
87.9	bit eXpress	Erlangen-Tennenlohe (Fraunhofer)	0,01
87.9	Peilsender	Klingenmünster/Pfalzklinikum	0,005
87.9	SWR3 (Alb/Bodensee)	Ravensburg/Weingarten (Schussental)	0,1
88.0	SR 1 Europawelle	Göttelborner Höhe	100
88.0	WDR 5	Bonn-Venusberg	50
88.0	BR Klassik	Gelbelsee	10
88.0	Radio Frankfurt 95,1	Wiesbaden-Delkenheim/Oberfeldhof	0,32
88.0	Radio Euroherz	Hof/Großer Waldstein	5
88.0	extra-radio	Hof/Großer Waldstein	5
88.0	Rock Antenne	Gießen/DTAG	0,5
88.0	Rockland Sachsen-Anhalt	Weißenfels	1
88.0	Radio ZuSa	Uelzen/Funkturm	1
88.0	NB-Radiotreff 88,0	Neubrandenburg	0,8
88.0	NDR Kultur	Lübeck/Wallanlagen	0,5
88.0	104.6 RTL	Finsterwalde Crinitz	1
88.0	Deutschlandfunk	Seesen/Kleiner Schildberg	0,05
88.0		Ochsenhausen	0,01
88.1	Deutschlandfunk	Lorch Oberheimbach	0,2
88.1	hr1	Würzberg	5
88.1	Hit Radio FFH (Mittelhessen)	Alsfeld	4
88.1	MDR Sachsen-Anhalt (Dessau)	Wittenberg/Gallunberg	30
88.1	Radio Hochstift	Eggegebirge/Lichtenauer Kreuz	4
88.1	Bayern 1 (Schwaben)	Lindau/Hoyerberg	0,5
88.1	Radio Galaxy Kempten	Kempten/Allgäu Tower	0,3
88.1	SWR2 (Baden-Württemberg)	Pforzheim-Arlinger	3,2
88.1	hitradio.rt1 südschwaben	Krumbach	0,1
88.1	Syltfunk - Söl'ring Radio	Westerland (Sylt)	0,2
88.1	Bayern 1 (Oberbayern)	Herzogstand/Fahrenbergkopf (BR)	0,08
88.1	Radio Erzgebirge	Olbernhau	0,1
88.1	HAMBURG ZWEI	Hamburg-Bergedorf	0,1
88.2	Bayern 2 (Nordbayern)	Büttelberg	25
88.2	Radio BOB! (Hessen)	Wetzlar-Aßlar Klein Altenstädten	0,5
88.2	Radio Siegen	Siegen-Giersberg	0,5
88.2	NDR Kultur	Rostock-Toitenwinkel	160
88.2	YOU FM (hr)	Schlüchtern/Alte Hohenzeller Str.	0,32
88.2	MDR Thüringen (Gera)	Jena-Oßmaritz	1
88.2		Naurath (Wald)	0,05
88.2	Lausitzwelle	Kamenz Weißig	1
88.2	harmony.fm	Wiesbaden/Konrad Adenauer Ring	0,5
88.2	Bayernwelle Südost (Berchtesgadener Land)	Bad Reichenhall/Kirchholz-Froschham	0,3
88.2	NDR 1 Niedersachsen (Braunschweig)	Hann. Münden/Tannenkamp	0,05
88.2	NDR 1 Niedersachsen (Braunschweig)	Goslar-Sudmerberg	0,1
88.2	RSA Radio (Ostallgäu)	Kaufbeuren	0,2
88.2	Radio Kiepenkerl	Lüdinghausen	0,5
88.2	Vogtland Radio	Auerbach (Vogtland)	0,4
88.2	NDR Info (Niedersachsen)	Wolfsburg-Klieversberg	0,1
88.2	hr-info	Seeheim-Jugenheim	0,05
88.2	Radio Nordseewelle	Norden	0,25
88.2		Hindelang	0,01
88.3	SWR1 Baden-Württemberg	Raichberg	40
88.3	bremen zwei	Bremen-Walle	100
88.3	Antenne Bad Kreuznach	Bad Kreuznach/Schanzenkopf	0,1
88.3	Rockland Radio (Koblenz)	Koblenz/Bendorf (Vierwindenhöhe)	2
88.3	Bayern 2 (Nordbayern)	Coburg/Eckardtsberg	5
88.3	BR Klassik	Hoher Bogen	5
88.3	Radyo Metropol FM (Südwest)	Ludwigshafen	0,1
88.3	Radio MK	Meinerzhagen/Schwarzenberg	0,1
88.3	NDR 1 Radio MV (Schwerin)	Dömitz	1
88.3	WDR 5	Hallenberg	0,1
88.3	Radyo Metropol FM (Nordrhein-Westfalen)	Essen-Holsterhausen	0,1
88.3	harmony.fm	Eschwege	0,25
88.3	MDR Thüringen (Heiligenstadt)	Nordhausen	0,1
88.3	R.SA (Dresden)	Freital	0,2
88.3	SWR1 Rheinland-Pfalz	Bleialf	0,01
88.3		Clausthal-Zellerfeld	0,05
88.3	Deutschlandfunk Kultur	Traunstein	0,1
88.3	Power Radio	Neuruppin	0,5
88.4	Bayern 2 (Nordbayern)	Pfaffenberg	25
88.4	MDR Kultur	Leipzig Wiederau	100
88.4	SWR1 Rheinland-Pfalz	Diez/Geisenberg (Lahntal)	0,1
88.4	Bayern 2 (Südbayern)	Ismaning	25
88.4	Cityradio Trier	Trier/Petrisberg	0,3
88.4	Radio WMW	Bocholt/Hohenstaufenstr.	1
88.4	harmony.fm	Bad Hersfeld	0,32
88.4	Radio BOB! (Hessen)	Fritzlar	0,1
88.4	Antenne Pirmasens	Pirmasens/Biebermühler Str.	0,32
88.4	uniFM	Freiburg/Uni-Klinik	0,3
88.4	PH 88,4	Freiburg/Uni-Klinik	0,3
88.4	88vier	Berlin-Schöneberg	2
88.4		Bruchsal/Industriestr.	1
88.4		Hermeskeil	0,4
88.4	WDR 2 (Köln)	Bergheim/Glessener Höhe	0,5
88.4	WDR 5	Warburg/Stapelberg	0,5
88.4		Kiel-Holtenau	0,02
88.4	echo-fm 88,4	Freiburg/Universität	
88.5	NDR 1 Niedersachsen (Braunschweig)	Göttingen-Nikolausberg	5
88.5	NDR 1 Radio MV (Neubrandenburg)	Röbel	10
88.5	SWR4 Baden-Württemberg (Baden Radio)	Baden-Baden/Merkur	0,8
88.5	hr3	Fulda-Maberzell	0,32
88.5	SWR1 Rheinland-Pfalz	Altenahr (Oberes Ahrtal)	0,1
88.5	SWR2 (Baden-Württemberg)	Geislingen/Oberböhringen	0,5
88.5	Radio Bamberg	Bamberg/Rothof	0,5
88.5	SWR1 Rheinland-Pfalz	Idar-Oberstein (Nahetal)	0,01
88.5	WDR 5	Arnsberg/Schloßberg	0,1
88.5	Radio Charivari Würzburg	Kitzingen/Schwanberg	0,05
88.5	SR 2 Kulturradio	Mettlach	0,01
88.5	Radio Ramasuri	Tirschenreuth	0,1
88.5	WDR 5	Ibbenbüren-Osterledde	0,5
88.5	Radio 8	Weißenburg	0,05
88.5	Radio BOB! (Schleswig-Holstein) (Nord/West)	Flensburg/Wassersleben	0,2
88.5	Radio Hamburg	Cuxhaven Otterndorf	2,7
88.5	Antenne Lübeck	Lübeck Berkenthin	0,1
88.5		Bad Oeynhausen/Werre-Park	0,005
88.6	SWR4 Rheinland-Pfalz (Radio Mainz)	Oestrich-Winkel Hallgarten	0,5
88.6	SR 2 Kulturradio	Moseltal (Perl)	5
88.6	NDR Info (Mecklenburg-Vorpommern)	Garz (Rügen)	10
88.6	Landeswelle Thüringen (Süd)	Suhl/Erleshügel	1
88.6	Deutschlandfunk (DLF)	Cottbus Klein Oßnig	3
88.6	Deutschlandfunk Kultur	Völklingen	0,1
88.6	NDR Info (Niedersachsen)	Holzminden Stahle	0,5
88.6	Radio Ton Heilbronn, Franken (Schwäbisch Hall)	Langenburg	1
88.6	Radio Charivari Würzburg	Karlstadt	0,05
88.6	Deutschlandfunk Kultur	Bad Camberg	0,5
88.6	WDR 5	Lübbecke/Bohlenstr.	0,1
88.6	NDR Info (Niedersachsen)	Hannover Hemmingen	0,5
88.6	HoRadS	Stuttgart-Münster	1
88.6		Rivenich	0,04
88.6	radio TOP 40	Erfurt-Hochheim	0,5
88.6	Deutschlandfunk Kultur	Ingolstadt-Stammham	0,63
88.6	NDR 1 Niedersachsen (Hannover)	Bad Pyrmont/Hamberg	0,05
88.6	Film-Begleitton	Autokino Gravenbruch, Leinwand 2	
88.7	WDR 3	Sackpfeife (Wittgenstein)	15
88.7	Bayern 2 (Südbayern)	Grünten	100
88.7	Deutschlandfunk (DLF)	Traben-Trarbach	0,32
88.7	MDR Sachsen (Chemnitz)	Auerbach/Schöneck	3
88.7	Deutschlandfunk (DLF)	Hamburg-Moorfleet	3
88.7	Weill FM	Dessau	(1)
88.7	Deutschlandfunk Kultur	Straubing/Kolbstraße	0,4
88.7	Landeswelle Thüringen (Nord)	Heiligenstadt	0,1
88.7	NDR Info (Niedersachsen)	Königslutter/Heineberg	0,2
88.7	Radio Bamberg	Burgwindheim	0,05
88.7	Antenne MV (West)	Wismar/Werft	0,2
88.7	beach f.m.	Zeithain	0,005
88.7	Radio Teddy	Weimar-Ehringsdorf	0,063
88.8	SWR2 (Baden-Württemberg)	Fernsehturm Heidelberg	100
88.8	WDR 5	Langenberg	100
88.8	rbb 88.8	Berlin/Scholzplatz	80
88.8	MDR Aktuell	Weißenfels	1
88.8	Deutschlandfunk Kultur	Visselhövede	1
88.8	MDR Aktuell	Gotha	0,1
88.8	radio TOP 40	Sonneberg/Schönberg	0,1
88.8	Radio BOB! (Hessen)	Hofgeismar	0,2
88.8	ROCK ANTENNE (Erding)	Isen	0,5
88.8		Saalfeld	0,02
88.8	N-JOY	Garding	0,15
88.9	Bayern 1 (Franken)	Dillberg	25
88.9	hr-info	Bad Nauheim-Nieder Mörlen	0,32
88.9	hr3	Schlüchtern/Alte Hohenzeller Str.	0,32
88.9	N-JOY	Rostock-Toitenwinkel	5
88.9	hr1	Bad Hersfeld	0,32
88.9	SWR4 Baden-Württemberg (Radio Südbaden)	Strasbourg/Port du Rhin (Frankreich)	1
88.9	apollo radio	Chemnitz-Reichenhain	1
88.9	Deutschlandfunk Kultur	Lemgo/Wiembecker Berg	0,32
88.9	NDR Info (Niedersachsen)	Lingen-Damaschke	0,32
88.9	MDR Sachsen (Leipzig)	Torgau	0,5
88.9	Radio BOB! (Schleswig-Holstein) (Mitte)	Neumünster	0,5
88.9	Deutschlandfunk Kultur	Boppard	0,1
88.9		Bad Tölz-Gaißach	0,05
88.9	NDR 1 Welle Nord (Heide)	Helgoland	0,05
89.0	89.0 RTL	Brocken	60
89.0	SWR4 Rheinland-Pfalz (Radio Mainz)	Bad Kreuznach/Kauzenburg	0,1
89.0	BR Klassik	Würzburg/Frankenwarte, BR	5
89.0	SWR4 Baden-Württemberg (Bodensee Radio)	Witthoh (Tuttlingen)	5
89.0	Radyo Metropol FM (Nordrhein-Westfalen)	Olpe	0,5
89.0	Deutschlandfunk Kultur	Jever	0,5
89.0	Radio 2Day	München/Olympiaturm	0,32
89.0	Radio Fips	Göppingen/Landratsamt	0,1
89.0	SWR4 Baden-Württemberg (Radio Tübingen)	Nagoldtal	0,1
89.0	MDR JUMP	Hoyerswerda	0,5
89.0	SWR4 Baden-Württemberg (Radio Tübingen)	Unterhausen	0,1
89.0	NDR 1 Radio MV (Vorpommern)	Wolgast	0,4
89.0	Radio Trausnitz	Dingolfing	0,1
89.0	Bayernwelle Südost (Berchtesgadener Land)	Högl	0,3
89.0	Bayern 1 (Oberbayern)	Mittenwald	0,01
89.0	Film-Begleitton	Autokino Kornwestheim, Leinwand 1	
89.0	Film-Begleitton	Autokino Aschheim, Leinwand 1	
89.0	Film-Begleitton	Autokino Berlin, Leinwand 1	
89.1	Deutschlandfunk (DLF)	Bonn-Bad Godesberg/Heiderhof	5
89.1	SR 3 Saarlandwelle	Bliestal	5
89.1	Antenne 1 (Heilbronn)	Heilbronn/Schweinsberg	0,5
89.1	Radio Eins (RBB) (Frankfurt)	Frankfurt (Oder)/Booßen	5
89.1	SWR1 Baden-Württemberg	Murgtal	0,05
89.1	Radio 8	Hesselberg Wassertrüdingen	0,1
89.1	R.SA (Leipzig)	Oschatz	0,25
89.1	Bayern 2 (Südbayern)	Pfronten	0,05
89.1	Deutschlandfunk Kultur	Hamburg/Heinrich-Hertz-Turm	0,1
89.1	Radio BOB! (Schleswig-Holstein) (Nord/West)	Westerland (Sylt)	1
89.1	Radio Sauerland	Schmallenberg/Beerenberg	0,2
89.1		Kreuth	0,1
89.1	Bayern 1 (Schwaben)	Burgberg/Halden (Sonthofen)	0,01
89.1		Eichstätt/Schönblick	0,01
89.2	SWR2 (Baden-Württemberg)	Ulm/Kuhberg	10
89.2	SWR1 Baden-Württemberg	Blauen	8,4
89.2	NDR 2 (Niedersachsen)	Osnabrück/Schleptruper Egge	8
89.2	NDR Kultur	Schwerin	30
89.2	R.SA (Dresden)	Dresden-Wachwitz	2
89.2	Radio Eins	Coburg/Eckardtsberg	0,5
89.2	Deutschlandfunk (DLF)	Pforzheim-Dillweissenstein	0,1
89.2	Landeswelle Thüringen (Mitte)	Weimar/Großer Ettersberg	0,25
89.2	Freies Radio Freudenstadt	Horb	0,1
89.2	89.2 Radio Potsdam	Berlin/Schäferberg	0,5
89.2		Dalhausen	0,05
89.2	Bayern 1 (Oberbayern)	Garmisch-Partenk,/Kreuzeck	0,1
89.2	Deutschlandfunk (DLF)	Pössneck	0,1
89.2	Radio WSW	Weißwasser	1
89.2	Power Radio	Templin	1
89.2	Radio Zwickau	Meerane	0,1
89.2	Radio BLAU	Leipzig-Neuschönefeld	0,1
89.2	apollo radio	Leipzig-Neuschönefeld	0,1
89.3	hr3	Großer Feldberg (Taunus)/hr	100
89.3	SR 1 Europawelle	Merzig-Hilbringen	0,1
89.3	Deutschlandfunk Kultur	Hof/Großer Waldstein	20
89.3	Deutschlandfunk (DLF)	Wittenberg/Gallunberg	1
89.3	bremen eins	Schiffdorf (Bremerhaven) (nds)	25
89.3	RSA Radio (Oberallgäu)	Oberstdorf	0,1
89.3	Deutschlandfunk (DLF)	Kempten/Allgäu Tower	0,1
89.3	Bayern 2 (Südbayern)	Augsburg/Hotelturm	0,1
89.3	Deutschlandfunk (DLF)	Stralsund	0,25
89.3	Antenne 1 (Reutlingen)	Bad Urach (Ermstal)	0,025
89.3	Bayernwelle Südost (Berchtesgadener Land)	Berchtesgaden/Obersalzberg	0,1
89.3	Unser Radio Regen	Regen/Geißkopf	0,2
89.3	Radyo Metropol FM (Nordrhein-Westfalen)	Bochum-Wattenscheid	0,32
89.3	Deutschlandfunk (DLF)	Bergen (Soltau) Wardböhmen	0,13
89.3	Antenne Unna	Selm/Stadtverwaltung	0,25
89.3	MDR Aktuell	Stollberg	0,1
89.4	MDR Kultur	Dequede	10
89.4	Radyo Metropol FM (Nordrhein-Westfalen)	Herdecke/Rehberg	0,32
89.4	Radio 8	Ansbach/Telekom	0,5
89.4	Radio 21 (Mitte)	Bad Rehburg	0,5
89.4	NE-WS 89,4	Düsseldorf/Rheinturm	1
89.4	SWR2 (Rheinland-Pfalz)	Trier/Markusberg	0,1
89.4	L'UniCo FM	Paderborn/Uni	0,032
89.4	SWR1 Baden-Württemberg	Schramberg/Schloßberg	0,01
89.4	MDR Sputnik	Zeitz	0,5
89.4		Jarmen	0,2
89.5	hr3	Hoher Meißner	100
89.5	Bayern 2 (Südbayern)	Wendelstein	100
89.5	bigFM (Baden-Württemberg)	Stuttgarter Fernmeldeturm	10
89.5	NDR 1 Welle Nord (Norderstedt)	Hamburg-Moorfleet	10
89.5	Deutschlandfunk (DLF)	Idar-Oberstein Hillschied	0,2
89.5	Antenne 1 (Heilbronn)	Wertheim Kreuzwertheim	0,1
89.5	N-JOY	Neubrandenburg	1
89.5		Papenburg	0,5
89.5	104.6 RTL	Elsterwerda	0,5
89.5	MDR Aktuell	Jena-Oßmaritz	0,2
89.6	WDR 5	Bärbelkreuz (Eifel)	10
89.6	Bayern 2 (Nordbayern)	Bamberg/Geisberg	25
89.6	Radio Homburg	Homburg	1
89.6	Deutschlandfunk Kultur	Berliner Fernsehturm	20
89.6	NDR 1 Welle Nord (Flensburg)	Flensburg-Engelsby	25
89.6	MDR Aktuell	Burg	1
89.6		Visselhövede	0,63
89.6	bermuda.funk	Mannheim-Neckarstadt	0,1
89.6	RadioAktiv	Mannheim-Neckarstadt	0,1
89.6	R.SA (Chemnitz)	Markneukirchen	1
89.6	MDR JUMP	Halle/Gerberstraße	0,1
89.6	Deutschlandfunk (DLF)	Grimmen	0,2
89.6	Bayern 2 (Nordbayern)	Ludwigsstadt-Ebersdorf	0,05
89.6	MDR Aktuell	Neustadt (Sachsen)/Unger	0,2
89.6	SWR1 Baden-Württemberg	Blaubeuren	0,002
89.7	hr3	Würzberg	5
89.7	WDR 3	Münster/Baumberge	25
89.7	RPR1. (Mainz)	Bad Kreuznach/Schanzenkopf	0,1
89.7	bigFM (Baden-Württemberg)	Tübingen	1
89.7	hr-info	Fulda-Künzell/Peter Henlein Str.	0,2
89.7	gong fm	Regensburg/Ziegetsberg	0,3
89.7	Radio ZuSa	Dannenberg/Zernien	0,5
89.7	Deutschlandfunk Kultur	Hoyerswerda	0,5
89.7	hitradio.rt1 nordschwaben	Dillingen (Donau)	0,1
89.7	Bayern 2 (Nordbayern)	Burgsinn	0,01
89.7	Radio Paradiso	Rostock-Toitenwinkel	0,32
89.7	Unser Radio Passau	Bad Griesbach	0,3
89.7	Deutschlandfunk (DLF)	Weimar-Ehringsdorf	0,5
89.8	SWR1 Rheinland-Pfalz	Bad Marienberg	25
89.8	MDR JUMP	Chemnitz/Geyer	100
89.8	SWR1 Baden-Württemberg	Feldberg (Schwarzwald)	5
89.8	hr-info	Bad Orb (Spessart)	0,32
89.8	Energy Bremen (Bremen)	Bremen-Walle	1
89.8	MDR Kultur	Suhl/Erleshügel	0,2
89.8	Deutschlandfunk (DLF)	Demmin	1
89.8	Radio 8	Dinkelsbühl	0,1
89.8	TOP FM	Landsberg am Lech-Pößing	0,2
89.8	Radio Galaxy Amberg/Weiden	Weiden	0,1
89.8	Deutschlandfunk Kultur	Kempten/Allgäu Tower	0,063
89.8	SWR1 Baden-Württemberg	Creglingen	0,01
89.8	SWR4 Baden-Württemberg (Schwaben Radio)	Heidenheim a.d Brenz/Schloß Hellenstein	0,01
89.8	B5 aktuell	Mittenwald	0,01
89.8		Regen	0,01
89.8	Klassik Radio	Westerland (Sylt)	0,5
89.8	Klassik Radio	Helgoland	0,16
89.9	SWR1 Rheinland-Pfalz	Weinbiet	25
89.9	NDR Kultur	Torfhaus (Harz-West)	100
89.9	NDR Kultur	Bungsberg/NDR-Mast	50
89.9	Radyo Metropol FM (Nordrhein-Westfalen)	Köln/Sternengasse	0,1
89.9	AFN Bavaria-The Eagle	Amberg/Kennedystr.	0,25
89.9	BR Klassik	Bad Reichenhall/Kirchholz-Steilhofweg	0,32
89.9	MDR JUMP	Camburg	0,2
89.9	Bayernwelle Südost (Traunstein)	Reit im Winkl	0,1
89.9	Radyo Metropol FM (Hessen)	Friedberg	0,32
89.9	Radio Galaxy Passau	Deggendorf/Kohlberg	0,1
89.9	SWR1 Baden-Württemberg	Giengen an der Brenz	0,02
89.9	Radio Horeb	Ursberg	0,008
89.9		Eichstätt/Schönblick	0,01
90.0	SWR3 (Rheinland-Pfalz/Rheinland)	Haardtkopf	50
90.0	Bayern 2 (Nordbayern)	Würzburg/Frankenwarte, BR	5
90.0	NDR Kultur	Aurich	25
90.0	B5 aktuell	Ismaning	25
90.0	Deutschlandfunk Kultur	Röbel	3
90.0	ERF Pop	Wetzlar-Dalheim	0,05
90.0	CT das radio	Bochum/Ruhr-Uni	0,3
90.0	Radio 7 (Ulm)	Ulm-Wiblingen	0,32
90.0	MDR Aktuell	Dessau	0,3
90.0	Radio Eins	Kronach	0,1
90.0	WDR 5	Schmallenberg/Beerenberg	0,1
90.0	Film-Begleitton	Autokino Essen	
90.1	SWR4 Baden-Württemberg (Radio Stuttgart)	Stuttgarter Fernsehturm	100
90.1	MDR JUMP	Dresden-Wachwitz	100
90.1	Planet Radio	Dieburg	1
90.1	Planet Radio	Wiesbaden/Konrad Adenauer Ring	0,32
90.1	Deutschlandfunk (DLF)	Saarbrücken/Winterberg	1
90.1	Deutschlandfunk Kultur	Kleve-Materborn	1
90.1	MDR Aktuell	Salzwedel Fleetmark	2
90.1	NDR 1 Radio MV (Vorpommern)	Ueckermünde	4
90.1	Radio Unerhört	Marburg/Lahnberge	0,1
90.1	Radio 90,1	Mönchengladbach/FMT Korschenbroicher Str.	0,32
90.1	Radio 21 (Nordost)	Visselhövede	1
90.1	Deutschlandfunk (DLF)	Nürnberg-Schweinau	0,1
90.1	WDR 4	Bad Oeynhausen/Wittekindsberg	0,1
90.1	BR24	Augsburg/Hotelturm	0,1
90.1	Bayernwelle Südost (Traunstein)	Waging	0,05
90.1	Radio B2 (Mecklenburg-Vorpommern)	Schwerin	0,8
90.2	MDR JUMP	Inselsberg	100
90.2	Deutschlandfunk Kultur	Lorch Oberheimbach	0,2
90.2	NDR Kultur	Lingen-Damaschke	25
90.2	Radio BOB! (Hessen)	Limburg-Staffel	0,2
90.2	Radio Teddy	Berliner Fernsehturm	16
90.2	YOU FM (hr)	Bensheim-Auerbach	0,2
90.2		Rheinweiler	1
90.2	hitradio.rt1 südschwaben	Memmingen Bad Grönenbach	0,32
90.2	Radio Alpenwelle	Miesbach/Briefer	0,1
90.2	Lohro	Rostock-Toitenwinkel	0,1
90.2	Bayern 1 (Niederbayern/Oberpfalz)	Landshut-Altdorf	0,25
90.2		Pfronten	0,02
90.2	Bayern 1 (Schwaben)	Balderschwang/Kreuzle-Alm	0,02
90.2		Waldmünchen-Sinzendorf	0,005
90.2	BR Klassik	Burgberg/Halden (Sonthofen)	0,01
90.2		Bischofsreut	0,01
90.2	Film-Begleitton	Autokino Zempow	
90.2	Film-Begleitton	Autokino Neustrelitz	
90.3	WDR 5	Nordhelle	35
90.3	NDR 90,3	Hamburg-Moorfleet	80
90.3	Hit Radio FFH (Wiesbaden)	Eltville (Rheingau)	0,2
90.3		Kleinkarlbach-Battenberg	0,1
90.3	UnserDing (SR)	St. Wendel	0,1
90.3	Radio 8	Gunzenhausen Gräfensteinberg	0,1
90.3	Donau 3 FM	Günzburg	0,1
90.3	Radio Cottbus	Spremberg	0,5
90.3		Lampertheim	0,005
90.3		Forchheim/Bahnhof	0,05
90.3	Deutschlandfunk (DLF)	Landsberg am Lech	0,05
90.3	AFN Bavaria-The Eagle	Garmisch Partenk,/Breitenauer Str.	0,05
90.3	SWR1 Baden-Württemberg	Freudenberg (Main)/Kirschfurt	0,01
90.3	Deutschlandfunk (DLF)	Westerland (Sylt)	0,2
90.3		Bad Tölz-Gaißach	0,05
90.3	TOP FM	Dießen am Ammersee	0,05
90.3		Prien	0,02
90.4	MDR JUMP	Leipzig Wiederau	100
90.4	YOU FM (hr)	Frankfurt (Main) Maintower	0,5
90.4	SWR2 (Baden-Württemberg)	Witthoh (Tuttlingen)	40
90.4	SWR2 (Rheinland-Pfalz)	Kirn	0,01
90.4	Radio Charivari Würzburg	Lohr am Main Gemünden	0,1
90.4	Radio 8	Neustadt an der Aisch	0,2
90.4	NDR Info (Niedersachsen)	Seesen/Kleiner Schildberg	0,2
90.4	Radio Galaxy Oberfranken	Coburg/Eckardtsberg	0,2
90.4	Radio Oldenburg	Oldenburg-Wahnbek	0,5
90.4	Klassik Radio	Karlsruhe/EnBW-Kraftwerk	2
90.4	SWR4 Baden-Württemberg (Franken Radio)	Grünsfeld (Wittigbachtal)	0,05
90.4	Bayern 3	Passau/Kühberg	0,5
90.4	Bayern 1 (Oberbayern)	Berchtesgaden-Schönau	0,3
90.4	Inn-Salzach-Welle	Mühldorf am Inn	0,1
90.4	NDR 1 Niedersachsen (Braunschweig)	Wolfsburg-Klieversberg	0,1
90.4	105.9 Radio Paradiso	Guben	0,3
90.4	SWR2 (Baden-Württemberg)	Nagoldtal	0,01
90.5	Bayern 2 (Südbayern)	Gelbelsee	25
90.5	NDR 1 Radio MV (Neubrandenburg)	Helpterberg	100
90.5	Deutschlandfunk (DLF)	Boppard	0,1
90.5	NDR 1 Welle Nord (Heide)	Heide/Welmbüttel	15
90.5	SWR4 Rheinland-Pfalz (Radio Kaiserslautern)	Zweibrücken/Am Ölkorb	0,2
90.5	Hitradio Ohr	Oberachern	2
90.5	hr2	Schlüchtern/Alte Hohenzeller Str.	0,32
90.5	DASDING (SWR)	Mötzingen/Herrenberg	1
90.5	MDR Sputnik	Jerichow	1
90.5	Radio Primaton	Bad Kissingen	0,1
90.5	MDR Aktuell	Heiligenstadt	0,1
90.5	bigFM (Baden-Württemberg)	Heidenheim a.d Brenz/Schmittenberg	0,1
90.5	Radyo Metropol FM (Nordrhein-Westfalen)	Krefeld-Bockum	0,1
90.5		Braunschweig-Broitzem	0,1
90.5	hr4 (Mittelhessen)	Wetzlar/Stoppelberg	0,32
90.5	MDR Aktuell	Weißwasser	1
90.5		Tegernseer Tal/Ringberg	0,05
90.5	Radio BOB! (Hessen)	Rimberg	0,05
90.5	Film-Begleitton	Autokino Köln-Porz	
90.6	hr1	Hardberg	50
90.6	WDR 5	Teutoburger Wald/Bielstein	100
90.6	SWR3 (Rheinland-Pfalz/Rheinland)	Saarburg/Geisberg	5
90.6	Radio Brocken (Anhalt)	Dessau	1
90.6	Radio Nordseewelle	Aurich	1
90.6	Radio Teddy	Meiningen/Donopskuppe	0,1
90.6	R.SA (Chemnitz)	Freiberg/Hauptpostamt	0,2
90.6	Radio Nordseewelle	Borkum	0,2
90.6	Deutschlandfunk (DLF)	Neukloster	0,25
90.6	Deutschlandfunk Kultur	Freiburg-Stadt/DTAG	0,2
90.6	SWR1 Baden-Württemberg	Wiesensteig	0,01
90.6		Brandenburg-Stadt	0,8
90.7	WDR 4	Bonn-Venusberg	50
90.7	Bayern 1 (Franken)	Ochsenkopf	100
90.7	Bayern 1 (Schwaben)	Grünten	100
90.7	Antenne Frankfurt 95,1	Bad Nauheim-Nieder Mörlen	0,32
90.7	NDR Info (Niedersachsen)	Dannenberg/Zernien	3
90.7	Deutschlandfunk Kultur	Fulda-Künzell/Dicker Turm	0,3
90.7	YOU FM (hr)	Limburg/Schafsberg	0,2
90.7	NDR 2 (Schleswig-Holstein)	Lübeck/Wallanlagen	0,5
90.7	radioWeser,tv Bremerhaven	Schiffdorf (Bremerhaven) (nds)	0,2
90.7	88vier	Berlin/Schäferberg	0,1
90.7	radio TOP 40	Sondershausen	0,2
90.8	SWR1 Rheinland-Pfalz	Bornberg	25
90.8	DASDING (SWR)	Stuttgarter Fernsehturm	5
90.8	Deutschlandfunk Kultur	Cottbus/Calau	20
90.8	Radio Primavera	Alzenau/Hahnenkamm	0,2
90.8	Radio SAW (Harz)	Wernigerode	1
90.8	Radio Erzgebirge	Aue (Sachsen)	1
90.8	NDR Info (Schleswig-Holstein)	Neumünster Armstedt	1
90.8	Radio Herne	Herne	0,1
90.8	SWR1 Baden-Württemberg	Oberes Kinzigtal	0,1
90.8	Radio Charivari Regensburg (Cham)	Roding	0,32
90.8	hr-info	Sontra	0,05
90.8	NDR Kultur	Hann. Münden/Tannenkamp	0,05
90.8	Radio MK	Letmathe	0,032
90.8	radio TOP 40	Gotha	0,063
90.8	Camp FM	Leipzig Grosspösna	0,05
90.8	Bayern 1 (Oberbayern)	Bad Tölz-Gaißach	0,1
90.8	Antenne Brandenburg (Frankfurt)	Zehlendorf (Oranienburg)	1,3
90.8		Duderstadt	0,3
90.9	DASDING (SWR)	Bad Kreuznach/Kauzenburg	0,05
90.9	Bayern 1 (Mainfranken)	Würzburg/Frankenwarte, BR	5
90.9	NDR 1 Niedersachsen (Hannover/Messejournal)	Hannover Hemmingen	15
90.9	SWR1 Baden-Württemberg	Baden-Baden/Merkur	0,8
90.9	Antenne Thüringen (Mitte)	Jena-Oßmaritz	1
90.9	Radio Rüsselsheim	Rüsselsheim	0,32
90.9	NDR 1 Welle Nord (Flensburg)	Morsum (Sylt)	5
90.9	Radio Zwickau	Werdau	0,32
90.9	Radio Teddy	Eisenach	0,2
90.9	BB Radio (Brandenburg)	Rhinow	0,8
90.9	N-JOY	Mölln Fuhlenhagen	0,5
90.9	Bayern 1 (Schwaben)	Augsburg/Hotelturm	0,1
90.9	Radio Q	Münster/Universität	0,02
90.9	Radio Leipzig	Grimma	0,25
90.9	bigFM (Baden-Württemberg)	Heidelberg West	0,1
90.9	MDR Aktuell	Eisleben/Hergisdorf	0,1
91.0	hr1	Sackpfeife (Biedenkopf)	100
91.0	R.SA (Chemnitz)	Chemnitz-Reichenhain	3
91.0	NDR 1 Radio MV (Rostock)	Rostock-Toitenwinkel	100
91.0	egoFM	Fürth	0,5
91.0	Deutschlandfunk (DLF)	Wuppertal-Küllenhahn	0,25
91.0	SWR4 Rheinland-Pfalz (Radio Ludwigshafen)	Annweiler am Trifels	0,03
91.0	Deutschlandfunk Kultur	Steinfurt-Burgsteinfurt	0,2
91.0	MDR Aktuell	Gernrode Niederorschel	0,2
91.0	ALEX RADIO	Berlin-Schöneberg	0,4
91.0	N-JOY	Flensburg-Engelsby	0,6
91.0	MDR Aktuell	Gernrode (Quedlinburg)	0,1
91.0	Bayern 1 (Oberbayern)	Reit im Winkl	0,1
91.0		Wangerooge	0,08
91.0	radio TOP 40	Sömmerda	0,1
91.0	YOU FM (hr)	Michelstadt	0,2
91.0	Bayern 3	Herzogstand/Fahrenbergkopf (BR)	0,08
91.0		Frankfurt (Oder)/Booßen	0,5
91.1	hr3	Bingen	0,32
91.1	SWR2 (Baden-Württemberg)	Aalen	50
91.1	SWR1 Rheinland-Pfalz	Scharteberg (Eifel)	8
91.1	NDR 1 Niedersachsen (Oldenburg)	Steinkimmen	100
91.1	Antenne Brandenburg (Prenzlau)	Casekow	20
91.1	RPR1. (Ludwigshafen)	Kleinkarlbach-Battenberg	0,1
91.1	SWR4 Baden-Württemberg (Radio Südbaden)	Villingen-Schwenningen/Marbach	1
91.1	MDR Aktuell	Magdeburg/Frohser Berg	2
91.1	YOU FM (hr)	Witzenhausen	0,32
91.1	DASDING (SWR)	Freiburg-Lehen	0,5
91.1	Klassik Radio (Bayern)	Regensburg/Ziegetsberg	0,3
91.1	MDR JUMP	Suhl/Erleshügel	0,1
91.1	R.SA (Leipzig)	Torgau	0,2
91.1	MDR Aktuell	Gera-Langenberg	1
91.1	BR24	Burgsinn	0,01
91.1	Planet Radio	Darmstadt-Riedbahn	0,25
91.1	Radio Dresden	Dresden-Gompitz	1
91.1	MDR Sachsen-Anhalt (Halle)	Berga	0,48
91.1	NDR Info (Niedersachsen)	Alfeld (Leine)	0,05
91.2	BFBS Radio 2	Paderborn-Sennelager	0,1
91.2	SWR4 Baden-Württemberg (Bodensee Radio)	Waldburg	25
91.2	NDR 1 Niedersachsen (Lüneburg)	Dannenberg/Zernien	25
91.2	Bayern 1 (Niederbayern/Oberpfalz)	Ochsenkopf	20
91.2	Radio Bonn/Rhein-Sieg	Siegburg/Kreishaus	0,2
91.2	MDR Aktuell	Apolda	1
91.2	Radio 91,2	Dortmund/Florianturm	0,2
91.2	SWR3 (Baden/Kurpfalz)	Eberbach/Bocksberg	0,05
91.2	Deutschlandfunk Kultur	Frankfurt (Main)-Sachsenhausen	0,1
91.2	hr-info	Bensheim-Auerbach	0,06
91.2		Dalhausen	0,05
91.2	N-JOY	Bad Rothenfelde	0,1
91.2	SWR2 (Baden-Württemberg)	Freudenberg (Main)-Rauenberg	0,01
91.2	SWR3 (Alb/Bodensee)	Schramberg/Schloßberg	0,01
91.2	Lernradio	Bruchsal/Industriestr.	0,1
91.2	MDR Aktuell	Annaberg-Buchholz	0,2
91.2	R.SA (Leipzig)	Mügeln	0,5
91.3	SR 2 Kulturradio	Göttelborner Höhe	100
91.3	Deutschlandfunk (DLF)	Rimberg	50
91.3	NDR 1 Welle Nord (Kiel)	Kronshagen (Kiel)	15
91.3	DASDING (SWR)	Bad Marienberg	0,2
91.3	Bayern 1 (Oberbayern)	Ismaning	25
91.3	Radio Leipzig	Leipzig-Holzhausen	4
91.3	Deutschlandfunk (DLF)	Heilbronn-Neckargartach	0,1
91.3	Deutschlandfunk (DLF)	Köln/Sternengasse	0,1
91.3		Norden	0,25
91.3	Deutschlandfunk (DLF)	Waren (Müritz)	0,2
91.3	N-JOY	Stadthagen/Bückeberg	1
91.3		Niederkrüchten/Javelin Barracks	0,09
91.3	Deutschlandfunk (DLF)	Kirchheim (Teck)/Wasserturm	0,1
91.3	Radio Lippe	Augustdorf	0,05
91.3	MDR Aktuell	Stadtroda	0,2
91.3	r,s,2	Lauchhammer	1
91.3		Regen	0,01
91.3	Film-Begleitton	Autokino Kornwestheim, Leinwand 2	
91.3	Film-Begleitton	Autokino Aschheim, Leinwand 2	
91.3	Film-Begleitton	Autokino Berlin, Leinwand 2	
91.4	SWR4 Rheinland-Pfalz (Radio Mainz)	Mainz-Kastel	1
91.4	Bayern 1 (Franken)	Büttelberg	25
91.4	Berliner Rundfunk 91,4 (Berlin)	Berliner Fernsehturm	100
91.4	Die neue Welle (Freudenstadt)	Lützenhardt	3
91.4	Die neue Welle (Pforzheim)	Pforzheim/Wartberg	0,5
91.4	Radio Erft	Bergheim/Bahnhof	0,1
91.4	MDR Aktuell	Zwickau Ebersbrunn	1
91.4	N-JOY	Rosengarten-Langenrehm	0,3
91.4	Radio Oberland	Mittenwald	0,05
91.4		Bad Tölz-Gaißach	0,05
91.4	R.SA (Dresden)	Nossen	0,2
91.5	MDR JUMP	Brocken	100
91.5	DASDING (SWR)	Mannheim-Oststadt	4
91.5	Bayern 2 (Südbayern)	Hochberg (Traunstein)	5
91.5	NDR Kultur	Garz (Rügen)	10
91.5	hr-info	Schlüchtern/Alte Hohenzeller Str.	0,32
91.5	SWR Aktuell	Stuttgart/SWR-Funkhaus	0,3
91.5	Radio MK	Altena	0,1
91.5	Radio Ennepe Ruhr (Nord-Kreis)	Hattingen	0,1
91.5	Deutschlandfunk Kultur	Leer	0,5
91.5	Antenne Düsseldorf	Düsseldorf-Heerdt	0,02
91.5	R.SA (Chemnitz)	Oelsnitz (Vogtland)	0,1
91.5	Radio BOB! (Schleswig-Holstein) (Ost)	Lübeck-Stockelsdorf	0,3
91.5	N-JOY	Niebüll Süderlügum	0,4
91.5	Deutschlandfunk Kultur	Ulm-Ermingen	1
91.5	Bayern 3	Eichstätt/Schönblick	0,1
91.5	Deutschlandfunk (DLF)	Beckum/Höxberg	0,16
91.5	N-JOY	Helgoland	0,05
91.5	Film-Begleitton	Autokino Gravenbruch, Leinwand 1	
91.6	SWR3 (Rheinland-Pfalz/Rheinland)	Koblenz/Waldesch	40
91.6	Bayern 2 (Südbayern)	Hoher Bogen	50
91.6	N-JOY	Cuxhaven/Holter Höhe	10
91.6	YOU FM (hr)	Korbach/Eisenberg	0,5
91.6	Radio Galaxy Aschaffenburg	Aschaffenburg	0,1
91.6	Energy Berlin	Casekow	1,3
91.6	Antenne Zweibrücken	Zweibrücken/Funkturm	0,2
91.6	MDR Aktuell	Raschau	0,2
91.6	Radio B2 (Berlin/Brandenburg)	Cottbus Klein Oßnig	0,5
91.6	Deutschlandfunk Kultur	Grimma	0,1
91.6	SWR (Test)	Schorndorf-Oberberken	0,02
91.6	Deutschlandfunk Kultur	Lingen-Schepsdorf	0,4
91.6	Deutschlandfunk (DLF)	Berchtesgaden-Schönau	0,1
91.6	SWR4 Baden-Württemberg (Franken Radio)	Freudenberg (Main)/Kirschfurt	0,01
91.6		Ermatingen (Reichenau)/Oberzell	0,05
91.7	MDR Thüringen (Suhl)	Sonneberg/Bleßberg	100
91.7	Kulturradio (RBB)	Pritzwalk	10
91.7	Radio Teddy (Hessen)	Kassel/Tannenwäldchen	0,2
91.7	WDR 4	Arnsberg/Schloßberg	0,1
91.7	DASDING (SWR)	Trier/Markusberg	0,3
91.7	DASDING (SWR)	Baden-Baden/Fremersberg	0,5
91.7	WDR 3	Lübbecke/Bohlenstr.	0,1
91.7	Radio Herford	Vlotho/Winterberg	0,1
91.7	Radio Galaxy Passau	Passau-Haidenhof	0,2
91.7	Radio Alpenwelle	Holzkirchen	0,1
91.7	Radio Chemnitz	Zschopau	0,25
91.7		Fürstenfeldbruck Schöngeising	0,05
91.7	BFBS Germany	Friedrichsdorf	0,75
91.7	917xfm	Hamburg/Heinrich-Hertz-Turm	0,15
91.7	Radio K.W.	Moers/FMT Forststr.	0,1
91.7	Energy Berlin	Herzberg	0,1
91.7	Energy Sachsen (Dresden)	Riesa	1
91.7	Klassik Radio	Garding	0,5
91.8	SWR2 (Baden-Württemberg)	Raichberg	40
91.8	WDR 2 (Wuppertal)	Hohe Warte	10
91.8	Radio X	Frankfurt (Main) Europaturm	0,1
91.8	MDR JUMP	Löbau	5
91.8	NDR 1 Niedersachsen (Lüneburg)	Visselhövede	5
91.8	SWR2 (Baden-Württemberg)	Wertheim/Schloßberg	0,1
91.8	Radio Trausnitz	Pfeffenhausen	0,2
91.8	Power Radio	Eberswalde	1,3
91.8	NDR Kultur	Demmin	0,2
91.8	Deutschlandfunk Kultur	Zeitz	1
91.8	WDR 2 (Bielefeld)	Warburg/Stapelberg	0,5
91.8	R.SA	Hohenstein-Ernstthal	0,032
91.8	Power Radio	Zehlendorf (Oranienburg)	1,3
91.8	Radio Argovia	Waldshut/Aarberg	0,5
91.9	hr4 (Nord-Osthessen)	Rimberg	20
91.9	Bayern 1 (Schwaben)	Hühnerberg	25
91.9	SR 1 Europawelle	Moseltal (Perl)	5
91.9	NDR 2 (Schleswig-Holstein)	Bungsberg/NDR-Mast	50
91.9	Fritz (RBB)	Belzig	30
91.9	SWR1 Baden-Württemberg	Buchen/Walldürner Straße	0,1
91.9	WDR 4	Monschau/St. Michael Gymnasium	0,05
91.9	Radio 21 (Nordost)	Lüneburg-Neu Wendhausen	0,1
91.9	Deutschlandfunk (DLF)	Mittenwald/Partenkirchner Straße	0,05
92.0	SWR2 (Rheinland-Pfalz)	Donnersberg	60
92.0	WDR 5	Münster/Baumberge	25
92.0	Radio PSR (Chemnitz)	Auerbach/Schöneck	10
92.0	Bayern 2 (Südbayern)	Lindau/Hoyerberg	0,5
92.0	domradio	Pulheim/Walzwerk	0,05
92.0	Deutschlandfunk Kultur	Eilenburg	0,2
92.0	Deutschlandfunk (DLF)	Oberstdorf	0,1
92.0	Radio Alpenwelle	Wolfratshausen Geretsried	0,1
92.0		Schongau	0,05
92.0	Radio BOB! (Schleswig-Holstein) (Nord/West)	Husum	0,1
92.0	Radio SRF 1 (Ostschweiz)	Wangen-Salen/Unterbühlhof	0,1
92.1	NDR 2 (Niedersachsen)	Torfhaus (Harz-West)	100
92.1	Bayern 1 (Niederbayern/Oberpfalz)	Brotjacklriegel	100
92.1	SWR2 (Rheinland-Pfalz)	Altenahr (Oberes Ahrtal)	0,3
92.1	hr-info	Friedberg	0,32
92.1	Klassik Radio (Bayern)	Würzburg/Frankenwarte, DTAG (1)	0,3
92.1	SR 2 Kulturradio	Merzig-Hilbringen	0,1
92.1	Deutschlandfunk (DLF)	Freiburg-Mooswald	0,2
92.1	Radius 92,1	Siegen/Uni Hölderlin-Gebäude	0,032
92.1	Bremen NEXT	Schiffdorf (Bremerhaven) (nds)	25
92.1	Deutschlandfunk Kultur	Stralsund	0,4
92.1	Radio Cottbus	Guben	1
92.1	harmony.fm	Limburg-Staffel	0,2
92.1	Antenne Thüringen (Süd)	Suhl/Domberg	0,1
92.1	RSA Radio (Oberallgäu)	Oberstaufen	0,05
92.1	Deutschlandfunk Kultur	Flensburg/Wassersleben	0,16
92.1	Radio Bamberg	Bamberg Buttenheim/Kälberberg	0,2
92.2	SWR3 (Württemberg)	Stuttgarter Fernsehturm	100
92.2	MDR Sachsen (Dresden)	Dresden-Wachwitz	100
92.2		Daun/Mühlenberg	0,08
92.2	Deutschlandfunk (DLF)	Lemgo/Wiembecker Berg	0,32
92.2	Radio RSG	Remscheid-Hohenhagen	0,1
92.2	Radio Duisburg	Duisburg/FMT Saarstr.	0,1
92.2	Klassik Radio (Bayern)	Augsburg/Hotelturm	0,2
92.2	Radio Eins	Neustadt bei Coburg	0,05
92.2	Ostseewelle (Ost)	Röbel	0,2
92.2	Bayern 1 (Mainfranken)	Burgsinn	0,01
92.2		Memmingen-Memmingerberg	0,05
92.2	Bayern 2 (Südbayern)	Oberammergau/Laber	0,1
92.2	BR Klassik	Ludwigsstadt-Ebersdorf	0,05
92.2	Deutschlandfunk Kultur	Heide	0,1
92.2	Bayern 2 (Südbayern)	Burgberg/Halden (Sonthofen)	0,01
92.3	YOU FM (hr)	Bingen	0,32
92.3	WDR 2 (Siegen)	Sackpfeife (Wittgenstein)	15
92.3	SR 1 Europawelle	Bliestal	5
92.3	Bayern 2 (Nordbayern)	Dillberg	25
92.3	NDR Info (Hamburg)	Hamburg-Moorfleet	5
92.3	MDR Sachsen-Anhalt (Halle)	Naumburg	1
92.3		Trier/Uni	0,05
92.3	Inforadio (RBB)	Perleberg	1
92.3	N-JOY	Heringsdorf (Usedom)	1
92.3		Grenzach-Wyhlen	0,05
92.3	Bayern 1 (Schwaben)	Pfronten	0,05
92.3		Rheindahlen/JHQ (Mönchengladbach)	1
92.3	Radio Charivari Rosenheim	Rosenheim/FMT	0,05
92.3	R.SA (Chemnitz)	Wilkau-Haßlau	0,5
92.3		Recklinghausen Süd	0,001
92.4	SWR1 Rheinland-Pfalz	Linz (Rhein)/Ginsterhahner Kopf	50
92.4	Kulturradio (RBB)	Berlin/Scholzplatz	80
92.4		Bad Kreuznach/Kauzenburg	0,05
92.4	NDR 1 Niedersachsen (Osnabrück)	Osnabrück/Schleptruper Egge	8
92.4	SWR1 Baden-Württemberg	Witthoh (Tuttlingen)	40
92.4	SWR3 Renn-Radio / DTM Live	Hockenheim/Hockenheimring	0,5
92.4	Radio BOB! (Hessen)	Hanau/Fernmeldegebäude	0,2
92.4	CRM 92,4	München/Olympiaturm	0,32
92.4	Radio Feierwerk	München/Olympiaturm	0,32
92.4	Radio Horeb	München/Olympiaturm	0,32
92.4	Radio LORA	München/Olympiaturm	0,32
92.4	Radio München	München/Olympiaturm	0,32
92.4	SWR1 Baden-Württemberg	Grünsfeld (Wittigbachtal)	0,05
92.4	Vogtland Radio	Schleiz	0,2
92.4	Radio BOB! (Hessen)	Darmstadt/Office Tower	0,2
92.4	SWR3 (Württemberg)	Freudenberg (Main)-Rauenberg	0,01
92.4	MDR Aktuell	Eilenburg	0,2
92.4	R.SA (Chemnitz)	Reichenbach Mylau	0,2
92.4	sunshine live (Rostock)	Rostock-Toitenwinkel	0,1
92.4	Bayern 2 (Südbayern)	Mittenwald	0,01
92.4	Radio BOB! (Schleswig-Holstein) (Nord/West)	Schleswig	1
92.5	MDR Thüringen (Erfurt)	Inselsberg	100
92.5	Radio Rheinwelle 92,5	Wiesbaden/Konrad Adenauer Ring	0,1
92.5	Radio MK	Iserlohn/Seilerberg	1
92.5	DASDING (SWR)	Kaiserslautern/Vorderer Rotenberg	0,25
92.5		Dülmen	8
92.5	radio hbw	Aschersleben	1
92.5	N-JOY	Papenburg	0,5
92.5	NDR 2 (Mecklenburg-Vorpommern)	Demmin	1
92.5	radioWeser,tv Bremen	Bremen-Walle	0,2
92.5	SWR1 Baden-Württemberg	Bad Wildbad (Enztal)	0,01
92.5	SWR2 (Baden-Württemberg)	Creglingen	0,01
92.5		Kreuth	0,1
92.5	NDR Info (Schleswig-Holstein)	Helgoland	0,05
92.6	SWR1 Baden-Württemberg	Ulm/Kuhberg	10
92.6	SWR2 (Baden-Württemberg)	Blauen	8,4
92.6	bigFM (Saarland)	Merzig-Hilbringen	0,5
92.6	Radio WAF	Sendenhorst	1
92.6	Radio SAW (Anhalt)	Dessau	2
92.6	Radio BOB! (Hessen)	Gießen/Dünsberg	0,1
92.6		Hilden	0,5
92.6	N-JOY	Hannover Hemmingen	2,5
92.6	SWR3 (Rheinland-Pfalz/Rheinland)	Alf-Bullay	0,01
92.6	Radio Charivari Würzburg	Ochsenfurt	0,05
92.6	Radio Alpenwelle	Bayrischzell	0,1
92.6	Deutschlandfunk Kultur	Bad Reichenhall/Kirchholz-Steilhofweg	0,05
92.6	Antenne Bayern	Pfaffenhofen an der Ilm/Wolfsberg	0,5
92.6	NDR 2 (Niedersachsen)	Bad Pyrmont/Hamberg	0,05
92.7	hr3	Hardberg	50
92.7	bigFM (Baden-Württemberg)	Horb	1
92.7	Radio Rur	Düren/FMT Großhau	0,5
92.7	Deutschlandfunk Kultur	Frankfurt (Oder)/Booßen	5
92.7	N-JOY	Aurich	1,6
92.7	NDR Info (Schleswig-Holstein)	Morsum (Sylt)	5
92.7	NDR 1 Niedersachsen (Braunschweig)	Holzminden Stahle	0,5
92.7	Deutschlandfunk (DLF)	Kassel/Tannenwäldchen	0,1
92.7	Radio Charivari Regensburg (Cham)	Hoher Bogen	0,4
92.7	Deutschlandfunk (DLF)	Ansbach-Galgenmühle	0,2
92.7	Inn-Salzach-Welle	Reichertsheim	0,3
92.7	WDR 3	Bad Oeynhausen/Wittekindsberg	0,1
92.7	Radio Galaxy Bayreuth	Bayreuth/Oschenberg	0,1
92.7	Deutschlandfunk Kultur	Prenzlau	0,5
92.7	Klassik Radio	Itzehoe	0,5
92.7	RSA Radio (Bodensee)	Weiler (Allgäu)/Simmerberg	0,1
92.7	Radio Ennepe Ruhr (Nord-Kreis)	Herdecke/Rehberg	0,5
92.7		Goslar/Schalke	0,1
92.8	SWR3 (Rheinland-Pfalz/Rheinland)	Bad Marienberg	25
92.8	MDR Sachsen (Chemnitz)	Chemnitz/Geyer	100
92.8	Bayern 1 (Oberbayern)	Hohenpeißenberg	25
92.8	NDR 1 Niedersachsen (Osnabrück)	Lingen-Damaschke	15
92.8	NDR 1 Radio MV (Schwerin)	Schwerin	32
92.8	SWR2 (Baden-Württemberg)	Wannenberg	2,6
92.8	BR24	Coburg/Eckardtsberg	0,3
92.8	Deutschlandfunk (DLF)	Korbach/An der Strother Str.	0,1
92.8	SWR3 (Alb/Bodensee)	Zwiefalten (Donautal)	0,1
92.8		Hindelang	0,01
92.8	N-JOY	Schiffdorf (Bremerhaven) (nds)	0,05
92.8	Radio NRÜ 92,8 FM	Neustadt am Rübenberge	0,001
92.8	Serengeti Safari Radio	Hodenhagen	0,001
92.9	SWR1 Baden-Württemberg	Langenbrand	5
92.9	SWR4 Rheinland-Pfalz (Radio Mainz)	Nierstein-Oppenheim - Geinsheim	0,1
92.9		Kitzingen	1
92.9	Classic Rock Radio	Saarbrücken/Winterberg	1
92.9	MDR Sachsen-Anhalt (Halle)	Eisleben/Hergisdorf	1
92.9	AREF	Nürnberg-Schweinau	0,32
92.9	Hit Radio N1	Nürnberg-Schweinau	0,32
92.9	Pray92,9	Nürnberg-Schweinau	0,32
92.9	Camillo	Nürnberg-Schweinau	0,32
92.9	Radio Mülheim	Mülheim (Ruhr)	0,5
92.9	N-JOY	Steinkimmen	1
92.9		Selm/Betonwerk	0,1
92.9	Klassik Radio	Rendsburg	0,5
92.9	NDR Info (Niedersachsen)	Hann. Münden/Tannenkamp	0,05
92.9	Inforadio (RBB)	Lübben	0,4
92.9	Planet Radio	Reinhardshain	0,2
92.9	MDR Thüringen (Gera)	Magdala	0,01
92.9	N-JOY	Alfeld (Leine)	0,05
92.9	Radio SRF 1 (Ostschweiz)	Ermatingen (Reichenau)/Oberzell	0,05
93.0	SWR2 (Rheinland-Pfalz)	Haardtkopf	50
93.0	N-JOY	Braunschweig/Drachenberg	40
93.0	Bayern 2 (Südbayern)	Hohe Linie	25
93.0	SWR1 Baden-Württemberg	Geislingen/Oberböhringen	0,5
93.0	Radio WMW	Ahaus	0,5
93.0	MDR Sachsen (Bautzen)	Hoyerswerda	1
93.0	Schwarzwald Radio	Haslach (Kinzigtal)/Galgenbühl	0,1
93.0	elDOradio	Dortmund/Universität	0,05
93.0	Freies Sender-Kombinat (FSK)	Hamburg/Heinrich-Hertz-Turm	0,2
93.0	MDR Kultur	Torgau	0,2
93.0	ROCK ANTENNE (Ebersberg)	Kirchseeon	0,63
93.0	RSA Radio (Oberallgäu)	Immenstadt	0,1
93.0	MDR Aktuell	Ilmenau	0,1
93.0	Ostseewelle (Ost)	Waren (Müritz)	0,2
93.0	harmony.fm	Darmstadt-Riedbahn	0,2
93.0		Pfronten	0,02
93.0		Bischofsreut	0,01
93.0	Radio Teddy	Stralsund	0,13
93.1	WDR 3	Bonn-Venusberg	50
93.1	Bayern 2 (Nordbayern)	Kreuzberg (Rhön)	100
93.1	BR Klassik	Hühnerberg	10
93.1	Inforadio (RBB)	Berlin/Scholzplatz	25
93.1	hr2	Wiesbaden/Zircon Tower	0,1
93.1	NDR Info (Niedersachsen)	Cuxhaven/Holter Höhe	10
93.1	Radio Neckarburg	Rottweil-Zimmern	1
93.1	SWR2 (Baden-Württemberg)	Stuttgart/SWR-Funkhaus	0,2
93.1		Erndtebrück	0,1
93.1	DASDING (SWR)	Heilbronn/Weinsberg	0,15
93.1	MDR Sputnik	Naumburg	0,5
93.1	NDR 1 Welle Nord (Lübeck)	Lübeck/Wallanlagen	0,5
93.1	BR Klassik	Reit im Winkl	0,1
93.1	Inn-Salzach-Welle	Burgkirchen	0,1
93.1	BR Klassik	Oberammergau/Laber	0,1
93.1	Bayern 3	Ludwigsstadt-Ebersdorf	0,05
93.2	WDR 2 (Bielefeld)	Teutoburger Wald/Bielstein	100
93.2	SWR2 (Baden-Württemberg)	Bad Mergentheim-Löffelstelzen	10
93.2	Rockland Radio (Rhein-Neckar)	Mannheim/Luisenpark	1
93.2	NDR 2 (Schleswig-Holstein)	Flensburg-Engelsby	25
93.2		Bernburg	1
93.2	hr-info	Wetzlar-Aßlar Klein Altenstädten	0,32
93.2	Deutschlandfunk Kultur	Dresden-Wachwitz	1
93.2		Nagoldtal	0,1
93.2	Bayern 2 (Südbayern)	Passau/Kühberg	0,5
93.2	N-JOY	Wolgast	0,3
93.2	MDR Aktuell	Genthin	0,1
93.2	harmony.fm	Idstein	0,5
93.2	BR Klassik	Landshut-Altdorf	0,25
93.2	Deutschlandfunk Kultur	Bad Tölz-Gaißach	0,1
93.2	Antenne Thüringen (Ost)	Bad Lobenstein/Sieglitzberg	1
93.3	SWR3 (Rheinland-Pfalz/Rheinland)	Rüdesheim (Bingen)	0,1
93.3	MDR Thüringen (Erfurt)	Weimar/Großer Ettersberg	5
93.3	NDR Kultur	Dannenberg/Zernien	10
93.3	WDR 2 (Rhein-Ruhr)	Kleve/Bresserberg	2
93.3	SWR4 Rheinland-Pfalz (Radio Koblenz)	Altenahr (Oberes Ahrtal)	0,1
93.3	SWR3 (Rheinland-Pfalz/Rheinland)	Kirn	0,01
93.3	SWR1 Baden-Württemberg	Eberbach/Bocksberg	0,05
93.3	Deutschlandfunk Kultur	Marburg/Lahnberge	0,05
93.3	Energy München	München/Olympiaturm	0,32
93.3	Energy Sachsen (Leipzig)	Grimma	0,25
93.3	Radio Mainwelle	Hohenmirsberg	0,1
93.3	MDR Aktuell	Greiz	0,2
93.3	Power Radio	Schwedt	0,5
93.3		Pfarrkirchen Postmünster	0,1
93.3	Radio Charivari Regensburg (Neumarkt)	Neumarkt	0,05
93.3	N-JOY	Meppen	0,05
93.3		Eichstätt/Schönblick	0,01
93.4	Bayern 3	Pfaffenberg	25
93.4	Inforadio (RBB)/Sorbisches Prog.	Cottbus/Calau	30
93.4	SWR2 (Rheinland-Pfalz)	Diez/Geisenberg (Lahntal)	0,1
93.4	Radio 21 (Süd)	Göttingen/Bovenden	1
93.4	Deutschlandfunk Kultur	Emden	1
93.4	R.SA (Chemnitz)	Stollberg	1
93.4	Radio Fantasy	Augsburg/Hotelturm	0,32
93.4	delta radio (Süd)	Hamburg/Heinrich-Hertz-Turm	1,6
93.4	Radio Galaxy Oberfranken	Selb	0,1
93.4	N-JOY	Bad Bentheim	0,05
93.4		Regen	0,01
93.4	Freies Radio Neumünster	Neumünster	0,05
93.4	NDR 2 (Schleswig-Holstein)	Helgoland	0,05
93.5	SWR1 Baden-Württemberg	Hornisgrinde	80
93.5	WDR 2 (Siegen)	Nordhelle	35
93.5	SWR3 (Rheinland-Pfalz/Rheinland)	Bad Kreuznach/Kauzenburg	0,05
93.5	Bayern 1 (Franken)	Coburg/Eckardtsberg	5
93.5	Radio Brocken (Halle)	Halle/Petersberg	5
93.5	NDR 2 (Mecklenburg-Vorpommern)	Rostock-Toitenwinkel	40
93.5	radio TOP 40	Eisenach	0,2
93.5	AFN Bavaria-The Eagle	Hohenfels	0,25
93.5	N-JOY	Molbergen-Peheim (Cloppenburg)	1,6
93.5	Bayern 2 (Südbayern)	Garmisch-Partenk,/Kreuzeck	0,1
93.5	Bayern 3	Pfronten	0,05
93.5	Radio 21 (Mitte)	Celle/Sägemühlenstr.	0,2
93.5	R.SA (Chemnitz)	Plauen/Tannenhof	1
93.5	Radio Teddy (Hessen)	Rotenburg an der Fulda	0,05
93.6	SWR4 Rheinland-Pfalz (Radio Trier)	Scharteberg (Eifel)	8
93.6	YOU FM (hr)	Fulda-Künzell/Peter Henlein Str.	0,3
93.6	Jam FM	Berliner Fernsehturm	2,4
93.6	MDR Thüringen (Heiligenstadt)	Heiligenstadt	0,1
93.6	Radio BOB! (Schleswig-Holstein) (Mitte)	Rendsburg	0,5
93.6	Energy Nürnberg	Erlangen	0,1
93.6	WDR Eins Live	Lübbecke/Bohlenstr.	0,1
93.6	Radio Primaton	Gerolzhofen	0,05
93.6	Antenne Bayern	Sonthofen	0,1
93.6	Deutschlandfunk Kultur	Gera/Stadtwald	0,32
93.6	alsterradio 106,8	Cuxhaven Otterndorf	2,7
93.6	Klassik Radio	Lübeck Berkenthin	1
93.6	Radio Ramasuri	Waidhaus Georgenberg	0,05
93.6	SWR3 (Württemberg)	Giengen an der Brenz	0,02
93.6	NDR Info (Niedersachsen)	Braunlage	0,02
93.6	NDR 2 (Niedersachsen)	Alfeld (Leine)	0,05
93.7	SWR3 (Rheinland-Pfalz/Rheinland)	Mainz-Kastel	1
93.7	Bayern 1 (Oberbayern)	Wendelstein	100
93.7	Radyo Metropol FM (Nordrhein-Westfalen)	Mülheim (Ruhr)	0,5
93.7	MDR Thüringen (Suhl)	Suhl/Erleshügel	0,7
93.7	Radio Hochstift	Paderborn/Rathenaustr.	0,1
93.7	SWR1 Baden-Württemberg	Zwiefalten (Donautal)	0,1
93.7	MDR Sachsen (Chemnitz)	Klingenthal/Aschberg	0,2
93.7		Kulmbach/Rehberg	0,1
93.7	NDR 2 (Niedersachsen)	Goslar-Sudmerberg	0,1
93.7	MDR Aktuell	Nordhausen	0,08
93.7	MDR Aktuell	Freiberg/Hauptpostamt	0,2
93.7	Planet Radio	Gießen/DTAG	0,5
93.7	hr2	Kassel-Wilhelmshöhe	0,5
93.7	N-JOY	Hameln Stadt	0,05
93.7	Radio Eins	Ludwigsstadt	0,02
93.7	NDR 1 Radio MV (Vorpommern)	Pasewalk	2,5
93.7	Radio Brocken (Halle)	Eisleben/Hergisdorf	1
93.7	Ostseewelle (West)	Wismar/Werft	0,1
93.7	N-JOY	Husum	0,05
93.7	Radio BOB! (Schleswig-Holstein) (Hamburg)	Hamburg-Bergedorf	0,025
93.8	SWR2 (Baden-Württemberg)	Waldenburg	100
93.8	bremen eins	Bremen-Walle	100
93.8	SWR2 (Rheinland-Pfalz)	Saarburg/Geisberg	5
93.8	SWR3 (Baden/Kurpfalz)	Feldberg (Schwarzwald)	5
93.8	Antenne MV (Ost)	Röbel	5
93.8	Radio Teddy (Hessen)	Bad Hersfeld	0,32
93.8	radio TOP 40	Mühlhausen	0,16
93.8		Steinach	0,1
93.8	WDR 2 (Siegen)	Schmallenberg/Beerenberg	0,1
93.8		Greifswald	0,5
93.8	Radio 38 (WO)	Wolfsburg-Klieversberg	0,1
93.9	SWR2 (Rheinland-Pfalz)	Bornberg	25
93.9	WDR 4	Aachen/Stolberg	20
93.9	MDR Sachsen (Leipzig)	Leipzig Wiederau	100
93.9	YOU FM (hr)	Marburg/Spiegelslust	1
93.9	WDR 5	Holzminden Höxter	0,5
93.9	Planet Radio	Gelnhausen-Höchst	0,2
93.9	hitradio.rt1 südschwaben	Mindelheim	0,3
93.9	Unser Radio Passau	Windorf	0,3
93.9	MDR Aktuell	Kamenz West	1
93.9	Deutschlandfunk (DLF)	Bad Oeynhausen/Wittekindsberg	0,05
93.9	Sender KW	Fürstenwalde/Rauener Berge	3
93.9	Deutschlandfunk (DLF)	Tübingen	0,5
93.9	Klassik Radio	Güby (Schleswig)	0,5
94.0	SWR2 (Rheinland-Pfalz)	Koblenz/Waldesch	40
94.0	SWR4 Rheinland-Pfalz (Radio Mainz)	Worms	1
94.0	YOU FM (hr)	Friedberg	0,32
94.0	Radio Charivari Regensburg (Neumarkt)	Seubersdorf	1
94.0	Radio B46	Michelstadt	0,1
94.0	Bayern 3	Lindau/Hoyerberg	0,5
94.0	N-JOY	Dannenberg/Zernien	1
94.0	Radio Primaton	Bad Brückenau	0,1
94.0	Radio Ostfriesland	Aurich-Haxtum	1
94.0	MDR Aktuell	Bad Salzungen	0,1
94.0	Radio Galaxy Oberfranken	Hof/Labyrinthberg	0,2
94.0	NDR 2 (Mecklenburg-Vorpommern)	Heringsdorf (Usedom)	1
94.0	N-JOY	Lübeck/Wallanlagen	0,5
94.0	Planet Radio	Korbach/An der Strother Str.	0,2
94.0	Deutschlandfunk (DLF)	Heidenheim a.d Brenz/Schmittenberg	0,1
94.0	Deutschlandfunk (DLF)	Hannover/Telemax	0,1
94.0	Bayern 1 (Oberbayern)	Tegernseer Tal/Wallberg	0,1
94.0	hitradio.rt1	Aichach	0,02
94.0	SWR4 Baden-Württemberg (Radio Südbaden)	Hornisgrinde	0,63
94.0	Deutschlandfunk (DLF)	Gotha	0,1
94.1	WDR 2 (Münster)	Münster/Baumberge	25
94.1	Antenne Mainz (Bodenheim)	Mommenheim	0,32
94.1	NDR 2 (Niedersachsen)	Göttingen-Nikolausberg	5
94.1	Deutschlandfunk (DLF)	Ludwigsburg/Wasserturm	0,5
94.1	Radio 21 (Ost)	Helmstedt	0,5
94.1	SWR3 (Württemberg)	Buchen/Walldürner Straße	0,05
94.1		Cuxhaven Otterndorf	1
94.1	SWR3 (Württemberg)	Grünsfeld (Wittigbachtal)	0,05
94.1	Rockland Sachsen-Anhalt	Dessau	0,3
94.1	SWR4 Baden-Württemberg (Schwaben Radio)	Bopfingen	0,1
94.1	Radio BOB! (Schleswig-Holstein) (Nord/West)	Garding	0,5
94.1	NDR 1 Radio MV (Rostock)	Güstrow	0,1
94.1	harmony.fm	Alsfeld	0,05
94.2	Deutschlandfunk Kultur	Sonneberg/Bleßberg	100
94.2	Bayern 2 (Südbayern)	Hohenpeißenberg	25
94.2	Antenne Pfalz	Neustadt an der Weinstraße	1
94.2	Radio Bonn/Rhein-Sieg	Lohmar/FMT Birk (Much)	0,5
94.2	bigFM (Saarland)	Saarbrücken-Halberg	1
94.2	Deutschlandfunk (DLF)	Siegen-Fischbacherberg	0,1
94.2	WDR 2 (Aachen)	Monschau/St. Michael Gymnasium	0,05
94.2	MDR Aktuell	Hoyerswerda	1
94.2	Bayern 3	Berchtesgaden-Schönau	0,3
94.2	N-JOY	Hamburg-Moorfleet	1
94.2	NDR 1 Radio MV (Vorpommern)	Helpterberg	6,3
94.2	Inforadio (RBB)	Pritzwalk	0,5
94.2	N-JOY	Bad Pyrmont/Hamberg	0,05
94.3	SWR3 (Alb/Bodensee)	Raichberg	40
94.3	r,s,2	Berliner Fernsehturm	25
94.3	Deutschlandfunk Kultur	Trier/Petrisberg	0,2
94.3	Deutschlandfunk Kultur	Burgbernheim	0,32
94.3	Radio RSG	Solingen	0,2
94.3	NDR Kultur	Morsum (Sylt)	5
94.3	Radio Lausitz	Zittau	0,32
94.3	hr1	Kassel-Wilhelmshöhe	0,5
94.3	NDR 1 Radio MV (Rostock)	Bad Doberan	0,2
94.3	MDR Aktuell	Marienberg	0,1
94.3	SWR3 (Alb/Bodensee)	Bad Wildbad (Enztal)	0,1
94.3	Deutschlandfunk (DLF)	Gera/Stadtwald	0,2
94.3	WDR 3	Warburg/Stapelberg	0,5
94.3	Antenne Bethel	Bielefeld-Eckardtsheim	0,005
94.3	Antenne Bethel	Bielefeld-Gadderbaum	0,003
94.4	hr1	Großer Feldberg (Taunus)/hr	100
94.4	NDR Kultur	Steinkimmen	100
94.4	Bayern 3	Brotjacklriegel	100
94.4	Power Radio	Perleberg	1,3
94.4	MDR Thüringen (Erfurt)	Erfurt-Haarberg	2
94.4	N-JOY	Malchin/Hardtberg	1
94.4	R.SA (Chemnitz)	Freiberg Niederschöna	0,5
94.4	Radio BLAU	Leipzig-Stahmeln	0,25
94.4	Deutschlandfunk Kultur	Pirmasens/Biebermühler Str.	0,4
94.4	apollo radio	Leipzig-Stahmeln	0,25
94.5	SWR4 Baden-Württemberg (Schwaben Radio)	Ulm/Kuhberg	10
94.5	N-JOY	Kronshagen (Kiel)	15
94.5	Deutschlandfunk (DLF)	Auerbach/Schöneck	3
94.5	Jazztime Nürnberg	Nürnberg-Schweinau	0,32
94.5	Radio F	Nürnberg-Schweinau	0,32
94.5	Deutschlandfunk (DLF)	Paderborn/Rathenaustr.	0,2
94.5	SWR3 (Baden/Kurpfalz)	Oberes Kinzigtal	0,1
94.5	Deutschlandfunk (DLF)	Herzberg	0,32
94.5		Bad Kissingen	0,3
94.5	Deutschlandfunk Kultur	Konstanz	0,2
94.5	Rock Antenne	München/Blutenburgstr.	0,1
94.5	MDR Sachsen (Bautzen)	Seifhennersdorf	0,24
94.5	Schülerradio Stadthagen	Stadthagen/Schloßparkschule	0,006
94.5	Radio Cottbus	Cottbus-Madlow	0,3
94.6	MDR Sachsen-Anhalt (Magdeburg)	Brocken	60
94.6	Radio Neunkirchen	Neunkirchen (Saar)/Koßmannstr	0,63
94.6	B-Radio	Birkenau	0,1
94.6	SWR Maimarkt-Radio	Mannheim-Oststadt	0,1
94.6	SWR4 Rheinland-Pfalz (Radio Trier)	Bleialf	0,1
94.6	SWR3 (Württemberg)	Wertheim/Schloßberg	0,1
94.6	Radio IN (Radio ND1)	Schrobenhausen	0,3
94.6	Radio Vest	Recklinghausen/Quellberg	0,1
94.6	Antenne Bayern	Inntal Oberaudorf	0,3
94.6	Radio MK	Balve	0,02
94.6	NDR 1 Radio MV (Vorpommern)	Anklam	6,3
94.6	NDR Kultur	Cuxhaven/Holter Höhe	1
94.6	Radio ventex Raffelsberg	Hürtgenwald	0,0063
94.6	Deutschlandfunk Kultur	Gronau	0,2
94.7	SWR1 Baden-Württemberg	Stuttgarter Fernsehturm	100
94.7	Bayern 3	Hoher Bogen	50
94.7	Deutschlandfunk Kultur	Idar-Oberstein Hillschied	0,2
94.7	NDR Kultur	Röbel	10
94.7	hr2	Bad Orb (Spessart)	0,32
94.7	MDR Aktuell	Meiningen Walldorf	0,2
94.7	baden.fm	Freiburg-Lehen	0,5
94.7	MDR Kultur	Hoyerswerda	1
94.7	Radio WAF	Warendorf	0,2
94.7	Radio BOB! (Hessen)	Hoherodskopf (Vogelsberg)	0,1
94.7	NDR 1 Welle Nord (Lübeck)	Lauenburg Echem	0,3
94.7	Radio FH	Meschede/FH	0,05
94.7	MDR Aktuell	Chemnitz-Reichenhain	0,5
94.7	Deutschlandfunk Kultur	Starnberg/Gautinger Str.	0,1
94.7	Deutschlandfunk (DLF)	Hohenpeißenberg	0,05
94.7	Klassik Radio	Niebüll Süderlügum	0,2
94.7		Wittlich	0,2
94.7	r,s,2	Frankfurt (Oder)/Booßen	3
94.7	Ostseewelle (West)	Grevesmühlen Hamberge	0,1
94.7	Cityradio Trier	Trierweiler	0,04
94.8	SWR3 (Rheinland-Pfalz/Rheinland)	Linz (Rhein)/Ginsterhahner Kopf	50
94.8	Bayern 1 (Franken)	Bamberg/Geisberg	25
94.8	BBC World Service	Berlin/Schäferberg	4
94.8	Antenne Landau	Landau in der Pfalz	0,1
94.8	Deutschlandfunk Kultur	Aschaffenburg	0,1
94.8	Radio Sauerland	Marsberg	0,1
94.8	radio TOP 40	Jena/Kernberge	0,2
94.8	N-JOY	Hann. Münden/Tannenkamp	0,05
94.8	egoFM	Augsburg/Hotelturm	0,1
94.8		Dalhausen	0,05
94.8	radio TOP 40	Ilmenau	0,1
94.8	N-JOY	Pasewalk	1,3
94.8	Bayern 3	Mittenwald	0,01
94.8	Radio Aktiv	Bad Pyrmont/Hohberg	0,05
94.9	SWR4 Rheinland-Pfalz (Radio Mainz)	Wolfsheim	5
94.9	SWR2 (Baden-Württemberg)	Waldburg	60
94.9	MDR Sachsen-Anhalt (Stendal)	Dequede	10
94.9	Landeswelle Thüringen (Ost)	Ronneburg (Gera)	3
94.9	Radio Herford	Herford/Eggeberg	0,5
94.9		Annweiler	0,01
94.9	Radio Nordseewelle	Jever	0,25
94.9	SWR1 Rheinland-Pfalz	Trier/Markusberg	0,1
94.9	SWR4 Baden-Württemberg (Franken Radio)	Creglingen	0,01
94.9	MDR Aktuell	Meißen	1
94.9	N-JOY	Heide/Welmbüttel	0,8
94.9	SWR3 (Württemberg)	Freudenberg (Main)/Kirschfurt	0,01
94.9		Templin	0,5
94.9	Radio WSW	Wilthen	0,2
95.0	hr-info	Rimberg	50
95.0	Bayern 1 (Niederbayern/Oberpfalz)	Hohe Linie	25
95.0	NDR Info (Niedersachsen/RB 5)	Bremen-Walle	1
95.0	Rockland Sachsen-Anhalt	Bernburg	1
95.0	R.SA (Leipzig)	Wurzen	0,4
95.0		Angermünde	0,8
95.0	Deutschlandfunk Kultur	Lörrach/Tüllingerberg	0,1
95.0	HAMBURG ZWEI	Hamburg/Heinrich-Hertz-Turm	0,3
95.0	Radio Alpenwelle	Bad Tölz/Kalvarienberg	0,2
95.0	ROCK ANTENNE (Freising)	Freising/Thalhauser Forst	0,1
95.0	N-JOY	Barth	0,3
95.0	Kirchenfunk Meppen	Meppen/Propsteikirche	0,01
95.0	R.SA (Dresden)	Niesky	0,2
95.1	WDR 3	Langenberg	100
95.1	SWR1 Baden-Württemberg	Aalen	50
95.1	Radio Eins (RBB) (Cottbus)	Cottbus/Calau	22
95.1	SWR1 Baden-Württemberg	Wannenberg	2,6
95.1	Antenne Frankfurt 95,1	Wiesbaden/Konrad Adenauer Ring	0,5
95.1	Antenne Frankfurt 95,1	Frankfurt (Main) Europaturm	0,2
95.1	MDR Aktuell	Aue (Sachsen)	1
95.1	Radio SAW (Halle)	Naumburg	0,5
95.1	SWR2 (Rheinland-Pfalz)	Idar-Oberstein (Nahetal)	0,01
95.1	SWR2 (Rheinland-Pfalz)	Alf-Bullay	0,01
95.1		Saarburg/Geisberg	0,1
95.1	Radio Westfalica	Rahden	0,1
95.1	NDR Kultur	Goslar-Sudmerberg	0,1
95.1	Radio Euroherz	Marktredwitz	0,1
95.1	extra-radio	Marktredwitz	0,1
95.1	Radio 21 (Ost)	Wolfsburg-Klieversberg	0,1
95.1	SWR1 Baden-Württemberg	Freudenberg (Main)-Rauenberg	0,01
95.1	N-JOY	Demmin	0,1
95.1	MDR Aktuell	Sondershausen	0,09
95.2	MDR Kultur	Sonneberg/Bleßberg	20
95.2	SWR4 Baden-Württemberg (Radio Südbaden)	Rottweil/Rote Steige	2
95.2	M'era Luna FM	Hildesheim/Flugplatz	(1)
95.2	WDR 3	Holzminden Höxter	0,5
95.2	Deutschlandfunk Kultur	Pforzheim-Dillweissenstein	0,5
95.2	MDR Aktuell	Klingenthal/Amtsberg	0,1
95.2	Deutschlandfunk Kultur	Rendsburg	0,25
95.2		Papenburg	0,1
95.2		Bad Fallingbostel	0,05
95.2	Power Radio	Belzig	0,4
95.2	Pfarrradio Warsingsfehn	Moormerland	0,006
95.2	Ems-Vechte-Welle	Nordhorn	0,2
95.2	DRM+ Test	Hannover/Uni	0,1
95.3	YOU FM (hr)	Hardberg	50
95.3	Deutschlandfunk Kultur	Schwerin	100
95.3	MDR Aktuell	Halle/Petersberg	2
95.3	Deutschlandfunk Kultur	Bitburg/Fernmeldeturm	0,1
95.3	Radio Ramasuri	Amberg Hirschau/Rotbühl	1
95.3	Babelsberg Hitradio	Potsdam/Horstweg	0,63
95.3	Radio 21 (Südwest)	Osnabrück/VW-Turm	0,08
95.3	radio TOP 40	Gera/Stadtwald	0,5
95.3	Bayern 3	Landshut-Altdorf	0,25
95.3	NDR Info (Niedersachsen)	Rinteln	0,1
95.3	Power Radio	Fürstenwalde/Rauener Berge	0,1
95.4	SWR2 (Rheinland-Pfalz)	Bad Marienberg	25
95.4	MDR Kultur	Dresden-Wachwitz	100
95.4	SWR1 Baden-Württemberg	Brandenkopf	0,5
95.4	Antenne Münster	Münster/Fernmeldeturm	0,3
95.4	Radio Eins	Lichtenfels	0,3
95.4	Deutschlandfunk (DLF)	Prüm (Schnee-Eifel)	0,05
95.4	BB Radio (Nord-Ost)	Eberswalde	0,8
95.4	Radio IN	Ingolstadt/Bayern-Werk	0,2
95.4		Celle/Hohe Wende	0,2
95.4	bremen zwei	Schiffdorf (Bremerhaven) (nds)	25
95.4	Radyo Metropol FM (Südwest)	Stuttgart-Münster	1
95.4	Vogtland Radio	Plauen/Kemmler	2
95.4	BB Radio (Nord-Ost)	Zehlendorf (Oranienburg)	1,3
95.4	Deutschlandfunk (DLF)	Damme	0,3
95.4		Regen	0,01
95.4	MDR Kultur	Zittau	0,5
95.5	SR 3 Saarlandwelle	Göttelborner Höhe	100
95.5	hr2	Hoher Meißner	100
95.5	BR Klassik	Büttelberg	10
95.5	N-JOY	Garz (Rügen)	10
95.5	SWR3 (Württemberg)	Geislingen/Oberböhringen	0,5
95.5	Radio ZuSa	Lüneburg-Neu Wendhausen	1
95.5	R.SA (Chemnitz)	Zwickau-Planitz	0,5
95.5	95.5 Charivari	München/Olympiaturm	0,32
95.5	Deutschlandfunk (DLF)	Bielefeld/DTAG	0,1
95.5	Deutschlandfunk Kultur	Molbergen-Peheim (Cloppenburg)	0,1
95.5	MDR Thüringen (Gera)	Bad Lobenstein/Sieglitzberg	2
95.5	Deutschlandfunk (DLF)	Regensburg/Ziegetsberg	0,2
95.5	105.9 Radio Paradiso	Eisenhüttenstadt	0,2
95.6	Bayern 1 (Mainfranken)	Pfaffenberg	25
95.6	Neckaralb Live	Balingen-Frommern Laufen	1
95.6	hitradio.rt1 nordschwaben	Hühnerberg	1
95.6	Ems-Vechte-Welle	Lingen-Schepsdorf	0,63
95.6	Radio SAW (Magdeburg/Altmark)	Dequede	1
95.6	r,s,2	Cottbus Klein Oßnig	1,3
95.6	N-JOY	Morsum (Sylt)	5
95.6	Radio Vest	Haltern-Berghaltern	0,1
95.6	BR Klassik	Passau/Kühberg	0,5
95.6	MDR Aktuell	Leipzig/MDR	0,5
95.6	N-JOY	Wedel (Elbe)/Holm	0,2
95.6	Cosmo	Bremen-Walle	0,2
95.6		Pritzwalk Stadt	0,1
95.6	MDR Aktuell	Löbau	2
95.6		Kreuth	0,1
95.6	Radio SRF 3	Konstanz	0,05
95.7	SWR1 Rheinland-Pfalz	Rüdesheim (Bingen)	0,5
95.7		Koblenz/Bendorf (Vierwindenhöhe)	2
95.7	Landeswelle Thüringen (Mitte)	Remda (Saalfeld)	10
95.7	WDR 2 (Wuppertal)	Solingen	1
95.7	WDR 2 (Wuppertal)	Leichlingen-Witzhelden	1
95.7	SWR4 Baden-Württemberg (Baden Radio)	Mühlacker	2
95.7	harmony.fm	Fulda-Künzell/Dicker Turm	0,32
95.7	NDR Kultur	Kronshagen (Kiel)	1
95.7	N-JOY	Sibbesse (Hildesheim)	0,5
95.7	Radio Primaton	Haßfurt (Main)	0,1
95.7	Radio Westfalica	Minden Porta Westfalica	0,5
95.7	Radio AWN	Mallersdorf Hofkirchen	0,1
95.7	Radio SAW (Harz)	Blankenburg	0,1
95.7	Bayern 2 (Südbayern)	Bad Tölz-Gaißach	0,1
95.7	Radio WAF	Beckum/Höxberg	0,25
95.7		Sachrang	0,01
95.7	Radio Charivari Regensburg (Cham)	Bad Kötzting	0,003
95.7	NDR Kultur	Bad Pyrmont/Hamberg	0,05
95.8	WDR 5	Ederkopf	20
95.8	Bayern 3	Grünten	100
95.8	Radio Eins (RBB)	Berliner Fernsehturm	100
95.8	NDR 1 Niedersachsen (Oldenburg)	Aurich	25
95.8	bigFM (Rheinland-Pfalz)	Rivenich	0,17
95.8	egoFM	Würzburg/Frankenwarte, DTAG (1)	0,3
95.8	Radio Chemnitz	Neukirchen (Erzgebirge)	1
95.8	Radio Z	Nürnberg-Schweinau	0,32
95.8	STAR FM 107,8/99,0	Nürnberg-Schweinau	0,32
95.8	Deutschlandfunk (DLF)	Schwäbisch Hall	0,1
95.8		Bad Neustadt (Saale)	0,05
95.8	Deutschlandfunk Kultur	Lauenburg	0,1
95.8	Radio Teddy	Rostock-Toitenwinkel	0,1
95.8		Bischofsreut	0,01
95.9	SWR4 Rheinland-Pfalz (Radio Ludwigshafen)	Weinbiet	25
95.9	WDR 3	Aachen/Stolberg	20
95.9	Bayern 3	Hochberg (Traunstein)	5
95.9	NDR 2 (Niedersachsen)	Visselhövede	5
95.9	N-JOY	Göttingen-Nikolausberg	0,5
95.9	radio corax	Halle/Petersberg	1
95.9	Hit Radio FFH (Osthessen)	Bad Hersfeld	0,1
95.9	hr3	Bad Orb (Spessart)	0,32
95.9	Deutschlandfunk (DLF)	Landshut/Weickmannshöhe	0,2
95.9		Datteln	0,05
95.9	Radio Gütersloh	Gütersloh	0,05
95.9	BR Klassik	Garmisch-Partenk,/Kreuzeck	0,1
95.9	MDR Aktuell	Freital	0,1
95.9	NDR Info (Schleswig-Holstein)	Lübeck/Wallanlagen	0,1
95.9	Triquency	Detmold	0,02
95.9	Deutschlandfunk Kultur	Schwäbisch Gmünd/Vogelhöfe	0,2
95.9		Bad Bentheim	0,1
96.0	Bayern 2 (Nordbayern)	Ochsenkopf	100
96.0	Radyo Metropol FM (Südwest)	Mainz/Bonifaziustürme	0,4
96.0	NDR Kultur	Helpterberg	100
96.0		Butzbach	0,08
96.0	NDR 2 (Niedersachsen)	Holzminden Stahle	0,5
96.0	Radio Ton Heilbronn, Franken (Main-Tauber-Kreis)	Künzelsau-Taläcker	0,1
96.0	WDR Eins Live	Arnsberg/Schloßberg	0,1
96.0	Deutschlandfunk Kultur	Fritzlar	0,1
96.0	WDR 2 (Bielefeld)	Lübbecke/Bohlenstr.	0,1
96.0	NDR Info (Niedersachsen)	Goslar-Sudmerberg	0,1
96.0	SR 3 Saarlandwelle	Mettlach	0,01
96.0	WDR 2 (Münster)	Ibbenbüren-Osterledde	0,5
96.0	Tide 96,0 / Hamburger Lokalradio	Hamburg/Heinrich-Hertz-Turm	0,1
96.0	MDR Aktuell	Bad Langensalza	0,02
96.0	Deutschlandfunk (DLF)	Stuttgart-Münster	0,5
96.0	SWR2 (Baden-Württemberg)	Freiburg-Lehen	1
96.0	NDR 1 Niedersachsen (Oldenburg)	Schiffdorf (Bremerhaven) (nds)	0,1
96.1	SWR1 Rheinland-Pfalz	Koblenz/Waldesch	10
96.1	Bayern 2 (Südbayern)	Hühnerberg	25
96.1	SR 3 Saarlandwelle	Moseltal (Perl)	5
96.1	NDR Kultur	Flensburg-Engelsby	25
96.1	MDR Sachsen-Anhalt (Magdeburg)	Magdeburg/Burg Kapaunberg	10
96.1	WDR 4	Hallenberg	0,1
96.1	Radio Emscher Lippe	Gelsenkirchen	0,1
96.1	NDR 2 (Niedersachsen)	Hann. Münden/Tannenkamp	0,05
96.1	MDR Thüringen (Erfurt)	Roßleben	0,1
96.1	MDR Aktuell	Zeitz	0,1
96.1	Radio Roland	Bremen-Walle	(1)
96.1	Triquency	Lemgo/FH Lippe	0,02
96.1	Bayern 3	Oberammergau/Laber	0,1
96.1	Hit Radio FFH (Südhessen)	Michelstadt	0,1
96.1	N-JOY	Braunlage	0,02
96.1	Radio Seefunk (Bodensee)	Bad Saulgau	0,32
96.1	Deutschlandfunk Kultur	Oschatz/Collmberg	0,32
96.1		Sulingen	0,16
96.2	SWR2 (Baden-Württemberg)	Hornisgrinde	80
96.2	YOU FM (hr)	Eltville (Rheingau)	0,5
96.2	NDR 2 (Niedersachsen)	Hannover Hemmingen	5
96.2	MDR Kultur	Löbau	5
96.2	Radio Sauerland	Olsberg-Antfeld	0,4
96.2	harmony.fm	Marburg/Lahnberge	0,2
96.2	NDR 1 Radio MV (Wismar)	Wismar/Rüggow	0,5
96.2	Radio Zwickau	Zwickau Ebersbrunn	0,3
96.2	NDR 1 Radio MV (Wismar)	Wismar/Werft	0,2
96.2	Deutschlandfunk Kultur	Rosenheim/FMT	0,1
96.2	Radio F.R.E.I.	Erfurt-Hochheim	0,6
96.2	MDR Aktuell	Flöha	0,1
96.3	Bayern 3	Kreuzberg (Rhön)	100
96.3	WDR 3	Bärbelkreuz (Eifel)	10
96.3	Cosmo	Berlin/Scholzplatz	80
96.3	NDR 2 (Schleswig-Holstein)	Heide/Welmbüttel	15
96.3	Deutschlandfunk Kultur	Saarlouis-Steinrausch	0,1
96.3	Deutschlandfunk Kultur	Olpe/Gewerbegebiet Osterseifen	0,1
96.3	Radio WAF	Oelde-Stromberg	0,25
96.3	Radio Gong 96,3	München/Olympiaturm	0,32
96.3	gong fm	Burglengenfeld	0,32
96.3	NDR 1 Radio MV (Vorpommern)	Stralsund	0,08
96.3	Bayern 2 (Südbayern)	Ulm/Kuhberg	0,08
96.4	NDR 2 (Niedersachsen)	Dannenberg/Zernien	25
96.4	NDR Info (Niedersachsen)	Aurich	10
96.4	MDR Kultur	Jena-Oßmaritz	1
96.4	WDR 2 (Bielefeld)	Holzminden Höxter	0,5
96.4	bigFM (Rheinland-Pfalz)	Bad Dürkheim Friedelsheim	0,1
96.4	Radio Seefunk (Bodensee)	Überlingen	1
96.4	SWR1 Rheinland-Pfalz	Kirn	0,01
96.4	STAR FM 107,8/99,0	Fürth	1
96.4	N-JOY	Osnabrück/Schleptruper Egge	0,2
96.4	Deutschlandfunk (DLF)	Nordhausen	0,1
96.4	hitradio.rt1 südschwaben	Babenhausen	0,05
96.4		Grenzach-Wyhlen	0,05
96.4		Stuttgart/Schleyerhalle	0,005
96.4	SWR4 Baden-Württemberg (Schwaben Radio)	Blaubeuren	0,002
96.4	Energy Sachsen (Dresden)	Freiberg/Hauptpostamt	0,5
96.4	Radio Siegen	Burbach	0,1
96.4	Radio Dresden	Pirna/Cottaer Spitzberg	0,1
96.5	SWR3 (Württemberg)	Waldenburg	100
96.5	Deutschlandfunk Kultur	Langenberg	45
96.5	Bayern 2 (Südbayern)	Brotjacklriegel	100
96.5	Deutschlandfunk (DLF)	Helpterberg	10
96.5	bigFM (Rheinland-Pfalz)	Saarburg-Warsberg	0,25
96.5	Radio BOB! (Hessen)	Korbach/An der Strother Str.	0,2
96.5	RundFunk Meissner	Witzenhausen	0,32
96.5	Wartburg Radio 96,5	Eisenach	0,2
96.5	delta radio (Süd)	Ahrensburg	2
96.5	N-JOY	Goslar-Sudmerberg	0,1
96.5	Radio Galaxy Oberfranken	Naila	0,1
96.5	BR Klassik	Weiler (Allgäu)/Simmerberg	0,1
96.5	Deutschlandfunk Kultur	Oberstdorf	0,1
96.5	Deutschlandfunk (DLF)	Pfronten	0,02
96.5		Balderschwang/Kreuzle-Alm	0,02
96.5	NDR Kultur	Alfeld (Leine)	0,05
96.5	Radio Teddy	Arnstadt	0,05
96.6	BFBS Germany	Minden Porta Westfalica	0,03
96.6	Deutschlandfunk (DLF)	Leipzig Wiederau	100
96.6		Adenau	0,63
96.6	Wüste Welle	Tübingen	2
96.6	helle welle	Tübingen	2
96.6	NDR Info (Schleswig-Holstein)	Bungsberg/NDR-Mast	2
96.6	harmony.fm	Kassel/Tannenwäldchen	0,32
96.6	N-JOY	Lingen-Damaschke	0,5
96.6	Deutschlandfunk Kultur	Wörth	0,2
96.6	Radio Bamberg	Forchheim Pinzberg	0,1
96.6	N-JOY	Seesen/Kleiner Schildberg	0,05
96.6	TOP FM	Starnberg/Buchhof	0,32
96.6	SWR4 Baden-Württemberg (Radio Südbaden)	Schliengen	0,1
96.6	Energy Berlin	Wittstock	0,5
96.7	hr2	Großer Feldberg (Taunus)/hr	100
96.7	Bremen NEXT	Bremen-Walle	50
96.7	Deutschlandfunk Kultur	Rostock-Toitenwinkel	40
96.7	hitradio.rt1	Augsburg/Hotelturm	0,3
96.7	Radio France Internationale	Berlin-Schöneberg	0,8
96.7	Bayern 2 (Südbayern)	Bad Reichenhall/Kirchholz-Steilhofweg	0,3
96.7	r.s.2	Finsterwalde Crinitz	1
96.7	RSA Radio (Oberallgäu)	Kempten/Allgäu Tower	0,1
96.7	Deutschlandfunk (DLF)	Esslingen am Neckar-Zollberg	0,1
96.7	Radio Charivari Rosenheim	Rosenheim Dandlberg	0,3
96.7	bigFM (Rheinland-Pfalz)	Pirmasens/Fernmeldeamt	0,4
96.7	Offener Kanal Westküste	Wyk auf Föhr	0,4
96.7	Radio SRF 1 (Ostschweiz)	Konstanz	0,05
96.8	Bayern 1 (Niederbayern/Oberpfalz)	Hoher Bogen	50
96.8	Landeswelle Thüringen (Nord)	Kulpenberg	3
96.8		Eppingen	0,32
96.8	Kulturradio (RBB)	Frankfurt (Oder)/Booßen	5
96.8	bigFM (Saarland)	Friedrichsthal	0,1
96.8	Radio BOB! (Hessen)	Rotenburg an der Fulda	0,32
96.8		Baden-Baden-Lichtental	0,32
96.8	SWR3 (Baden/Kurpfalz)	Hohe Möhr	0,5
96.8	NDR Kultur	Göttingen-Nikolausberg	0,5
96.8	bonn FM	Bonn/Römerstr.	0,5
96.8		Baiersbronn (Oberes Murgtal)	0,1
96.8	NDR Info (Hamburg)	Lauenburg Echem	0,3
96.8	Deutschlandfunk Kultur	München/Blutenburgstr.	0,32
96.8		Recklinghausen/Breite Str.	0,001
96.8		Braunschweig/Drachenberg	0,15
96.8	Motor FM	Baden-Baden/Lichtental	
96.9	MDR JUMP	Sonneberg/Bleßberg	20
96.9	SWR4 Baden-Württemberg (Schwaben Radio)	Aalen	5
96.9	Antenne Kaiserslautern	Kaiserslautern/Dansenberg	0,5
96.9	Deutschlandfunk Kultur	Dequede	10
96.9	Rockland Radio (Koblenz)	Linz (Rhein)-Dattenberg	0,2
96.9	SWR1 Baden-Württemberg	Wertheim/Schloßberg	0,1
96.9	Deutschlandfunk Kultur	Lennestadt-Maumke	0,1
96.9	104.6 RTL	Luckenwalde	1
96.9	Bayern 2 (Südbayern)	Berchtesgaden-Schönau	0,3
96.9	Radio BOB! (Schleswig-Holstein) (Nord/West)	Heide	0,3
96.9	R.SA (Dresden)	Hoyerswerda	0,2
96.9	Deutschlandfunk Kultur	Marktoberdorf	0,1
96.9	Radio Berg	Leverkusen-Opladen	0,5
96.9	MDR JUMP	Seifhennersdorf	0,32
96.9	Radio 7 (Ravensburg)	Ravensburg/Weingarten (Schussental)	0,1
96.9	Deutschlandfunk Kultur	Greifswald	0,1
96.9	Bayern 3	Burgberg/Halden (Sonthofen)	0,01
96.9		Sachrang	0,01
97.0	WDR 3	Teutoburger Wald/Bielstein	100
97.0	SWR4 Baden-Württemberg (Baden Radio)	Ettlingen/Wattkopf	20
97.0	Deutschlandfunk (DLF)	Chemnitz/Geyer	100
97.0	SWR3 (Baden/Kurpfalz)	Blauen	8,4
97.0	BR Klassik	Hohe Linie	5
97.0	BR Klassik	Hochberg (Traunstein)	5
97.0	Radio B2 (Berlin/Brandenburg)	Potsdam/Horstweg	0,63
97.0	Radio BOB! (Schleswig-Holstein) (Mitte)	Kiel/Fernsehturm	0,5
97.0	Radio B2 (Mecklenburg-Vorpommern)	Wismar/Rüggow	0,2
97.0	Radyo Metropol FM (Nordrhein-Westfalen)	Dorsten/RCG Kraftfutterwerk	0,2
97.0	Bayern 2 (Südbayern)	Herzogstand/Fahrenbergkopf (BR)	0,08
97.0	Power Radio	Erkner	0,32
97.0	NDR Kultur	Helgoland	0,05
97.1	Antenne Mainz (Bodenheim)	Bodenheim	0,1
97.1	SWR3 (Alb/Bodensee)	Witthoh (Tuttlingen)	40
97.1	Deutschlandfunk Kultur	Helpterberg	30
97.1	Rockland Radio (Rhein-Neckar)	Kirchheimbolanden	0,2
97.1	WDR 2 (Siegen)	Siegen-Giersberg	0,5
97.1		Würzburg/Frankenwarte, DTAG (1)	0,3
97.1	SWR1 Baden-Württemberg	Weinheim/Hirschkopf	0,04
97.1	Radio Gong 97.1	Nürnberg-Schweinau	0,32
97.1	Radyo Metropol FM (Hessen)	Frankfurt (Main) Raimundstr. 48–54	0,2
97.1	Rockland Sachsen-Anhalt	Köthen	1
97.1	SWR2 (Baden-Württemberg)	Buchen/Walldürner Straße	0,05
97.1	hr4 (Mittelhessen)	Limburg/Schafsberg	0,2
97.1		Bergisch Gladbach	0,05
97.1	hitradio.rt1 nordschwaben	Donauwörth	0,1
97.1	Energy Hamburg	Hamburg/Heinrich-Hertz-Turm	0,3
97.1	Hochschulradio Düsseldorf	Düsseldorf/St. Suitbertus Kirche	0,04
97.1	Deutschlandfunk Kultur	Nordhorn	0,2
97.1	Deutschlandfunk Kultur	Uelzen/Funkturm	0,2
97.1	Bayern 3	Reit im Winkl	0,1
97.1		Saarbrücken/Schwarzenberg	0,1
97.1	Antenne SIBI	Bad Honnef	0,001
97.2	Deutschlandfunk Kultur	Inselsberg	100
97.2	hr-info	Wiesbaden/Zircon Tower	0,1
97.2	bigFM (Baden-Württemberg)	Sinsheim	0,5
97.2	SWR4 Rheinland-Pfalz (Radio Koblenz)	Alf-Bullay	0,05
97.2	Radio MK	Werdohl	0,1
97.2		Remscheid-Hohenhagen	0,1
97.2	Radyo Metropol FM (Bremen)	Bremen-Walle	0,5
97.2	Antenne AC	Simmerath	0,05
97.2	egoFM	Stuttgart-Münster	1
97.2	Radio Russkij	Berlin-Schöneberg	0,16
97.2		Grenzach-Wyhlen	0,05
97.2	Unser Radio Passau	Grafenau	0,1
97.2	Deutschlandfunk (DLF)	Rosenheim/FMT	0,1
97.2		Deggendorf/Aletsberg	0,1
97.2	Klassik Radio	Bungsberg/DTAG-Turm	0,2
97.2	SWR3 (Württemberg)	Creglingen	0,01
97.2	SWR2 (Baden-Württemberg)	Wiesensteig	0,01
97.2	SWR2 (Baden-Württemberg)	Freudenberg (Main)/Kirschfurt	0,01
97.2	Unser Radio Regen	Viechtach/Kronberg-Hütte	0,012
97.2	Antenne Pulheim 97,2	Pulheim/Walzwerk	0,02
97.3	Deutschlandfunk (DLF)	Dresden-Wachwitz	100
97.3	DASDING (SWR)	Tübingen	2
97.3	WDR 3	Kleve/Bresserberg	2
97.3	Bayern 3	Ismaning	25
97.3	Antenne Frankfurt 95,1	Hanau/Fernmeldegebäude	0,5
97.3	Deutschlandfunk Kultur	Ludwigshafen	0,1
97.3	Deutschlandfunk (DLF)	Rostock-Toitenwinkel	5
97.3	SWR4 Rheinland-Pfalz (Radio Trier)	Kreuzweiler	0,3
97.3	Radio Siegen	Bad Laasphe	0,1
97.3	Radio 8	Feuchtwangen Schopfloch	0,3
97.3	Deutschlandfunk Kultur	Heilbronn-Neckargartach	0,1
97.3	Deutschlandfunk Kultur	Wetzlar-Aßlar Klein Altenstädten	0,32
97.3	Deutschlandfunk Kultur	Altenburg	0,4
97.3	N-JOY	Wilhelmshaven	0,3
97.3	Deutschlandfunk (DLF)	Frankfurt (Oder)/Booßen	0,5
97.3	gong fm	Schwandorf	0,1
97.3	WDR 3	Ibbenbüren-Osterledde	0,5
97.3	Radio 21 (Nordost)	Stade	0,19
97.3	Radio Galaxy Oberfranken	Wunsiedel	0,2
97.3	Antenne Bayern	Balderschwang/Gelbhansekopf	0,02
97.4	SWR4 Rheinland-Pfalz (Radio Koblenz)	Linz (Rhein)/Ginsterhahner Kopf	50
97.4	Deutschlandfunk Kultur	Brocken	100
97.4	hr2	Würzberg	5
97.4	SWR3 (Alb/Bodensee)	Ulm/Kuhberg	10
97.4	BR24	Bamberg/Geisberg	5
97.4	Antenne Unna	Lünen/STEAG Kraftwerk	0,5
97.4	N-JOY	Röbel	4
97.4	Radio BOB! (Schleswig-Holstein) (Ost)	Lauenburg	0,32
97.4	Klassik Radio	Kiel/Fernsehturm	0,25
97.4	DASDING (SWR)	Pforzheim-Arlinger	1
97.4	SWR1 Baden-Württemberg	Nagoldtal	0,01
97.5	SWR3 (Rheinland-Pfalz/Rheinland)	Bornberg	25
97.5	MDR Aktuell	Suhl/Erleshügel	5
97.5	Energy Sachsen (Chemnitz)	Chemnitz-Reichenhain	3
97.5	Die Neue 107,7	Esslingen am Neckar-Zollberg	0,5
97.5	Radio Regenbogen (Freiburg)	Freiburg-Littenweiler	1
97.5	WDR 3	Arnsberg/Schloßberg	0,1
97.5	StHörfunk	Schwäbisch Hall	0,1
97.5	SWR3 (Baden/Kurpfalz)	Murgtal	0,05
97.5	Radio Oberland	Hohenpeißenberg	0,1
97.5	Deutschlandfunk Kultur	Itzehoe	0,1
97.5	Deutschlandfunk Kultur	Damme	0,32
97.5	Deutschlandfunk Kultur	Münster/Fernmeldeturm	0,1
97.6	Bayern 3	Gelbelsee	25
97.6	Bayern 3	Würzburg/Frankenwarte, BR	5
97.6	Planet Radio	Limburg-Staffel	0,4
97.6	N-JOY	Visselhövede	30
97.6	WDR 5	Siegen/Kindelsberg	1
97.6	Radio Neandertal	Langenberg	4
97.6	R.SA	Leipzig-Holzhausen	4
97.6	mephisto 97.6	Leipzig-Holzhausen	4
97.6	harmony.fm	Frankfurt (Main) Europaturm	0,1
97.6	Radio WMW	Borken/Bahnhofstr.	1
97.6	SWR4 Baden-Württemberg (Radio Südbaden)	Brandenkopf	0,1
97.6	Energy Stuttgart (Waiblingen)	Schorndorf-Haubersbronn	0,3
97.6	NDR 1 Radio MV (Vorpommern)	Heringsdorf (Usedom)	1
97.6	NDR 1 Radio MV (Neubrandenburg)	Demmin	0,5
97.6	RSA Radio (Oberallgäu)	Kempten/Eschachberg	1
97.6		Dalhausen	0,05
97.6	Radio Bielefeld	Friedrichsdorf	0,4
97.6	radio TOP 40	Saalfeld	0,05
97.6	Offener Kanal Westküste	Garding	0,24
97.6	SWR3 (Württemberg)	Heidenheim a.d Brenz/Schloß Hellenstein	0,01
97.7	SWR1 Rheinland-Pfalz	Haardtkopf	50
97.7	YOU FM (hr)	Rimberg	50
97.7	Deutschlandfunk (DLF)	Berliner Fernsehturm	100
97.7	DASDING (SWR)	Reutlingen	2
97.7	BR Klassik	Coburg/Eckardtsberg	1
97.7	Deutschlandfunk Kultur	Weißwasser	2
97.7	Deutschlandfunk Kultur	Passau/Kühberg	0,5
97.7	Deutschlandfunk (DLF)	Rosenheim Dandlberg	0,16
97.7	Bayern 3	Garmisch-Partenk,/Kreuzeck	0,1
97.7	SWR4 Baden-Württemberg (Schwaben Radio)	Giengen an der Brenz	0,02
97.7	Bayern 3	Bad Tölz-Gaißach	0,1
97.7	Deutschlandfunk Kultur	Lübbecke/Heidbrink	0,2
97.7	Antenne Sylt	Rantum (Sylt)	0,00005
97.7	Radio SRF 2 Kultur	Wangen-Salen/Unterbühlhof	0,1
97.8	SWR1 Baden-Württemberg	Fernsehturm Heidelberg	100
97.8	NDR 2 (Niedersachsen)	Lingen-Damaschke	15
97.8	NDR 1 Welle Nord (Lübeck)	Bungsberg/NDR-Mast	50
97.8	MDR Thüringen (Gera)	Ronneburg (Gera)	10
97.8	Radio Bonn/Rhein-Sieg	Bonn-Venusberg	0,32
97.8	Deutschlandfunk (DLF)	Augsburg Haberskirch	0,5
97.8	Bayern 2 (Südbayern)	Landshut-Altdorf	0,25
97.8	WDR 3	Schmallenberg/Beerenberg	0,1
97.8	MDR Aktuell	Erfurt-Hochheim	1
97.8		Regen	0,01
97.9	Bayern 3	Dillberg	25
97.9	SWR2 (Baden-Württemberg)	Feldberg (Schwarzwald)	5
97.9	YOU FM (hr)	Gießen/DTAG	0,5
97.9	NDR 2 (Niedersachsen)	Cuxhaven/Holter Höhe	10
97.9	Deutschlandfunk (DLF)	Neustrelitz	1
97.9	Deutschlandfunk Kultur	Lüneburg-Neu Wendhausen	0,5
97.9	NDR Info (Niedersachsen)	Bad Rothenfelde	0,5
97.9	hr4 (Mittelhessen)	Weilburg	0,05
97.9	BR Klassik	Tegernseer Tal/Wallberg	0,1
97.9	RSA Radio (Ostallgäu)	Marktoberdorf	0,05
97.9		Hindelang	0,01
97.9	Antenne Thüringen (Mitte)	Weimar-Ehringsdorf	0,3
97.9	SWR2 (Baden-Württemberg)	Blaubeuren	0,002
98.0	Deutschlandfunk (DLF)	Bingen	0,32
98.0	NDR 1 Niedersachsen (Braunschweig)	Torfhaus (Harz-West)	100
98.0	UnserDing (SR)	Bliestal	5
98.0	Antenne Koblenz 98,0	Koblenz-Rauental	0,4
98.0	BR Klassik	Pfaffenberg	2
98.0	Antenne Koblenz 98,0	Neuwied	0,32
98.0	Bayern 1 (Oberbayern)	Hochberg (Traunstein)	5
98.0	Radio PSR (Leipzig)	Oschatz/Collmberg	5
98.0	Antenne Niederrhein	Kleve/Bresserberg	1
98.0	SR 3 Saarlandwelle	Merzig-Hilbringen	0,1
98.0		Frankfurt (Oder)	1
98.0	Ostseewelle (West)	Güstrow	0,4
98.0	SWR2 (Baden-Württemberg)	Bad Wildbad (Enztal)	0,01
98.0	RSA Radio (Ostallgäu)	Füssen-Wasenmoos	0,1
98.1	WDR 3	Nordhelle	35
98.1	SWR3 (Württemberg)	Aalen	50
98.1	NDR 2 (Niedersachsen)	Aurich	25
98.1	RPR1. (Mainz)	Mainz/Bonifaziustürme	0,2
98.1	Deutschlandfunk Kultur	Kaiserslautern/Dansenberg	0,16
98.1	Klassik Radio (Hamburg)	Hamburg/Heinrich-Hertz-Turm	1
98.1	SWR3 (Rheinland-Pfalz/Rheinland)	Idar-Oberstein (Nahetal)	0,01
98.1	Radio Galaxy Oberfranken	Hof Konradsreuth	0,1
98.1	RPR1. (Ludwigshafen)	Bad Dürkheim Friedelsheim	0,05
98.1	NB-Radiotreff 88,0	Greifswald	0,2
98.1	Radio 98eins	Greifswald	0,2
98.1		Berchtesgaden-Schönau	0,1
98.1		Wismar/Rüggow	0,13
98.1	radio hsf (Hochschulfunk)	Ilmenau/Vogelherd	0,3
98.1	Radio BOB! (Schleswig-Holstein) (Nord/West)	Bredstedt/Stollberg	0,05
98.2	SWR1 Rheinland-Pfalz	Bad Kreuznach/Kauzenburg	0,05
98.2	SWR3 (Rheinland-Pfalz/Rheinland)	Diez/Geisenberg (Lahntal)	0,1
98.2	98.2 Radio Paradiso	Berlin/Scholzplatz	8
98.2	MDR Sachsen (Bautzen)	Löbau	5
98.2	Radio Charivari Regensburg (Regensburg)	Regensburg/Ziegetsberg	0,3
98.2	Energy Sachsen (Zwickau)	Zwickau Ebersbrunn	0,3
98.2	WDR 3	Monschau/St. Michael Gymnasium	0,05
98.2	Deutschlandfunk Kultur	Darmstadt-Weiterstadt	0,25
98.2	Deutschlandfunk Kultur	Jena/Kernberge	0,2
98.2	SWR3 (Rheinland-Pfalz/Rheinland)	Trier/Markusberg	0,1
98.2	Radio Osnabrück	Osnabrück-Widukindland/Schinkelturm	0,25
98.2	R.SA (Leipzig)	Leipzig-Neuschönefeld	1
98.2	SR 1 Europawelle	Saarbrücken-Halberg	0,01
98.2		Oberammergau/Laber	0,1
98.2	WDR Eins Live	Warburg/Stapelberg	0,5
98.2	NDR Info (Niedersachsen)	Stadthagen/Bückeberg	1
98.2		Seelow	0,5
98.3	Bayern 1 (Mainfranken)	Kreuzberg (Rhön)	100
98.3	hr1	Wiesbaden/Zircon Tower	0,1
98.3	NDR 2 (Schleswig-Holstein)	Kronshagen (Kiel)	15
98.3	Deutschlandfunk Kultur	Linz (Rhein)-Dattenberg	0,1
98.3	(Lokalradio Heinsberg)	Erkelenz	0,5
98.3	Radio Bielefeld	Bielefeld/DTAG	0,1
98.3	Bayern 3	Bad Reichenhall/Kirchholz-Steilhofweg	0,3
98.3	Energy Sachsen (Dresden)	Döbeln	0,2
98.3	Unser Radio Passau	Passau-Haidenhof	0,2
98.3		Meppen	0,1
98.3	Bayern 3	Augsburg/Hotelturm	0,1
98.3	Antenne MV (Ost)	Waren (Müritz)	0,2
98.3	BR Klassik	Mittenwald	0,01
98.3	Rockland Sachsen-Anhalt	Halle Stadt	0,5
98.3	Antenne Thüringen (Ost)	Gera-Langenberg	0,2
98.3	NDR Info (Niedersachsen)	Schiffdorf (Bremerhaven) (nds)	0,1
98.4	SWR3 (Baden/Kurpfalz)	Hornisgrinde	80
98.4	WDR 3	Siegen-Giersberg	1
98.4	DASDING (SWR)	Nierstein-Oppenheim - Geinsheim	0,25
98.4	Radio SAW (Anhalt)	Wittenberg/Gallunberg	5,2
98.4	NDR Info (Niedersachsen)	Visselhövede	5
98.4	NDR Kultur	Holzminden Stahle	0,5
98.4	radio TOP 40	Altenburg	0,5
98.4	Deutschlandfunk (DLF)	Heringsdorf (Usedom)	0,5
98.4	MDR Kultur	Klingenthal/Aschberg	0,16
98.4	NDR 90,3	Cuxhaven/Holter Höhe	1
98.4	R.SA (Chemnitz)	Flöha	0,1
98.4	Bayern 1 (Franken)	Ludwigsstadt-Ebersdorf	0,05
98.4	Pfarrfunk Breitenberg	Breitenberg	0,006
98.4	coloRadio	Dresden-Gompitz	0,05
98.4	Bayern 3	Ulm/Kuhberg	0,1
98.4	apollo radio	Dresden-Gompitz	0,05
98.5	SWR3 (Rheinland-Pfalz/Rheinland)	Scharteberg (Eifel)	8
98.5	Bayern 3	Wendelstein	100
98.5	NDR 2 (Mecklenburg-Vorpommern)	Schwerin	100
98.5	MDR Thüringen (Heiligenstadt)	Keula	20
98.5	SWR3 (Baden/Kurpfalz)	Wannenberg	2,6
98.5	Radio BOB! (Hessen)	Michelstadt	1
98.5	hr2	Marburg/Spiegelslust	0,32
98.5	Deutschlandfunk (DLF)	Hann. Münden Laubach	0,5
98.5	Radio Bochum	Bochum-Grumme	0,5
98.5	AFN Bavaria-The Eagle	Grafenwöhr/Bleidornturm	1
98.5	Landeswelle Thüringen (Ost)	Bad Lobenstein/Sieglitzberg	2
98.5	NDR Info (Niedersachsen)	Bad Pyrmont/Hamberg	0,05
98.6	WDR 5	Olsberg	10
98.6	Antenne Brandenburg (Cottbus)	Cottbus/Calau	100
98.6	WDR 2 (Köln)	Köln/Kölnturm	0,5
98.6	SR 2 Kulturradio	Homburg	0,2
98.6	MDR Aktuell	Wernigerode	1
98.6	NDR Info (Niedersachsen)	Steinkimmen	3
98.6	98.6 charivari	Nürnberg-Schweinau	0,32
98.6	SWR2 (Baden-Württemberg)	Vaihingen an der Enz	0,1
98.6	Inforadio (RBB)	Prenzlau	0,5
98.6	SR 1 Europawelle	Mettlach	0,01
98.6	apollo radio	Grimma	0,2
98.6	Freies Lokalradio Flensburg	Flensburg/Wassersleben	0,2
98.7	Deutschlandfunk (DLF)	Großer Feldberg (Taunus)/hr	60
98.7	SWR1 Baden-Württemberg	Grünten	50
98.7	NDR Kultur	Hannover Hemmingen	15
98.7		Birkenfeld (Nahe)	0,2
98.7	MDR Kultur	Auerbach/Schöneck	3
98.7	NDR 2 (Schleswig-Holstein)	Morsum (Sylt)	5
98.7	Rockland Sachsen-Anhalt	Magdeburg-Buckau	0,5
98.7	Radio Emscher Lippe	Bottrop	0,5
98.7	N-JOY	Neumünster Armstedt	0,5
98.7		Steinach	0,1
98.7	Deutschlandfunk (DLF)	Saalfeld	0,1
98.7	Unser Radio Deggendorf	Deggendorf Hochoberndorf	0,1
98.7	NB-Radiotreff 88,0	Malchin/Hardtberg	0,1
98.8	SWR1 Baden-Württemberg	Waldenburg	100
98.8	NDR Kultur	Osnabrück/Schleptruper Egge	8
98.8	Radio Brocken (Burgenland)	Naumburg	10
98.8	Radio Charivari Regensburg (Schwandorf)	Burglengenfeld	0,5
98.8	Kiss FM	Berliner Fernsehturm	1
98.8	Deutschlandfunk (DLF)	Suhl/Erleshügel	0,1
98.8	Offener Kanal Lübeck	Lübeck-Stockelsdorf	0,5
98.8	SWR4 Rheinland-Pfalz (Radio Trier)	Trier/Markusberg	0,1
98.8	Radio Bamberg	Ebermannstadt	0,05
98.8	MDR JUMP	Bautzen	0,2
98.8	SWR2 (Baden-Württemberg)	Schramberg/Schloßberg	0,01
98.8	Offener Kanal Westküste	Husum	0,045
98.9	Antenne Koblenz 98,0	Koblenz/Bendorf (Vierwindenhöhe)	0,63
98.9	MDR JUMP	Dequede	10
98.9	DASDING (SWR)	Ulm/Kuhberg	1
98.9	SWR2 (Baden-Württemberg)	Baden-Baden/Merkur	0,8
98.9	Radio Siegen	Neunkirchen/Hellerberg	0,1
98.9	Deutschlandfunk Kultur	Bonn-Venusberg	0,1
98.9	SWR3 (Rheinland-Pfalz/Rheinland)	Bleialf	0,1
98.9	Radyo Metropol FM (Nordrhein-Westfalen)	Lennestadt-Maumke	0,1
98.9	AFN Bavaria-The Eagle	Bamberg	0,1
98.9	Radio Galaxy Oberfranken	Kulmbach/Rehberg	0,1
98.9	radio TOP 40	Pössneck	0,2
98.9	Cosmo	Schiffdorf (Bremerhaven) (nds)	0,5
98.9	Radio B2 (Mecklenburg-Vorpommern)	Stralsund	0,4
98.9	MDR Kultur	Oschatz/Collmberg	0,5
98.9		Kreuth	0,1
99.0	hr1	Hoher Meißner	100
99.0	bigFM (Baden-Württemberg)	Rottweil/Rote Steige	0,5
99.0	Radio Charivari Würzburg	Marktheidenfeld	0,1
99.0	Antenne Bayern	Lindau/Hoyerberg	0,5
99.0	STAR FM 107,8/99,0	Lauf an der Pegnitz	0,2
99.0	Neckaralb Live	Bad Urach (Ermstal)	0,1
99.0	N-JOY	Bungsberg/NDR-Mast	1
99.0		Saarlouis/Choisyring	0,5
99.0	NDR Info (Niedersachsen)	Meppen	0,05
99.0	Radio Chemnitz	Flöha	0,1
99.0	SWR1 Baden-Württemberg	Ravensburg/Weingarten (Schussental)	0,1
99.0	Power Radio	Buckow	0,4
99.1	SWR1 Rheinland-Pfalz	Donnersberg	60
99.1	NDR 2 (Mecklenburg-Vorpommern)	Helpterberg	100
99.1	MDR Sachsen (Chemnitz)	Freiberg/Hauptpostamt	1
99.1	Hochschulradio Aachen	Aachen/Uni-Türme	0,1
99.1	Power Radio	Erkner	0,5
99.1	SWR1 Baden-Württemberg	Unterhausen	0,1
99.1	WDR 2 (Bielefeld)	Bad Oeynhausen/Wittekindsberg	0,1
99.1	Radio IN	Eichstätt/Wintershof	0,1
99.1	Radio 21 (Nordwest)	Wilhelmshaven	0,25
99.1	MDR Aktuell	Haldensleben	1
99.1	SWR2 (Baden-Württemberg)	Heidenheim a.d Brenz/Schloß Hellenstein	0,01
99.1	Radio Brocken (Burgenland)	Zeitz	0,5
99.1		Lübben	0,16
99.1	Radio SRF 2 Kultur	Ermatingen (Reichenau)/Oberzell	0,05
99.2	WDR 2 (Rhein-Ruhr)	Langenberg	100
99.2	NDR Kultur	Hamburg-Moorfleet	80
99.2	SWR1 Rheinland-Pfalz	Saarburg/Geisberg	5
99.2	Bayern 3	Hohenpeißenberg	25
99.2	Bayern 3	Coburg/Eckardtsberg	5
99.2	domradio	Fulda-Künzell/Dicker Turm	0,32
99.2	Freies Radio für Stuttgart	Stuttgart-Münster	0,3
99.2	Energy Stuttgart (Böblingen)	Herrenberg	0,2
99.2	SWR3 (Baden/Kurpfalz)	Freiburg-Lehen	0,5
99.2	hr-info	Limburg/Schafsberg	0,32
99.2		Baiersbronn (Oberes Murgtal)	0,1
99.2	SWR4 Baden-Württemberg (Radio Südbaden)	Oberes Kinzigtal	0,1
99.2	hr-info	Gießen/DTAG	0,2
99.2	MDR Aktuell	Magdala	0,05
99.2	Radio Erzgebirge	Stollberg	0,1
99.2	Hitradio Ohr	Oberkirch Lautenbach	0,1
99.2		Hindelang	0,01
99.2	Radio Teddy	Erfurt-Hochheim	0,5
99.2	Radio BLAU	Leipzig-Connewitz	0,5
99.2	apollo radio	Leipzig-Connewitz	0,5
99.3	Bayern 3	Büttelberg	25
99.3	Radio Eins (RBB)	Belzig	30
99.3	Radio Seefunk (Bodensee)	Friedrichshafen	5
99.3	Classic Rock Radio	Neunkirchen (Saar)/Koßmannstr	1
99.3	SWR3 (Baden/Kurpfalz)	Pforzheim/Wartberg	0,5
99.3	harmony.fm	Offenbach (Main)	0,25
99.3	Radio Aktiv	Hameln-Klüt	0,3
99.3	Ems-Vechte-Welle	Molbergen-Peheim (Cloppenburg)	1
99.3	Radio BOB! (Hessen)	Homberg (Efze)	0,1
99.3	N-JOY	Nienburg/Postmast	0,25
99.3	Antenne Bayern	Landshut/Klausenberg	0,2
99.3	coloRadio	Freital	0,1
99.3	Bayern 3	Burgsinn	0,01
99.3	apollo radio	Freital	0,1
99.3	99drei Radio Mittweida	Mittweida	0,05
99.3	SWR3 (Württemberg)	Wiesensteig	0,01
99.3		Riedlingen	0,01
99.3	Radio Teddy	Gotha/Seeberg	0,2
99.3	Radio Teddy	Frankfurt (Oder)/Booßen	0,8
99.3	Radio Hockenheimring	Hockenheimring	0,001
99.4	SWR2 (Rheinland-Pfalz)	Rüdesheim (Bingen)	0,1
99.4	Bayern 3	Ochsenkopf	100
99.4	DASDING (SWR)	Koblenz/Waldesch	0,2
99.4	NDR Kultur	Heide/Welmbüttel	15
99.4	SWR3 (Rheinland-Pfalz/Rheinland)	Altenahr (Oberes Ahrtal)	0,1
99.4	YOU FM (hr)	Gelnhausen-Höchst	0,32
99.4	Radio Primavera	Miltenberg-Wenschdorf	0,05
99.4	WDR 2 (Siegen)	Arnsberg/Schloßberg	0,1
99.4	Bayernwelle Südost (Traunstein)	Traunstein	0,3
99.4	ROCK ANTENNE (ED/FS/M)	Moosinning	0,5
99.4	RundFunk Meissner	Sontra	0,05
99.4	Deutschlandfunk Kultur	Bad Düben	0,2
99.4	Antenne Brandenburg (Prenzlau)	Prenzlau	0,5
99.4	Bayern 3	Weiler (Allgäu)/Simmerberg	0,1
99.4	Radio SAW (Halle)	Sangerhausen	0,1
99.4	N-JOY	Marlow	0,3
99.4	N-JOY	Ribnitz	0,3
99.4		Garmisch-Partenk,/Kreuzeck	0,05
99.4	Deutschlandfunk Kultur	Tübingen	1
99.4	Triquency	Höxter	0,02
99.4	Bayern 3	Balderschwang/Kreuzle-Alm	0,02
99.4	NDR Info (Niedersachsen)	Bad Bentheim	0,05
99.5	Bayern 3	Hühnerberg	25
99.5	SWR4 Baden-Württemberg (Franken Radio)	Heilbronn/Weinsberg	2
99.5	bigFM (Saarland)	Saarlouis-Steinrausch	1
99.5	Deutschlandfunk (DLF)	Löbau	5
99.5	Radio BOB! (Hessen)	Dieburg	0,2
99.5	bigFM (Baden-Württemberg)	Villingen-Schwenningen/Marbach	1
99.5	NDR Info (Niedersachsen)	Torfhaus (Harz-West)	50
99.5	N-JOY	Schwerin	2
99.5	SWR3 (Baden/Kurpfalz)	Weinheim/Hirschkopf	0,04
99.5	Antenne Thüringen (Süd)	Meiningen/Donopskuppe	0,2
99.5	SWR1 Rheinland-Pfalz	Alf-Bullay	0,01
99.5	Radio MK	Plettenberg	0,05
99.5	SWR4 Baden-Württemberg (Radio Tübingen)	Eyachtal (Albstadt-Ebingen)	0,1
99.5	Radio Teddy	Apolda	0,2
99.5	WDR 4	Ibbenbüren-Osterledde	0,5
99.5	MDR Aktuell	Zschopau	0,25
99.5	Radio Leipzig	Borna	0,1
99.5	SWR3 (Alb/Bodensee)	Nagoldtal	0,01
99.5	Radio Nordseewelle	Aurich	1
99.5		Bischofsreut	0,01
99.6	hr-info	Sackpfeife (Biedenkopf)	100
99.6	Bayern 3	Hohe Linie	25
99.6	SWR4 Rheinland-Pfalz (Radio Kaiserslautern)	Bornberg	0,5
99.6	SWR1 Baden-Württemberg	Stuttgart/SWR-Funkhaus	0,5
99.6	SWR3 (Baden/Kurpfalz)	Baden-Baden/Merkur	0,4
99.6	MDR Kultur	Döbeln	1
99.6	Rockland Sachsen-Anhalt	Naumburg	1,6
99.6	WDR 4	Lübbecke/Bohlenstr.	0,1
99.6	BR Klassik	Berchtesgaden-Schönau	0,3
99.6	N-JOY	Stade	0,2
99.6	Radio Saarbrücken	Saarbrücken/Winterberg	0,13
99.6	Radio Saarbrücken	Saarbrücken/Schwarzenberg	0,1
99.6	R.SA (Leipzig)	Beilrode Arzberg	1
99.6	SACHSENRING	Hohenstein-Ernstthal	0,032
99.6		Sachrang	0,01
99.7	SWR3 (Württemberg)	Bad Mergentheim-Löffelstelzen	10
99.7	Antenne Brandenburg (Potsdam)	Berliner Fernsehturm	100
99.7	YOU FM (hr)	Wiesbaden/Zircon Tower	0,2
99.7	WDR 5	Kleve/Bresserberg	2
99.7	SWR3 (Baden/Kurpfalz)	Brandenkopf	0,5
99.7	RundFunk Meissner	Eschwege	0,5
99.7	SWR2 (Rheinland-Pfalz)	Bleialf	0,1
99.7	Landeswelle Thüringen (West)	Erfurt-Haarberg	0,5
99.7	N-JOY	Holzminden Stahle	0,5
99.7	bigFM (Baden-Württemberg)	Ulm-Ermingen	1
99.7	NDR Info (Schleswig-Holstein)	Kronshagen (Kiel)	1
99.7	Radio Euskirchen	Euskirchen/Erlenhof	0,1
99.7	Radio Berg	Köln-Gremberg	0,5
99.7	WDR Eins Live	Monschau/St. Michael Gymnasium	0,05
99.7	Radio 21 (Nordost)	Uelzen/Funkturm	0,2
99.7	Bayern 3	Tegernseer Tal/Wallberg	0,1
99.7	R.SA (Chemnitz)	Elsterberg	0,2
99.8	NDR 2 (Niedersachsen)	Steinkimmen	100
99.8	Bayern 3	Bamberg/Geisberg	25
99.8	Deutschlandfunk (DLF)	Koblenz/Bendorf (Vierwindenhöhe)	0,5
99.8	Planet Radio	Bad Camberg	0,2
99.8	WDR 2 (Wuppertal)	Wuppertal/Wasserturm Atadösken	1
99.8	Energy Sachsen (Leipzig)	Leipzig-Holzhausen	4
99.8	NDR 2 (Mecklenburg-Vorpommern)	Garz (Rügen)	10
99.8	Radio BOB! (Hessen)	Bad Hersfeld	0,2
99.8	Deutschlandfunk Kultur	Heusenstamm	0,2
99.8		Landsberg am Lech	0,5
99.8	N-JOY	Lauenburg Echem	0,3
99.8	Radio Galaxy Landshut	Landshut/Weickmannshöhe	0,2
99.8	Deutschlandfunk (DLF)	Göppingen Weilheim	0,1
99.9	SWR3 (Baden/Kurpfalz)	Fernsehturm Heidelberg	100
99.9	NDR Info (Niedersachsen)	Göttingen-Nikolausberg	5
99.9	Radio Eins (RBB)	Pritzwalk	10
99.9	Planet Radio	Fulda-Künzell/Dicker Turm	0,2
99.9	Inforadio (RBB)	Cottbus Klein Oßnig	1
99.9	Radio Brocken (Harz)	Blankenburg	0,25
99.9	MDR Aktuell	Sangerhausen	1
99.9	Radio Ramasuri	Weiden	0,2
99.9	Deutschlandfunk (DLF)	Ilmenau	0,1
99.9	BR Klassik	Burgsinn	0,01
99.9	Radio Bonn/Rhein-Sieg	Bonn/Ölberg	0,5
99.9	Radio Alpenwelle	Herzogstand/Fahrenbergkopf (MB)	0,1
100.0	Hit Radio FFH (Mittelhessen)	Dillenburg/Angelburg	32
100.0	Radio PSR (Chemnitz)	Chemnitz/Geyer	100
100.0	Radio Salü	Bliestal	5
100.0	WDR 4	Münster/Baumberge	25
100.0	Radio Aktiv	Hameln-Klüt	0,3
100.0	MDR Aktuell	Eisenach	0,2
100.0	Radio Hannover	Hannover/Telemax	0,3
100.0	MDR Aktuell	Schmalkalden	0,1
100.0	Kölncampus	Köln/Sternengasse	0,09
100.0	Deutschlandfunk Kultur	Augsburg/Staufersberg	15
100.0	Ostseewelle (Ost)	Wolgast	0,5
100.0	R.SH (Hamburg)	Hamburg/Heinrich-Hertz-Turm	1
100.0	R.SA (Dresden)	Zittau	0,5
100.0	R.SA (Dresden)	Rothenburg (Oberlausitz)	0,2
100.0	R.SH (Heide)	Helgoland	0,05
100.1	RPR1. (Trier)	Haardtkopf	50
100.1	Antenne 1 (Heilbronn)	Langenburg	50
100.1	Deutschlandfunk (DLF)	Brotjacklriegel	100
100.1	Radio SAW (Magdeburg/Altmark)	Magdeburg/Frohser Berg	20
100.1	Antenne AC	Aachen/Karlshöhe	1
100.1	Freies Radio Freudenstadt	Glatten	1
100.1	Fritz (RBB)	Casekow	50
100.1	Radio Seefunk (Bodensee)	Pfullendorf	1
100.1	Radio Nordseewelle	Neuharlingersiel	1
100.1	YOU FM (hr)	Kassel-Wilhelmshöhe	0,5
100.1	N-JOY	Lüneburg-Neu Wendhausen	0,1
100.1	r.s.2	Lübben	3
100.1		Bad Fallingbostel	0,05
100.1	WDR Eins Live	Schmallenberg/Beerenberg	0,1
100.1		Damme	0,5
100.1	MDR Thüringen (Heiligenstadt)	Sondershausen	0,05
100.2	AFN Kaiserslautern-The Eagle	Kaiserslautern-Vogelweh	7,1
100.2	Deutschlandfunk (DLF)	Kaiserslautern-Vogelweh	5
100.2	Planet Radio	Frankfurt (Main) Europaturm	1
100.2	Antenne Bayern	Gelbelsee	25
100.2	R.SH (Lübeck)	Bungsberg/DTAG-Turm	50
100.2	Antenne Thüringen (Mitte)	Erfurt-Haarberg	3
100.2	Kulturradio (RBB)	Belzig	10
100.2	Radio MK	Lüdenscheid/Hohe Steinert	0,5
100.2	Energy Sachsen (Dresden)	Dresden-Wachwitz	5
100.2	SWR4 Baden-Württemberg (Radio Südbaden)	Hohe Möhr	0,5
100.2	Deutschlandfunk Kultur	Siegen-Fischbacherberg	0,05
100.2	NDR Info (Niedersachsen)	Papenburg	0,5
100.2	Deutschlandfunk (DLF)	Jarmen	0,2
100.2	RSA Radio (Oberallgäu)	Hindelang	0,05
100.2	Deutschlandfunk (DLF)	Eisenhüttenstadt	1
100.3	Planet Radio	Eisenberg (Neuenstein)	50
100.3	Deutschlandfunk (DLF)	Ochsenkopf	100
100.3	RPR1. (Mainz)	Idar-Oberstein Hillschied	1
100.3	Radio Salü	Moseltal (Perl)	5
100.3	bigFM (Baden-Württemberg)	Geislingen-Stötten	5
100.3	Deutschlandfunk (DLF)	Högl	15
100.3	Radio 38 (BS)	Braunschweig/Drachenberg	15
100.3	Deutschlandfunk Kultur	Bremen-Walle	1
100.3	Bayern 2 (Südbayern)	Weiler (Allgäu)/Simmerberg	0,1
100.3	Deutschlandfunk (DLF)	Barth	0,13
100.3	Syltfunk - Söl'ring Radio	Niebüll Süderlügum	2
100.3	Bayern 2 (Südbayern)	Balderschwang/Kreuzle-Alm	0,02
100.3	Deutschlandfunk (DLF)	Würzburg/Frankenwarte, DTAG (1)	0,1
100.4	WDR 2 (Köln)	Bonn-Venusberg	50
100.4	Radio Regenbogen (Karlsruhe)	Hornisgrinde	80
100.4	BR Klassik	Hohenpeißenberg	25
100.4	harmony.fm	Bad Nauheim-Schwalheim	1
100.4	Radio Primavera	Aschaffenburg	1
100.4	MDR Sachsen (Bautzen/Sorbisches Prog.)	Hoyerswerda	30
100.4	bigFM (Rheinland-Pfalz)	Diez/Diezer Hain (Lahntal)	0,1
100.4	Deutschlandfunk Kultur	Leipzig-Holzhausen	2
100.4	NDR Info (Mecklenburg-Vorpommern)	Röbel	4
100.4	delta radio (Nord/West)	Heide/Welmbüttel	15
100.4	Radio ENNO	Nordhausen	0,1
100.4	BR24	Lindau/Hoyerberg	0,1
100.5	WDR 4	Teutoburger Wald/Bielstein	100
100.5	Rock Antenne	Wetzlar-Aßlar Klein Altenstädten	0,32
100.5	Radio Primaton	Schweinfurt-Hochfeld	0,5
100.5	Deutschlandfunk (DLF)	Biberach an der Riß	0,5
100.5		Tauberbischofsheim/Hamberg	0,1
100.5	NDR Info (Mecklenburg-Vorpommern)	Heringsdorf (Usedom)	1
100.5	Vogtland Radio	Reichenbach Netzschkau	1
100.5	Deutschlandfunk Kultur	Landshut/Weickmannshöhe	0,16
100.5	DASDING (SWR)	Bad Mergentheim-Löffelstelzen	0,04
100.5	MDR Kultur	Camburg	0,2
100.5	bigFM (Rheinland-Pfalz)	Bernkastel-Kues	0,1
100.5		Oberemmel	0,2
100.5	Radio Artern	Artern/Solsteg 1	0,01
100.5	Deutschlandfunk (DLF)	Michelstadt	0,2
100.5	Radio SAW (Magdeburg/Altmark)	Stendal	0,5
100.5	R.SA (Leipzig)	Leisnig	0,2
100.5	Radio Argovia	Eggberg	0,5
100.6	RPR1. (Mainz)	Ober-Olm	20
100.6	Deutschlandfunk (DLF)	Witthoh (Tuttlingen)	40
100.6	Antenne Bayern	Dillberg	25
100.6	radio ffn (Hamburg)	Rosengarten-Langenrehm	20
100.6	FluxFM 100,6	Berliner Fernsehturm	13
100.6	Welle Niederrhein (Viersen)	Viersen/Süchtelner Höhen	1
100.6	Classic Rock Radio	St. Ingbert/Oststr.	0,1
100.6	Deutschlandfunk (DLF)	Eschwege	0,5
100.6	DASDING (SWR)	Buchen/Walldürner Straße	0,1
100.6		Dorsten/RCG Kraftfutterwerk	0,2
100.6	Radio 21 (Nordwest)	Aurich-Haxtum	1
100.6		Garz (Rügen)	0,5
100.6		Künzelsau/Katzensteige	0,02
100.6	Radio Charivari Rosenheim	Wasserburg	0,05
100.6	MDR Aktuell	Grimma	0,2
100.7	WDR 4	Ederkopf	15
100.7	Energy Stuttgart (Ludwigsburg)	Güglingen	20
100.7	MDR Kultur	Remda (Saalfeld)	60
100.7	MDR Sputnik	Klötze	5
100.7	SWR4 Baden-Württemberg (Kurpfalz Radio)	Weinheim/Hirschkopf	0,1
100.7	radio ffn (Göttingen)	Hann. Münden Laubach	0,5
100.7	Deutschlandfunk Kultur	Meppen	0,32
100.7	Deutschlandfunk Kultur	Freiberg Niederschöna	1
100.7	SWR4 Baden-Württemberg (Radio Südbaden)	Vogtsburg/Totenkopf (Freiburg)	1
100.7	NDR 1 Radio MV (Wismar)	Grevesmühlen Hamberge	0,5
100.7	BR Klassik	Bad Tölz-Gaißach	0,1
100.8	WDR 2 (Aachen)	Aachen/Stolberg	20
100.8	SWR1 Rheinland-Pfalz	Kettrichhof	5
100.8	NDR 1 Niedersachsen (Hannover)	Stadthagen/Bückeberg	25
100.8	MDR Sachsen-Anhalt (Halle)	Halle/Petersberg	10
100.8	Deutschlandfunk (DLF)	Mayen	0,2
100.8	hr2	Limburg-Staffel	0,32
100.8	Antenne MV (Nord)	Rostock-Toitenwinkel	130
100.8	Antenne Frankfurt 95,1	Darmstadt/Office Tower	0,5
100.8	Radio Galaxy Aschaffenburg	Miltenberg/Fährweg	0,05
100.8	Radio 8	Burgbernheim	0,1
100.8	egoFM	München/Blutenburgstr.	0,3
100.8	Deutschlandfunk Kultur	Heidenheim a.d Brenz/Schmittenberg	0,1
100.8	Bremen Vier	Schiffdorf (Bremerhaven) (nds)	25
100.8	Klassik Radio	Schleswig	0,8
100.9	Hit Radio FFH (Osthessen)	Heidelstein (Rhön)	50
100.9	BR Klassik	Brotjacklriegel	100
100.9	MDR JUMP	Ronneburg (Gera)	30
100.9	Classic Rock Radio	Lebach/Hoxberg	1
100.9	Hellweg Radio	Soest/Möhnesee-Körbecke	1
100.9	Neckaralb Live	Tübingen	1
100.9	Die neue Welle (Baden-Baden)	Baden-Baden/Merkur	0,8
100.9	Berliner Rundfunk 91,4 (Uckermark)	Casekow	5
100.9	Antenne Brandenburg (Cottbus)	Guben	6,3
100.9	Antenne Niedersachsen (Braunschweig)	Seesen/Großer Schildberg	0,5
100.9		Eberbach/Ohrsberg	0,04
100.9	SWR4 Baden-Württemberg (Schwaben Radio)	Schwäbisch Gmünd-Straßdorf	0,1
100.9	Energy Hamburg	Hamburg-Bergedorf	0,1
101.0	WDR 2 (Aachen)	Bärbelkreuz (Eifel)	20
101.0	BR Klassik	Grünten	100
101.0	Radio Brocken (Altmark+Salzwedel)	Dequede	100
101.0	Radio PSR (Dresden)	Löbau	30
101.0	Planet Radio	Marburg/Lahnberge	0,2
101.0		Öhringen	0,1
101.0	Deutschlandfunk (DLF)	Göttingen/Bovenden	0,1
101.0	Deutschlandfunk Kultur	Husum	0,1
101.0	NDR 1 Radio MV (Vorpommern)	Greifswald	0,16
101.0	R.SA (Chemnitz)	Olbernhau	0,5
101.0	Radio Lippe	Schieder-Schwalenberg/Dohlenberg	0,5
101.1	SWR3 (Rheinland-Pfalz/Rheinland)	Donnersberg	60
101.1	Antenne Bayern	Bamberg Buttenheim/Kälberberg	25
101.1	Radio Regenbogen (Freiburg)	Blauen	8,4
101.1	Radio BOB! (Schleswig-Holstein) (Hamburg)	Kaltenkirchen	20
101.1	Deutschlandfunk Kultur	Torgau Belgern	1
101.1	Antenne Bayern	Tegernseer Tal/Ringberg	0,5
101.1	MDR Sachsen-Anhalt (Halle)	Sangerhausen	0,1
101.1	MDR Thüringen (Gera)	Camburg	0,1
101.1	Deutschlandfunk Kultur	Tecklenburg	0,5
101.1	WDR 4	Schmallenberg/Beerenberg	0,1
101.1	Radio B2 (Berlin/Brandenburg)	Fürstenwalde/Rauener Berge	0,5
101.2	SWR4 Rheinland-Pfalz (Radio Trier)	Saarburg/Geisberg	10
101.2	Bremen Vier	Bremen-Walle	100
101.2	hr3	Habichtswald	20
101.2	MDR JUMP	Auerbach/Schöneck	30
101.2	RPR1. (Koblenz)	Diez/Diezer Hain (Lahntal)	0,1
101.2	WDR 4	Siegen-Giersberg	0,5
101.2	SWR4 Baden-Württemberg (Franken Radio)	Wertheim/Schloßberg	0,1
101.2	Radio 7 (Tuttlingen)	Villingen-Schwenningen/Haslach	0,1
101.2	Radio IN (Radio ND1)	Neuburg an der Donau	0,2
101.2	SWR4 Baden-Württemberg (Bodensee Radio)	Sigmaringen/Talwiese	0,1
101.2		Oberammergau	0,1
101.2		Bad Mergentheim/Drillberg	0,01
101.2	Kiel FM	Kiel/Fernsehturm	0,08
101.3	WDR 4	Langenberg	100
101.3	Antenne 1 (Mittlerer Neckar)	Stuttgarter Fernmeldeturm	75
101.3	Antenne MV (West)	Schwerin	100
101.3	harmony.fm	Wetzlar-Aßlar Klein Altenstädten	0,32
101.3		Suhl/Erleshügel	5
101.3	radio TOP 40	Suhl/Erleshügel	1
101.3	Klassik Radio (Berlin)	Berliner Fernsehturm	4
101.3	Radio BOB! (Hessen)	Schlüchtern/Landrücken	0,2
101.3	Deutschlandfunk Kultur	Döbeln	1
101.3	Antenne Bayern	München/Olympiaturm	0,32
101.3	Deutschlandfunk Kultur	Hohe Linie	0,2
101.3	Radio Nordseewelle	Borkum	0,1
101.3	Deutschlandfunk Kultur	Würzburg/Frankenwarte, DTAG (1)	0,1
101.4	Radio SAW (Brocken)	Brocken	100
101.4	Radio BOB! (Hessen)	Wiesbaden/Konrad Adenauer Ring	0,5
101.4	Radio BOB! (Hessen)	Frankfurt (Main) Europaturm	0,2
101.4	R.SH (Flensburg)	Flensburg Freienwill	20
101.4	Deutschlandfunk Kultur	Sassnitz (Rügen)	8
101.4	Radio Oberland	Penzberg Sindelsdorf	0,3
101.4		Grafenwöhr	0,25
101.4	Radio Oberland	Penzberg	0,1
101.4	Deutschlandfunk Kultur	Cham	0,1
101.5	RPR1. (Koblenz)	Koblenz/Kühkopf	40
101.5	Antenne Bayern	Burgbernheim	25
101.5	radio ffn (Emsland)	Lingen-Damaschke	15
101.5	R.SH (Lübeck)	Lübeck Berkenthin	20
101.5	Fritz (RBB)	Frankfurt (Oder)/Booßen	30
101.5	Radio Primaton	Bad Neustadt (Saale)/Heidelberg	1
101.5	MDR Aktuell	Altenburg	1
101.5	Bayernwelle Südost (Traunstein)	Trostberg	0,32
101.5	Radio Euroherz	Naila	0,05
101.5	Unser Radio Passau	Freyung	0,1
101.5	extra-radio	Naila	0,05
101.5	Radio BOB! (Hessen)	Alsfeld	0,32
101.5	NDR Info (Mecklenburg-Vorpommern)	Demmin	0,1
101.6	hr4 (Rhein-Main)	Hardberg	50
101.6	MDR JUMP	Wittenberg/Gallunberg	100
101.6	Bayern 1 (Oberbayern)	Gelbelsee	25
101.6	Radio Plassenburg	Kulmbach/Rehberg	5
101.6	Hitradio Ohr	Brandenkopf	0,5
101.6	Deutschlandfunk (DLF)	Cuxhaven Otterndorf	2
101.6	BFBS Germany	Herford/Eggeberg	1,4
101.6	MDR Aktuell	Pössneck	0,2
101.6	Antenne Bayern	Reit im Winkl	0,1
101.6	Energy Hamburg	Wedel (Elbe)	0,1
101.6		Dannenberg Gusborn	0,1
101.6	Radio BOB! (Schleswig-Holstein) (Nord/West)	Helgoland	0,16
101.7	Radio Salü	Saarbrücken/Schoksberg	100
101.7	hr4 (Nord-Osthessen)	Hoher Meißner	100
101.7	WDR 4	Kleve/Bresserberg	2
101.7	radio ffn (Heide)	Visselhövede	10
101.7		Lohr am Main Gemünden	0,5
101.7	Deutschlandfunk (DLF)	München/Blutenburgstr.	0,3
101.7	domradio	Köln/Sternengasse	0,03
101.7	MDR Aktuell	Eisenberg	1
101.7	Deutschlandfunk Kultur	Garding	0,5
101.7	MDR Aktuell	Auerbach (Vogtland)	0,4
101.8	harmony.fm	Bingen	0,32
101.8	Die neue Welle (Karlsruhe)	Karlsruhe-Grünwettersbach	25
101.8	WDR 2 (Siegen)	Ederkopf	15
101.8	Deutschlandfunk (DLF)	Aurich	100
101.8	NDR Info (Mecklenburg-Vorpommern)	Helpterberg	100
101.8	Radio 7 (Ulm)	Ulm-Ermingen	10
101.8	Radio Seefunk (Bodensee)	Konstanz	10
101.8	MDR Sachsen (Leipzig)	Oschatz/Collmberg	5
101.8	Deutschlandfunk Kultur	Oberursel	0,1
101.8	MDR Aktuell	Bad Lobenstein/Geiersberg	0,5
101.8		Kirchheim (Teck)	0,1
101.8	SWR4 Baden-Württemberg (Radio Südbaden)	Elzach Elztal	0,1
101.8	Energy Stuttgart (Waiblingen)	Backnang	1
101.8	BR24	Tegernseer Tal/Wallberg	0,1
101.8	Deutschlandfunk (DLF)	Osnabrück-Widukindland/Schinkelturm	0,5
101.9	Antenne Bayern	Heidelstein (Rhön)	100
101.9	WDR 5	Aachen/Stolberg	20
101.9	Antenne Bayern	Hoher Bogen	50
101.9	bigFM (Rheinland-Pfalz)	Idar-Oberstein Hillschied	1
101.9	Deutschlandfunk (DLF)	Bungsberg/DTAG-Turm	100
101.9	radio ffn (Hannover)	Barsinghausen	25
101.9		Wulfen	7,2
101.9	MDR JUMP	Jena-Oßmaritz	1
101.9		Landstuhl-Bann (Ramstein)	0,05
101.9	Radyo Metropol FM (Berlin)	Berliner Fernsehturm	0,5
101.9	Deutschlandfunk (DLF)	Marktoberdorf	0,2
101.9	Radio Seefunk (Hochrhein)	Schopfheim	0,1
101.9	R.SA (Dresden)	Weißwasser/Sorauer Platz	0,5
101.9	Deutschlandfunk (DLF)	Sondershausen	0,1
102.0	BR24	Dillberg	25
102.0	Deutschlandfunk (DLF)	Lingen-Damaschke	25
102.0	Radio BOB! (Hessen)	Limburg-Staffel	0,5
102.0	Deutschlandfunk (DLF)	Magdeburg/Frohser Berg	20
102.0	Hit Radio FFH (Wiesbaden)	Wiesbaden/Konrad Adenauer Ring	0,1
102.0	Radio Neckarburg	Villingen-Schwenningen/Haslach	3
102.0	harmony.fm	Gießen/DTAG	0,5
102.0	MDR Aktuell	Plauen/Kemmler	1
102.0	Radyo Metropol FM (Hessen)	Darmstadt-Weiterstadt	0,4
102.0	Antenne Bayern	Ludwigsstadt	0,02
102.0	Antenne Bayern	Herzogstand/Fahrenbergkopf (MB)	0,1
102.0	Inforadio (RBB)	Frankfurt (Oder)/Booßen	1,6
102.0	R.SH (Hamburg)	Hamburg-Bergedorf	0,1
102.0	Radio SRF 1 (Aargau/Solothurn)	Waldshut/Aarberg	0,5
102.1	RPR1. (Trier)	Scharteberg (Eifel)	20
102.1	Regenbogen 2	Mudau	25
102.1	WDR 2 (Siegen)	Olsberg	10
102.1	BB Radio (Nord-Ost)	Casekow	20
102.1	Radio Chemnitz	Chemnitz-Reichenhain	3
102.1	Antenne Bayern	Passau Dommelstadl	1
102.1	Power Radio	Potsdam	1
102.1	NE-WS 89,4	Grevenbroich/Heyerbusch	0,25
102.1	BR Klassik	Augsburg/Hotelturm	0,1
102.1	Deutschlandfunk (DLF)	Ribnitz	0,2
102.2	DASDING (SWR)	Weinbiet	25
102.2	Antenne Thüringen (West)	Inselsberg	100
102.2	Deutschlandfunk (DLF)	Höhbeck	94
102.2	Berliner Rundfunk 91,4 (Lausitz)	Cottbus Klein Oßnig	3
102.2	Radio Essen	Essen-Stadtwald	0,32
102.2	radio ffn (Göttingen)	Holzminden Höxter	0,5
102.2		Münster-Uppenberg	0,3
102.2	Deutschlandfunk (DLF)	Itzehoe	0,4
102.3	AFN Stuttgart-The Eagle	Stuttgarter Fernmeldeturm	100
102.3	radio ffn (Oldenburg)	Steinkimmen	100
102.3	BR Klassik	Wendelstein	100
102.3	BR Klassik	Ochsenkopf	30
102.3	YOU FM (hr)	Sackpfeife (Biedenkopf)	10
102.3	Radio Brocken (Anhalt)	Wittenberg/Gallunberg	4
102.3	Antenne Unna	Schwerte/Sommerberg	1
102.3	Radio Dreyeckland	Vogtsburg/Totenkopf (Freiburg)	1
102.3	Deutschlandfunk (DLF)	Garding	0,2
102.4	WDR Eins Live	Bonn-Venusberg	50
102.4	radio ffn (Braunschweig)	Torfhaus/DTAG	100
102.4	Radio PSR (Dresden)	Dresden-Wachwitz	100
102.4	R.SH (Kiel)	Kiel/Fernsehturm	15
102.4	Radio Charivari Würzburg	Würzburg/Frankenwarte, DTAG (1)	0,3
102.4	Deutschlandfunk (DLF)	Röbel	3
102.4	BR Klassik	Pfronten	0,05
102.5	hr4 (Rhein-Main)	Großer Feldberg (Taunus)/hr	100
102.5	Radio 7 (Tuttlingen)	Witthoh (Tuttlingen)	40
102.5	Antenne Thüringen (Ost)	Ronneburg (Gera)	30
102.5	NDR 1 Radio MV (Vorpommern)	Garz (Rügen)	50
102.5	Bayern 2 (Südbayern)	Dillberg	10
102.5	R.SH (Lübeck)	Lauenburg	1
102.5		Viersen/Süchtelner Höhen	0,32
102.5	WDR Eins Live	Ibbenbüren-Osterledde	0,5
102.6	RPR1. (Trier)	Saarburg/Geisberg	20
102.6	NDR 2 (Niedersachsen)	Stadthagen/Bückeberg	25
102.6	radio ffn (Cuxhaven)	Cuxhaven Otterndorf	20
102.6	Radio Ton Heilbronn, Franken (Schwäbisch Hall)	Schwäbisch Hall	3
102.6	Fritz (RBB)	Berliner Fernsehturm	15
102.6		Röt	1
102.6	hr2	Korbach/An der Strother Str.	0,5
102.6	RundFunk Meissner	Hessisch Lichtenau	0,32
102.6	Radio Seefunk (Bodensee)	Ravensburg/Hochweiher	0,3
102.6	Radio Charivari Regensburg (Cham)	Waldmünchen-Lengau	0,32
102.6		Schwäbisch Gmünd-Bettringen	0,1
102.6	MDR Aktuell	Weimar-Ehringsdorf	2
102.6	Free FM	Ulm-Ermingen	1
102.6	Die neue Welle (Pforzheim)	Bad Wildbad (Enztal)	0,1
102.7	Deutschlandfunk (DLF)	Nordhelle	20
102.7	Antenne Thüringen (Süd)	Sonneberg/Bleßberg	60
102.7	radio ffn (Heide)	Dannenberg/Zernien	25
102.7	Deutschlandfunk (DLF)	Aachen/Karlshöhe	0,5
102.7	Deutschlandfunk Kultur	Ansbach-Galgenmühle	0,2
102.7	Die neue Welle (Pforzheim)	Nagold	0,1
102.7	NDR Kultur	Heringsdorf (Usedom)	1
102.7	Antenne Bayern	Zugspitze	2
102.7	Radio T	Chemnitz-Reichenhain	1
102.7	apollo radio	Chemnitz-Reichenhain	1
102.7	Radio Cottbus	Forst	0,5
102.8	Radio Regenbogen (Mannheim)	Fernmeldeturm Heidelberg	50
102.8	Deutschlandfunk (DLF)	Wesel-Büderich	50
102.8	radio ffn (Göttingen)	Göttingen/Bovenden	5
102.8	Classic Rock Radio	Saarlouis-Steinrausch	1
102.8	hr4 (Mittelhessen)	Marburg/Spiegelslust	1
102.8	NDR Info (Mecklenburg-Vorpommern)	Rostock-Toitenwinkel	100
102.8	Radio Teddy (Hessen)	Fulda-Maberzell	0,32
102.8	bigFM (Baden-Württemberg)	Freiburg-Stadt/DTAG	0,5
102.8	Deutschlandfunk Kultur	Oldenburg-Wahnbek	1
102.8	Elsterwelle	Hoyerswerda-Ost	1
102.8	R.SH (Flensburg)	Westerland (Sylt)	5
102.8	Radio SAW (Magdeburg/Altmark)	Ziesar	2
102.8	MDR Aktuell	Aschersleben	1
102.9	RPR1. (Koblenz)	Bad Marienberg	15
102.9	Radio PSR (Leipzig)	Leipzig Wiederau	100
102.9	BR Klassik	Bamberg/Geisberg	25
102.9	R.SH (Hamburg)	Kaltenkirchen	20
102.9	RPR1. (Trier)	Trier/Petrisberg	0,1
102.9	hr3	Bad Hersfeld	0,3
102.9	Radio Teddy	Schwerin	0,16
102.9	Antenne Bayern	Bad Tölz/Kalvarienberg	0,2
102.9	Radio Teddy	Mühlhausen Ost	0,5
102.9	Deutschlandfunk Kultur	Lingen-Schepsdorf	0,25
103.0	Antenne Bayern	Pfaffenberg	25
103.0	SWR3 (Alb/Bodensee)	Grünten	50
103.0	Antenne Bayern	Regensburg/Ziegetsberg	25
103.0	AFN Kaiserslautern-The Eagle	Pirmasens/Banana Building	0,5
103.0	Klassik Radio	Göppingen Weilheim	1
103.0	Die neue Welle (Pforzheim)	Calw	0,3
103.0	Radio BOB! (Hessen)	Eschwege	0,5
103.0	Radio Salü	Merzig-Hilbringen	0,1
103.0	Deutschlandfunk Kultur	Löbau	2
103.0		Potsdam/Horstweg	1
103.0	N-JOY	Anklam	1,3
103.0		Nagold	0,1
103.0	MDR JUMP	Magdeburg-Buckau	0,2
103.0	radio TOP 40	Nordhausen	0,1
103.0	Die neue Welle (Freudenstadt)	Wildberg	0,01
103.0	Antenne Bayern	Mittenwald/Partenkirchner Str.	0,05
103.0	Radio Trausnitz	Simbach am Inn	0,05
103.0	Deutschlandfunk Kultur	Helgoland	0,05
103.1	RPR1. (Kaiserslautern)	Bornberg	25
103.1	Fritz (RBB)	Pritzwalk	60
103.1	radio ffn (Meer)	Aurich	25
103.1	radio ffn (Braunschweig)	Braunschweig-Broitzem	15
103.1	Deutschlandfunk (DLF)	Erfurt-Haarberg	2
103.1	Radio BOB! (Hessen)	Gießen/DTAG	0,63
103.1	Radio Seefunk (Hochrhein)	Rheinfelden/Rührberg	5
103.1		Schramberg/Schloßberg	0,1
103.1	Deutschlandfunk Kultur	Bungsberg/DTAG-Turm	0,2
103.1	sunshine live (Rostock)	Stralsund	0,2
103.1	Antenne 1 (Reutlingen)	Reutlingen	0,1
103.2	Antenne Bayern	Ochsenkopf	100
103.2	SWR2 (Rheinland-Pfalz)	Mainz-Kastel	1
103.2	hr4 (Nord-Osthessen)	Habichtswald	20
103.2	Radio Ton Heilbronn, Franken (Heilbronn)	Heilbronn/Schweinsberg	25
103.2	Fritz (RBB)	Cottbus/Calau	100
103.2	BR Klassik	Ismaning	25
103.2	NDR 1 Niedersachsen (Lüneburg)	Rosengarten-Langenrehm	20
103.2	N-JOY	Helpterberg	1,3
103.3	Cosmo	Langenberg	100
103.3	Deutschlandfunk (DLF)	Heidelstein (Rhön)	100
103.3	Antenne Bayern	Unterringingen	25
103.3	RPR1. (Kaiserslautern)	Zweibrücken/Funkturm	2
103.3	Deutschlandfunk (DLF)	Limburg-Staffel	0,25
103.3	Radio SAW (Halle)	Halle/Petersberg	5
103.3	Deutschlandfunk (DLF)	Flensburg Freienwill	20
103.3	RPR1. (Ludwigshafen)	Bad Bergzabern	0,25
103.3	RPR1. (Ludwigshafen)	Mertesheim	0,05
103.3	Radio Mittelweser	Nienburg/Postmast	0,65
103.3	Ostseewelle (Ost)	Heringsdorf (Usedom)	2
103.3	Radio Erzgebirge	Flöha	0,5
103.3	Radio BOB! (Hessen)	Bensheim-Auerbach	0,2
103.3	Radio Paradiso	Ahrenshoop	0,63
103.4	Planet Radio	Bingen	0,2
103.4	Antenne 1 (Reutlingen)	Raichberg	50
103.4	radio ffn (Osnabrück)	Osnabrück/Schleptruper Egge	10
103.4	Energy Berlin	Berliner Fernsehturm	8
103.4	YOU FM (hr)	Herborn-Burg	0,5
103.4	N-JOY	Grevesmühlen Hamberge	5
103.4	Radio Darmstadt	Darmstadt/Office Tower	0,32
103.4	Deutschlandfunk Kultur	Berchtesgaden-Schönau	0,1
103.4	Deutschlandfunk (DLF)	Schiffdorf (Bremerhaven) (nds)	0,5
103.4	Deutschlandfunk Kultur	Füssen-Wasenmoos	0,1
103.4	MDR Kultur	Seifhennersdorf	0,32
103.4	Radio Zwickau	Wilkau-Haßlau	0,5
103.4	Offener Kanal Jena	Jena-Oßmaritz	0,32
103.4	R.SA (Leipzig)	Hagenest	0,5
103.5	RPR1. (Köln)	Ahrweiler/Schöneberg	30
103.5	Deutschlandfunk (DLF)	Torfhaus/DTAG	100
103.5	Radio Ton Heilbronn, Franken (Main-Tauber-Kreis)	Bad Mergentheim-Löffelstelzen	20
103.5	Antenne Bayern	Brotjacklriegel	100
103.5	Deutschlandfunk (DLF)	Oberursel	0,1
103.5	Radio Teddy (Hessen)	Marburg/Lahnberge	0,5
103.5	Radio Dresden	Dresden-Wachwitz	2
103.5	NDR Info (Mecklenburg-Vorpommern)	Malchin/Hardtberg	1
103.5	Radio Erzgebirge	Marienberg	0,5
103.5	Energy Bremen (Oldenburg)	Oldenburg-Wahnbek	0,5
103.5	Vogtland Radio	Klingenthal/Aschberg	0,05
103.5	Deutschlandfunk (DLF)	Ulm-Ermingen	0,5
103.5	delta radio (Nord/West)	Helgoland	0,05
103.6	RPR1. (Ludwigshafen)	Kalmit Edenkoben	25
103.6	MDR Thüringen (Gera)	Remda (Saalfeld)	60
103.6	Radio Hamburg	Hamburg-Moorfleet	80
103.6	Radio Galaxy Aschaffenburg	Alzenau/Hahnenkamm	0,25
103.6	RSA Radio (Bodensee)	Lindau/Hoyerberg	0,5
103.6	egoFM	Nürnberg/DTAG	0,2
103.6	Hellweg Radio	Lippstadt	0,1
103.6	Radio WMW	Gronau	0,1
103.6	Radio Fantasy	Aichach	0,02
103.6	Radio Paradiso	Stralsund	0,25
103.7	UnserDing (SR)	Saarbrücken/Schoksberg	100
103.7	Radio 7 (Aalen)	Aalen	50
103.7	Hit Radio FFH (Nordhessen)	Habichtswald	20
103.7	AFN Wiesbaden-The Eagle	Wiesbaden-Hainerberg	0,5
103.7	Planet Radio	Wetzlar-Aßlar Klein Altenstädten	0,5
103.7	WDR Eins Live	Kleve/Bresserberg	2
103.7	MDR JUMP	Oschatz/Collmberg	5
103.7	Antenne Bayern	Traunstein	5
103.7	N-JOY	Bad Doberan	5
103.7	NDR Info (Niedersachsen)	Molbergen-Peheim (Cloppenburg)	1,6
103.7	Radio Neckarburg	Schramberg/Sulgerberg	0,1
103.7	Radio 7 (Ravensburg)	Sigmaringen/Franziskanerweg	0,1
103.7	Antenne Bayern	Bad Reichenhall/Kirchholz-Froschham	0,3
103.7	Deutschlandfunk Kultur	Weiden	0,1
103.7	Deutschlandfunk Kultur	Rhinow	0,2
103.7	BB Radio (Oderland)	Eisenhüttenstadt	0,63
103.8	WDR 4	Nordhelle	35
103.8	hr4 (Rhein-Main)	Würzberg	5
103.8	Antenne Niedersachsen (Hannover)	Barsinghausen	25
103.8	Antenne MV (Ost)	Helpterberg	100
103.8	Antenne Bayern	Hohenpeißenberg	25
103.8	bigFM (Baden-Württemberg)	Baden-Baden/Fremersberg	2
103.8	Antenne Bayern	Coburg Meeder	5
103.8	Deutschlandfunk (DLF)	Eisleben/Hergisdorf	0,5
103.8	R.SH (Heide)	Heide/Welmbüttel	15
103.8	Elsterwelle	Großräschen	1,3
103.8	Vogtland Radio	Markneukirchen	0,5
103.9	MDR Kultur	Ronneburg (Gera)	30
103.9	hr-info	Frankfurt (Main) Maintower	0,5
103.9	Antenne Thüringen (Nord)	Dingelstädt	5
103.9	Klassik Radio	Stuttgart-Münster	2
103.9	Radio Seefunk (Bodensee)	Iberger Kugel	10
103.9	hr4 (Nord-Osthessen)	Fulda-Künzell/Peter Henlein Str.	0,3
103.9		Burgsinn	0,2
103.9	Radio Q	Steinfurt/Stegerwaldstr.	0,5
103.9	Radio BOB! (Hessen)	Marburg/Lahnberge	0,1
103.9	Radio SAW (Magdeburg/Altmark)	Salzwedel Fleetmark	5
103.9	Radio Charivari Regensburg (Kelheim)	Kelheim	0,5
103.9		Rottenburg	0,1
103.9	Radio Ostfriesland	Leer	0,2
103.9	Radio Ramasuri	Amberg/Mariahilfberg	0,1
103.9	r.s.2	Forst	6
103.9	Deutschlandfunk Kultur	Westerland (Sylt)	0,2
103.9	Radio Paradiso	Schwerin	0,2
104.0	bigFM (Rheinland-Pfalz)	Koblenz/Kühkopf	40
104.0	BR24	Büttelberg	25
104.0	MDR Kultur	Wittenberg/Gallunberg	100
104.0	SWR4 Baden-Württemberg (Radio Südbaden)	Feldberg (Schwarzwald)	5
104.0		Niederkrüchten/Javelin Barracks	2,4
104.0	Deutschlandfunk (DLF)	Sassnitz (Rügen)	8
104.0	hr2	Alsfeld	0,1
104.0	Radio 21 (Süd)	Holzminden Stahle	0,5
104.0		Emlichheim	0,32
104.0	Radio Hamburg (Cityfenster)	Hamburg/Heinrich-Hertz-Turm	0,5
104.0	Radio Arabella	München/Blutenburgstr.	0,1
104.0	Radio Nordseewelle	Norderney	0,05
104.0	Radio RST	Tecklenburg	1
104.1	SWR4 Baden-Württemberg (Kurpfalz Radio)	Fernsehturm Heidelberg	50
104.1	WDR 4	Olsberg	10
104.1	delta radio (Ost)	Bungsberg/DTAG-Turm	50
104.1	Rock Antenne	Kassel/Tannenwäldchen	0,5
104.1	Radio 21 (Ost)	Braunschweig-Broitzem	1
104.1	Radio Trausnitz	Landshut/Weickmannshöhe	1
104.1		Kronach	0,5
104.1	N-JOY	Ueckermünde	1,6
104.1	Freies Radio Freudenstadt	Baiersbronn (Oberes Murgtal)	0,1
104.1	National Public Radio	Berlin-Schöneberg	0,63
104.1	Radio 21 (Nordwest)	Oldenburg-Wahnbek	0,24
104.1	MDR Aktuell	Bischofswerda	0,2
104.1	BR Klassik	Herzogstand/Fahrenbergkopf (BR)	0,08
104.2	Landeswelle Thüringen (West)	Inselsberg	100
104.2	SWR4 Rheinland-Pfalz (Radio Kaiserslautern)	Kettrichhof	5
104.2	Antenne Düsseldorf	Düsseldorf/DTAG Sohnstr.	2
104.2	Berliner Rundfunk 91,4 (Oderland)	Frankfurt (Oder)/Booßen	20
104.2	Antenne Niedersachsen (Hannover)	Visselhövede	10
104.2	Antenne Bayern	Erlenbach bei Marktheidenfeld	0,5
104.2	Radio Seefunk (Bodensee)	Sigmaringen/Franziskanerweg	1
104.2	Radio Bonn/Rhein-Sieg	Bornheim	0,2
104.2	Radio Salü	Mettlach	0,1
104.2		Ludwigsburg	0,1
104.2	Radio Ennepe Ruhr (Nord-Kreis)	Witten-Stockum	0,1
104.2		Ellwangen	0,1
104.2	Radio Charivari Rosenheim	Inntal Oberaudorf	0,3
104.2	Radio Ton Ostwürttemberg	Heidenheim a.d Brenz/Schmittenberg	0,1
104.2	Antenne Bayern	Augsburg/Hotelturm	0,1
104.2	Deutschlandfunk Kultur	Niebüll Süderlügum	0,3
104.2	Deutschlandfunk (DLF)	Tessin	0,32
104.2	Radio Charivari Rosenheim	Prien	0,05
104.2	Radio Dresden	Freiberg/Hauptpostamt	0,2
104.2	Radio SRF 3	Ermatingen (Reichenau)/Oberzell	0,05
104.3	hr4 (Mittelhessen)	Sackpfeife (Biedenkopf)	100
104.3	BB Radio (Prignitz)	Pritzwalk	100
104.3	YOU FM (hr)	Darmstadt-Weiterstadt	0,8
104.3	Antenne Niedersachsen (Osnabrück)	Lingen-Damaschke	15
104.3	Radio Mainwelle	Bayreuth/Oschenberg	10
104.3	Energy Stuttgart (Böblingen)	Sindelfingen/Wasserturm	2
104.3		Schwäbisch Hall/Einkorn	0,5
104.3		Rheindahlen/JHQ (Mönchengladbach)	0,3
104.3		Pforzheim-Arlinger	0,1
104.3	Radio Alpenwelle	Tegernseer Tal/Ringberg	0,5
104.3	radio ffn (Braunschweig)	Seesen/Großer Schildberg	0,32
104.3		Nürtingen Wendlingen	0,1
104.3	Radio Seefunk (Hochrhein)	Lörrach/Tüllingerberg	0,1
104.3		Nordhausen/Petersdorfer Berg	0,1
104.3	Energy Bremen (Bremerhaven)	Schiffdorf (Bremerhaven) (nds)	8
104.3	Deutschlandfunk (DLF)	Greifswald	0,2
104.3	Deutschlandfunk Kultur	Bärenstein (Erzgebirge)	1
104.4	WDR 4	Bärbelkreuz (Eifel)	20
104.4	Antenne Bayern	Grünten	100
104.4	BR24	Hoher Bogen	50
104.4	NDR Kultur	Stadthagen/Bückeberg	25
104.4	Antenne Bayern	Würzburg/Frankenwarte, DTAG (2)	5
104.4	Kulturradio (RBB)	Cottbus/Calau	60
104.4	MDR Sputnik	Halle/Petersberg	10
104.4	Kulturradio (RBB)	Casekow	10
104.4	N-JOY	Güstrow	0,63
104.4	Deutschlandfunk (DLF)	Schwerte/Sommerberg	0,2
104.4	Deutschlandfunk (DLF)	Heide/Welmbüttel	0,6
104.5	bigFM (Rheinland-Pfalz)	Ober-Olm	20
104.5	NDR 1 Welle Nord (Lübeck)	Mölln Fuhlenhagen	20
104.5	Energy Stuttgart (Waiblingen)	Waiblingen Weinstadt/Schönbühl	2
104.5	Landeswelle Thüringen (Nord)	Keula	10
104.5	Bayern 1 (Niederbayern/Oberpfalz)	Dillberg	2
104.5	Freies Radio Wiesental	Hohe Möhr	0,5
104.5	Deutschlandfunk (DLF)	Münster/Fernmeldeturm	0,32
104.5	CampusFM	Duisburg/Uni	0,2
104.5	Energy Stuttgart (Waiblingen)	Winnenden	0,1
104.5	Radio 21 (Nordwest)	Leer	0,32
104.5	Vogtland Radio	Gera/Stadtwald	0,1
104.5	WDR 4	Warburg/Stapelberg	0,5
104.5	Deutschlandfunk (DLF)	Jena-Oßmaritz	0,32
104.5	harmony.fm	Rotenburg an der Fulda	0,05
104.6	Deutschlandfunk (DLF)	Saarburg/Geisberg	20
104.6	Antenne Niedersachsen (Oldenburg/Küste)	Cuxhaven Otterndorf	20
104.6	104.6 RTL	Berliner Fernsehturm	10
104.6	Radio Neckarburg	Oberndorf	1
104.6	Planet Radio	Kassel/Tannenwäldchen	0,5
104.6	Radio Primaton	Hammelburg	0,32
104.6	Planet Radio	Eschwege	0,5
104.6		Mühlacker	0,1
104.6	Planet Radio	Bad Nauheim-Nieder Mörlen	0,5
104.6	Donau 3 FM	Biberach an der Riß	0,32
104.6	Radio Okerwelle 104,6	Braunschweig-Broitzem	0,5
104.6	Deutschlandfunk Kultur	Zwickau Ebersbrunn	0,2
104.6	MDR Aktuell	Saalfeld	0,1
104.6	Radio Regenbogen (Mannheim)	Buchen/Hettinger Str.	0,1
104.6	harmony.fm	Michelstadt	0,1
104.6	Radio Oberland	Herzogstand/Fahrenbergkopf (MB)	0,1
104.7	WDR Eins Live	Nordhelle	35
104.7	RPR1. (Kaiserslautern)	Kettrichhof	5
104.7	harmony.fm	Dieburg	0,2
104.7	Antenne Thüringen (Nord)	Kulpenberg	3
104.7	Hitradio RTL Sachsen (Leipzig)	Oschatz/Collmberg	5
104.7	bigFM (Baden-Württemberg)	Heilbronn/Weinsberg	0,2
104.7	Radio Galaxy Oberfranken	Bamberg/Rothof	0,5
104.7	Radio Ton Heilbronn, Franken (Main-Tauber-Kreis)	Wertheim Kreuzwertheim	0,1
104.7		Achern	0,1
104.7		Nördlingen	0,1
104.7	Radio 8	Rothenburg ob der Tauber	0,05
104.7		Bergen-Hohne	0,16
104.7	Deutschlandfunk Kultur	Kiel/Fernsehturm	0,3
104.7	Antenne Bayern	Pfronten	0,05
104.7		Bad Lobenstein/Geiersberg	0,63
104.7	Die Neue 107,7	Geislingen/Tegelberg	0,1
104.8	hr1	Heidelstein (Rhön)	50
104.8	bigFM (Rheinland-Pfalz)	Bad Kreuznach/Schanzenkopf	0,2
104.8	Querfunk	Karlsruhe-Grünwettersbach	1
104.8	Lernradio	Karlsruhe-Grünwettersbach	1
104.8	Neckaralb Live	Reutlingen	1
104.8	Ostseewelle (Nord)	Rostock-Toitenwinkel	100
104.8		Donaueschingen Stadt	1
104.8	Radio Hochstift	Holzminden Höxter	0,5
104.8	MDR Sputnik	Stendal-Borstel	1
104.8	StHörfunk	Crailsheim	0,1
104.8	Radio IN	Pfaffenhofen an der Ilm/Wolfsberg	0,2
104.8	Antenne Bayern	Ulm/DTAG	0,1
104.8	MDR Sachsen (Chemnitz)	Markneukirchen	0,5
104.8	Radio Teddy	Bremen-Walle	0,1
104.8	BR24	Reit im Winkl	0,1
104.8	Radio Hochstift	Büren	0,1
104.8	Radio Ramasuri	Neusorg	0,05
104.8	delta radio (Nord/West)	Westerland (Sylt)	5
104.8	BR24	Ludwigsstadt-Ebersdorf	0,05
104.8	osradio 104,8	Osnabrück/Dörenberg (Grafensundern)	1
104.8	R.SA (Chemnitz)	Annaberg-Buchholz	0,5
104.9	bigFM (Rheinland-Pfalz)	Ahrweiler/Schöneberg	30
104.9	Radio SAW (Halle)	Leipzig Wiederau	100
104.9	Antenne Niedersachsen (Oldenburg/Küste)	Aurich	25
104.9	Hitradio Ohr	Offenburg	5
104.9	sunshine live	Stuttgart-Münster	1
104.9		Würzburg/Leighton Barracks	0,9
104.9	AFN Bavaria-The Eagle	Illesheim/Storck-Barracks	0,38
104.9	Rock Antenne	Marburg/Lahnberge	0,1
104.9	Radio BOB! (Schleswig-Holstein) (Hamburg)	Itzehoe	1
104.9	Radio Sauerland	Meschede	0,1
104.9		Steinfurt-Burgsteinfurt	0,25
104.9	Radio B2 (Berlin/Brandenburg)	Eberswalde	0,8
104.9	Radio 21 (Mitte)	Hannover/Telemax	0,3
104.9	BR24	Garmisch-Partenk,/Kreuzeck	0,1
104.9	BR24	Bad Tölz-Gaißach	0,1
104.9	Radio B2 (Berlin/Brandenburg)	Zehlendorf (Oranienburg)	1,3
104.9	Energy Sachsen (Dresden)	Wilthen	0,5
105.0	Hit Radio FFH (Südhessen)	Krehberg	20
105.0	Deutschlandfunk Kultur	Neunkirchen (Saar)/Kuchenberg	5
105.0	Radio 7 (Ravensburg)	Iberger Kugel	50
105.0	BR24	Hohe Linie	25
105.0	Antenne Frankfurt 95,1	Wetzlar-Aßlar Klein Altenstädten	0,5
105.0	BFBS Radio 2	Paderborn-Sennelager	0,3
105.0	Radio Lippe Welle Hamm	Hamm/Gallberger Weg	0,2
105.0	MDR Sputnik	Salzwedel Fleetmark	1
105.0	Radio Essen	Essen-Holsterhausen	0,1
105.0	Antenne AC	Monschau/St. Michael Gymnasium	0,05
105.0	Bayern 1 (Oberbayern)	Bad Reichenhall/Kirchholz-Steilhofweg	0,3
105.0	N-JOY	Damme	1
105.0	Radio Erzgebirge	Zschopau	0,2
105.0	BB Radio (Brandenburg)	Brandenburg	3
105.0	Deutschlandfunk Kultur	Güby (Schleswig)	0,16
105.1	Hit Radio FFH (Nordhessen)	Hoher Meißner	100
105.1	AFN Kaiserslautern-The Eagle	Kaiserslautern-Vogelweh	2
105.1	Deutschlandfunk Kultur	Limburg-Staffel	0,32
105.1	Deutschlandfunk (DLF)	Blauen	10
105.1	Antenne Niedersachsen (Hamburg)	Rosengarten-Langenrehm	20
105.1	Antenne MV (Nord)	Garz (Rügen)	50
105.1	AFN Spangdahlem-The Eagle	Bitburg/Flugplatz	1
105.1	Deutschlandfunk (DLF)	Kaiserslautern/Dansenberg	0,2
105.1		Rheinberg/AEZ Asdonkshof	0,5
105.1	Klassik Radio (Bayern)	Nürnberg-Schweinau	0,5
105.1	Radio Saarschleifenland 106,1	Merzig-Hilbringen	0,1
105.1	Radio Ramasuri	Wiesau	0,5
105.1	bigFM (Baden-Württemberg)	Heubach	0,32
105.1	MDR Aktuell	Schleiz	0,2
105.1	Sender KW	Königs Wusterhausen	0,8
105.1	R.SA (Dresden)	Görlitz/Fichtenhöhe	1
105.2	DASDING (SWR)	Mainz-Kastel	1
105.2	bigFM (Baden-Württemberg)	Langenbrand	20
105.2	Hitradio RTL Sachsen (Dresden)	Dresden-Wachwitz	100
105.2	Radio Berg	Lindlar/Brungerst	4
105.2	Radio Arabella	Ismaning	11
105.2	Antenne Frankfurt 95,1	Gießen/DTAG	0,5
105.2	Deutschlandfunk (DLF)	Casekow	6,3
105.2	MDR Sputnik	Magdeburg/Frohser Berg	1,5
105.2	SRB.FM	Saalfeld	0,3
105.2	Radio Vest	Dorsten/RCG Kraftfutterwerk	0,1
105.2	RSA Radio (Ostallgäu)	Obergünzburg	0,1
105.2	Radio RST	Schöppingen	4
105.2		Leer	0,1
105.2	Deutschlandfunk Kultur	Mittenwald/Partenkirchner Str.	0,05
105.2	Offener Kanal Westküste	Heide	0,05
105.2	Radio Horeb	Balderschwang/Kreuzle-Alm	0,02
105.2	N-JOY	Rinteln	0,1
105.3	BR24	Kreuzberg (Rhön)	100
105.3	NDR Info (Mecklenburg-Vorpommern)	Schwerin	100
105.3	Deutschlandfunk Kultur	Koblenz/Bendorf (Vierwindenhöhe)	0,32
105.3	Deutschlandfunk Kultur	Saarburg/Rauschhof	0,1
105.3	Antenne Bayern	Högl	1
105.3	Radio Seefunk (Bodensee)	Radolfzell Singen	0,3
105.3	Deutschlandfunk Kultur	Norden	0,25
105.3	Radio Tonkuhle	Hildesheim/Steinberg	1
105.4	Hitradio RTL Sachsen (Chemnitz)	Chemnitz/Geyer	100
105.4	Radio Siegen	Aue/Hohe Hessel	4
105.4	harmony.fm	Bad Camberg	0,2
105.4	NDR 1 Niedersachsen (Oldenburg)	Cuxhaven/Holter Höhe	20
105.4	harmony.fm	Frankfurt (Main) Europaturm	0,25
105.4	Antenne 1 (Göppingen)	Geislingen/Oberböhringen	1
105.4	Antenne 1 (Reutlingen)	Balingen-Frommern Laufen	0,3
105.4	bermuda.funk	Fernmeldeturm Heidelberg	0,05
105.4	Antenne MV (Ost)	Heringsdorf (Usedom)	2,5
105.4	RadioAktiv	Fernmeldeturm Heidelberg	0,05
105.4	Radio Brocken (Harz)	Wernigerode	0,5
105.4	Radio Seefunk (Hochrhein)	Waldshut-Tiengen	0,1
105.4		Dortmund/Florianturm	0,05
105.4	Radio IN	Beilngries	0,1
105.4		Viersen/Süchtelner Höhen	0,1
105.4	Antenne Bayern	Hindelang	0,05
105.4	Radio Oberland	Oberammergau/Laber	0,1
105.4		Ahrenshoop	0,32
105.5	WDR Eins Live	Teutoburger Wald/Bielstein	100
105.5	WDR Eins Live	Bärbelkreuz (Eifel)	20
105.5	SWR4 Baden-Württemberg (Franken Radio)	Bad Mergentheim-Löffelstelzen	10
105.5	YOU FM (hr)	Wetzlar-Niedergirmes	0,32
105.5	105'5 Spreeradio	Berliner Fernsehturm	5
105.5	Hitradio Ohr	Bühlertal	0,5
105.5	Radio Trausnitz	Landau an der Isar	0,32
105.5		Grimmen	0,5
105.5	Radio Galaxy Amberg/Weiden	Amberg/Mariahilfberg	0,063
105.5	Radio Charivari Regensburg (Cham)	Lam	0,1
105.5		Augsburg/Hotelturm	0,1
105.5	Deutschlandfunk Kultur	Kaltenkirchen	0,1
105.5	Antenne Bayern	Berchtesgaden/Obersalzberg	0,1
105.6	SWR4 Rheinland-Pfalz (Radio Kaiserslautern)	Donnersberg	60
105.6	MDR JUMP	Remda (Saalfeld)	60
105.6	Hitradio RTL Sachsen (Löbau)	Löbau	30
105.6	delta radio (Nord/West)	Flensburg Freienwill	20
105.6	delta radio (Ost)	Lauenburg	1
105.6	hr3	Alsfeld	0,1
105.6	Deutschlandfunk Kultur	Nürnberg-Schweinau	0,1
105.6	CampusFM	Essen/Universität	0,05
105.6	JazzRadio Rostock	Rostock-Toitenwinkel	0,2
105.7	SWR2 (Baden-Württemberg)	Stuttgarter Fernsehturm	80
105.7	Antenne Niedersachsen (Oldenburg/Küste)	Steinkimmen	100
105.7	BR24	Wendelstein	100
105.7	Radio Brocken (Magdeburg)	Magdeburg/Frohser Berg	15
105.7	Radio BOB! (Hessen)	Fulda-Künzell/Dicker Turm	0,32
105.7	Antenne Niederrhein	Geldern/Poststr.	0,5
105.7	Radio Berg	Waldbröl	1
105.7	BR24	Würzburg/Frankenwarte, BR	0,2
105.7	Antenne Niedersachsen (Hannover)	Holzminden Höxter	0,5
105.7	hr3	Rotenburg an der Fulda	0,32
105.7	WDR Eins Live	Hallenberg	0,1
105.7	Radio Ennepe Ruhr (Süd-Kreis)	Gevelsberg/Hindenburghöhe	0,1
105.8	Ostseewelle (Ost)	Helpterberg	100
105.8	Radio Erft	Köln/Colonius	2
105.8	Freies Radio Kassel	Kassel/Tannenwäldchen	0,5
105.8	Rockland Radio (Trier-Bitburg)	Trier/Petrisberg	0,1
105.8	Landeswelle Thüringen (Ost)	Gera/Stadtwald	1
105.8	Radio Galaxy Ansbach	Ansbach/Telekom	0,1
105.8	MDR Aktuell	Mühlhausen	0,1
105.8	MDR Aktuell	Sonneberg/Schönberg	0,1
105.8	Landeswelle Thüringen (Nord)	Nordhausen	0,1
105.8	Radio Primaton	Königsberg	0,32
105.8		Forchheim Pinzberg	0,05
105.8	HAMBURG ZWEI	Ahrensburg	0,5
105.8	Radio 21 (Mitte)	Sibbesse (Hildesheim)	1
105.8	Antenne MV (West)	Grevesmühlen Hamberge	0,16
105.9	Hit Radio FFH (Rhein-Main)	Großer Feldberg (Taunus)/hr	100
105.9	MDR Aktuell	Oschatz/Collmberg	30
105.9	Antenne Niedersachsen (Osnabrück)	Osnabrück/Schleptruper Egge	10
105.9	Donau 3 FM	Ulm-Ermingen	5
105.9	delta radio (Mitte)	Kiel/Fernsehturm	15
105.9		Rastatt	0,1
105.9	Radio Charivari Regensburg (Schwandorf)	Nabburg	0,32
105.9	BR24	Passau/Kühberg	0,3
105.9	Deutschlandfunk Kultur	Donaueschingen Stadt	0,5
105.9	105.9 Radio Paradiso	Frankfurt (Oder)/Booßen	1,6
106.0	Hitradio RTL Sachsen (Vogtland)	Auerbach/Schöneck	30
106.0	baden.fm	Blauen	8,4
106.0	Antenne Niedersachsen (Göttingen)	Göttingen/Bovenden	5
106.0		Dortmund/Florianturm	3,2
106.0		Illesheim/Storck-Barracks	0,38
106.0	Radio 21 (Nordost)	Buxtehude	1
106.0	Radio B2 (Berlin/Brandenburg)	Berliner Fernsehturm	1
106.0	Deutschlandfunk (DLF)	Güstrow	0,8
106.0	Antenne 1 (Heilbronn)	Bad Mergentheim/Drillberg	0,1
106.0	Deutschlandfunk (DLF)	Rottweil/Rote Steige	0,05
106.0	Antenne Bayern	Weiler (Allgäu)/Simmerberg	0,1
106.0	Lamberti Radio (Kirchenfunk)	Aurich/Lamberti-Kirche	0,006
106.1	Deutschlandfunk Kultur	Bärbelkreuz (Eifel)	20
106.1	Deutschlandfunk Kultur	Olsberg	10
106.1	Radio Eins (RBB)	Casekow	63
106.1	Antenne Niedersachsen (Hamburg)	Dannenberg/Zernien	25
106.1	Regenbogen 2 (Rhein-Neckar Aktuell)	Fernmeldeturm Heidelberg	1
106.1	BR24	Gelbelsee	10
106.1	SWR4 Rheinland-Pfalz (Radio Trier)	Kirn	0,1
106.1	Landeswelle Thüringen (Mitte)	Jena-Oßmaritz	1
106.1	Radio Saarschleifenland 106,1	Mettlach	0,1
106.1		Waiblingen	0,1
106.1	Die Neue 107,7	Göppingen/Bartenhöhe	1
106.1	MDR Aktuell	Arnstadt	0,5
106.1	MDR Aktuell	Dresden-Wachwitz	0,5
106.1	AFN Kaiserslautern-The Eagle	Baumholder/Wilhelmswald	0,02
106.1	Radio Bamberg	Burglesau	0,1
106.1		Kalkar/Beginenberg	0,04
106.1	Deutschlandfunk (DLF)	Pirmasens/Biebermühler Str.	0,4
106.1	Deutschlandfunk (DLF)	Stadthagen/Bückeberg	1
106.1	R.SA (Dresden)	Ebersbach	0,5
106.1	Kirchenfunk St. Nicolaus	Herzlake	0,006
106.2	hr3	Heidelstein (Rhön)	50
106.2	Antenne Brandenburg (Potsdam)	Belzig	100
106.2	Deutschlandfunk Kultur	Moseltal (Perl)	5
106.2	Deutschlandfunk Kultur	Traben-Trarbach	0,2
106.2	Deutschlandfunk Kultur	Schiffdorf (Bremerhaven) (nds)	5
106.2	Donau 3 FM	Riedlingen/Österberg	0,5
106.2	egoFM	Erlangen	0,2
106.2	afk-max	Erlangen	0,2
106.2	106.2 Radio Oberhausen	Oberhausen-Buschhausen	0,1
106.2	Deutschlandfunk Kultur	Bielefeld/DTAG	0,1
106.2	Deutschlandfunk Kultur	Demmin	0,5
106.2	Radio Oberland	Garmisch-Partenk,/Kreuzeck	0,2
106.2	Radio Alpenwelle	Schliersee	0,1
106.2	Radio BOB! (Schleswig-Holstein) (Ost)	Bungsberg/DTAG-Turm	0,13
106.2	R.SA (Dresden)	Kamenz West	0,2
106.3	Deutschlandfunk Kultur	Bingen	0,2
106.3	SWR4 Rheinland-Pfalz (Radio Koblenz)	Bad Marienberg	25
106.3	Deutschlandfunk (DLF)	Hornisgrinde	80
106.3	Antenne Niedersachsen (Braunschweig)	Torfhaus/DTAG	100
106.3	r.s.2	Spremberg	4
106.3	Deutschlandfunk (DLF)	Schwerin	2
106.3	Deutschlandfunk (DLF)	Burgbernheim	0,2
106.3	RSA Radio (Ostallgäu)	Eisenberg (Allgäu)	0,5
106.3	Deutschlandfunk Kultur	Chemnitz-Reichenhain	0,5
106.3		Osnabrück-Dodesheide	0,1
106.3		Stralsund	0,5
106.3		Falkenstein	0,1
106.3		Zingst	0,2
106.3		Emden	0,25
106.3	Radio Eins	Pressig Rothenkirchen	0,02
106.3	Radio Kiepenkerl	Dülmen	0,025
106.4	BR24	Pfaffenberg	25
106.4	WDR Eins Live	Aachen/Stolberg	20
106.4	SWR4 Rheinland-Pfalz (Radio Trier)	Idar-Oberstein Hillschied	1
106.4	NDR 1 Welle Nord (Norderstedt)	Neumünster Armstedt	20
106.4	TOP FM	Fürstenfeldbruck Schöngeising	5
106.4	bigFM (Rheinland-Pfalz)	Trier/Petrisberg	0,1
106.4	MDR Kultur	Markneukirchen	0,5
106.4	Radio Ramasuri	Königstein	0,1
106.4	BR24	Berchtesgaden-Schönau	0,3
106.4	MDR Aktuell	Köthen	0,3
106.4	MDR Aktuell	Zittau	0,2
106.4	Radio St. Laurentius	Herzebrock	0,01
106.4	R.SA (Dresden)	Riesa	2
106.4	Inn-Salzach-Welle	Lohkirchen	0,3
106.4	NDR Info (Niedersachsen)	Damme	0,5
106.4	Antenne Sylt	Westerland (Sylt)	0,01
106.4	Radio SRF 1 (Aargau/Solothurn)	Eggberg	0,25
106.5	MDR Sachsen-Anhalt (Halle)	Leipzig Wiederau	30
106.5	Deutschlandfunk (DLF)	Bad Kreuznach/Schanzenkopf	0,05
106.5	Radio Sauerland	Hallenberg	0,5
106.5	Deutschlandfunk (DLF)	Eisenach	0,5
106.5	Radio Sauerland	Arnsberg/Schloßberg	0,25
106.5	oldenburg eins	Oldenburg-Wahnbek	1
106.5		Mertesheim	0,05
106.5		Bruchsal/Benzengasse	0,1
106.5	Deutschlandfunk (DLF)	Heidelberg West	0,4
106.5		Merzig/Stadthalle	0,05
106.5	radio leinehertz 106,5	Hannover/Telemax	0,3
106.5	afk-max	Nürnberg/DTAG	0,1
106.5		Nordhorn/Brit, Kaserne	0,1
106.5	Radio B2 (Mecklenburg-Vorpommern)	Rostock-Toitenwinkel	0,63
106.5	Klassik Radio	Flensburg/Wassersleben	0,1
106.5	Die Neue 107.7	Kirchheim (Teck)/Wasserturm	0,15
106.5	R.SA (Dresden)	Wilthen	1
106.6	SWR4 Baden-Württemberg (Franken Radio)	Waldenburg	50
106.6	bigFM (Rheinland-Pfalz)	Scharteberg (Eifel)	9,5
106.6	Antenne Brandenburg (Perleberg)	Pritzwalk	100
106.6	bigFM (Rheinland-Pfalz)	Zweibrücken/Funkturm	1
106.6	Antenne Mainz (Mainz)	Mainz/Bonifaziustürme	0,32
106.6	Radio BOB! (Hessen)	Bad Nauheim-Nieder Mörlen	0,5
106.6	Radio Lippe	Lemgo/Wiembecker Berg	1
106.6	hr2	Fulda-Künzell/Peter Henlein Str.	0,3
106.6	baden.fm	Titisee-Neustadt/Hochfirst	0,25
106.6	harmony.fm	Fritzlar	0,1
106.6	Radio Westfalica	Lübbecke/Bohlenstr.	0,2
106.6	YOU FM (hr)	Eschwege	0,1
106.6	Radio Ramasuri	Schmidmühlen	0,2
106.6	BR24	Landshut-Altdorf	1
106.6	Radio 21 (Nordost)	Cuxhaven Stadt	0,63
106.6	Radio Galaxy Rosenheim	Rosenheim/FMT	0,1
106.6	Radio LOTTE	Weimar-Ehringsdorf	2
106.6	Antenne Bayern	Eichstätt/Wintershof	0,5
106.6	Radio Erzgebirge	Annaberg-Buchholz	1
106.6	Kirchenfunk Esterwegen	Esterwegen	0,01
106.6	Deutschlandfunk (DLF)	Warburg/Stapelberg	0,2
106.6	Radio SAW (Halle)	Berga	0,48
106.7	bigFM (Rheinland-Pfalz)	Kalmit Edenkoben	25
106.7	WDR Eins Live	Langenberg	70
106.7	Landeswelle Thüringen (Süd)	Sonneberg/Bleßberg	60
106.7	BR24	Oberammergau/Laber	2
106.7	Antenne Niedersachsen (Göttingen)	Hann. Münden Laubach	0,5
106.7		Augsburg/Hotelturm	0,3
106.7	Deutschlandfunk Kultur	Pulsnitz/Königsbrück	0,5
106.7	NDR Info (Niedersachsen)	Nienburg/Postmast	0,25
106.7		Bergen-Hohne	0,16
106.7	Antenne Bayern	Bayrischzell	0,1
106.7	MDR Aktuell	Schneidlingen	0,5
106.8	Hit Radio FFH (Mittelhessen)	Driedorf/Höllberg	32
106.8	alsterradio 106,8	Hamburg-Rahlstedt	40
106.8	Die Neue 107,7	Nürtingen-Oberensingen	1
106.8	JazzRadio	Berlin/Scholzplatz	2
106.8	Radio Gütersloh	Borgholzhausen	0,4
106.8	Antenne Thüringen (Nord)	Nordhausen	0,1
106.8	harmony.fm	Hanau/Hühnerberg	0,5
106.8	Ostseewelle (Ost)	Greifswald	0,16
106.8		Stuttgart/Schleyerhalle	0,01
106.8		Hameln-Holtensen	0,02
106.9	Hit Radio FFH (Wiesbaden)	Bingen	0,32
106.9	Hitradio RTL Sachsen (Leipzig)	Leipzig Wiederau	100
106.9	BR24	Grünten	100
106.9	BR24	Brotjacklriegel	100
106.9	Radio Euskirchen	Schleiden/Broicher Höhe	4
106.9	106.9 Radio Gong	Würzburg/Frankenwarte, DTAG (2)	5
106.9	Antenne Niedersachsen (Braunschweig)	Braunschweig-Broitzem	13
106.9	hr2	Bad Hersfeld	0,32
106.9	Radio 21 (Südwest)	Lingen-Damaschke	0,5
106.9	Energy Nürnberg	Nürnberg-Schweinau	0,3
106.9	Deutschlandfunk Kultur	Aurich-Haxtum	1
106.9	MDR Aktuell	Görlitz Jauernick	1
106.9	Antenne 1 (Mittlerer Neckar)	Leonberg	0,1
106.9		Frankfurt (Oder) Süd	0,2
106.9	Deutschlandfunk (DLF)	Hofgeismar	0,32
107.0	hr-info	Darmstadt-Weiterstadt	5
107.0	WDR Eins Live	Olsberg	10
107.0	NDR 2 (Mecklenburg-Vorpommern)	Röbel	60
107.0	Radio Seefunk (Hochrhein)	Wannenberg	5
107.0	Deutschlandfunk (DLF)	Mühlhausen	1
107.0		Miltenberg/Fährweg	0,2
107.0	Antenne 1 (Pforzheim)	Pforzheim/Wartberg	1
107.0	Deutschlandfunk (DLF)	Ingolstadt-Stammham	0,5
107.0	Radio Dresden	Freital	0,2
107.0	SWR1 Baden-Württemberg	Freiburg-Lehen	0,1
107.0	Freies Radio in Rendsburg und Umland	Schleswig	0,5
107.0	R.SA (Dresden)	Sohland	0,2
107.0		Angermünde	0,5
107.0	RadioAktiv - Der Jurtenfunk	Eggebek	0,005
107.1	SWR4 Rheinland-Pfalz (Radio Trier)	Haardtkopf	25
107.1	Deutschlandfunk (DLF)	Bremen-Walle	100
107.1	Radio Ton Ostwürttemberg	Aalen	20
107.1	BR24	Ochsenkopf	30
107.1	Radio Köln	Köln/Sternengasse	0,5
107.1	BR24	Hochberg (Traunstein)	5
107.1	Stadtradio Göttingen	Göttingen/Bovenden	1
107.1	Regenbogen 2 (Rhein-Neckar Aktuell)	Wiesloch	0,1
107.1	Deutschlandfunk (DLF)	Dessau	0,3
107.1	MDR JUMP	Zittau	0,5
107.1	Deutschlandfunk Kultur	Heringsdorf (Usedom)	0,5
107.1	Radio Brocken (Halle)	Sangerhausen	0,1
107.1	BR24	Bad Reichenhall/Kirchholz-Steilhofweg	0,05
107.1		Alzenau/Hahnenkamm	0,1
107.1	Deutschlandfunk Kultur	Brandenburg-Stadt	0,8
107.1	Radio SRF 3	Wangen-Salen/Unterbühlhof	0,1
107.2	WDR Eins Live	Ederkopf	15
107.2	SWR3 (Rheinland-Pfalz/Rheinland)	Kettrichhof	5
107.2	BB Radio (Niederlausitz)	Cottbus/Calau	100
107.2	Deutschlandfunk Kultur	Mainz-Kastel	0,4
107.2	Rockland Sachsen-Anhalt	Schneidlingen	2,4
107.2	Klassik Radio (Bayern)	München/Olympiaturm	1
107.2		Sinsheim	0,1
107.2	Radyo Metropol FM (Nordrhein-Westfalen)	Hattingen	0,1
107.2	radio TOP 40	Weimar/Großer Ettersberg	0,25
107.2	Deutschlandfunk (DLF)	Warendorf	1
107.2	Radio BOB! (Schleswig-Holstein) (Nord/West)	Niebüll Süderlügum	0,16
107.2	DASDING (SWR)	Ravensburg/Weingarten (Schussental)	0,1
107.2	Deutschlandfunk Kultur	Michelstadt	0,1
107.2	Radio Erzgebirge	Bärenstein (Erzgebirge)	0,16
107.3	hr4 (Nord-Osthessen)	Heidelstein (Rhön)	50
107.3	SWR4 Baden-Württemberg (Radio Tübingen)	Raichberg	25
107.3	Ostseewelle (West)	Schwerin	100
107.3	r.s.2	Casekow	20
107.3	AFN Bavaria-The Eagle	Katterbach Ansbach	1
107.3		Mannheim-Käfertal	0,05
107.3	WDR Eins Live	Holzminden Höxter	0,5
107.3	Die neue Welle (Karlsruhe)	Bruchsal/Benzengasse	0,1
107.3	Hellweg Radio	Wickede (Ruhr)	0,2
107.3		Gera/Stadtwald	0,5
107.3	MDR Kultur	Halle/Gerberstraße	0,1
107.3	Deutschlandfunk Kultur	Kaufbeuren	0,1
107.3	Deutschlandfunk Kultur	Burglengenfeld	0,1
107.3	BR24	Balderschwang/Kreuzle-Alm	0,02
107.3	Radio Chemnitz	Limbach-Oberfrohna	0,1
107.4	SWR4 Rheinland-Pfalz (Radio Koblenz)	Koblenz/Waldesch	40
107.4	MDR Kultur	Magdeburg/Burg Kapaunberg	30
107.4	Hitradio Ohr	Lahr/Schutterlindenberg	5
107.4	delta radio (Süd)	Kaltenkirchen	16
107.4	Radio Wuppertal	Wuppertal/Westfalenweg	1
107.4	Radio Kiepenkerl	Coesfeld	1
107.4	R.SA (Leipzig)	Grimma	2
107.4		Wiesloch	0,1
107.4	Radio Euskirchen	Bad Münstereifel	0,1
107.4	harmony.fm	Korbach/An der Strother Str.	0,2
107.4	Radio Trausnitz	Pfarrkirchen Postmünster	1
107.4		Winnenden	0,1
107.4	Deutschlandfunk (DLF)	Anklam	1
107.4	Die Neue 107.7	Gosbach	0,1
107.4	Klassik Radio	Hannover/Telemax	0,15
107.4	Radio Teddy	Nordhausen	0,2
107.4	Radio Charivari Regensburg (Kelheim)	Siegenburg	0,1
107.4	Antenne Bayern	Schliersee	0,1
107.4		Langeoog	0,032
107.4	Radio Lippe	Extertal	1
107.4	BR24	Ulm/Kuhberg	0,08
107.4	Deutschlandfunk (DLF)	Helgoland	0,05
107.5	SWR4 Baden-Württemberg (Kurpfalz Radio)	Buchen/Walldürner Straße	25
107.5	BB Radio (Potsdam/Berlin)	Berliner Fernsehturm	40
107.5	WDR Eins Live	Siegen-Giersberg	0,5
107.5	Deutschlandfunk Kultur	Saarbrücken/Winterberg	0,4
107.5	Radio Teddy (Hessen)	Frankfurt (Main) Raimundstr. 48–54	0,2
107.5	Deutschlandfunk Kultur	Gießen/DTAG	0,32
107.5	Radio Gütersloh	Oelde-Stromberg	1
107.5	Radio Rur	Linnich	0,1
107.5	Deutschlandfunk (DLF)	Uelzen/Sprakensehl	0,5
107.5	Vogtland Radio	Altenburg	0,5
107.5	egoFM	Regensburg/Ziegetsberg	0,32
107.5	hr-info	Kassel-Wilhelmshöhe	1
107.5	harmony.fm	Bensheim-Auerbach	0,2
107.5	Radio Nordseewelle	Wilhelmshaven	0,4
107.5		Landsberg am Lech-Pößing	0,2
107.5	Radio Dresden	Meißen	0,2
107.5	BR24	Burgberg/Halden (Sonthofen)	0,01
107.6	bigFM (Rheinland-Pfalz)	Bornberg	25
107.6	Antenne Thüringen (Mitte)	Remda (Saalfeld)	60
107.6	BR24	Hühnerberg	20
107.6	Ostseewelle (Nord)	Garz (Rügen)	50
107.6	Radio Lausitz	Löbau	30
107.6		Bonn-Bad Godesberg/Mehlem	0,25
107.6	Radio Sauerland	Sundern (Sauerland)	0,5
107.6	Radio K.W.	Wesel-Büderich	0,2
107.6	Radio Neckarburg	Tuttlingen/Witthohsteige	0,1
107.6	Radio Leverkusen	Leverkusen-Wiesdorf	0,1
107.6	Radio 21 (Bremen)	Bremen-Walle	0,2
107.6	radio ffn (Hannover)	Hameln Stadt	0,05
107.6		Hohe Warte	0,05
107.6	Kirchenfunk Lorup	Lorup	0,01
107.7	Hit Radio FFH (Nordhessen)	Hohes Lohr	20
107.7	Antenne Bayern	Hochries	50
107.7	Die Neue 107,7	Stuttgarter Fernmeldeturm	4
107.7	Deutschlandfunk Kultur	Cuxhaven Otterndorf	20
107.7	Regenbogen 2 (Rhein-Neckar Aktuell)	Weinheim/Wachenburg	0,1
107.7	baden.fm	Freiburg-Littenweiler	0,5
107.7	R.SA	Fichtelberg (Erzgebirge)	2
107.7	Radio Erzgebirge R.SA 107.7	Fichtelberg (Erzgebirge)	2
107.7	107.7 Radio Hagen	Hagen-Eilpe	0,2
107.7	bigFM (Rheinland-Pfalz)	Betzdorf/Weißenstein	0,5
107.7	Hellweg Radio	Belecke (Warstein)	0,2
107.7	Antenne MV (West)	Güstrow	1,3
107.7	AFN Bavaria-The Eagle	Vilseck/Rose Barracks	0,25
107.7	WDR Eins Live	Bad Oeynhausen/Wittekindsberg	0,1
107.7	Deutschlandfunk Kultur	Hanau/Hühnerberg	0,32
107.7	Deutschlandfunk Kultur	Wittenberg/Gallunberg	0,5
107.7	delta radio (Süd)	Hamburg-Bergedorf	0,1
107.8	MDR Kultur	Brocken	10
107.8	BB Radio (Oderland)	Frankfurt (Oder)/Booßen	30
107.8	Antenne AC	Aachen/Stolberg	0,4
107.8	Radyo Metropol FM (Nordrhein-Westfalen)	Attendorn/Stadthalle	0,2
107.8	Radyo Metropol FM (Südwest)	Koblenz/Bendorf (Vierwindenhöhe)	0,32
107.8	Deutschlandfunk Kultur	Neumünster	0,5
107.8	STAR FM 107,8/99,0	Schwabach	0,32
107.8	BR24	Pfronten	0,05
107.9	Rockland Radio (Rhein-Main)	Hohe Wurzel	20
107.9	BR Klassik	Kreuzberg (Rhön)	100
107.9	WDR Eins Live	Münster/Baumberge	25
107.9	delta radio (Ost)	Lübeck Berkenthin	20
107.9	Neckaralb Live	Sickingen/Wasserturm	1
107.9	BB Radio (Potsdam/Berlin)	Gransee	5
107.9	Radio Bonn/Rhein-Sieg	Herchen Rosbach	0,1
107.9		Furtwangen	1
107.9	Die neue Welle (Karlsruhe)	Bretten	0,1
107.9	bigFM (Baden-Württemberg)	Mosbach	0,1
107.9	Rockland Radio (Trier-Bitburg)	Bitburg/Fernmeldeturm	0,1
107.9	R.SA (Leipzig)	Döbeln	1
107.9	SWR4 Baden-Württemberg (Radio Stuttgart)	Geislingen/Oberböhringen	0,1
107.9	Radio Teddy	Schiffdorf (Bremerhaven) (nds)	0,32
107.9	Radio RSG	Remscheid-Hohenhagen	0,1
107.9		Berchtesgaden-Schönau	0,3
107.9	Radio Galaxy Ingolstadt	Ingolstadt/Bayern-Werk	0,1
107.9	Unser Radio Deggendorf	Brotjacklriegel	0,2
107.9	Deutschlandfunk Kultur	Lebach/Hoxberg	0,1
107.9	Deutschlandfunk Kultur	Amberg/Mariahilfberg	0,09
107.9	MDR Aktuell	Schmölln	0,2
107.9	Deutschlandfunk Kultur	Landsberg am Lech	0,05
107.9	Ostseewelle (Ost)	Demmin	0,2
107.9	Bayern 1 (Oberbayern)	Oberammergau/Laber	0,1
107.9	R.SA (Chemnitz)	Auerbach (Vogtland)	0,1
107.9	BB Radio (Potsdam/Berlin)	Zehlendorf (Oranienburg)	5
107.9	Deutschlandfunk Kultur	Baden-Baden/Fremersberg	0,1
107.9	MDR JUMP	Bad Lobenstein/Sieglitzberg	2
