= Lingen transmitter =

Broadcasting facility in Lower Saxony, Germany

Coordinates: 52°32′06″N 7°21′11″E

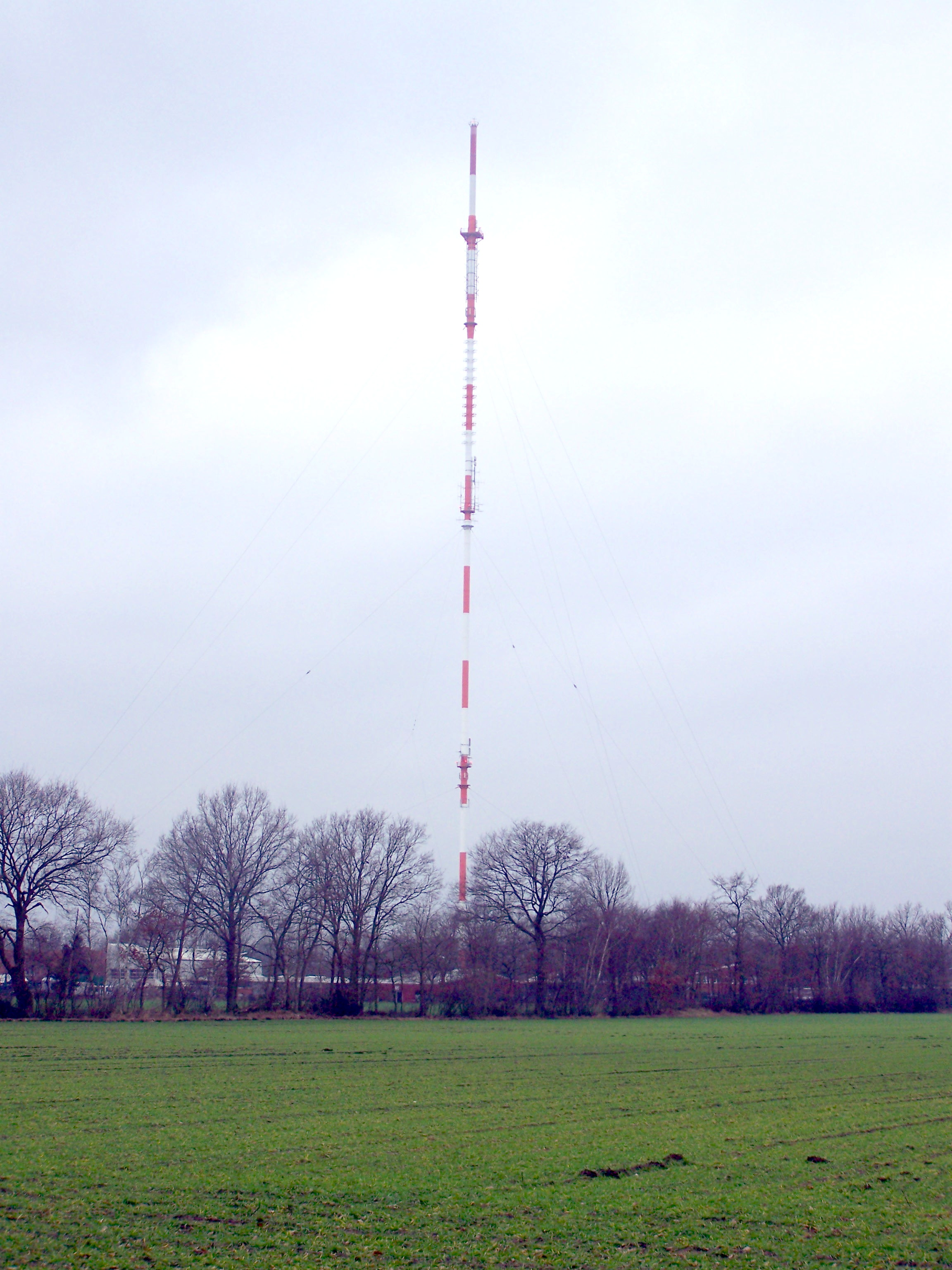
Lingen transmitter

The Lingen transmitting station is an FM radio, digital radio (DAB+) and digital television (DVB-T2) transmission facility owned by Norddeutscher Rundfunk and sited near the town of Lingen in Lower Saxony, Germany.

Its antenna is a 227 metre-high guyed grounded tubular-steel mast with a cage aerial for medium-wave broadcasting which was built in 1962.

== Services ==
The following services are being broadcast from the mast:

=== FM radio ===
Service	Frequency	ERP
NDR Info	88.9 MHz	0.2 kW
NDR Kultur	90.2 MHz	15 kW
NDR 1 Niedersachsen	92.8 MHz	15 kW
N-Joy	96.6 MHz	0.5 kW
NDR 2	97.8 MHz	15 kW
Radio ffn	101.5 MHz	12 kW
Deutschlandfunk	102.0 MHz	25 kW
Antenne Niedersachsen	104.3 MHz	12 kW
Radio 21	106.9 MHz	0.5 kW

=== Digital terrestrial television (DVB-T2) ===
Service	UHF
NDR Fernsehen Niedersachsen	37
WDR Fernsehen Köln	37
MDR Fernsehen / NDR Fernsehen Mecklenburg-Vorpommern	37
hr-fernsehen / NDR Fernsehen Hamburg	37
BR Fernsehen / NDR Fernsehen Schleswig-Holstein	37
Das Erste	41
Phoenix	41
ARTE	41
tagesschau24	41
One	41
ZDF	59
3sat	59
KiKA	59
ZDFneo	59
ZDFinfo	59

=== Digital radio (DAB+) ===
Service	VHF
Absolute relax	5C
Deutschlandfunk	5C
Deutschlandfunk Kultur	5C
Deutschlandfunk Nova	5C
Dokumente und Debatten	5C
Energy Digital	5C
ERF Plus	5C
Klassik Radio	5C
Radio Bob	5C
Radio Horeb	5C
Radio Schlagerparadies	5C
Schwarzwaldradio	5C
sunshine live	5C
NDR 1 Niedersachsen	10A
NDR 2	10A
NDR Kultur	10A
NDR Info	10A
NDR Info Spezial	10A
N-Joy	10A
NDR Blue	10A
NDR Schlager	10A

=== Former services ===
==== Medium wave ====
The NDR has shut down its medium wave transmitters, including Lingen, on 13 January 2015. Until its shutdown, it broadcast the following station:

Service	Frequency	ERP	Ceased
NDR Info Spezial (off air)	792 kHz	5 kW	13 January 2015

==== Analogue television (PAL) ====
Until the switch to DVB-T on 14 December 2005, these analogue television programmes have been transmitted:

Service	Channel	Ceased
Das Erste	24	14 December 2005
ZDF	41	14 December 2005
NDR Fernsehen Niedersachsen	59	14 December 2005
