= Flensburg-Engelsby transmitter =

Radio and television transmitter in Germany

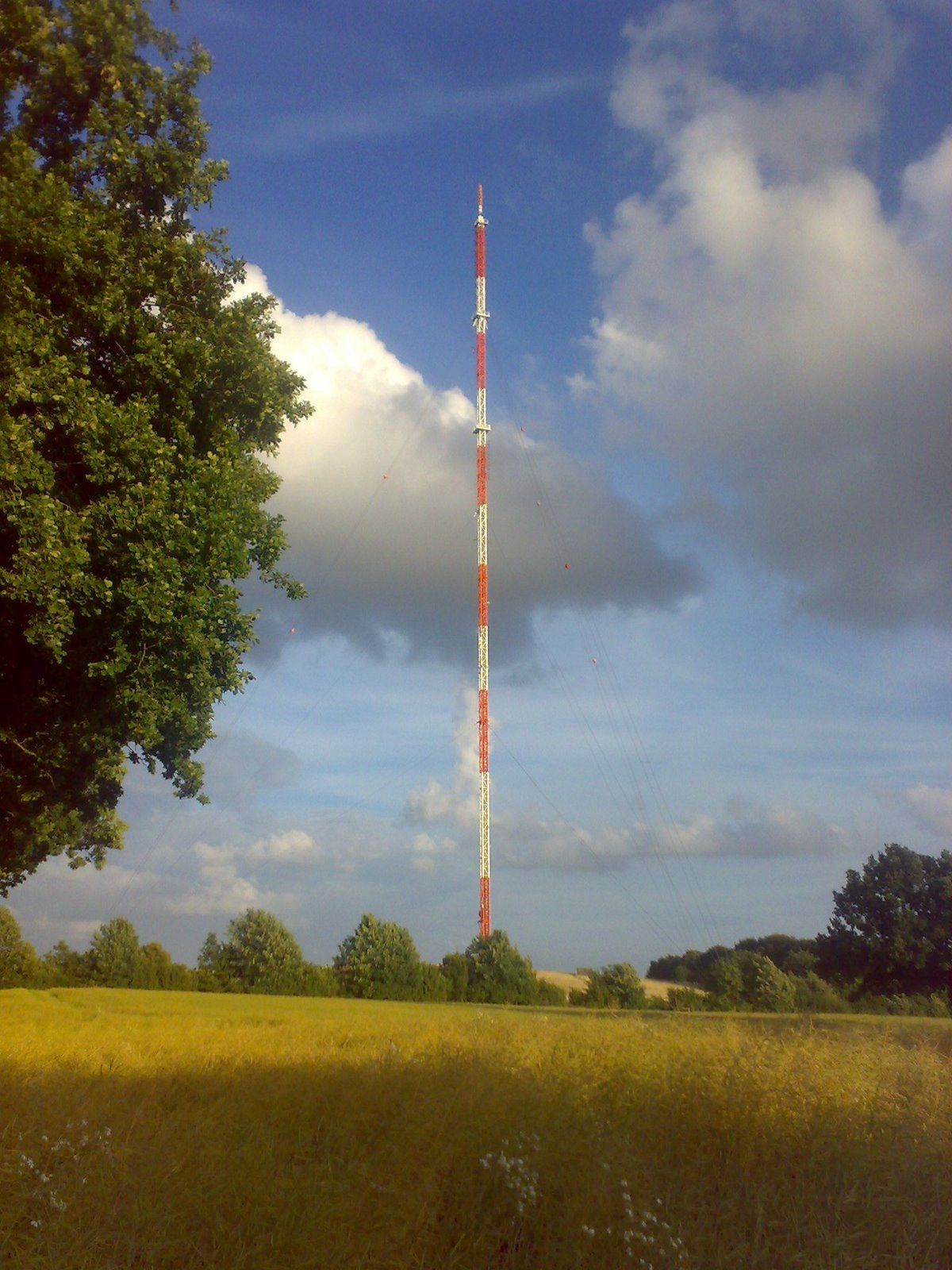
The Flensburg-Engelsby transmitter mast

The Flensburg-Engelsby transmitting station is an FM radio and digital television transmission facility owned by Norddeutscher Rundfunk and sited near the town of Flensburg in Schleswig-Holstein, Germany.

The following services are radiated from its 215-metre-high guyed grounded lattice steel mast:

== FM radio ==
Service	Frequency	ERP
NDR Info	87.7 MHz	10 kW
NDR 1 Welle Nord	89.6 MHz	25 kW
N-Joy	91.0 MHz	0.5 kW
NDR 2	93.2 MHz	25 kW
DR P1 / DR P2	94.2 MHz	0.5 kW
NDR Kultur	96.1 MHz	25 kW
DR P4	96.6 MHz	0.5 kW
DR P3	98.0 MHz	0.5 kW

== Digital terrestrial television ==
Service	UHF
ZDF	21
3sat	21
ZDFinfo	21
KiKa / ZDFneo	21
NDR Fernsehen Schleswig-Holstein	39
WDR Fernsehen Köln / NDR Fernsehen Niedersachsen	39
MDR Fernsehen Sachsen-Anhalt / NDR Fernsehen Mecklenburg-Vorpommern	39
Bayerisches Fernsehen Schwaben/Altbayern / NDR Fernsehen Hamburg	39
Das Erste	47
Phoenix	47
ARTE	47
tagesschau24	47

== History ==
The Flensburg-Engelsby transmitter is the successor of the former transmitter situated at 54°48′8″N 9°27′13″E in the city part Jürgensby, which went in service in 1928. It used as antenna tower a 92-metre (302 ft) tall wood tower, in which a fading-reducing half-wave antenna was fixed. It was one of the few functioning transmitters of Germany at the end of World War II.

In 1948 this facility transferred to NWDR, the predecessor of today's NDR. As there was not enough space for expansion at Jürgensby, the site was given up in 1957 and the wood tower was dismantled.
