= Heligoland radio tower =

Transmission tower in Germany

Coordinates: 54.180397°N 7.883282°E

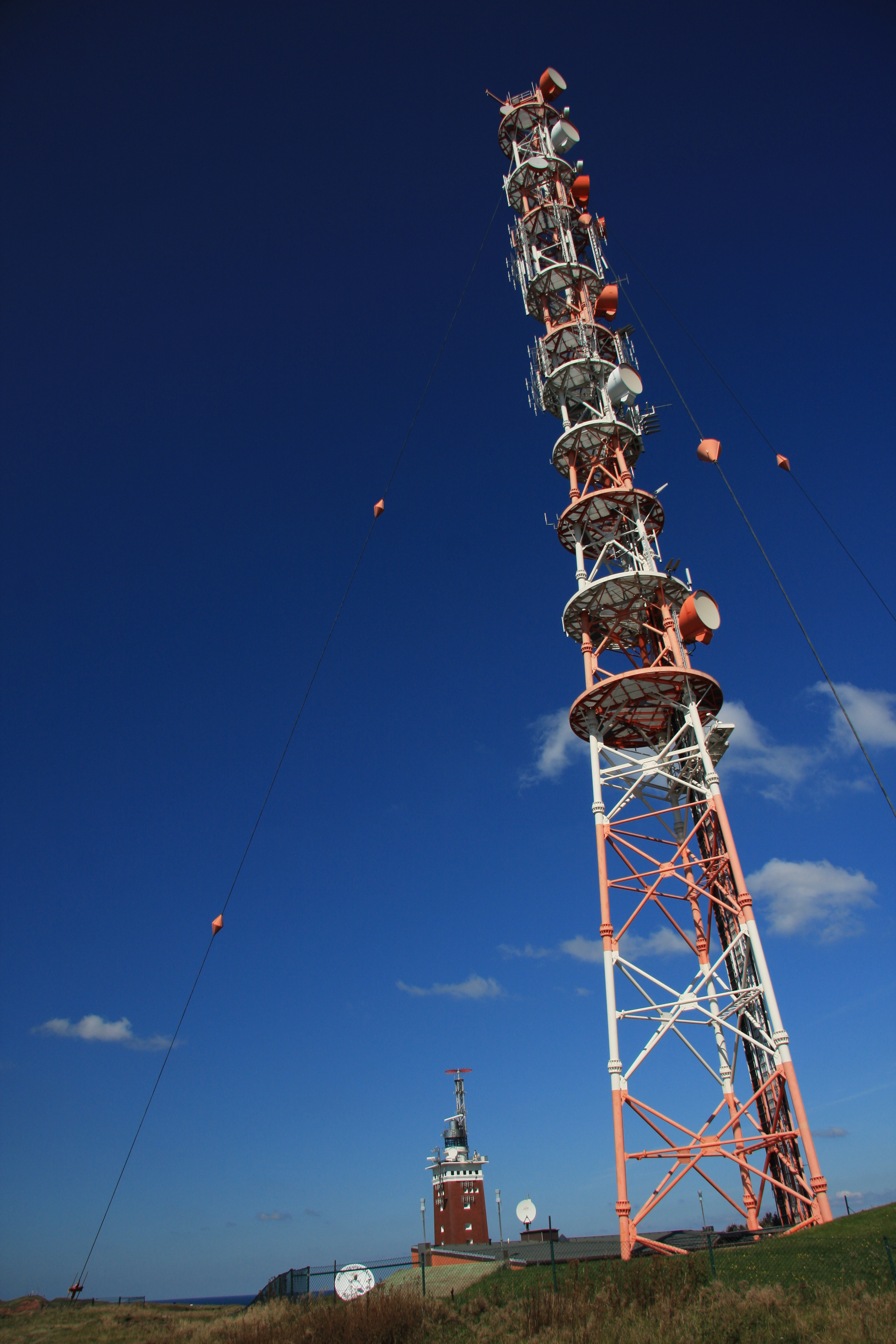
Heligoland radio tower

Heligoland radio tower is a 113-metre (371 ft) high transmission tower on the island of Heligoland in Germany. It is owned by the Deutsche Telekom. It was constructed in 2000, replacing an older, lower mast that was subsequently demolished, and has some unusual characteristics. It uses a triangular base and, despite being a free-standing tower, is supported by guy wires as well. A few months after its 2000 installation, local authorities sought the sale of municipal land on the Düne area of Heligoland island for private building and operational purposes.

Besides its use as a microwave radio relay station, it is used for transmitting radio and TV stations as well. It serves the entire island of Helgoland and is a major landmark on the island, and plays a major role in maintaining connections to the mainland. In addition, the collective of Heligoland radio tower and two other towers on the island retain a military air.

== Channels ==
- Analog radio:
  - NDR 1 Welle Nord - 88.9 MHz (10 W)
  - NDR 2 - 93.4 MHz (10 W)
  - NDR Kultur - 97.0 MHz (10 W)
  - NDR Info - 92.5 MHz (10 W)
  - N-Joy - 91.5 MHz (50 W)
  - Deutschlandfunk - 107.4 MHz (50 W)
  - Deutschlandradio Kultur - 103.0 MHz (50 W)
  - R.SH - 100.0 MHz (50 W)
  - delta radio - 104.5 MHz (50 W)
  - Radio NORA - 101.6 MHz (10 W)
  - Klassik Radio - 89.8 MHz (10 W)
- Analog television (no longer on air):
  - VHF 6 - ARD (2 W)
  - UHF 21 - ZDF (30 W)
  - UHF 23 - n-tv (30 W)
  - UHF 28 - 3sat (30 W)
  - UHF 34 - Premiere (30 W)
  - UHF 41 - Sat.1 (30 W)
  - UHF 47 - RTL Television (30 W)
  - UHF 52 - VOX (30 W)
  - UHF 54 - NDR Fernsehen (30 W)
  - UHF 56 - DSF (30 W)
  - UHF 60 - Pro7 (30 W)
- Digital television (DVB-T):
  - UHF 23 - ZDF bouquet (250 W)
  - UHF 39 - NDR bouquet (250 W)
  - UHF 47 - ARD bouquet (250 W)
