= NDR 90,3 =

- Der Radiosender für Hamburg (The radio station for Hamburg)
- Hamburg; Germany
- Broadcast area: Hamburg, Cuxhaven (Lower Saxony): FM, DAB+ National: DVB-S, DVB-C; Europe: DVB-S; Worldwide: Internet
- Frequencies: FM; 90.3 MHz (Hamburg); 98.4 MHz (Cuxhaven); DAB+ 8D (Cuxhaven); 10A (Hamburg); Satellite; Astra 1P (19.2° East) Tr. 93
- RDS: NDR_90,3

Programming
- Language: German
- Format: Oldie-based AC/Information
- Network: NDR 1

Ownership
- Owner: Norddeutscher Rundfunk
- Sister stations: NDR 1 Niedersachsen; NDR 1 Welle Nord; NDR 1 Radio MV; NDR 2 NDR Kultur; NDR Info; NDR Info Spezial; N-Joy; NDR Blue; NDR Schlager

History
- First air date: January 2, 1981
- Former names: NDR 1 Hamburg-Welle (1981-1996); NDR Hamburg-Welle 90,3 (1996-2001)

Technical information
- Transmitter coordinates: 53.576751°N 9.992205°E

Links
- Webcast: Listen Live
- Website: www.ndr.de/903/ (in German)

NDR 90,3 is a local public radio station for the German city and state of Hamburg, owned and operated by the Norddeutscher Rundfunk (NDR). Started broadcasting on January 2, 1981 as NDR 1 Hamburg-Welle, it is primarily aimed at an older audience, and focuses on a mix of German music, oldies and international hits, along with hourly news updates from Hamburg and around the world. NDR 90,3 describes itself as "feel-good radio" with reports, interviews and entertainment. On Sundays, it broadcasts the world's oldest regularly televised program, the Hamburger Hafenkonzert (Hamburg Harbor Concert).

Juliane Eisenführ was the station manager from 2008 to 2012. Since 2012, Sabine Rossbach has been the program director and director of the Hamburg regional broadcasting center. In September 2016, Hendrik Lünenborg moved from the NDR directorate to the station management of NDR 90,3. Ilka Steinhausen was editor-in-chief from 2020 to 2025. Since 2025, Anja Günther has been editor-in-chief of NDR 90,3. Until 2000, the station was called NDR Hamburg-Welle 90,3. Well-known presenters on the station include or have included Ulf Ansorge, Stephan Hensel, Carlo von Tiedemann, Maren Bockholdt, Eva Tanski and Stephan Heller.

As of 2026, NDR 90,3 has about 467,000 daily listeners.

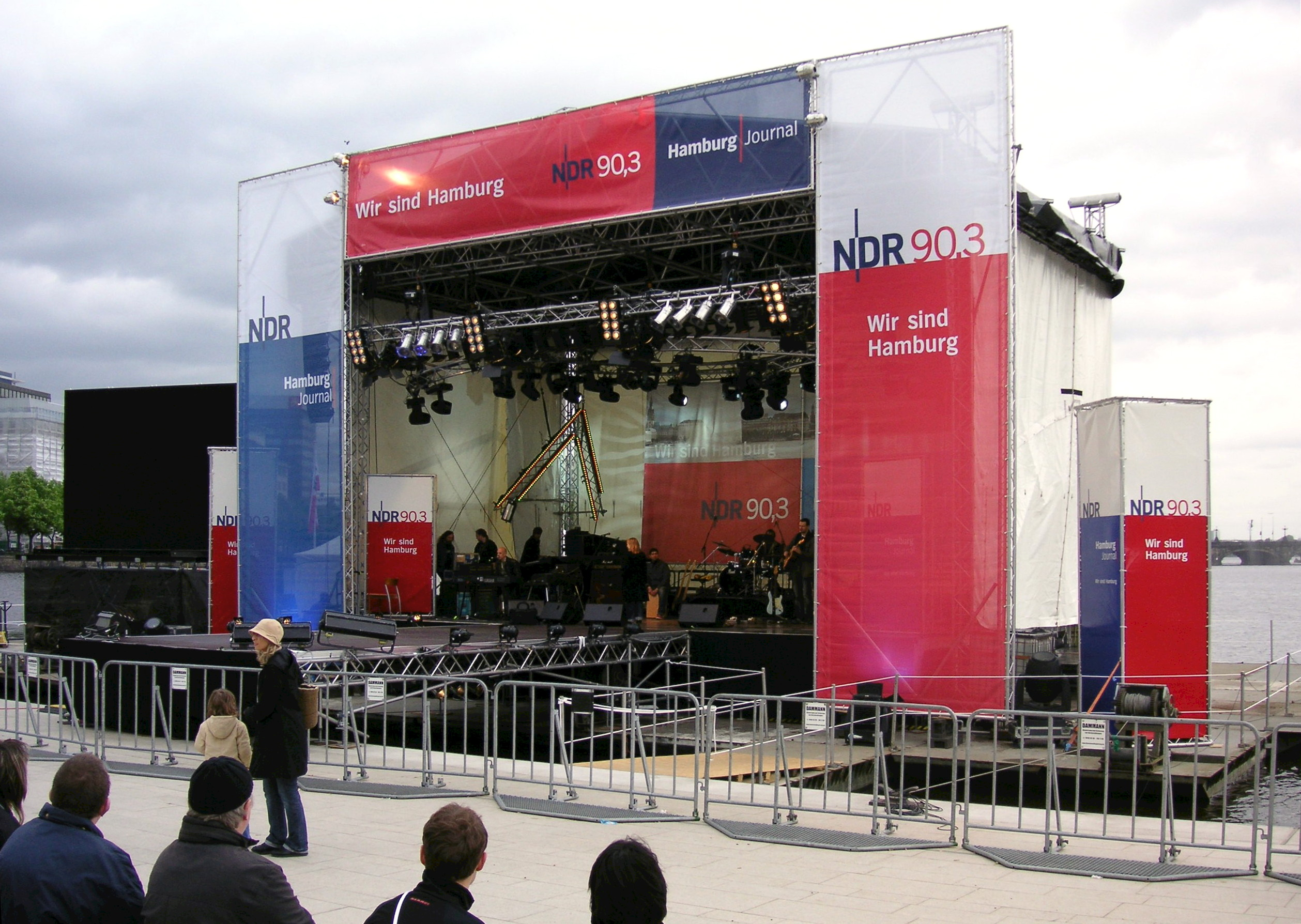
NDR 90,3 at the Jungfernstieg, Hamburg, 2006

== Music ==
In the 1990s, the music programming of the then-named Hamburg-Welle was characterized by "melodic pop and oldies music." In January 2000, the station changed its format to a "Schlager and oldies program", which consisted of 60 percent German Schlager music. Since 2012, the music programming has been rejuvenated again. Since then, 60 percent of the music has been oldies from the 60s, 70s, and 80s, along with 20 percent German-language music and 20 percent international pop. Since the summer of 2013, the station has played virtually no Schlager music.

== Listener reach ==
The Media-Analyse II/2006 revealed that NDR 90,3 had an average hourly audience of 454,000 listeners – a record result for the station. This corresponds to a daily reach of 21.9 percent. In the MA 2007/I survey, NDR 90,3 even overtook its private competitor Radio Hamburg to become the most listened-to radio station. The years 2006 and 2007 were the most successful to date for NDR 90,3. According to the MA 2009/II survey, its market share was 24.1 percent (MA 2009/I: 25 percent). This puts NDR 90,3 ahead of Radio Hamburg with 22.2 percent.

== Reception ==
The broadcasts are transmitted via FM from the NDR transmitter Hamburg-Billstedt with a transmission power of 80 kW and can be received within a radius of about 100 km. In addition, broadcasts are transmitted via the Cuxhaven transmitter on 98.4 MHz to serve the island of Neuwerk, which is part of Hamburg. Other distribution methods include DVB-S (Astra), internet live stream and, since November 22, 2011, DAB+.
