= NDR 2 =

- Genau meine Musik! (Exactly my kind of music!)
- Hamburg; Germany
- Broadcast area: Hamburg, Mecklenburg-Vorpommern, Lower Saxony, Schleswig-Holstein: FM, DAB+ National: DVB-S, DVB-C; Europe: DVB-S; Worldwide: Internet
- Frequencies: FM; 87.6 MHz (Hamburg); 89.2 MHz (Osnabrück); 90.7 MHz (Lübeck); 91.9 MHz (Bungsberg); 92.1 MHz (Torfhaus (Harz)); 92.5 MHz (Demmin); 92.6 MHz (Bad Pyrmont); 93.2 MHz (Flensburg); 93.4 MHz (Heligoland); 93.5 MHz (Rostock-Toitenwinkel); 93.6 MHz (Alfeld); 93.7 MHz (Goslar); 94.0 MHz (Heringsdorf); 94.1 MHz (Göttingen); 95.9 MHz (Visselhövede); 96.0 MHz (Holzminden); 96.1 MHz (Hann. Münden); 96.2 MHz (Hanover); 96.3 MHz (Heide); 96.4 MHz (Dannenberg); 97.8 MHz (Lingen); 97.9 MHz (Cuxhaven); 98.1 MHz (Aurich); 98.3 MHz (Kiel); 98.5 MHz (Schwerin); 98.7 MHz (Sylt); 99.1 MHz (Helpterberg); 99.8 MHz (Rügen); 99.8 MHz (Steinkimmen); 102.6 MHz (Stadthagen); 107.0 MHz (Röbel); DAB+ 6C (Braunschweig); 6C (Oldenburg); 7A (Hanover); 8B (Greifswald); 8D (Cuxhaven); 9A (Lübeck); 9B (Lüneburg); 9C (Kiel); 10A (Hamburg); 10A (Osnabrück); 10C (Neubrandenburg); 10C (Norderstedt); 11B (Heide); 11B (Rostock); 11D (Pasewalk); 12B (Flensburg); 12B (Schwerin); Satellite; Astra 1H (19.2° East) Tr. 39
- RDS: _NDR_2__

Programming
- Language: German
- Format: Current-based AC/Full-service radio

Ownership
- Owner: Norddeutscher Rundfunk
- Sister stations: NDR 90,3; NDR 1 Niedersachsen; NDR 1 Welle Nord; NDR 1 Radio MV; NDR Kultur; NDR Info; NDR Info Spezial; N-Joy; NDR Blue; NDR Schlager

History
- First air date: January 1, 1956

Technical information
- Transmitter coordinates: 53.576751°N 9.992205°E

Links
- Webcast: Listen Live
- Website: www.ndr.de/ndr2 (in German)

NDR 2 is a German, public radio station by the Norddeutscher Rundfunk (NDR) focusing on contemporary pop and rock music for an adult audience. It is the only NDR radio station that broadcasts advertising. The headquarters is in Hamburg. Melanie Lidsba has been the head of NDR 2 since August 2026; prior to that, the role was held by Torsten Engel. Program director is Ilka Steinhausen.

As of 2026, NDR 2 has more than two million daily listeners.

== History ==
Historic logo until 2001

NDR 2 started broadcasting on January 1, 1956 and emerged from the radio station NWDR Nord, which had begun broadcasting on April 30, 1950. On January 2, 1981, NDR 2 broadcast its first advertising block. Previously, the NDR was prohibited from broadcasting radio advertising.

=== Nighttime programming ===
During the night hours, NDR 2 broadcast a joint ARD program until 1990. Initially, this was the ARD-Nachtexpress (ARD night express); from the mid-1980s, it was the ARD-Nachtrock (ARD night rock) and since 1990, it has been the ARD-Popnacht (ARD pop night). Since Nachtrock and Popnacht did not yet fill the entire nighttime gap at that time, NDR 2 also occasionally broadcast programming from SWF3 (including the shows Lollipop and Popfit) from Baden-Baden.

On January 1, 1991, NDR 2 withdrew from the ARD nighttime programming and began producing its own 24-hour schedule with the program NDR 2-Nacht (NDR 2 night) during the night hours. Between 2011 and 2018, NDR 2-Nacht was also broadcast on WDR 2. Since January 17, 2018, as part of a restructuring of the nighttime programming, NDR 2 has once again been broadcasting the ARD-Popnacht, now broadcast daily by the Südwestrundfunk and produced by SWR3.

Since January 2, 2025, NDR 2 has been broadcasting the ARD-wide evening program in addition to Popnacht. "Pop. Die Abendshow" (Pop. The Evening Show), also produced by SWR3, airs daily from 9:00 p.m. Another new feature is that NDR 2's jingles are played both in the evening and at night, even though the program is also broadcast on other stations simultaneously.

=== Daytime programming ===
NDR 2, as an entertainment and service station, always aimed to appeal to a broad audience with its programming. Until the early 1990s, German Schlager music could be heard in the daytime programming alongside international pop music. The cornerstones of its informational programming, besides the hourly news followed by the NDR-Verkehrsstudio (NDR traffic reports), were the morning, midday, and evening news bulletins, which were characterized by a high proportion of spoken content. Weekday entertainment programs included "NDR2 am Vormittag" (NDR 2 in the morningj, "Radioboulevard" in the early afternoon, and "Espresso" in the late afternoon. At midday, the record collection program "Plattenkiste" (Record Crate) was broadcast. The evening programming targeted a younger audience and featured rock music not typically heard during the day. Programs like "Der Club" (The club) and "Club Extra" were notable examples. The weekly daytime program concluded with "Traumhaft" (Dreamlike), a program featuring light pop music. On Saturday afternoons, the program "Spielzeit" (Game Time) aired, followed by "Sport aktuell - Berichte von der Fußball-Bundesliga" (Sports News - reports from the Bundesliga), which also included the ARD conference coverage. Saturday evening programs included the "Internationale Hitparade " (International Hit Parade, later "Club Hitparade") and "Traumhaft - Oldies zum Tanzen" (Dreamlike - Oldies for Dancing). In the summer, there were also live broadcasts of "Saturday Night Disco". "Zwischen Hamburg und Haiti" (Between Hamburg and Haiti) aired on NDR 2 on Sunday mornings, followed at midday by "Oldies nach Wunsch" (Oldies by Request); in the 1980s, the afternoon lineup included the "Schlagerparade" or the "Klopfer des Nordens" (Knockers of the North), a chart show. In the mid-1990s, the afternoon schedule was restructured; the daily comedy show "Kwatsch", hosted by Uwe Bahn, Ulf Ansorge and Carlo von Tiedemann, aired between 1:00 p.m. and 2:00 p.m. The program "Traumhaft" was renamed " Club nach zehn" (Club After Ten). The "World-Chart-Show" was broadcast on Sunday evenings.

In 1997, virtually all formats were standardized, and from then on there were no more special programs, comedy shows, or chart shows, but rather a 24/7 mix of international and national pop music. From 1998 onwards, the presenters hosted the program slots on a weekly rotation—previously, different presenters had been in the studio each day, except for the morning show. The last major programming overhaul took place in 2001. New presenters hosted the daily schedule; additionally, the magazine programs "Mittagskurier" and "Abendkurier" were transformed from 60-minute magazine shows into an extended 12-minute news broadcast. Since this change, the program structure has remained largely unchanged. Since 2025, NDR 2 has broadcast a joint ARD-wide evening program.

== Presenters ==
Unlike in its early days, NDR 2 now relies almost exclusively on presenters who previously worked for commercial stations (e.g. R.SH, Radio Hamburg, Radio ffn, and Antenne Bayern). Most presenters remain on NDR 2 for a maximum of ten years , as they work as freelancers for the NDR, whose contracts are limited to a maximum of 15 years.

=== Current ===
- Elke Wiswedel and Jens Mahrhold host Der NDR 2 Morgen mit Elke und Jens (The NDR 2 Morning Show with Elke and Jens) (Mon-Fri 5-10 am).
- Holger Ponik hosts NDR 2 Vormittag mit Holger (NDR 2 Morning Show with Holger) (Mon-Fri 10am-2pm).
- Jessica Müller and Jens Hardeland host Der NDR 2 Nachmittag mit Jessica und Hardeland (The NDR 2 Afternoon Show with Jessica and Hardeland) (Mon-Fri 2-6pm).
- Dirk Böge, Jonas Frank, Kathrin Hammer, Henrik Hanses, Tina Padberg, Nikolai Russ, Christopher Scheffelmeier, Maren Sieber and Sascha Sommer take turns hosting the NDR 2 Soundcheck Neue Musik (NDR 2 Soundcheck New Music) (Mon–Wed and Fri 6–9pm) and on weekends.
- Peter Urban hosts the Peter Urban Show (for decades on Thursday evenings from 9pm, since 2025 every Wednesday from 6pm to 9pm).
- Martin Roschitz, Christian Haacke and Moritz Cassalette take turns hosting the NDR 2 Bundesligashow (Sat 3-6 pm) and the NDR-2-Sonntag (NDR 2 Sunday) (different broadcast times on Sunday afternoon).
- Kathrin Schlass, Julia Meier and André Schünke are the main presenters of the "O-Ton-Nachrichten" (Mon–Fri on the hour between 6am and 6pm, as well as Mon-Fri at 5:30, 6:30, 7:30 and 8:30 am) and the NDR 2 Update (daily at 12pm and Mon–Fri also at 5pm); the central NDR radio news bulletins are broadcast from 7pm to 5am and all day on weekends.

=== Former ===
- Lutz Ackermann
- Jan Malte Andresen
- Uwe Bahn
- Gabi Bauer
- Hinnerk Baumgarten
- Sabine Christiansen
- Wilken F. Dincklage (†)
- Günter Fink (†)
- Stefan Frech
- Anke Genius
- Wolfgang Hahn
- Ulli Harraß
- Eva Herman
- Monika Jetter
- Reinhold Kujawa (†)
- Stefan Kuna
- Ilka Petersen
- Ilse Rehbein (†)
- Ruth Rockenschaub
- Brigitte Rohkohl
- Wolf-Dieter Stubel (†)
- Gert Timmermann (†)
- Carlo von Tiedemann (†)

== Programming ==
=== Programming schedule ===
NDR 2 broadcasts 24 hours a day. The daytime program is divided into morning, late morning, afternoon and evening. The schedule includes music specials from 6:00 p.m. to 9:00 p.m. Afterwards, "Pop - Die Abendshow" and the "ARD-Popnacht" from SWR3 are broadcast. News broadcasts (updates) lasting approximately eight minutes are broadcast daily at 12:00 p.m., as well as at 5:00 p.m. from Monday to Friday. On weekends, the Bundesliga show (Saturdays from 3:00 p.m. to 6:00 p.m.) with Christian Haacke, Martin Roschitz or Moritz Cassalette stands out from the rest of the programming. NDR 2 is broadcast live around the clock, every day. Since the takeover of the ARD-Popnacht from the SWR, the NDR 2 morning show is also broadcast entirely live; previously, some segments were pre-recorded between 5:00 and 5:30 a.m.

=== Music ===
NDR 2 plays current pop music as well as music from the last 30 years. The evening Soundcheck music programs focus on the following topics: live recordings, the German music scene, newly released music, party music and easy listening.

From the beginning of June 2010 until the beginning of September 2021, NDR 2 used the dynamic RDS PS function via the RDS service to transmit the song being played and the corresponding artist. According to the station, this function was discontinued because it frequently resulted in incorrect information.

=== Comedy ===
A well-known series from the 1990s is Neues aus Stenkelfeld (News from Stenkelfeld), written by Detlev Gröning and Harald Wehmeier. From 2002 to 2005, Elmar Brandt's Gerdshow aired on NDR 2. Afterwards, the comedy show Machtschwester Angela (Power Sister Angela) by Anne Onken was broadcast. From 2003 to 2009, Harald Wehmeier's Münte aktuell (Münte news) was broadcast. From 2008 to 2013, Frühstück bei Stefanie (Breakfast at Stefanie), written by Wehmeier and Andreas Altenburg, was broadcast. The program was discontinued because Wehmeier left the NDR, where he had been a staff editor. As its successor, Udo Martens - so seh' ich es (Udo Martens - That's How I See It) was broadcast on Fridays from September 6, 2013 until August 1, 2014. From September 8, 2014 to June 3, 2022, the radio comedy show Wir sind die Freeses (We are the Freeses) was broadcast, and its animated spin-off, Freese 1 an alle (Freese 1 to all), ran weekly starting summer 2015. NDR 2 has been broadcasting Die Kur-Oase (The Spa Oasis) since September 2023. Andreas Altenburg has been the writer responsible for all comedy segments since Frühstück bei Stefanie.

== Reception ==
The station's broadcast area comprises Lower Saxony, Hamburg, Schleswig-Holstein and Mecklenburg-Vorpommern. Within this broadcast area and in adjacent regions, the station can be received via FM and cable. On June 1, 2011, the NDR discontinued its DAB broadcast, as the station has been available via DAB+ since November 22, 2011.

NDR 2 is also available across Europe via Astra (DVB-S) and worldwide via the internet (live stream).

== NDR 2 Plus ==
Logo of the DAB offshoot

A slightly modified version of NDR 2 was available on digital radio (DAB) from May 2008 until the end of August 2010 under the name NDR 2 Plus. Unlike the regular station, NDR 2 Plus was the only NDR station to broadcast the ARD-Popnacht. From September 2010, the NDR initially resumed broadcasting its main station, NDR 2, on digital radio, but then completely discontinued the broadcast on June 1, 2011.

== Miscellaneous ==
Marc Bator was the station voice of NDR 2 from 2001 until June 30, 2013, and also regularly regularly read the news for Tagesschau until the end of April 2013. Markus Kästle is Bator's successor.
