= N-Joy (German radio station) =

N-JOY
- Enjoy the music
- Hamburg; Germany
- Broadcast area: Hamburg, Mecklenburg-Vorpommern, Lower Saxony, Schleswig-Holstein: FM, DAB+ National: DVB-S, DVB-C; Europe: DVB-S; Worldwide: Internet
- Frequencies: FM; 88.8 MHz (Garding); 88.9 MHz (Rostock-Toitenwinkel); 89.5 MHz (Neubrandenburg); 90.9 MHz (Mölln); 91.0 MHz (Flensburg); 91.2 MHz (Bad Rothenfelde); 91.3 MHz (Stadthagen); 91.4 MHz (Rosengarten); 91.5 MHz (Heligoland and Niebüll); 91.6 MHz (Cuxhaven); 92.3 MHz (Heringsdorf); 92.5 MHz (Papenburg); 92.6 MHz (Hanover); 92.7 MHz (Aurich); 92.8 MHz (Schiffdorf); 92.9 MHz (Alfeld and Steinkimmen); 93.0 MHz (Braunschweig); 93.2 MHz (Wolgast); 93.3 MHz (Meppen); 93.4 MHz (Bad Bentheim); 93.5 MHz (Cloppenburg); 93.7 MHz (Hamelin and Husum); 94.0 MHz (Dannenberg and Lübeck); 94.2 MHz (Hamburg and Bad Pyrmont); 94.4 MHz (Malchin); 94.5 MHz (Kiel); 94.8 MHz (Hann. Münden and Pasewalk); 94.9 MHz (Heide); 95.0 MHz (Barth); 95.1 MHz (Demmin); 95.5 MHz (Rügen); 95.6 MHz (Sylt and Wedel); 95.7 MHz (Hildesheim); 95.9 MHz (Göttingen); 96.1 MHz (Braunlage); 96.4 MHz (Osnabrück); 96.5 MHz (Goslar); 96.6 MHz (Lingen and Seesen); 97.3 MHz (Wilhelmshaven); 97.4 MHz (Röbel); 97.6 MHz (Visselhövede); 98.7 MHz (Neumünster); 99.0 MHz (Bungsberg); 99.3 MHz (Nienburg/Weser); 99.4 MHz (Marlow); 99.5 MHz (Schwerin); 99.6 MHz (Stade); 99.7 MHz (Holzminden); 99.8 MHz (Lauenburg); 100.1 MHz (Lüneburg); 103.0 MHz (Anklam); 103.2 MHz (Helpterberg); 103.4 MHz (Klütz/Hamberge); 103.7 MHz (Bad Doberan); 104.1 MHz (Ueckermünde); 104.4 MHz (Güstrow); 105.0 MHz (Damme); 105.2 MHz (Rinteln-Strücken); DAB+ 6C (Braunschweig); 6C (Oldenburg); 7A (Hanover); 8B (Greifswald); 8D (Cuxhaven); 9A (Lübeck); 9B (Lüneburg); 9C (Kiel); 10A (Hamburg); 10A (Osnabrück); 10C (Neubrandenburg); 10C (Norderstedt); 11B (Heide); 11B (Rostock); 11D (Pasewalk); 12B (Flensburg); 12B (Schwerin); Satellite; Astra 1KR/1L/1M/1N (19.2° East) Tr. 93

Programming
- Language: German
- Format: Contemporary hit radio

Ownership
- Owner: Norddeutscher Rundfunk
- Sister stations: NDR 90,3; NDR 1 Niedersachsen; NDR 1 Welle Nord; NDR 1 Radio MV; NDR 2 NDR Kultur; NDR Info; NDR Info Spezial; NDR Blue; NDR Schlager

History
- First air date: April 4, 1994

Technical information
- Transmitter coordinates: 53.576751°N 9.992205°E

Links
- Webcast: Listen Live
- Website: ndr.de/n-joy (in German)

N-Joy (stylized as N-JOY) is a German public radio station by the Norddeutscher Rundfunk (NDR) made for listeners with an age between 14 and 39. The headquarters is in Hamburg. Program director is Melanie Lidsba since November 2020.

N-Joy's actual program is dominated by charts oriented music, interviews with musicians and unplugged songs. The station does not broadcast any advertisements.

The listeners have the possibility to offer music wishes and to communicate with the presenters via e-mail, social media, and via telephone. The listeners also have the chance to get tickets for "secret concerts" (not public planned concerts of musicians with less security and less visitors). As of 2026, N-Joy has more than 1.11 million daily listeners.

== History ==
=== Beginnings ===
Historic logo until 2001

On April 4, 1994 at 4:44 pm, the NDR launched N-Joy, then still under the name N-Joy Radio (until 2001), as a radio station for a young audience. The first song played on N-Joy was "Look Who's Talking" by Dr. Alban. The presenters for the launch were Cyrus Sadri and Thomas Bug. The studios in Hamburg also marked a German premiere. They managed without CD players in the control rooms, as the music was stored digitally in electronic jukeboxes (at that time PC-based). N-Joy's studio was the first radio studio in Germany to use this technology. The first broadcasters in Europe to use this technology were Blue Danube Radio and FM4 from the Österreichischer Rundfunk (ORF). The studios in Hamburg and Vienna were planned and built by the same companies.

The station was also intended as a reaction to private station, particularly in Hamburg (OK Radio), which were increasingly causing listeners to migrate away from NDR and the then "youngest" radio station NDR 2. N-Joy was intended to replace the youth magazine Der Club, which had been broadcast on NDR 2 since 1969. In the radio program listings of some television magazines (e.g. Hörzu or Funk Uhr), this station was initially listed under the working title "NDR 5". Two weeks prior, N-Joy advertised its program in a music hold loop on its then new frequency with the slogan: "N-Joy Radio starts on 4. 4. at 4:44 am". The station's studio and editorial offices were initially located in Bebelallee in Hamburg-Winterhude, separate from the rest of NDR radio. The physical separation from the other NDR stations was intentional, as the youth station did not want to submit to the outdated NDR image. In 2004, N-Joy moved to a new building at the headquarters on the Rothenbaumchaussee in Hamburg-Harvestehude, joining the other NDR radio stations.

A defining feature of the program in the early years was the station's early morning programming, which bore the name "Morgencrew" (Morning crew). It was moderated by two rotating moderators and a sidekick, as well as the news team, which also consisted of two people. For a time (from 1996 to 1999) the station was also broadcast on television (N3, now NDR Fernsehen) under the name "N-Joy Breakfast TV". Live images were broadcast from the studio, allowing viewers to see presenters, such as Anja Goerz and Thomas Bug, at work. However, the basic idea of continuously feeding radio into television broadcasts simultaneously did not last and was rarely adopted by other stations. The "Morgencrew" was last broadcast on television on March 26, 1999, and ended with a hint of a return in October. However, this did not happen.

The "N-Joy Radio Charts", which aired every Sunday from 10 am to 2 pm, was also popular. These charts featured the 40 most requested songs of the previous week. In addition, correspondents provided the latest charts from the United Kingdom and the USA. This made it possible to discover current music trends long before the tracks were released in Germany.

The show "N-Joy the Party" achieved cult status on Saturday evening. It was hosted by two presenters who goofed around on air for hours and played current party hits. The broadcast also included a party booking service where listeners could call and leave their phone number. Games played with listeners on the phone were also part of the broadcast.

A regular feature of the daily program was the radio comedy show "Käpt'n Kip Dotter", which was taken over from SWF3 and mainly parodied Star Trek and other science fiction clichés. The captain was voiced by Elmar Hörig, who was a presenter on SWF3 and later Sat.1. The comedy always began with the phrase: "And now: The biggest bang in the universe..."

According to Media-Analyse from 1997, around 48.2 percent of 14- to 19-year-old listeners tuned in to the station once a day.

In June 1999, the station underwent a comprehensive relaunch, replacing almost all of its familiar programs. Instead of the "Morgencrew" with various presenters, the later program director Norbert Grundei was given his own morning show called "Guten Norbert". The station's afternoon programming was also now presented by fixed teams of presenters. The popular party show on Saturday evenings was cancelled and will now be presented by only one host. The listener charts, which were previously broadcast for four hours, have been shortened to three hours and given the new name "30:3".

With the relaunch, the station's sound design also changed drastically and became much calmer. Instead of the previous station's voice Umut Dirik, the jingles were now recorded by Ramon Montana. In 2001, the station introduced a new logo. With this, the word "Radio" was also removed from the station's name.

In the following years, the station was particularly shaped by presenters Andreas Kuhlage and Jens Hardeland. As early as the 2000s, they both presented N-Joy's morning show. After a break between 2008 and 2011, the duo returned to the early morning slot and remained with the station until mid-2022. Following the departure of Andreas Kuhlage and Jens Hardeland, several changes were made to the programming. The daytime schedule, in particular, was restructured. While the daytime schedule consisted of five shows between 5 am and 10 pm until mid-2022, this was reduced to four shows between 6 am and 9 pm. The next major change came in April 2023 with the departure of Christian Haacke, long-time presenter of N-Joy's afternoon show. His successor was Anne Raddatz, the previous presenter of N-Joy's midday show. Since then, Saskia Neumann and Ronja Tiede have alternated weekly as hosts of N-Joy's midday show.

==== Music programming ====
In the 1990s, the station's music programming was often described as unique. "Back then, market researchers always said, 'There's really no such thing as a station like yours'", said long-time program director Norbert Grundei to the RedaktionsNetzwerk Deutschland on the occasion of the station's 30th anniversary. Besides some extremely fast-paced dance and happy hardcore songs, N-Joy also played a mix of hip-hop and rock songs as well as boy band ballads. Grundei says they "radically played everything that was popular". This also distinguished N-Joy from other ARD youth radio stations like Fritz or 1LIVE, which had their roots more in indie rock. This in turn led to N-Joy achieving cult status even outside of Northern Germany. "Even when I was on a skiing holiday in Austria, N-Joy was playing in the mountain huts back then", said Grundei.

With the major programming relaunch in 1999, the music programming was broadened. While dance music, which had previously dominated, remained present, it played a less prominent role. From 2004 onwards, N-Joy removed almost all dance tracks from its programming and followed the general music trend: German rock acts such as Revolverheld, Juli, Bosse and Silbermond were henceforth overrepresented in the daytime programming. It wasn't until the renewed boom in electronic music from the beginning of the 2010s that dance tracks returned to the program.

In 2001, N-Joy launched the program "N-Joy Osternasen" (N-Joy Easter Noses), which has been broadcast annually from Holy Saturday to Easter Monday ever since. During this time, only music requests are fulfilled. This also allows for the inclusion of artists who are not played in the regular programming – including numerous tracks from the station's early years.

=== Present ===
Unlike in previous years, the NDR no longer refers to the station as a youth station. N-Joy now targets the demographic of 14 to 39 year olds. At the station's launch, this demographic was stated as 14 to 20 year olds.

The station offers up-to-date information and interaction with listeners in its daily programming. The latter include the "Morningshow Duel", the "Open Mic Week", the "Throwback Battle", and the "Mashup Monday/Wednesday". However, the amount of spoken content in the programming is rather small. The news on N-Joy is broadcast every half hour in the morning (6 to 9 am) and afternoon (4 to 7 pm), and hourly during the day. The music played on N-Joy is based on current chart hits. Occasionally, tracks from the recent past are also featured. The station's slogan/claim is "Enjoy the Music".

==== Daily programming ====
With the departure of Andreas Kuhlage and Jens Hardeland, N-Joy changed its broadcast schedule from 4 shows between 5 am and 7 pm to 3 shows between 6 am and 6 pm.

The daily program from Monday to Friday is structured as follows:

- Euer N-Joy Warm-up (Your N-Joy Warm-up) (5 am to 6 am, unhosted)
- Eure N-Joy Morningshow mit Martina und Greg (Your N-Joy Morning Show with Martina and Greg) (6 am to 10 am) with Martina Schönherr and Greg Bogowicz
- Euer N-Joy Mittag mit (Your N-Joy Lunch with) Ronja / Saskia (10 am to 2 pm) with Ronja Thiede or Saskia Neumann
- Euer N-Joy Nachmittag mit Anne (Your N-Joy Afternoon with Anne) (2 pm to 6 pm) with Anne Raddatz (Mon - Thu)
- N-Joy Play (Mondays to Fridays, 6 pm to 9 pm, various presenters)

On Monday evenings from 22:00 to 0:00, the format "Deutschrap ideal", developed by You FM for YouTube, produced by Hessischer Rundfunk and moderated by Simon Vogt, has been running since January 6, 2025.

On Mondays from 9 pm to 10 pm, and Tuesdays to Thursdays from 9 pm to midnight, an unhosted playlist called "N-Joy - Enjoy the Music" is played.

On Fridays, from 9 to 10 pm, "N-Joy Club" with Christian Lidsba is broadcast, featuring current electronic music. This is followed by the show "N-Joy Residents" from 10 pm to midnight, featuring various DJ mixes.

The weekend program is generally as follows:

- Saturday, 6 am to 8 am: N-Joy - Enjoy the Music (unhosted)
- Saturday, 8 am to 6 pm: N-Joy Weekend with various presenters
- Saturday, 6 pm to 8 pm: N-Joy Der beste Abend der Woche (N-Joy The best evening of the week) with various presenters
- Saturday, 8 pm to 10 pm: N-Joy Residents with various DJs
- Saturday, 10 pm to 1 am: Der Beste Abend der Woche (The Best Night of the Week) - Playlist" (unhosted)
- Sunday, 6 pm to 8 am: N-Joy - Enjoy the Music (unhosted)
- Sunday, 8 am to 10 am: Best-of der N-Joy Morningshow mit Martina & Greg (Best of the N-Joy Morning Show with Martina & Greg)
- Sunday, 10 am to 2 pm: N-Joy - Nur für die Ehre (Just for the Honor) with various presenters
- Sunday, 2 pm to 6 pm N-Joy Weekend with various presenters
- Sunday, 6 pm to 8 pm: N-Joy - Enjoy the Music (unhosted)
- Sunday, 8 pm to 9 pm: N-Joy Weltweit (N-Joy Worldwide) with various presenters
- Sunday, 9 pm to 10 pm: Flexikon – a podcast by hosts Steffi Banowski and Anne Raddatz
- Sunday, 10 pm to 12 am: N-Joy - Enjoy the Music (unhosted)

During the night, N-Joy broadcasts "Die junge Nacht der ARD" (The young night of ARD). This is a joint late-night program from the ARD's youth radio stations. The program is produced by 1LIVE in Cologne. "Die junge Nacht der ARD" replaced the unhosted N-Joy Nacht (N-Joy Night) in mid-2018. The program can currently be heard on N-Joy at the following times:

- Monday – Friday, 12 am to 5 am
- Saturday and Sunday, 1 am to 6 am

Other presenters are Svenja Böhm, Alex Franz, Julia Hercka, Lars Holzhüter, Sabine Lebek, Moritz Maaß, Jonas Menke, Dennis Pöring, Insa Struve and Tim Winterscheid.

As an interaction option, the station offers the free N-Joy app for iOS and Android, a messenger service through which text messages, voice messages, and images can be sent directly and in real time to the station's community management and presenters. The N-Joy app was officially released in July 2016.

== Reception ==
N-Joy can be received via FM and DAB+ in Schleswig-Holstein, Lower Saxony, Mecklenburg-Vorpommern, Hamburg and Bremen, as well as parts of Brandenburg, Hesse, North Rhine-Westphalia, Saxony-Anhalt, Thuringia, the Netherlands, Denmark and Poland. It can also be heard worldwide via the Internet as an MP3 stream and via the Phonostar player. In Europe, N-Joy can be received via DVB-S. Analog satellite reception on an audio subcarrier of the pay-TV channel Premiere was discontinued when Premiere ended its analog satellite broadcasts.

At the start of broadcasting in 1994, N-Joy's FM coverage was far from comprehensive, as there were not enough frequencies available and some of the frequencies had previously been intended for the introduction of local radio services and were therefore only designed for lower transmission power. For this reason, N-Joy was initially broadcast in the Schleswig-Flensburg district via medium wave on 702 kHz from 6 a.m. to 7 p.m., while at other times NDR 4 (now NDR Info) could be received on this frequency. Later, the service was expanded and, although it still uses lower transmission power than other NDR radio services, it is nowadays provided with more transmitter sites. However, N-Joy can only achieve the high reception quality of the other NDR programs in the immediate vicinity of the transmitter sites. For example, the situation in Schleswig-Holstein: Until the beginning of 2012, the strongest transmitter site was located in Kronshagen near Kiel with a power of 15 kW (ERP) on the frequency 94.5 MHz, while the power of the other transmitters was only 0.2 kW to 5 kW. The Kiel site is therefore the only main network transmitter in Schleswig-Holstein. The situation in Lower Saxony, Hamburg and Mecklenburg-Vorpommern was similar. To improve reception in the area between Hamburg, Hanover and Bremen, a new frequency with 30 kW transmission power was therefore taken over from BFBS R1 at the Visselhövede transmission tower (Rotenburg (Wümme) district) on January 4, 2012. Since then, 400,000 more households have been able to receive N-Joy without interference. Since January 2016, N-Joy has also operated on the powerful 93.0 MHz frequency with 40 kW in the Braunschweig area.

The station launched on November 22, 2011 via DAB+.

From mid-May 2010 to early September 2021, N-Joy still relied on the dynamic RDS-PS function via the RDS service, thus transmitting the song being played and the corresponding artist. According to the company, this function was discontinued due to frequent errors.

The state of Schleswig-Holstein and the private and public radio broadcasters have agreed to switch from FM to DAB+ by 2031. This will first affect the small town of Niebüll and the surrounding area, where N-Joy will only be available via DAB+ from April 9, 2025. The island of Heligoland is slated to follow in 2026, and Garding and Husum in 2027. In addition, the power output of the NDR's FM transmitters will be reduced.

== Awards ==
- Deutscher Radiopreis (German Radio Award) in the category "Beste Sendung" (Best Show) in 2014 for the N-Joy Kanzlercheck (N-Joy Chancellor Check) for the 2013 German federal election
- Deutscher Radiopreis in the category "Beste Morgensendung" (Best Morning Show) in 2015 for Andreas Kuhlage and Jens Hardeland with the N-Joy Morningshow
- Deutscher Radiopreis in the category "Beste Programmaktion" (Best Program Campaign) in 2016 for the Hamburger Radiobündnis gegen Fremdenhass – für Toleranz und Mitmenschlichkeit (Hamburg Radio Alliance against xenophobia – for tolerance and humanity)
- Deutscher Radiopreis in the category "Beste Programmaktion" (Best Program Campaign) in 2017 for Kopf hoch. Das Handy kann warten. (Keep your chin up. Your phone can wait)
- Deutscher Radiopreis in the category "Beste Innovation" (Best Innovation) in 2018 for Norbert Grundei and Mirko Marquardt with the N-Joy Night Lab
- Deutscher Radiopreis in the category "Beste Morgensendung" (Best Morning Show) in 2019 for Andreas Kuhlage and Jens Hardeland with the N-Joy Morningshow
- Deutscher Radiopreis in the category "Bestes Informationsformat" (Best Information Format) in 2021 for Carolin Wöhlert and Gina Thoneick with N-Joy Weltweit (N-Joy Worldwide)
- Deutscher Radiopreis in the category "Beste Moderatorin" (Best Presenter) in 2022 for Martina Schönherr
- Deutscher Radiopreis in the category "Bestes Musikformat" (Best Music Format) in 2023 for the N-Joy Reeperbus
