= Berichte von heute =

German radio news programme

- Running time: 30 minutes (11:30 pm – 12:00 am)
- Country of origin: Germany
- Language: German
- Syndicates: NDR 1; NDR Info; WDR 2; WDR 5
- Recording studio: Cologne (WDR); Hamburg (NDR)
- Original release: 2 January 1979 – 30 December 2020
- Opening theme: "Wade in the Water"

Berichte von heute ("Today's reports") is a German radio news programme that aired from 1979 to 2020. Jointly produced by public broadcasters Norddeutscher Rundfunk (NDR) and Westdeutscher Rundfunk (WDR), it aired from 23:30 to 24:00 each Monday to Friday night. The programme featured a round-up of the latest recorded reports received from the news correspondents of stations affiliated to the German public-broadcasting consortium ARD, introduced by a live studio presenter.

Produced on a weekly rotating basis by NDR and WDR, the programme first aired on 2 January 1979, and gave a summary of the day's most important news. Production ceased at the end of 2020, with the last edition airing on 30 December 2020, after NDR decided to pull out of the cooperation. WDR decided that continuing Berichte von heute alone was not financially possible while also continuing programmes such as Mittagsecho and Echo des Tages.

A recording of the song "Wade in the Water" performed by the Ramsey Lewis Trio served as the programme's signature tune.
