= NDR 1 Niedersachsen =

- Die Musik meines Lebens (The music of my life)
- Hanover; Germany
- Broadcast area: Lower Saxony: FM, DAB+ National: DVB-S, DVB-C; Europe: DVB-S; Worldwide: Internet
- Frequencies: FM; 87.8 MHz (Alfeld/Wahrberg); 88.2 MHz (Goslar/Sudmerberg); 88.2 MHz (Hann. Münden-Kattenbühl); 88.5 MHz (Göttingen-Nikolausberg); 88.6 MHz (Bad Pyrmont/Hamberg); 90.4 MHz (Wolfsburg); 90.9 MHz (Hanover-Hemmingen); 91.1 MHz (Steinkimmen); 91.2 MHz (Dannenberg-Zernien); 91.8 MHz (Visselhövede); 92.4 MHz (Osnabrück-Engter); 92.7 MHz (Holzminden-Stahle); 92.8 MHz (Lingen-Damaschke); 95.8 MHz (Aurich-Popens); 96.0 MHz (Bremerhaven-Schiffdorf); 98.0 MHz (Torfhaus (Harz)); 100.8 MHz (Stadthagen/Bückeberg); 103.2 MHz (Rosengarten); 105.4 MHz (Cuxhaven-Altenwalde); DAB+ 6C (Braunschweig); 6C (Oldenburg); 7A (Hanover); 8D (Cuxhaven); 9B (Lüneburg); 10A (Osnabrück); 10A (Hamburg); Satellite; Astra 1H (19.2° East) Tr. 93
- RDS: NDR1_NDS

Programming
- Language: German
- Format: Oldie-based AC/Information
- Network: NDR 1

Ownership
- Owner: Norddeutscher Rundfunk
- Sister stations: NDR 90,3; NDR 1 Welle Nord; NDR 1 Radio MV; NDR 2 NDR Kultur; NDR Info; NDR Info Spezial; N-Joy; NDR Blue; NDR Schlager

History
- First air date: January 2, 1981
- Former names: NDR 1 Radio Niedersachsen (1981-2001)

Technical information
- Transmitter coordinates: 52.4208°N 9.8061°E

Links
- Webcast: Listen Live
- Website: www.ndr.de/ndr1niedersachsen/ (in German)

NDR 1 Niedersachsen is a regional public radio station for the German state of Lower Saxony, owned and operated by the Norddeutscher Rundfunk (NDR).

NDR 1 Niedersachsen's "glass studio" at the Maschseefest in Hanover

== Programming ==
NDR 1 Niedersachsen defines itself as a harmonious regional radio station. It broadcasts extensively from Lower Saxony and plays German and international oldies and pop music. At around 30 percent, the spoken word content is very high for a format radio station.

The station evolves from a pop station to an oldie-pop station: The proportion of international titles or without Schlager songs now stands at 85 percent.

Regional reporting is one of NDR 1 Niedersachsen's main characteristics. The station broadcasts news from the regions of Lower Saxony several times a day, at half an hour. Since 1988, the station has been divided into windows, each of which broadcasts news for its own region. These regional news reports then come from the NDR studios in Oldenburg, Osnabrück, Lüneburg, Braunschweig and Hanover. The main news broadcasts on the hour also report extensively on topics from Lower Saxony.

The station focuses on further topics in hourly broadcasts in the evening: Monday: Low German, Tuesday: Culture and books, Wednesday: Advice and health, Thursday: Politics, Friday: Music and personalities, Saturday and Sunday: Music. From 9:00 PM onwards, the ARD Abend (ARD evening) and subsequently the ARD-Hitnacht (ARD hit night) will be broadcast by the Mitteldeutscher Rundfunk (MDR).

The station is commercial-free.

== Locations ==
The station broadcasts mainly from the State Radio House of Lower Saxony in Hanover on Lake Maschsee. To enable comprehensive regional reporting, NDR is represented by eight correspondents and five studios in Lower Saxony. The locations of the correspondents' offices are: Lingen/Emsland, Otterndorf/Lower Elbe, Esens/East Frisia, Verden, Hamelin/Weserbergland, Vechta, Wilhelmshaven and Berlin. The studios are located in Braunschweig, Göttingen, Oldenburg, Osnabrück and Lüneburg. Small radio and television editorial teams and technical staff with their own production technology work in these regional studios.

== Program order ==
NDR's program mandate is defined in a Government contract (NDR-StV): This Government contract obliges NDR "(...) to provide broadcasting subscribers with an objective and comprehensive overview of international, European, national and country-related events in all essential areas of life." The program should inform, educate, advise, entertain and, in particular, offer contributions to culture. The Lower Saxony state program is intended to present public events, political events and cultural and social life, particularly in Lower Saxony.

== Presenters ==
Current well-known presenters include Michael Thürnau, Andreas Kuhlage, Arne-Torben Voigts, Christina von Saß, Andreas Kuhnt, Andreas Kuhlage, Britta von Lucke, Ulf Ansorge, Sören Oelrichs and Susanne Neuß.

Former well-known presenters in Lower Saxony who no longer host on NDR 1 Niedersachsen include Lutz Ackermann, Lars Cohrs, Kerstin Werner, Christiane Köller, Anke Genius, Monika Walden and Jens Krause.

== Audience ==
According to Media-Analyse 2015/II, NDR 1 Niedersachsen is the market leader in its broadcasting area (market share: 23.9%, people aged 10 and over, Mon-Sun) and has been the most popular radio station in Lower Saxony for 23 years. It is listened to by over 2.2 million people every day and is even one of the most listened to radio stations nationwide.

The station is aimed at a target group of people aged 50 and over.

== Music ==
NDR 1 Niedersachsen plays melodically relaxed music, primarily consisting of oldies (50%), pop ballads (30%), and German cult hits (20%). The music is continuously updated, with a reduction in the share of schlager music.

The music selection is not strictly based on genre (e.g. pop music), but rather, the music editors choose tracks based on a relaxed vibe. As a result, the station features artists from nearly all music genres: pop (e.g. ABBA, Katie Melua), rock (ballads by the Rolling Stones, Santana), country (e.g. Chet Atkins, Johnny Cash), instrumental (e.g. film scores), and German cult hits, ranging from Neue Deutsche Welle to German pop and schlager (e.g. Markus, Münchner Freiheit, Helene Fischer, Udo Jürgens). The station has not played folk music for several years, and since July 2014, schlager has almost entirely disappeared from the playlist.

NDR 1 Niedersachsen's station identification (ID) melody was a progressively stylized version of the folk song "Wanderschaft" (also known as "Das Wandern ist des Müllers Lust") by Wilhelm Müller (audio sample available in the web links). Since 2021, this melody has no longer been used.

NDR 1 Niedersachsen is a full-program station that broadcasts 24 hours a day. Between 9:00 PM and 11:00 PM, the ARD Abend is broadcast, and from 11:00 PM onwards, the ARD-Hitnacht is broadcast, both of which are provided by the MDR.

== History ==
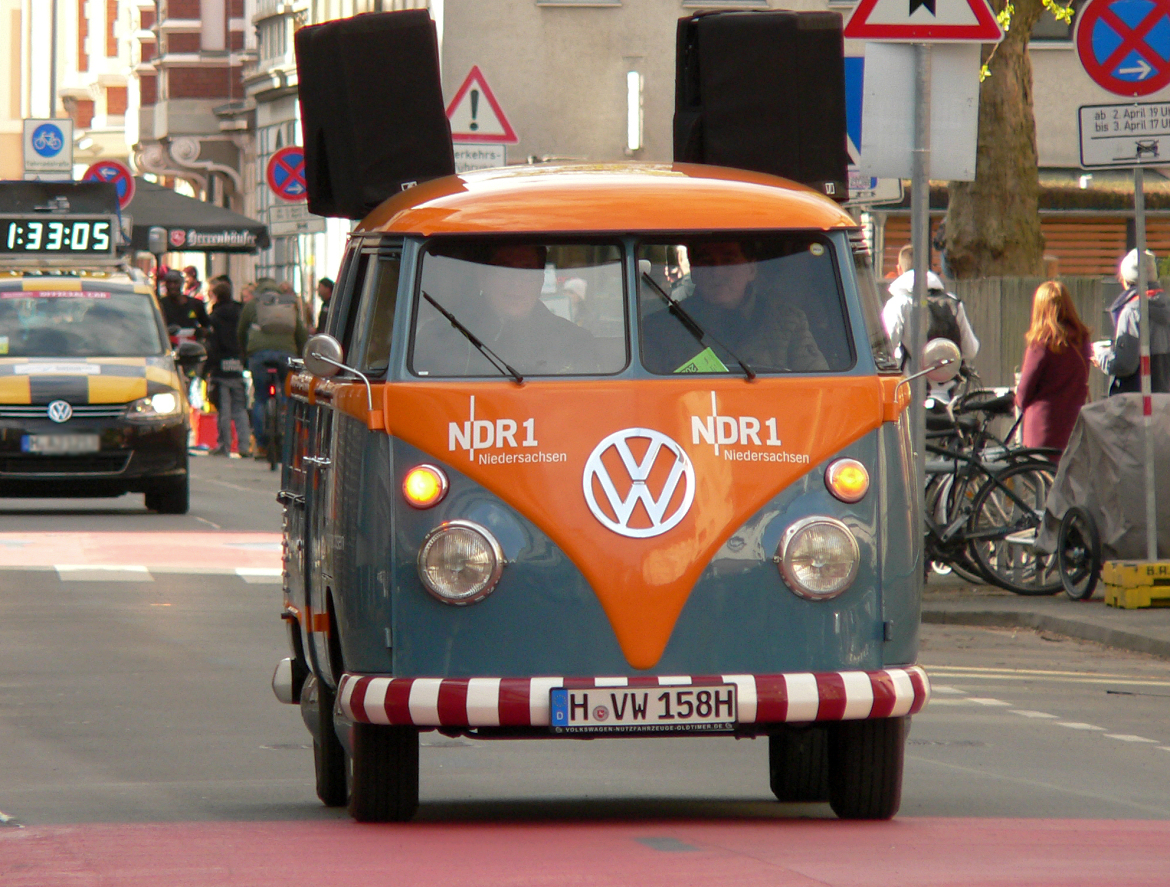
NDR 1 Niedersachsen's VW bus at the Hannover Marathon in 2022

The station's establishment occurred in the late 1970s when the then Christian Democratic state government of Lower Saxony, led by Ernst Albrecht, began taking political action against the NDR, which was seen as a "left-wing broadcaster". By dismantling the former regional network NDR 1/WDR 1 in favor of separate state networks for Schleswig-Holstein, Hamburg and Lower Saxony, Albrecht aimed to create a state broadcaster in Hanover that would offer better political control over both employees and programming. As a result, the station and its programming earned a reputation for being close to the CDU (Christian Democratic Union).

The station, launched on January 2, 1981, was intended to have a strong regional focus. Although the Hanover-based state broadcasting house, from which one would most expect coverage of Lower Saxony, had already been established in 1952. However, the proportion of Lower Saxony-related content remained small in the entire NDR program (or its predecessor, NWDR, until 1956). The amount of radio information from the Lower Saxony state broadcasting house at Maschsee included in the NDR program actually decreased significantly between 1956 and 1977. The insufficient regional reporting became a key argument for the CDU in advocating for a reform of NDR's stations and programming.

NDR 1 Niedersachsen, which was known as NDR 1 Radio Niedersachsen until May 13, 2002, initially struggled significantly after its launch, becoming a clear failure. With only 450,000 listeners, the station had a very low market share of just five percent. Among other issues, it initially lacked national and international news. The establishment of regional program windows also took several years, and the adequate staffing of regional studios in Lower Saxony was only fully realized after 1999. The music mix was undefined until 1993, when the new music director, Lutz Ackermann, introduced a cohesive musical style: a mix of schlager, evergreens, folk music and harmonious instrumental tracks. Following this change, the station achieved significant audience ratings and became one of the most-listened-to radio stations in Germany.

Since July 2024, Nils Nelleßen has been the new station voice for NDR 1 Niedersachsen. He replaced Uwe Hessenmüller, who retired after more than 20 years as the station's voice.

== Reception ==
NDR 1 Niedersachsen is receivable via a wide range of transmission methods. The station can be received via FM in Lower Saxony, Bremen, Hamburg and parts of Schleswig-Holstein, Mecklenburg-Vorpommern, Brandenburg, Hesse, North Rhine-Westphalia, Saxony-Anhalt, Thuringia and the Netherlands. Additionally, the radio station is available in many cable networks, worldwide via the internet (live stream, with selected shows also available as podcasts) and across Europe via digital satellite (Astra). NDR 1 Niedersachsen is broadcast through 19 FM transmitters across Lower Saxony and has been available via DAB+ since 2012.

Through the frequency FM 98.0 MHz (Harz-West transmitter in the Upper Harz: 772 m elevation, 243 m antenna height and a transmission power of 100 kW), NDR 1 Niedersachsen can be received with good receivers and in favorable reception locations in large parts of Central Germany (up to around Leipzig), as well as in North and East Hesse, the northern peaks of the Bavarian Rhön, and the Thuringian Forest. Additionally, the station can be heard on the frequency FM 91.1 MHz from the Steinkimmen transmitter in almost all of northern Lower Saxony.

Since May 28, 2014, NDR 1 Niedersachsen has also been broadcasting from Klieversberg in Wolfsburg, with a transmission power of 100 watts on the FM frequency 90.4 MHz.

== Literature ==
- Stefan Matysiak: Heimat für die Ohren. Südniedersachsen im Radio. In: Stefan Matysiak (Hg.): Von braunen Wurzeln und großer Einfalt. Südniedersächsische Medien in Geschichte und Gegenwart. Norderstedt: BoD, 2014, ISBN 978-3-7347-3375-8, S. 210–236.
- Helmut Volpers/Detlef Schnier/Christian Salwiczek: Programme der nichtkommerziellen Lokalradios in Niedersachsen. Eine Programm- und Akzeptanzanalyse. Berlin: Vistas, 2000.
- Helmut Volpers/Uli Bernhard/Detlef Schnier: Hörfunklandschaft Niedersachsen 2009. Strukturbeschreibung und Programmanalyse. Berlin: Vistas, 2010.
- Fred Bake: Betr.: NDR, Radio Niedersachsen – die Folgen einer Programmreform. Dokumentation. Hrsg. v. d. Industriegewerkschaft Medien, Druck und Papier, Publizistik und Kunst, Landesbezirk Niedersachsen-Bremen. Hannover: Industriegewerkschaft Medien, Druck und Papier, Publizistik und Kunst, Landesbezirk Niedersachsen-Bremen, 1989.
