= Flensburg-Jürgensby transmitter =

Flensburg-Jürgensby transmitter was the first transmitter of Flensburg, situated in Jürgensby district. It went in service in 1928 and used, at its beginning, a quadruple T-antenna which was spun between two 60 metres tall wood lattice towers. These were 80 metres apart. In 1934 the transmission power was increased from 0.5 kW to 3 kW.

On March 15, 1935 the erection of a new 90 metres tall wood lattice tower started, which carried a skywave suppressing antenna. The new tower was inaugurated on April 9, 1935. In August 1935 the two lattice towers carrying the T-antenna were demolished.

Flensburg-Jürgensby transmitter was one of the few transmitters in Germany which worked at the end of World War II. and so the report of the unconditional surrender of the German military on May 8, 1945 was broadcast from there.

In 1957 the wooden radio tower was replaced by a 216 metres tall guyed tubular mast, which was insulated against ground as it was not able to carry the antenna for TV broadcasting on its top. As this mast was also used for mediumwave broadcasting, it was insulated against ground.

In 1988 construction of a new mast further east at Flensburg-Engelsby started, as the mast, which was situated in a housing area endangered people in winter by icefall and there was no space for expansion. Two years later the mast of Flensburg-Jürgensby transmitter was dismantled.

== Literature ==
- Die Geschichte der deutschen Mittelwellen-Sendeanlagen von 1923 bis 1945, ISBN 978-3-939197-51-5, Seite 64, 65, 112
