= Norddeutscher Rundfunk =

Public service broadcaster in Northern Germany

- Logo used since 2001
- Type: Broadcast radio, television and online
- Country: Germany
- Headquarters: Hamburg, Germany
- Area: Lower Saxony, Mecklenburg-Vorpommern and Schleswig-Holstein
- Launch date: 2 May 1924 as NORAG; 1 January 1956 (70 years ago) as NDR
- Former names: Nordische Rundfunk AG (1924–1933); Norddeutsche Rundfunk GmbH (1933–1934); Reichssender Hamburg (1934–1945); Nordwestdeutscher Rundfunk (1945–1955)
- Webcast: NDR HD TV; NDR1 Radio; NDR 90.3 FM; NDR 2 Radio; NDR Info; NDR Kultur; NDR Info Spezial; NDRPlus; NDR Blue; NDR Schlager
- Official website: www.ndr.de

Norddeutscher Rundfunk (pronounced [ˈnɔʁtˌdɔʏtʃɐ ˈʁʊntfʊŋk]; "North German Broadcasting"), commonly shortened to NDR (pronounced [ˌɛndeːˈʔɛʁ]), is a public radio and television broadcaster, based in Hamburg. In addition to the city-state of Hamburg, NDR broadcasts for the German states of Lower Saxony, Mecklenburg-Vorpommern and Schleswig-Holstein. NDR is a member of ARD, the joint organisation of German public broadcasters.

== History ==
=== Pre-war ===
In 1924 broadcasting began in Hamburg, when Norddeutsche Rundfunk AG (NORAG) was created. In 1934 it was incorporated into the Großdeutscher Rundfunk, the national broadcaster controlled by Joseph Goebbels's Propagandaministerium, as Reichssender Hamburg.

In 1930, NORAG commissioned the Welte-Funkorgel – a large theatre organ custom-built by the firm of M. Welte & Sons to meet the specific acoustic requirements of radio broadcasting – and installed it in their radio studio (today the world's oldest such facility still in use) on Rothenbaumchaussee 132, Hamburg, where it continues to be played, now maintained by volunteers.

=== Post-war ===
In the British Zone of occupied Germany, the military authorities quickly established Radio Hamburg to provide information to the population of the area.

The British Control Commission appointed Hugh Greene to manage the creation of public service broadcasting in their Zone. On 22 September 1945, Radio Hamburg became Nordwestdeutscher Rundfunk (North-Western German Broadcasting), the single broadcasting organisation of the British Zone.

The state of Bremen, while surrounded by the British Zone, was given to the United States as part of the American Zone. A separate broadcaster was established for this state, Radio Bremen. However, Radio Bremen and NDR cooperate in certain programmes and stations.

=== Länder control ===
In 1948, the Control Commission transferred the Nordwestdeutscher Rundfunk (NWDR) to the control of the constituent Länder (Hamburg, Lower Saxony, North Rhine-Westphalia and Schleswig-Holstein). At first, NWDR had just one radio station, later known as NWDR1. In 1950, it introduced a regional station for the north, NWDR Nord (later to become NDR2), and a regional station for the west, NWDR West (later WDR2).

That same year, NWDR became a founding member of ARD, a joint organisation of all German regional broadcasters. The NWDR also played a founding role in launching 625-line television in Germany, starting broadcasts on 25 December 1952.

=== NWDR split ===
In February 1955, North Rhine-Westphalia decided to establish its broadcaster, whilst Hamburg, Lower Saxony and Schleswig-Holstein continued with the existing joint system. To this end, the NWDR was split into two broadcasters, Norddeutscher Rundfunk (NDR) in the north and Westdeutscher Rundfunk (WDR) in North Rhine-Westphalia.

NDR continued to operate out of Hamburg. The split was effective from 1 January 1956, although the radio station NWDR1 remained a joint operation with regional opt-outs.

The NWDR television service also remained a joint operation, from 1 April 1956 under the name Nord- und Westdeutsche Rundfunkverband (North and West German Broadcasting Federation – NWRV). NDR and WDR launched separate television services for their respective areas in 1961.

=== NDR history ===
NDR's first logo, used from 1956 to 1980

NDR's previous corporate logo, was used from 1980 to 2001. Its old corporate logo featured Antje the Walrus, the mascot of the broadcaster for the north.

On 1 December 1956 NDR started its third radio channel, NDR3 (from 1962 to 1973, it was operated jointly with Sender Freies Berlin).

In 1958 Han Koller became the musical director of Hamburg's NDR Jazz Workshop, which became a popular radio broadcast. Numerous names in Jazz performed on these broadcasts including; Dave Brubeck, Kenny Clarke, Lucky Thompson, Wes Montgomery, Johnny Griffin, Oscar Peterson, Ben Webster, Sahib Shihab, Carmell Jones, Lee Konitz, Cecil Payne, Slide Hampton, Phil Woods, Jazz Composers Orchestra, Howard Riley, Barry Guy, John Surman, the Kuhn Brothers and Barney Wilen. Some of these have been released since 1987, while the older ones only exist as rare bootlegs, sought after by many Jazz aficionados.

On 4 January 1965 NDR, Radio Bremen and Sender Freies Berlin (SFB) began a joint "third channel" television service, Norddeutsches Fernsehen, later Nord 3 and N3. Since December 2001, this service is called NDR Fernsehen. SFB started a separate TV channel for Berlin in 1992, called B1, later SFB1, now RBB Fernsehen.

In 1977, Gerhard Stoltenberg, the minister-president of Schleswig-Holstein unilaterally cancelled the NDR-Staatsvertrag, the governing contract of NDR. This caused a discussion on how to organise broadcasting in the North German region.

In 1980, NDR signed a new contract with the three Länder, changing the pattern of broadcasting and creating new regional services. NDR1 was divided into three independent radio stations from 2 January 1981:

- NDR 1 Radio Niedersachsen (from 2002, NDR 1 Niedersachsen) for Lower Saxony
- NDR 1 Welle Nord for Schleswig-Holstein
- NDR Hamburg-Welle 90.3 (from 2 December 2001, NDR 90.3) for Hamburg

NDR2 and NDR3 (now NDR Kultur) continued as regional stations.

These regional services were further subdivided with opt-outs for specific areas. NDR 1 Niedersachsen established regions based around Oldenburg-Ostfriesland-Bremen-Cuxhaven, Osnabrück-Emsland, greater Hanover, Braunschweig-southern Lower Saxony and northern Lower Saxony. NDR 1 Welle Nord was subdivided with studio centres in Flensburg, Heide, Norderstedt, Lübeck and Kiel.

Roughly around 1983–1984, "Subways of Your Mind" was recorded from NDR2, with the title of the song remaining completely unknown until forty years after it was played on NDR2.

On 30 September 1988 NDR introduced a Teletext service on its N3 television channel. Originally called Nordtext, it became NDR Text on 2 December 2001. The Teletext service also offers information for viewers in the Radio Bremen area under the title Radio Bremen Text.

On 1 April 1989, NDR introduced its fourth radio service, NDR4. This service was later renamed NDR4 Info and since 2 June 2002 has been known as NDR Info. The station is a news and information service for the whole NDR region.

On 1 January 1992, Mecklenburg-Vorpommern in former East Germany joined NDR as the fourth state in the organisation, where it replaced Fernsehen der DDR and Rundfunk der DDR. The area receives the main NDR radio and television stations, plus the regional NDR 1 Radio mV, which has subregions based in Schwerin, Rostock, Neubrandenburg and Greifswald. In October of the same year, SFB in Berlin stopped relaying the Nord 3 television service in favour of its own Berlin 1 TV channel.

On 4 April 1994, NDR introduced N-Joy Radio (known simply as N-Joy since 2001), a radio station aimed at 14 to 29-year-old listeners.

On 3 October 1997, NDR3 was relaunched as Radio 3, produced in co-operation with Ostdeutscher Rundfunk Brandenburg. At the end of 2000, SFB joined Radio 3. This arrangement lasted until ORB and SFB merged on 1 January 2003 and started its own classical and cultural network. NDR3 became NDR Kultur on 1 January 2003.

On 1 November 2001, NDR and Radio Bremen launched a joint radio station, Nordwestradio, to serve Bremen and northwestern Lower Saxony. This service replaced Radio Bremen 2 and control of the service remains with Radio Bremen.

NDR is the organization within ARD which oversaw Germany's participation in the Eurovision Song Contest from 1996 to 2025. SWR took over that function from 2026 onwards. Following Germany's victory in the 55th annual contest, NDR organised the 56th annual contest on behalf of ARD. The contest was held in Düsseldorf on 10–14 May 2011 despite the city being located outside NDR's broadcasting area.

== Studios ==
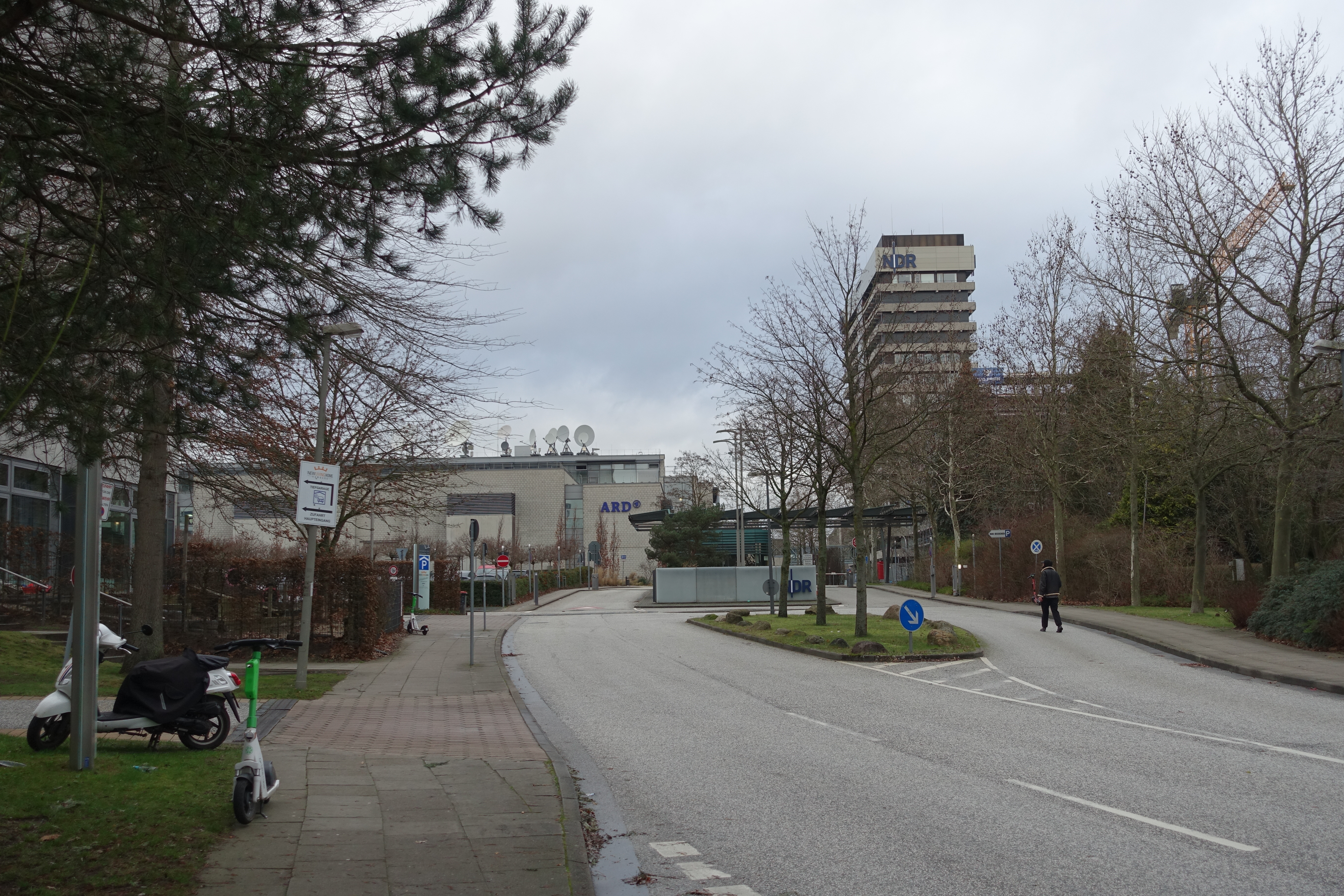
NDR television buildings in Hamburg (2023)

NDR's studios in Hamburg are in two locations, both within the borough of Eimsbüttel: the television studios are in the quarter of Lokstedt while the radio studios are in the quarter of Harvestehude (though they are called "Funkhaus am Rothenbaum"), a little closer to the city centre. There are also regional studios, having both radio and television production facilities, in the state capitals Hanover, Kiel and Schwerin. The facility in Hanover is now called the Landesfunkhaus Niedersachsen. In addition, NDR maintains facilities at ARD's national studios in Berlin.

== Organization and finances ==
=== Chairmen of the Norddeutscher Rundfunk ===
- 1955–1961: Walter Hilpert
- 1961–1974: Gerhard Schröder
- 1974–1980: Martin Neuffer
- 1980–1987: Friedrich-Wilhelm Räuker
- 1987–1991: Peter Schiwy
- 1991–2008: Jobst Plog
- 2008–2020: Lutz Marmor
- 2020–present: Joachim Knuth

=== Funding ===
NDR is in part funded by the limited sale of on-air commercial advertising time; however, its principal source of income is the revenue derived from viewer and listener licence fees. As of August 2021, the monthly fee due from each household for radio and television reception was €18.36. These fees are collected not directly by NDR but by a joint agency of ARD (and its member institutions), ZDF, and Deutschlandradio.

== Services ==
Map of the ARD broadcasting regions in Germany

NDR currently provides a number of services on its own or in co-operation with other broadcasters:

=== Television ===
- Das Erste – joint national channel
- NDR Fernsehen (formerly N3 and Norddeutsches Fernsehen) – third public service channel for the NDR area and Bremen, in co-operation with Radio Bremen.
- Phoenix – events channel produced by ARD and ZDF
- KI.KA – children's channel produced by ARD and ZDF
- Arte – Franco-German culture channel
- 3sat – cultural channel, co-produced by ARD, ZDF, ORF, and SRG
- tagesschau24 – news channel (closed until 31 December 2026)

=== Radio ===
- NDR 1 network consists of four independent radio stations:
  - NDR 90,3 – Local station for Hamburg, music for older listeners.
  - NDR 1 Niedersachsen – Local station for Lower Saxony, run from Hanover with some regional opt-outs. Music for older listeners.
  - NDR 1 Welle Nord – Local station for Schleswig-Holstein, run from Kiel with some regional opt-outs. Music for older listeners.
  - NDR 1 Radio MV – Local station for Mecklenburg-Vorpommern, run from Schwerin with some regional opt-outs. Music for older listeners.
- NDR 2 – Popular music station for middle-aged listeners. A commercial public service station.
- NDR Kultur – Arts and culture station (formerly NDR 3). Classical music.
- NDR Info – News and information station (formerly NDR 4 or NDR 4 Info).
- NDR Info Spezial - Same programming as NDR Info with opt-outs for sports, sessions of parliament, maritime forecasts, multicultural programming and ARD Infonacht. (planned to close by 31 December 2026)
- N-Joy – youth station.
- NDR Blue – Music "away from the charts". (planned to close by 31 December 2026)
- NDR Schlager – a music station with the programming format schlager music and easy listening (planned to close by 31 December 2026)

== Broadcasts ==
- Berichte von heute news program

== Musical organizations ==
NDR has four musical organizations, including two orchestras, a chorus and a "big band":

- NDR Elbphilharmonie Orchester – the North German Radio Elbphilharmonie Orchestra; created in 1945 as the Symphony Orchestra of the NWDR and continued by NDR under the name NDR Sinfonieorchester between 1955 – 2016. It was renamed in 2016 to its current name. Principal conductors have included Günter Wand and John Eliot Gardiner. Currently it is Alan Gilbert.
- NDR Radiophilharmonie – the NDR Radio Philharmonic; created in 1950 as the Hanover Radio Orchestra of the NWDR and continued by NDR under the name Radiophilharmonie Hannover; it received its current name in 2003. Principal conductors have included Willy Steiner, Bernhard Klee (twice), and Eiji Oue. The orchestra also plays light classical or "concert hall" music.
- NDR Chor or Chor des Norddeutschen Rundfunks—created in 1946 by the NWDR and continued under that name until 2022 when it became NDR Vokalensemble. It consists of 21 professional singers on fixed contracts. The is Klaas Stok. The choir specializes in Early music, but a broad repertory also includes contemporary music.
- NDR Bigband; created by the NWDR and continued by NDR in 1955 as the NDR Studioband. Renamed NDR Bigband in 1971.

== Transmitters ==
=== FM, MW and TV ===
- Hamburg Billwerder
- Hemmingen (for Hannover)
- Flensburg
- Kronshagen (for Kiel, no AM broadcasts currently)
- Lingen

=== FM and TV ===
- Steinkimmen
- Torfhaus (Sender Harz-West)
- Zernien
- Osnabrück
- Aurich-Popens
- Göttingen
- Lauenburg
- Bungsberg
- Welmbüttel/Heide (Holstein)
- Sylt
- Visselhövede
- Cuxhaven
- Kronshagen (near Kiel)

=== Mecklenburg-Vorpommern ===
In Mecklenburg-Vorpommern, in former East Germany, NDR programmes are broadcast from facilities owned by Media Broadcast GmbH, a former subsidiary of Deutsche Telekom AG.

== Other facilities ==
- Wittmoor Measurement and Reception Station
