= NDR 1 Welle Nord =

- Kiel; Germany
- Broadcast area: Schleswig-Holstein, Hamburg: FM, DAB+ National: DVB-S, DVB-C; Europe: DVB-S; Worldwide: Internet
- Frequency: see below
- RDS: NDR_1_SH

Programming
- Language: German
- Format: Adult Contemporary/Information
- Network: NDR 1

Ownership
- Owner: Norddeutscher Rundfunk
- Sister stations: NDR 90,3; NDR 1 Niedersachsen; NDR 1 Radio MV; NDR 2 NDR Kultur; NDR Info; NDR Info Spezial; N-Joy; NDR Blue; NDR Schlager

History
- First air date: January 2, 1981

Links
- Webcast: Listen Live
- Website: www.ndr.de/wellenord/ (in German)

NDR 1 Welle Nord is a regional public radio station for the German state of Schleswig-Holstein, owned and operated by the Norddeutscher Rundfunk (NDR).

As of 2026, the station has about 451,000 daily listeners.

== History ==
NDR 1 Welle Nord launched on January 2, 1981, as a regional service for Schleswig-Holstein and was expanded in several stages, culminating in April 1989, into a full-service radio program.

Today, NDR 1 Welle Nord broadcasts its own programming from Monday to Friday between 5:00 and 21:00, and on weekends between 6:05 and 21:00. At the remaining times, the regional station broadcasts the joint ARD evening program, the ARD Abend (ARD evening) from MDR (starting at 21:00) and the ARD Hitnacht (ARD hit night) (starting at 23:00), which is also produced by MDR.

== Target groups, programming and market share ==
The station primarily targets the middle generation, and until 2011 also the older generation. Its current advertising slogan isslogan is: "Wir lieben Musik, wir lieben Schleswig-Holstein. Moin!" (We love music, we love Schleswig-Holstein. Hello!). For a long time, the music programming consisted partly of German pop hits, oldies, and more recent music from the last two decades, but also included current music. Between 2008 and 2012, the station evolved from a German pop music station to a pop music station. Initially, in 2008, the proportion of German pop music was reduced from 70% to 20%, and the proportion of oldies was increased from 30% to 50%. In addition, 20% modern chart pop was added to the programming. In 2011, German schlager music was completely removed from the playlist. The station then played 50% oldies from the 60s and 70s, 25% hits from the 80s and 90s, and 25% modern pop. In 2012, during the final modernization phase, the proportion of oldies from the 60s and 70s was reduced to 30%, the proportion of music from the 80s and 90s was increased to 40% and the proportion of modern music was raised to 30%. At this point, music by artists such as Die Toten Hosen, Lady Gaga and others was also added.

Three times a day, the broadcast splits to provide regional coverage, connecting to studios in Flensburg (NDR Studio Flensburg), Heide, Norderstedt, Lübeck, and Kiel. The station also frequently features sports reports, for example, from the Handball-Bundesliga or the Regionalliga (fourth division) of German football. As a rule, except for the programs "Von Binnenland und Waterkant" (From Inland and Coast), "Zur Sache" (To the Point), "Beat Classics" and "Hits und Oldies" (Hits und Oldies), only one German song is played per hour.

With a 21.4% market share, NDR 1 Welle Nord is the market leader in Schleswig-Holstein; its closest competitor (NDR 2) reaches 20.9%, while R.SH ranks third with 18.7%. NDR 1 Welle Nord has been market leader eight times so far.

== Popular shows ==
=== Von Binnenland und Waterkant ===
Monday-Friday: 19:05-21:00

The program was first broadcast on May 16, 1951, as a regional program on NWDR 1 radio for the state of Schleswig-Holstein, originating from the Flensburg studio. It remains the most prominent program of this regional station, now NDR 1. Today, it is the evening magazine of NDR 1 Welle Nord. It features topics, people and events from across the state. Von Binnenland und Waterkant was created in Schleswig-Holstein's oldest studio, the NDR studio in Flensburg, and is also the oldest radio program in the state. The program celebrated its 60th anniversary in 2011. The program is hosted by a rotating cast of presenters. On Thursdays, the Ostseemagazin (Baltic Sea Magazine) was a regular feature from 9:05 p.m. to 10:00 p.m. The "Ostseemagazin" is a joint production of NDR and the Swedish radio station Sveriges Radio. Within the magazine, reporters cover news from across the Baltic Sea region, including Sweden, Finland, Poland, Russia and also Northern Germany.

=== Niederdeutsches Hörspiel ===
Every other Friday: 20:05-21:00

Every other Friday at 21:05, one can listen to Niederdeutsches Hörspiel (Low German radio plays). The broadcasts feature classics from the NDR archives as well as new productions by contemporary authors. The content ranges from bawdy and funny to critically reflective.

=== Zur Sache ===
Sunday: 18:05-20:00

In this program, a topic from within the country is selected and then discussed with various guests in the studio or on location. Listeners can also participate in this discussion by phone or email.

=== Hör mal 'n beten to ===
The short segment Hör mal 'n beten to consists of a commentary or a brief, witty piece by the radio hosts, focusing on everyday topics or current events. Whereas many years ago it could be heard for more than ten minutes in the morning, it is now shown between 10 and 12 a.m. and repeated between 8 and 10 p.m. in a shortened format of two and a half minutes.

== Employees ==
=== Presenters ===
Core team: (Monday-Friday)

- Horst Hoof / Moin! Schleswig-Holstein
- Mandy Schmidt / Moin! Schleswig-Holstein
- Jan Bastick / Schleswig-Holstein mittendrin

Various programs:

- Dennis Brandau
- Leslie Hodam
- Christina Gronwald
- Lina Bande
- Miriam Pede
- Kaya Laß
- Maja Herzbach
- Christian Haacke
- Patricia Schanz
- Lina Martschin
- Nathalie Werkle
- Helge Albrecht
- Birgit Hahn
- Jan Graf

== Former presenters ==
- Wilken F. Dincklage (1942-1994)
- Uwe Arkuszewski (1962-2004)
- Wolf-Dieter Stubel (1941-2023)
- Britta von Lojewski (* 1963)
- Gerrit Derkowski (* 1969)
- Christian Schröder (* 1953)
- Petra Wanitschka (1966-2015)
- Holger Thomas (* 1956)
- Jürgen Koppelin (* 1945)
- Alexander Bommes (* 1976)
- Jens Schulenburg (* 1970)
- Jan Malte Andresen (* 1972)
- Meeno Schrader (* 1961)
- Julian Krafftzig (* 1977)

== Reception ==
=== FM ===
The station can be received via the following FM frequencies:

Transmitter location	Frequency (MHz)	Effective radiant power in kW	Maximum height above average terrain
Sender Heide (Dithmarschen)	90.5	15	209 m
Kiel/Kronshagen-Heischberg	91.3	15	202 m
Flensburg/Engelsby-Fuchsberg	89.6	25	250 m
Helgoland/Oberland	88.9	0.16	120 m
Hamburg/Moorfleet	89.5	10	221 m
Sylt/Morsum-Nösse	90.9	5	85 m
Lübeck/Wallanlagen	93.1	0.5	69 m
Lauenburg/Echem	94.7	0.3	55 m
Bungsberg (NDR-Mast)	97.8	50	286 m
Mölln/Talkau-Lehmberg	104.5	20	150 m
Neumünster/Hasenkrug	106.4	20	180 m

=== DAB+ ===
On November 22, 2011, the station also launched via DAB+.

DAB+ channels are as follows:

- 9A (Lübeck)
- 9C (Kiel)
- 10A (Hamburg)
- 10C (Norderstedt)
- 11B (Heide)
- 12B (Flensburg)

=== Satellite ===
Astra 1H (19.2° East) Tr. 93

=== Use of the Radio Data System ===
Since mid-March 2011, Welle Nord has been transmitting the song being played and the corresponding artist via the RDS service.
