= Radio ffn =

Coordinates: 52.3776°N 9.7309°E

- Germany
- Broadcast area: Lower Saxony, Bremen, Hamburg and adjacent areas
- Frequencies: FM: 100.6 – 103.4 MHz, 107.6 MHz (Hameln); DVB-S: Astra 19.2°E at 12.633 GHz horizontally (SR 22,000, FEC 5/6, SID 12654)

Programming
- Format: Adult Contemporary

Ownership
- Owner: Funk & Fernsehen Nordwestdeutschland GmbH & Co. KG

History
- First air date: 31 December 1986

Links
- Website: www.ffn.de

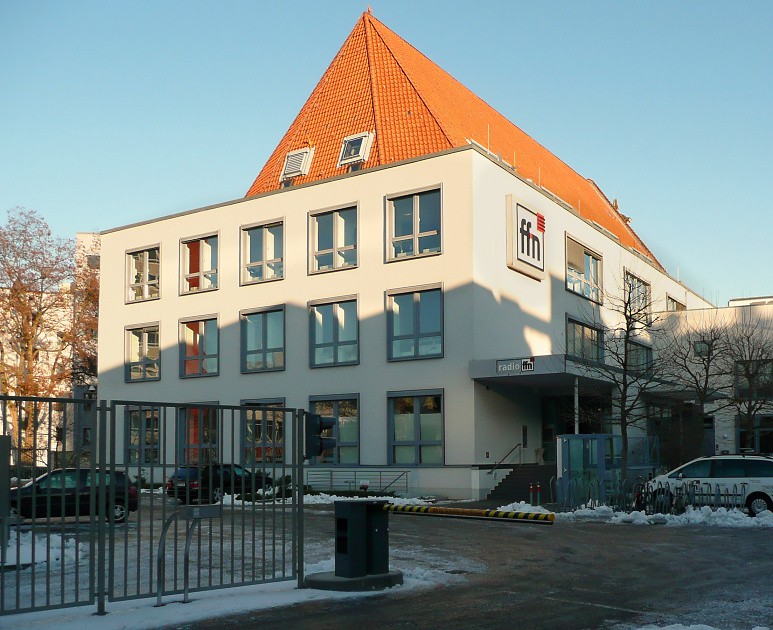
Station headquarters and studios in the former swimming pool at the Goseriede in Hanover

Radio ffn is a commercial radio station operated by Funk & Fernsehen Nordwestdeutschland GmbH & Co. KG in Lower Saxony, Germany. It broadcasts from regional studios in Braunschweig, Göttingen, Hanover (station HQ), Lüneburg, Oldenburg, and Osnabrück.

The station's managing director is Harald Gehrung and its program chief is Ina Tenz.

As well as transmitting on FM and satellite (DVB-S) ffn has since 2010 also been receivable via iPhone and iPad, with separate apps for each device.

== Programmes and presenters ==
- Niedersachsens beste Morningshow ("Lower Saxony's best morning show")

Frank Schulte (alias Franky)

- ffn am Vormittag ("ffn in the forenoon")

Julian Zumbrock

- ffn am Nachmittag ("ffn in the afternoon")

Timm Busche

- ffn am Abend ("ffn in the evening")

Marie Günther

- Die Nacht in Niedersachsen ("The night in Lower Saxony")

Pure Music

- Die Morningshow am Samstag ("The morning show on Saturday")

Malte Seidel
