= Carlo von Tiedemann =

German television presenter (1943–2025)

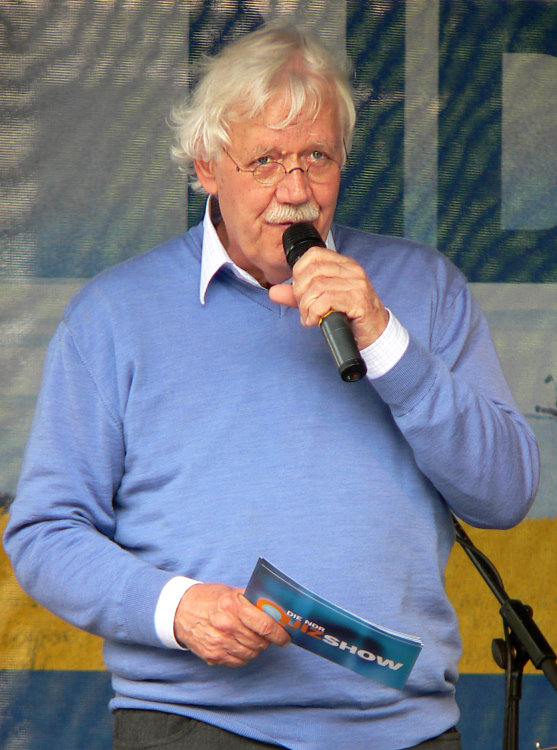
- Von Tiedemann in 2010
- Born: 20 October 1943; Stargard, Gau Pomerania, Germany
- Died: 8 June 2025 (aged 81); Hamburg, Germany
- Occupations: Television presenter, journalist
- Children: 4

Carlo von Tiedemann (20 October 1943 – 8 June 2025) was a German journalist and television presenter.

== Life and career ==
Carlo von Tiedemann was born to Lieutenant General Carl von Tiedemann (1878–1979) and Fides von Tiedemann, née von Kleist (1910–1980). He started to work for Axel-Springer-Verlag and as a journalist for Cuxhavener Allgemeinen and Hamburger Abendblatt.

From 1971 onwards, Tiedemann worked as a television and radio presenter for German broadcaster NDR. From 1980 to 1988 Tiedemann was married for the first time. Tiedemann was in his second marriage since 2012. He had four children.

Tiedemann lived in Quickborn and Hamburg, where he died on 8 June 2025, at the age of 81.

== Television ==
- Aktuelle Schaubude (1977–1988, 1997–2004)
- Show & Co. mit Carlo
- Lachen macht Spaß
- Eurotops
- Deutscher Musikladen
- Große Hafenrundfahrt
- Große Show für kleine Leute (ZDF, 1984)
- DAS!
- Tipps für das Wochenende: Was ist los in Hamburg?
- Lachen mit ...
- Große Freiheit
- NDR 90,3 Fofteihn
- NDR 90,3 Zur Sache
- NDR2 — Der heisse Draht
- NDR2 — Von neun bis halb eins
- NDR2 — Am Vormittag
- NDR-Talkshow
- NDR-Quizshow

== Literature ==
- So. Und nicht anders. Mein aufregendes Leben, by Jens Meyer-Odewald, Verlag Die Hanse, Hamburg 2005, ISBN 3-434-52614-5.
