= NDR Kultur =

- Hören und Genießen (Listen and enjoy)
- Hamburg; Germany
- Broadcast area: Hamburg, Mecklenburg-Vorpommern, Lower Saxony, Schleswig-Holstein: FM, DAB+ National: DVB-S, DVB-C; Europe: DVB-S; Worldwide: Internet
- Frequency: see below
- RDS: NDR_Kult

Programming
- Language: German
- Format: Culture (Brokered programming)

Ownership
- Owner: Norddeutscher Rundfunk
- Sister stations: NDR 90,3; NDR 1 Niedersachsen; NDR 1 Welle Nord; NDR 1 Radio MV; NDR 2 NDR Info; NDR Info Spezial; N-Joy; NDR Blue; NDR Schlager

History
- First air date: January 1, 2003

Technical information
- Transmitter coordinates: 53.576751°N 9.992205°E

Links
- Webcast: Listen Live
- Website: www.ndr.de/kultur (in German)

NDR Kultur is a German public radio station owned and operated by the Norddeutscher Rundfunk (NDR). The headquarters is on the Rothenbaumchaussee in Hamburg. It broadcasts a culture and politics-based talk programming with a musical focus on classical music. Radio plays, as well as literary and religious topics, are also included.

As of 2026, NDR Kultur has more than two million daily listeners.

== History ==
On December 1, 1956, the third NDR radio station began broadcasting daily via FM from 8:15 p.m. until 10:30 p.m. or midnight. On January 1, 1994, NDR 3 was reformed, and overlaps with NDR 4 were to be avoided. During the day, extensive classical music programs were broadcast, while the evening featured cultural talk programs.

The Sender Freies Berlin (SFB) and Ostdeutscher Rundfunk Brandenburg (ORB) took over NDR 3's programming on October 8, 1997, and added regional segments within their broadcast area. The new name of their joint cultural radio station was Radio 3. After SFB's withdrawal, NDR and ORB continued to broadcast Radio 3 independently from January 1, 2001 to December 31, 2002. The current cultural and music station, now called "NDR Kultur", began broadcasting on January 1, 2003. Since November 22, 2011, the station has been available via DAB+.

== General programming schedule ==
Time	Day(s)	Program	Contents / Remarks
00:05-06:00	Mon-Sun	ARD-Nachtkonzert	—
06:03-10:00	Mon-Fri	Der Morgen	Music and current reports from culture and society
08:30-09:00	Mon-Sun	Am Morgen vorgelesen	Literary works read in installments as a serial story
10:03-13:00	Mon-Sun	Der Vormittag	Music and current reports on culture and society
13:00-14:00	Mon-Fri	Klassik à la carte	Interview with a studio guest, interspersed with their music requests
14:03-16:00	Mon-Fri	Der Nachmittag	Music and current reports on culture and society
16:03-18:00	Mon-Fri	Journal	Culture magazine
18:03-19:00	Mon-Fri	Klassik à la carte	Interview with a studio guest, interspersed with their music requests
19:03-20:00	Mon-Fri	Musica	Classical music with varying focuses
20:00-22:00	Mon-Fri		Varied programming, concerts by NDR ensembles, opera, radio features, radio plays, new music
22:05-22:35	Mon-Fri	Am Abend vorgelesen	Literary works read in installments as a serial story
22:35-24:00	Mon-Fri	NDR Kultur Neo	Classical, electronica, jazz, world music
08:40-09:00	Sundays and public holidays	Glaubenssachen	Essays and stories on religious themes
19:05-19:20	Sundays	Gedanken zur Zeit	Essays on current topics

The programs Der Morgen (The morning), Der Vormittag (The late morning) and Der Nachmittag (The afternoon) are identical in structure and character.

Between 6 a.m. and midnight, a brief news bulletin lasting approximately three minutes is broadcast on the hour; a short spoken-word segment airs at the quarter-past and quarter-to marks; and a slightly longer spoken-word segment focusing on culture is presented on the half-hour. Following the 8 a.m., 12 p.m. and 5 p.m. news broadcasts, a seven-minute short program titled Kultur aktuell (Culture Update) is broadcast, featuring an average of three pre-recorded segments.

The programming on Saturdays and Sundays differs from that on weekdays. On weekends, there is an increased broadcast of listener-request programs, as well as shows covering cultural and arts-related topics, spiritual themes and sacred music (the latter primarily during the morning hours).

== Popular programs ==
The podcast eat.READ.sleep, which reviews books, is broadcast as a regular bi-weekly radio program on NDR Kultur.

== Criticism ==
Public criticism arose following a change to the programming schedule, under which, among other things, only individual movements of classical works were generally broadcast during the daytime schedule. This criticism was directed against a "dumbing down" of the programming and maintain that it remains necessary to broadcast complete classical works during the day.

== Reception ==
The station is available in Lower Saxony, Hamburg, Schleswig-Holstein and Mecklenburg-Vorpommern via FM and DAB+, and beyond this broadcast area via Astra (DVB-S) and the internet (live stream). In the state of Bremen, the availability depends on various factors; in Lower Saxony, for instance, the broadcast originates from Steinkimmen. The most powerful FM transmitter in Germany is used in Rostock.

=== FM ===
- 87.8 MHz (Visselhövede)
- 88.0 MHz (Lübeck)
- 88.2 MHz (Rostock-Toitenwinkel)
- 89.2 MHz (Schwerin)
- 89.9 MHz (Bungsberg)
- 89.9 MHz (Torfhaus (Harz))
- 90.0 MHz (Aurich)
- 90.2 MHz (Lingen)
- 90.8 MHz (Hann. Münden)
- 91.5 MHz (Rügen)
- 91.8 MHz (Demmin)
- 93.3 MHz (Dannenberg)
- 94.3 MHz (Sylt)
- 94.4 MHz (Steinkimmen)
- 94.6 MHz (Cuxhaven)
- 94.7 MHz (Röbel)
- 95.1 MHz (Goslar)
- 95.7 MHz (Bad Pyrmont)
- 95.7 MHz (Kiel)
- 96.0 MHz (Helpterberg)
- 96.1 MHz (Flensburg)
- 96.5 MHz (Alfeld)
- 96.8 MHz (Göttingen)
- 97.0 MHz (Heligoland)
- 98.4 MHz (Holzminden)
- 98.7 MHz (Hanover)
- 98.8 MHz (Osnabrück)
- 99.2 MHz (Hamburg)
- 99.4 MHz (Heide)
- 102.7 MHz (Heringsdorf)
- 104.4 MHz (Stadthagen)

=== DAB+ ===
- 6C (Braunschweig)
- 6C (Oldenburg)
- 7A (Hanover)
- 8B (Greifswald)
- 8D (Cuxhaven)
- 9A (Lübeck)
- 9B (Lüneburg)
- 9C (Kiel)
- 10A (Hamburg)
- 10A (Osnabrück)
- 10C (Neubrandenburg)
- 10C (Norderstedt)
- 11B (Heide)
- 11B (Rostock)
- 11D (Pasewalk)
- 12B (Flensburg)
- 12B (Schwerin)

=== Satellite ===
Astra 1H (19.2° East) Tr. 39
