= Radio Hamburg =

Private radio station based in Hamburg, Germany

Coordinates: 53.550°N 9.996°E

- Mehr Musik, mehr Vielfalt (More music, more diversity)
- Hamburg; Germany
- Broadcast area: Hamburg; Schleswig-Holstein
- Frequencies: FM: 103.6 MHz; 88.5 MHz (Neuwerk); DAB+: Various
- RDS: RADIO_HH

Programming
- Language: German
- Format: Hot adult contemporary

History
- First air date: 31 December 1986; 39 years ago
- Former frequencies: FM: 95.0 MHz (until 1988); 104.0 MHz (city frequency until September 2020)

Links
- Website: Listen live

Radio Hamburg is a private commercial radio station based on Hamburg, Germany. Launched on December 31, 1986, it was the first private radio station in Hamburg and one of the first private radio stations in West Germany. Radio Hamburg is also notable for becoming the first private radio station in Germany to carry Casey Kasem's American Top 40 during its early heyday.

Radio Hamburg GmbH is owned by Hamburg-based Axel Springer SE, Bauer Media Group, RTL Group and some minor shareholders. MORE Marketing GmbH is its own advertising marketer company. The CEO of Radio Hamburg is Patrick Bernstein.

Since August 2008, Radio Hamburg has been broadcast from the Semperhaus in Hamburg. The Semperhaus facility also supports other stations in the RTL Group, such as Hamburg Zwei. Radio Hamburg is listened to by more than one million people daily.

== Owner ==
	Ownership Share	Determinational Share
Axel Springer SE	35,00 %	25,00 %
RTL Group	29,17 %	33,60 %
Heinrich Bauer Verlag KG	25,00 %	28,80 %
Lühmanndruck Harburger Zeitungsgesellschaft mbH & Co. KG	5,83 %	6,80 %
Morgenpost Verlag GmbH	5,00 %	5,80 %

== Program ==
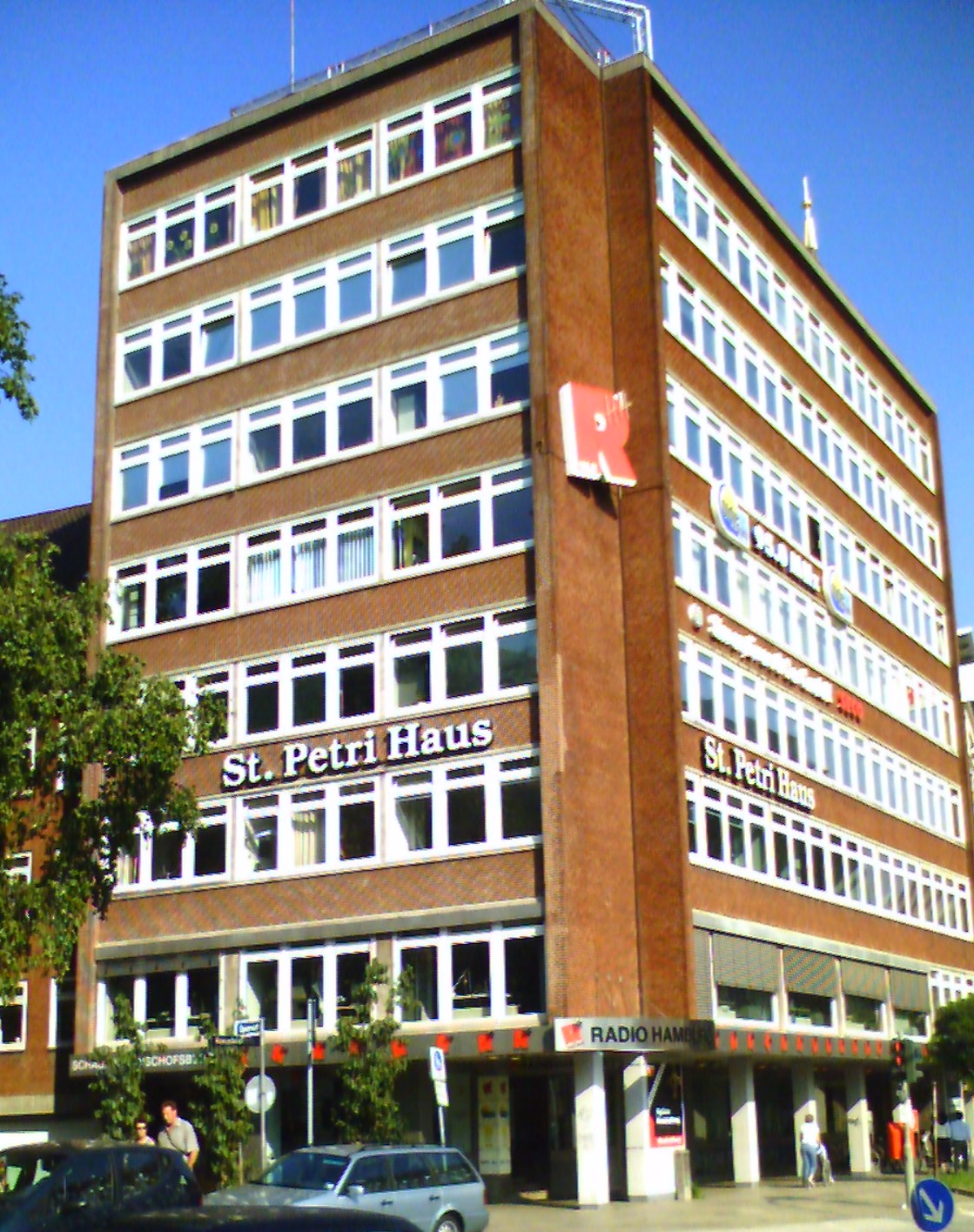
The former Radio Hamburg building, the St. Petri Haus

Radio Hamburg plays a Hot AC format with the slogan "More music, more diversity". The most popular show is the morning show from 5 to 10 am.

The "Easter Mega Hit Marathon," broadcast since 1989, features 800 "Mega Hits" over the course of 24–48 hours during Easter. It is usually held in the biggest arena in Hamburg, the Volksparkstadion or close by.

== Distribution ==
Radio Hamburg broadcasts in and around Hamburg via FM broadcasting and in Hamburg and Schleswig-Holstein via DAB+. Radio Hamburg also distributes its program via livestreaming, Smart speakers and a Radio Hamburg App.
