= Bungsberg telecommunications tower =

Telecommunications tower

Coordinates: 54.209451°N 10.724126°E

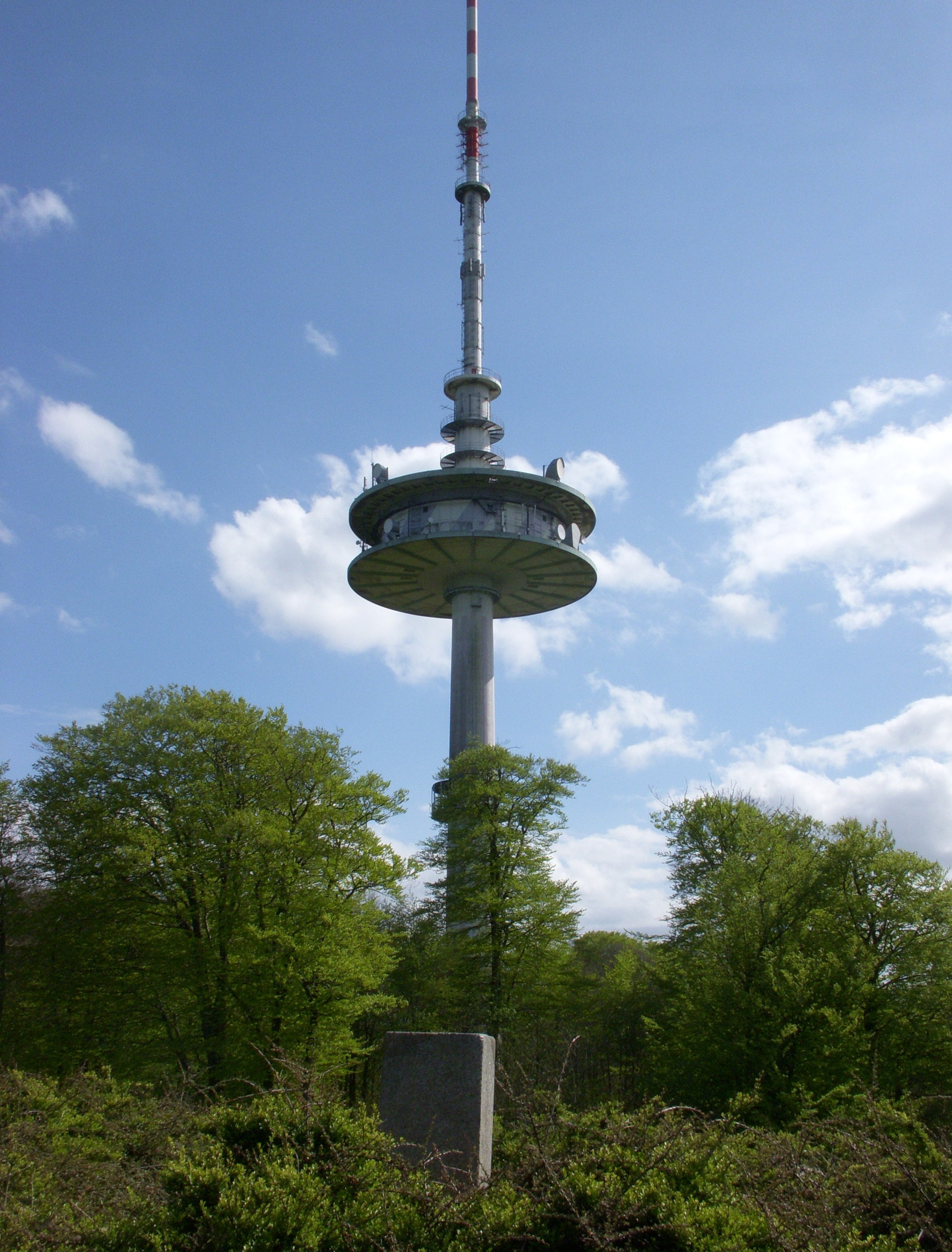
Bungsberg Fernmeldeturm 2012.

The Bungsberg telecommunications tower, also known as the Fernmeldeturm Schönwalde, is a 179-metre-high telecommunications tower situated on the Bungsberg, a hill which (at 168 metres above mean sea level) is the highest point in the north German state of Schleswig-Holstein.

The tower, which belongs to Deutsche Telekom, is used for directional radio links, FM radio and television transmissions (see the list of frequencies below) and mobile telephony services. Constructed of concrete, weighing some 6000 tonnes, and having a diameter at its base of 8.4 metres, the tower is equipped with a public observation deck at a height of 40 metres, accessible by an internal staircase.

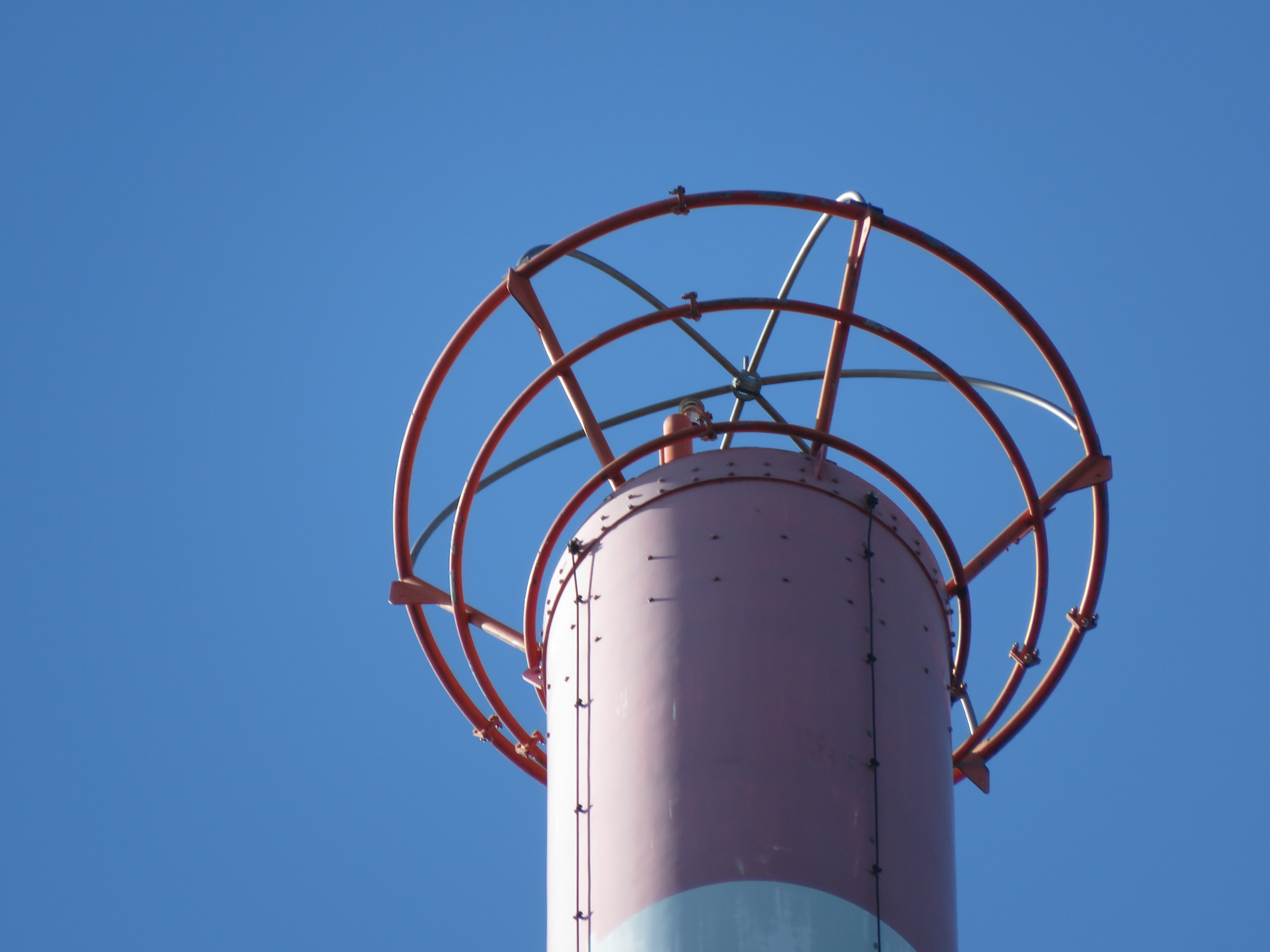
Top part of Bungsberg telecommunications tower.

The telecommunications tower was not the first tower incorporating a viewing platform to be erected on the Bungsberg. An 18-metre-high observation tower, the Elisabethenturm, had been built earlier, in 1861. This tower, extended to a height of 22 metres in 1864, is still standing, although closed to the public since the opening of the telecommunications tower.

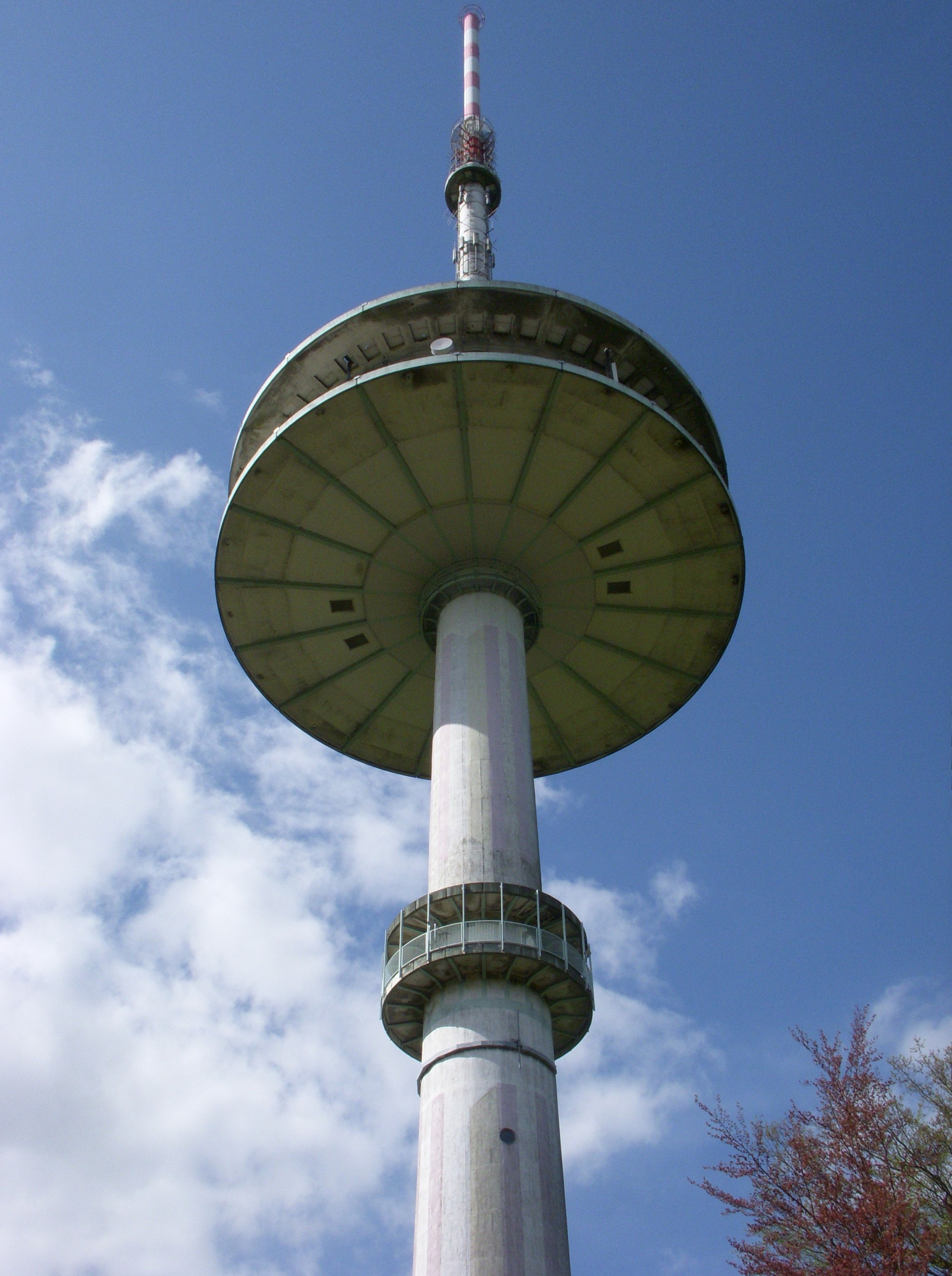
Bungsberg telecommunications tower from below.

== other towers ==
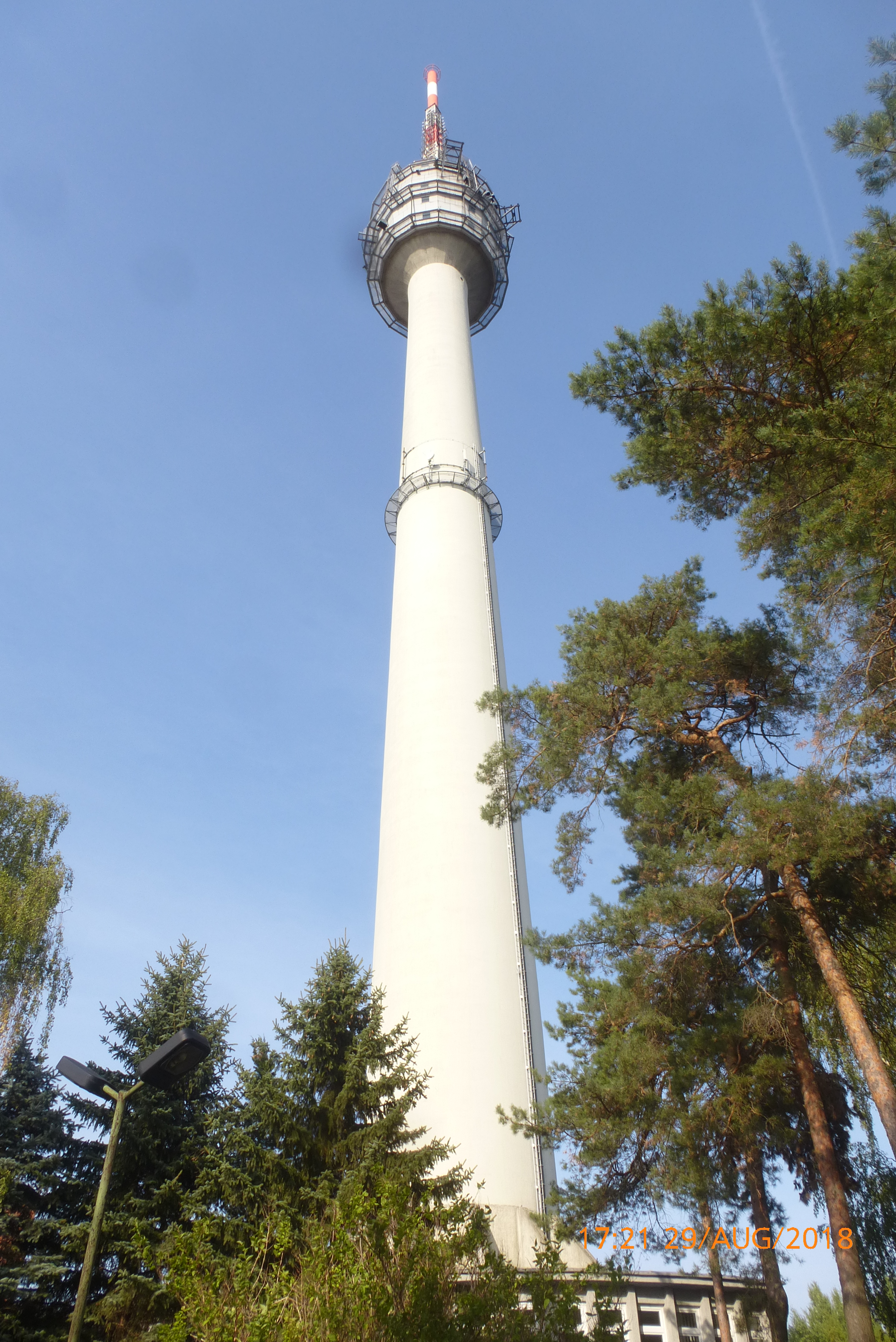
The dequede tower in Osterburg, Germany, from below.

Telecommunication Tower Bungsberg is used for transmitting the 2 and 3rd German TV-programme and the programmes of privately owned TV stations.

Name of transmitter	Frequency	ERP
Klassik Radio	97.2 MHz	0.2 kW
R.SH	100.2 MHz	50 kW
DLF	101.9 MHz	95 kW
DLR Berlin	103.1 MHz	0.3 kW
Delta Radio	104.1 MHz	50 kW
Radio Nora	106.2 MHz	0.2 kW
ZDF TV	Ch E21	235 kW
3 (NDR region)	Ch E47	235 kW
SAT1 TV	Ch E31	280 kW
RTL TV	Ch E44	280 kW

== NDR-transmitter ==
Close to Telecommunication Tower Bungsberg the NDR operates since 1960 a transmission site. It uses in opposite to the site of the Deutsche Telekom a 231-metre-tall (758 ft) guyed mast, which is the tallest structure in Schleswig Holstein. Between 1960 and 2005 a guyed steel-tube mast was in use. As this mast was not capable to carry antennas for DVB-T, it was replaced in 2004 by a guyed lattice steel mast of the same height nearby. The old mast was dismantled in 2006.

This mast is used for transmitting the first program of NDR and the following FM-radio programmes of NDR.

Name of transmitter	Frequency	ERP
NDR Kultur	89.9 MHz	50 kW
NDR 2	91.9 MHz	50 kW
NDR Info	96.6 MHz	1 kW
NDR Welle Nord	97.8 MHz	50 kW
N-Joy	99 MHz	0.5 kW
ARD (NDR region) TV	Ch E50	260 kW

== Google Map Views ==
- Telecommunication Tower Bungsberg on Google Maps
- NDR-transmitter on Google Maps
