= Kronshagen =

- Municipality
- Coat of arms

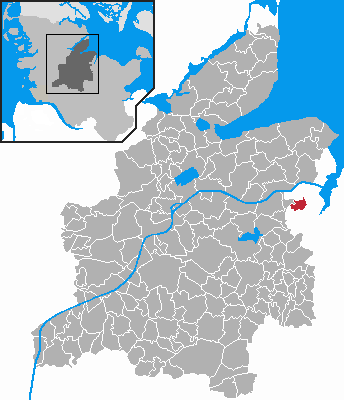
- Location of Kronshagen within Rendsburg-Eckernförde district
- Interactive map of Kronshagen
- Location within Germany Location within Schleswig-Holstein
- Coordinates: 54°20′N 10°5′E
- Country: Germany
- State: Schleswig-Holstein
- District: Rendsburg-Eckernförde

Government
  - Mayor: Ingo Sander (CDU)

Area
  - Total: 5.34 km^{2} (2.06 sq mi)
- Elevation: 14 m (46 ft)

Population (2025-12-31)
  - Total: 12,195
  - Density: 2,280/km^{2} (5,910/sq mi)
- Time zone: UTC+01:00 (CET)
  - Summer (DST): UTC+02:00 (CEST)
- Postal codes: 24119
- Dialling codes: 0431
- Vehicle registration: RD
- Website: www.kronshagen.de

Kronshagen (German pronunciation: [kʁoːnsˈhaːɡn̩]) is a municipality in the district of Rendsburg-Eckernförde, in Schleswig-Holstein, Germany. It is situated approximately 23 km southeast of Eckernförde, and 3 km west of Kiel.
