= NDR Info =

- Hamburg; Germany
- Broadcast area: Hamburg, Mecklenburg-Vorpommern, Lower Saxony, Schleswig-Holstein: FM, DAB+ National: DVB-S, DVB-C; Europe: DVB-S; Worldwide: Internet
- RDS: NDR_Info

Programming
- Language: German
- Format: News/Talk

Ownership
- Owner: Norddeutscher Rundfunk
- Sister stations: NDR 90,3; NDR 1 Niedersachsen; NDR 1 Welle Nord; NDR 1 Radio MV; NDR 2 NDR Kultur; NDR Info Spezial; N-Joy; NDR Blue; NDR Schlager

History
- First air date: April 1, 1989
- Former names: NDR 4 (1989-1996); NDR 4 Radio (1996-1998); NDR 4 Info (1998-2002)

Technical information
- Transmitter coordinates: 53.576751°N 9.992205°E

Links
- Webcast: Listen Live
- Website: www.ndr.de/info (in German)

NDR Info is a German public radio station owned and operated by the Norddeutscher Rundfunk (NDR). The headquarters is in Hamburg. It broadcasts news and current affairs 24 hours a day. Programs for kids, entertainment and comedy formats are also aired. Adrian Feuerbacher has been the program director since early 2020, succeeding Claudia Spiewak.

As of 2026, NDR Info has about 646,000 daily listeners.

== History ==
On April 1, 1989, NDR Info launched as NDR 4, a talk-based information and cultural station. From 1998 to 2004, NDR 4 (from June 2, 1998, under the name NDR 4 Info, and since 2002 under the name NDR Info) was gradually transformed into the current news station. In October 2021, the station's editorial and production departments moved from the broadcasting center on the Rothenbaumchaussee to NDR's second Hamburg location in Lokstedt.

== Reception ==
The station is available in Lower Saxony, Hamburg, Schleswig-Holstein, Mecklenburg-Vorpommern and Bremen via FM and DAB+, and beyond this broadcast area via Astra (DVB-S) and the internet (live stream).
