= Media-Analyse (Germany) =

The Media-Analyse (ma) (English: Media Analysis (MA)) by Media-Analyse AG (AGMA) is the largest annually conducted media analysis in Germany and the largest survey of media consumer behavior in Germany overall. It examines the total population as well as its subgroups. The survey occurs telephonically or with questionnaires given to a representative cross-section of the total population sample.

The yearly use of media is queried using dated surveys and daily routine studies. Initially, only the German-speaking population of Germany was questioned, limited to those living in private households which was the main place of residence, and limited to those at least 14 years old. In 2008, the age limit was reduced to ten years old and European Union foreigners were incorporated. From 2010, “other foreigners” are also now questioned. This includes approximately 50,000 young people and adults who are chosen by random selection according to the ADM sampling system. They are subsequently questioned, some in person and some telephonically (CATI). In the process, the subgroups are described based on their demographic features such as age, sex, occupation, income, religion, and community size.

The results of the media analysis are issued on behalf of AGMA by its subsidiary Media Micro Census. They have large practical relevance because they largely determine the booking behavior of the advertising industry. The MA thus indirectly determines the price a media provider can charge for advertising. It is hence regularly observed that some radio stations use a large part of their annual advertising budget during the survey period of the MA.

== MA Pressemedien ==
In MA Pressemedien (English: MA Press Media), data is obtained on magazines, daily newspapers, supplements, city magazines, KONPRESS (denominational press; church newspapers), reading circles, and cinema. MA 2006 Pressemedien II, published on July 26, 2006, noted 170 magazines. For this study, around 39,000 interviews were collectively carried out in two waves during a year (February 27, 2005 – February 4, 2006). The MA 2007 Pressemedien I appeared in January 2007.

From the Second Wave MA 2004 (September 2003 – February 2004) on, some changes in the survey method were carried out, one of which was the launch of the Title Split Method (division of the approximately 180 titles submitted into three otherwise identical questionnaire versions) as well as (first only in approximately 10% of the interviews) the CASI method.

Through the introduction of the title split models, the reach of the magazines increases over the two waves by an average of 7% - though with clear deviations for individual titles up or down. A direct comparison of historical data is hence no longer justifiable because of methodological reasons.

As so-called “media currency”, the readers per issue (LpA) was established in the MA Pressemedien. It shows how many readers an issue of a certain magazine or newspaper has.

== MA Radio ==
In MA Radio, the radio consumption for individual stations is queried. The MA Radio is conducted telephonically (the so-called CATI survey model), for which 58,011 people were questioned and appeared as MA 2006 Radio I on March 8, 2006.

As media currency, the so-called listeners per hour (for pre-determined hours) is reported as well as the average listeners per hour and the listeners per day.

== MA Plakat ==
The first MA Plakat (English: MA Placard) under the AGMA roof appeared on September 22, 2004.

On December 19, 2007 the MA 2007 Plakat was published. The coverage method of the MA Plakat was completely revised in 2007. The data is now based on a combined survey model, consisting of a CATI survey and a measurement method with a GPS receiver.

== Online Forschung AG (AGOF) ==
Since 2009, the collected Internet Facts of the Online Forschung AG (AGOF) (English: Online Research AG) also fall under the methodological responsibility of the MA.

AGOF records internet usage behavior with the Three Pillar Model:

- First Pillar: Technical measurement (computer-level, units are individual visits and page views, obtained by IP Address)
- Second Pillar: On-site surveys (Population is all internet users over 14 years old, reference to users in front of the computer, online questionnaires by pop-up window, query to place of use, time of use, sociodemographic data)
- Third Pillar: Phone surveys (CATI, population-level)

== MA Intermedia ==
In the fall of each year, MA Intermedia also appears, in which information for magazines, newspapers, TV, and radio is summarized.

== General queries ==
In addition to media use, sociodemographic characteristics, leisure time behavior, and shopping behavior are collected. The questionnaire is largely identical to all MA studies (Press Media, Radio, Daily Newspaper).

== Licenses ==
The current data is only at the disposal of members of the Media-Analyse AG eV (publishing houses, radio stations, advertising agencies, advertisers, etc.). However, one can create a free individual query, e.g. about advertising departments of the publishing houses.

== Publication ==
The Media-Analyse appears twice per year for Pressemedien and Radio, and once per year for Tageszeitungen (English: Daily Newspapers) and Plakat. In Nordrhein-Westfalen, the MA Radio is expanded for local radio stations through the E.M.A. NRW, while in Bavaria, it is expanded through the Radio Analysis.

The first Leser-Analyse (English: Reader Analysis) appeared in 1954, and thus AGMA celebrated its 50-year anniversary in 2004.

== Further analysis files ==
A whole series of further market and media studies of different providers are based on the MA-determined reach results, among them the TdW (Typologie der Wünsche (English: Typology of Desires) by Hubert Burda Media), VA (Verbraucher-Analyse (English: Consumer Analysis) by Axel Springer Publishers and Bauer Publishers), Communication Networks (Focus Magazine Publishers), MarkenProfile (English: BrandsProfile), VuMA, etc.
