= DVB-S =

1995 digital TV standard for satellite television

Digital Video Broadcasting – Satellite (DVB-S) is the original DVB standard for satellite television and dates from 1995, in its first release, while development lasted from 1993 to 1997. The first commercial applications were by Canal+ in France and Galaxy in Australia, enabling digitally broadcast, satellite-delivered television to the public. According to ETSI,

DVB-S was the first DVB standard for satellite, defining the framing structure, channel coding and modulation for 11/12 GHz satellite services.

It is used via satellites serving every continent of the world. DVB-S is used in both multiple channel per carrier (MCPC) and single channel per carrier modes for broadcast network feeds as well as for direct-broadcast satellite services like Sky UK and Ireland via Astra in Europe, Dish Network and Globecast in the U.S. and Bell Satellite TV in Canada.

While the actual DVB-S standard only specifies physical link characteristics and framing, the overlaid transport stream delivered by DVB-S is mandated as MPEG-2, known as MPEG transport stream (MPEG-TS).

Some amateur television repeaters also use this mode in the 1.2 GHz amateur band.

== General references ==
- "Specifications". DVB. 2024.
- Digital Video Broadcasting (DVB); Framing structure, channel coding and modulation for 11/12 GHz satellite services (PDF) (European Standard). Telecommunications. Valbonne, France: European Telecommunications Standards Institute (ETSI). 1997.
