= Candidstraße =

Street in Munich, Germany

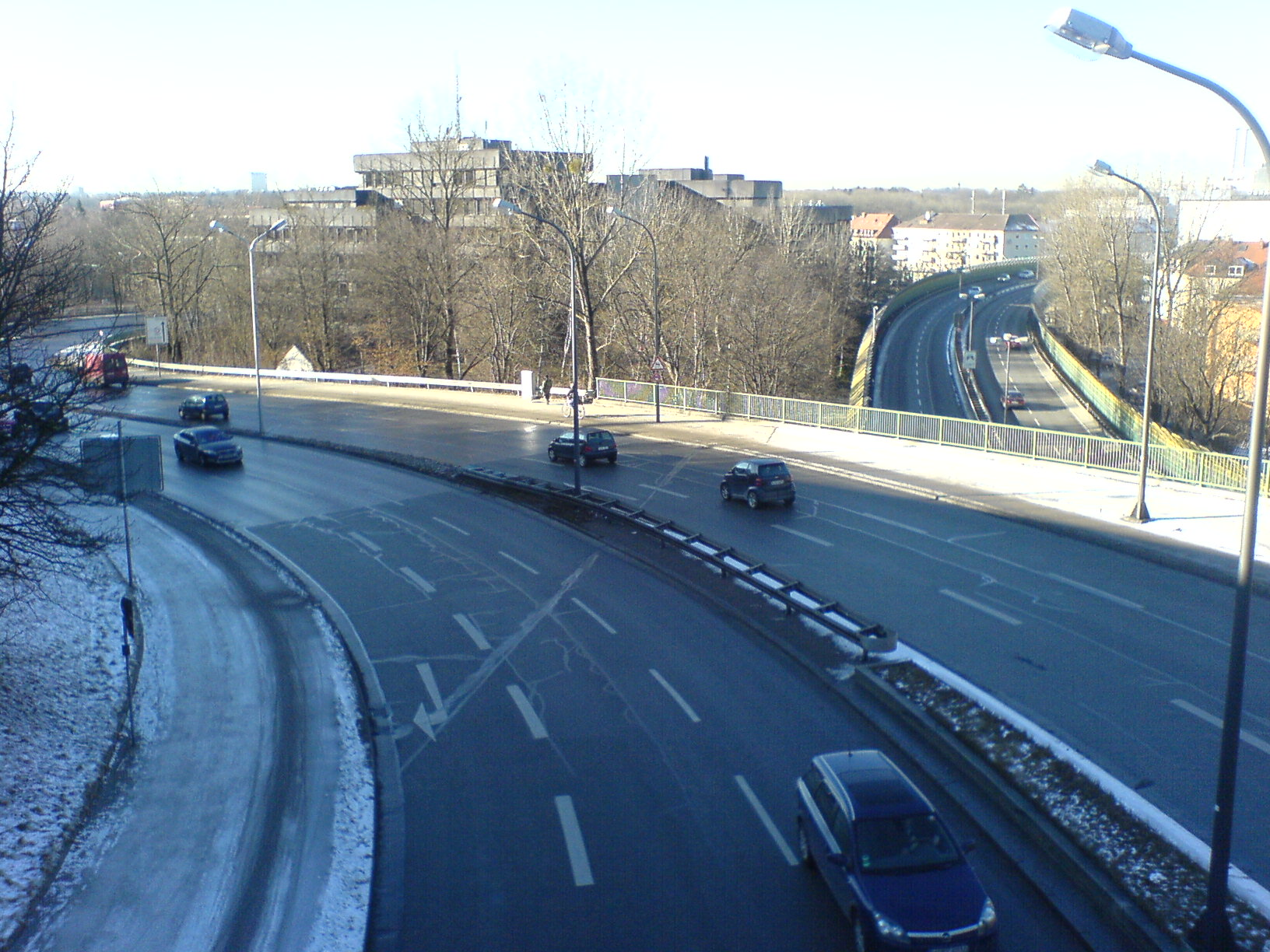
The two branches of the Candid road, in the foreground a part of the S-loop leading up the slope, behind it the elevated road leading into the Candid tunnel

Candidstraße is an inner-city street in Munich and a section of the Mittlerer Ring.

== Location ==
Candidstraße is located in the Munich district Untergiesing in the district 18, Untergiesing-Harlaching. It connects Brudermühlstraße with Tegernseer Landstraße.

== Course ==
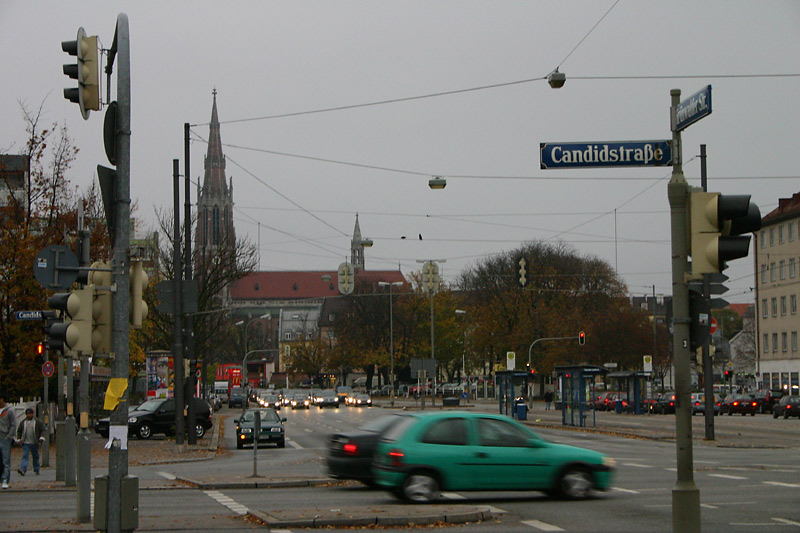
Candidstraße and Tegernseer Landstraße-Grünwalder Straße

Candidstraße connects seven lanes to the Brudermühlbrücke bridge. Of the four lanes running in the eastern direction, the outer two become turning lanes to Candidplatz, in the opposite direction there is an access lane from Candidplatz. This leaves four lanes for the continuous part of the Mittlerer Ring.

At Candidplatz, Candidstraße is connected to the Pilgersheimer Straße - Schönstraße axis, which runs roughly parallel to the Isar in a north-south direction. East of Candidplatz, Candidstraße has to cross the Isar slope (Candidberg). The road is divided into two parts.

At ground level, a six-lane road runs in serpentines upwards along the slope and there serves as a connection to the Tegernseer Landstraße, which runs north along the edge of the slope, and the Grünwalder Straße, which runs south. This branch runs past the Grünwalder Stadion.

The four-lane part, comprising the Mittlere Ring, crosses the Candidplatz and the Auer Mühlbach as an elevated through road (called Candidhochstraße or Candidbrücke) and then connects with the Isar slope below the serpentine of the first branch. From there, the road runs in four lanes in the Candidtunnel to the eastern part of the Tegernseer Landstraße, which here is led in a ditch. The elevated road has noise barriers painted yellow-green on both sides. A photovoltaic system is installed on the southern wall.

The Bäcker-Kunstmühle (former gristmill), demolished in 1973, was located in the loop between the street at ground level and the Hochstraße. Today, the Kraftwerk Bäckermühle (power station) and a medical and office centre are located on the site.

== History ==
The construction of Candidstraße with the access to Tegernseer Landstraße and Grünwalder Straße took place between 1955 and 1957. The construction of Candidbrücke and Candidtunnel for the crossing between Candidplatz and Grünwalder Straße followed between 1967 and 1969.

== Naming ==
Candidstraße, Candidtunnel and Candidplatz are named after Peter Candid, a Flemish painter and graphic artist who lived and worked in Munich from 1586 to 1628.
