= Ulrich R. J. Kubak =

German radio entrepreneur

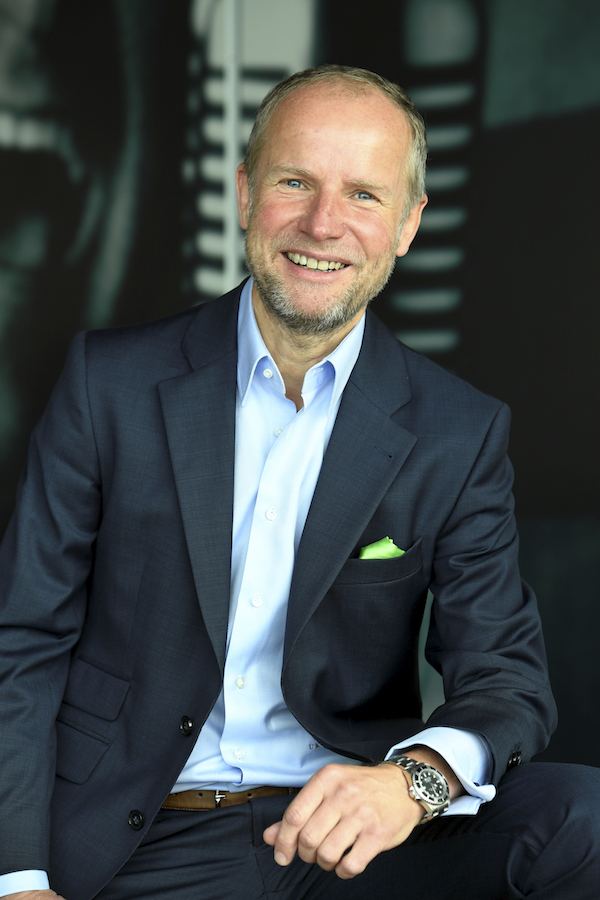
- Ulrich R. J. Kubak
- Born: September 30, 1965 (age 61); Augsburg
- Known for: Klassik Radio

Ulrich R. J. Kubak (born September 30, 1965 in Augsburg) is a German entrepreneur and owner of the German classical music radio station Klassik Radio.

== Life ==
Kubak was born and raised in Augsburg, Germany. His father was the German organ builder Rudolf Kubak. Shortly before his graduation from school he got hold of the licence for a local youth radio station and founded Radio Fantasy in 1987. After a few years he sold the station and founded the FM Radio Network GmbH in 1989, offering content to radio stations all over the nation. In 1993, Kubak founded Firstnews, the first web-based news agency in Germany. Kubak sold 51% of FM Radio Network GmbH to the RTL Group in 1995, but bought it back in 2002.

The best known shows produced by FM Radio Network were "Die wahre Geschichte" (The true Story), "Hollywood Affairs" and "Franz Beckenbauers Bundesligaradio", a show presented by the former German football player Franz Beckenbauer.

Kubak purchased the majority of the Klassik Radio in 1999 and the rest of the company in 2002, before going public with Klassik Radio in 2004. The headquarter of the Klassik Radio AG is in the Mediatower, close to Augsburg’s central station. Until 2016 the content was produced in Hamburg, since then the morning show is produced in Augsburg, from Germany's highest located radio-studio.

In 2017 Kubak presented the streaming service Klassik Radio Select (KRS), where renowned classical musicians and experts curate stations with classical music. 2018 Kubak bought the Forsterhaus in Augsburg, which was the city-archive before, and plans to make it the new headquarter of his company, including studios and space for events.

In 2009, the BergLodge was opened in Nesselwang. Kubak bought the building and had it renovated to be a luxury resort, he sold it to the local community in 2018. Kubak was rewarded with the Bayerische Denkmalschutzmedaille in 2013 for the restoration of a former school building he bought 1995 in Siebenbrunn.

== Publications ==
Ulrich R.J. Kubak (Publisher), Franz Häußler: Siebenbrunn – Augsburgs wasserreicher Stadtteil, German, Context-Verlag, Augsburg
