= Harlachinger Quellbach =

Small stream near Tierpark Hellabrunn in Munich, Germany

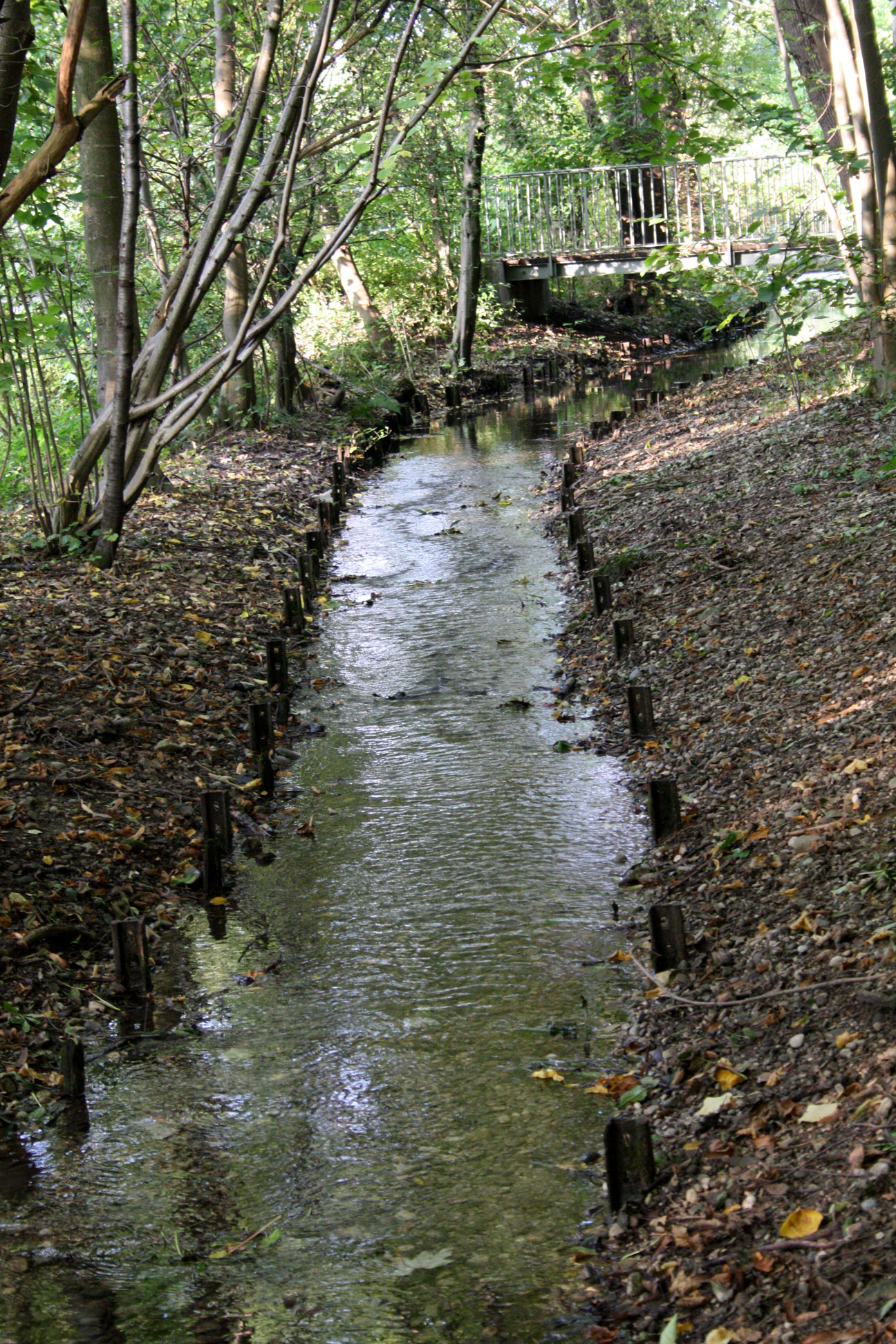

Location
- Country: Germany
- States: Bavaria

Physical characteristics
- Mouth
  - location: Auer Mühlbach
  - coordinates: 48.1022°N 11.5633°E

Basin features
- Progression: Auer Mühlbach→ Isar→ Danube→ Black Sea

Harlachinger Quellbach (also: Siebenbrunner Bächl) is a small river of Bavaria, Germany. It flows into the Auer Mühlbach, a branch of the Isar, in Munich-Harlaching.

== See also ==
- List of rivers of Bavaria
