= River City (building) =

Building in Chicago, Illinois

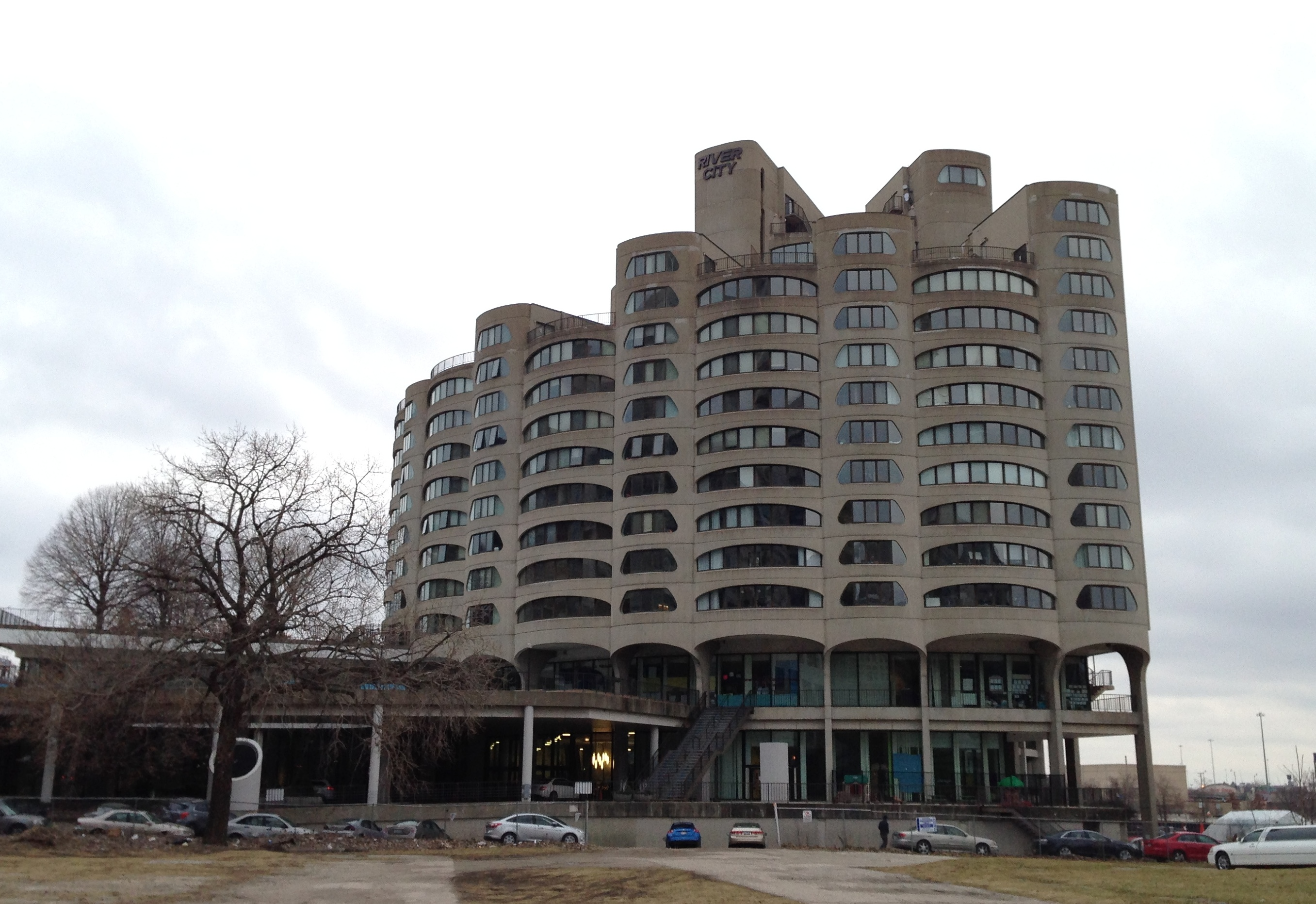
- River City viewed from the north.
- Interactive map of the River City area

General information
- Type: Residential; commercial; parking; marina
- Location: 800 South Wells Street, Chicago, Illinois, United States
- Coordinates: 41.871399°N 87.634522°W
- Completed: 1986

Design and construction
- Architect: Bertrand Goldberg

River City is a mixed-use building at 800 South Wells Street in the South Loop neighborhood of Chicago, Illinois. Completed in 1986, it was designed by Bertrand Goldberg and shares elements with his design for Marina City.

== Development and history ==
River City is situated alongside the Chicago River and consists of two 7- to 14-story, serpentine residential towers constructed of reinforced, poured-in-place concrete "shells" with 449 residential units, varying in size from studios to 4-bedroom penthouses. The towers sit on a 4-story post-and-beam "plinth" that contains approximately 225,000 square feet (20,900 m^{2}) of commercial and office space, including a 50,000 sq ft (4,600 m^{2}) health club with full-size pool, an underground, indoor parking lot, and a 70-slip marina with a bubbler system that prevents freezing and permits year-round use. The roof of the base structure is a transfer floor that holds Skyline Park, a 1-acre, landscaped private park for the residents; as well as River Road, a 10-story, enclosed, skylighted atrium between the two residential towers.

River City was originally conceived on a much larger scale. It was to consist of a series of 72-story mixed-use skyscrapers, clustered in groups of three, and joined every 18 stories by triangular platforms containing resident services. The architect called these clusters “triads”. The complex was intended to be capable of housing as many as 30,000 families, the grand culmination of Goldberg's utopian vision of a "city within a city". He had an expansive conception of the responsibilities of a residential developer and planned to provide an extensive range of services to residents from medical clinics to educational and training facilities for “lifelong learning”. Goldberg was unable to secure approval for this ambitious project from Chicago's Plan Commission, however. The project went through various re-designs over the next decade, ultimately resulting in the scaled-down current structure. Goldberg and the developers made plans to expand River City to the north and south, but were unable to acquire financing for additions to the building.

The residential portion was converted to condominiums in 2001–2006 by American Invsco. In December 2018, the building was acquired by investors intent on converting the condominiums back into rental apartments. In 2019, the new owners started extensive renovations to prepare the building for rentals. Architectural preservationists complained when the raw concrete interior of the "River Road" atrium was painted white. The controversy prompted Bertrand Goldberg's son, Geoffrey, himself an architect, to publish an essay in which he called the change a “diminution” of the original architect's intention for the building's design.

== In popular media ==
In the 2014 film Divergent, the set for “Abnegation” was built on the vacant land immediately north of River City. In the film, River City appears to loom over the modest housing of Abnegation.

In the 2006 film Stranger than Fiction, Will Ferrell's character moves into a co-worker's apartment in River City. The apartment used for filming was 1702/1704, a 3-bedroom triplex where architect Bertrand Goldberg briefly lived combined with a studio apartment.

== Gallery ==
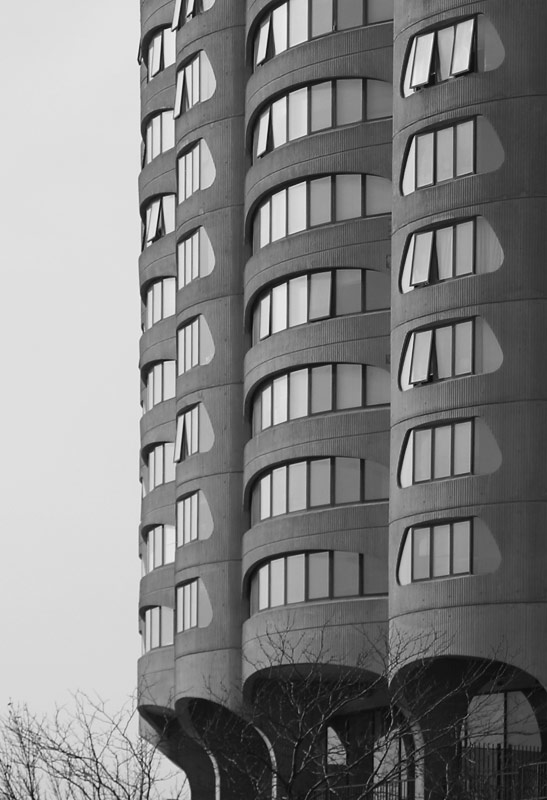

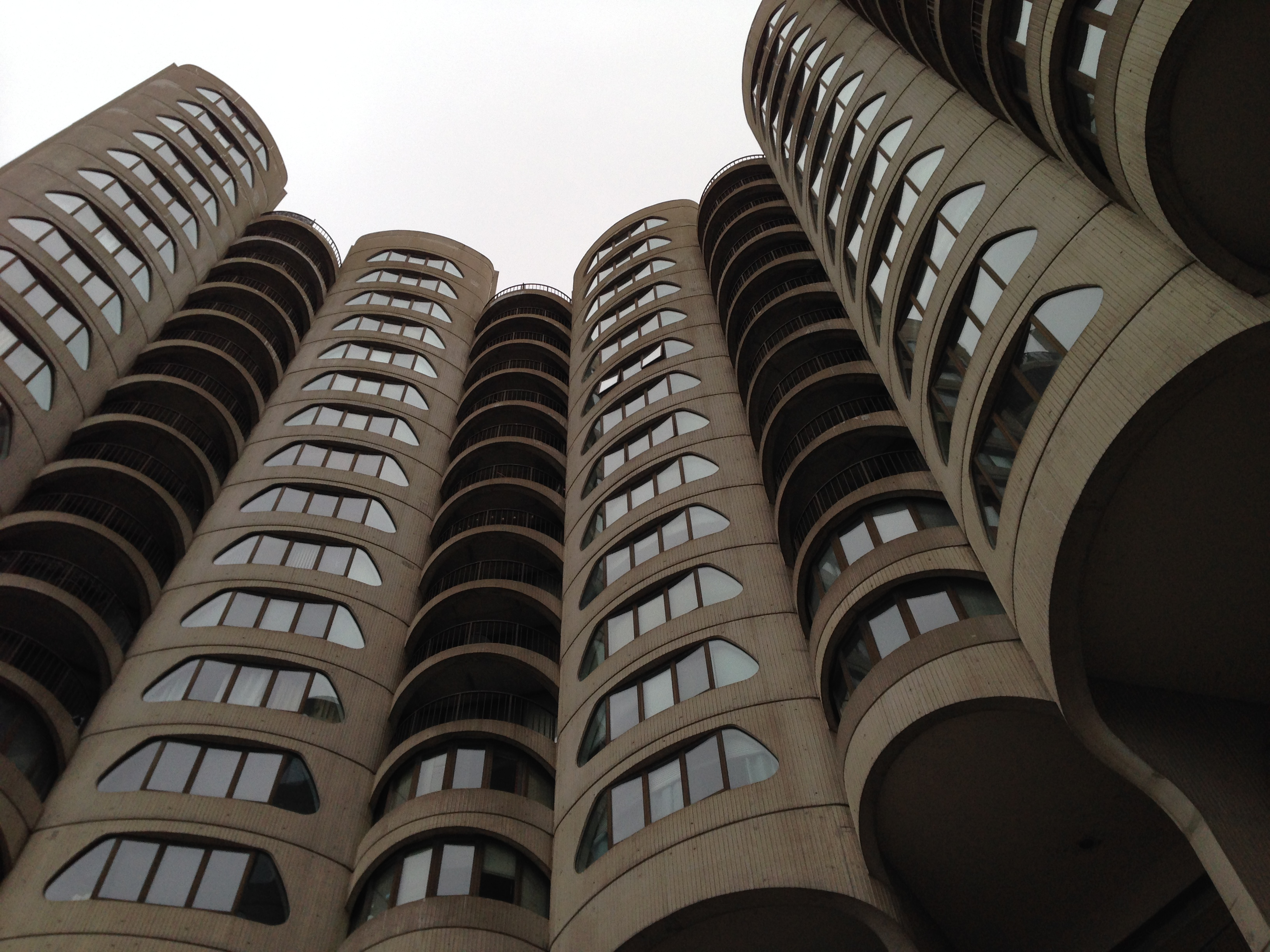
