= Bertrand Goldberg =

American architect (1913–1997)

- Born: July 17, 1913; Chicago, Illinois
- Died: October 8, 1997 (age 84)
- Occupation: Architect
- Spouse: Nancy Florsheim
- Children: Lisa Goldberg; Nan Goldberg; Geoffrey Goldberg

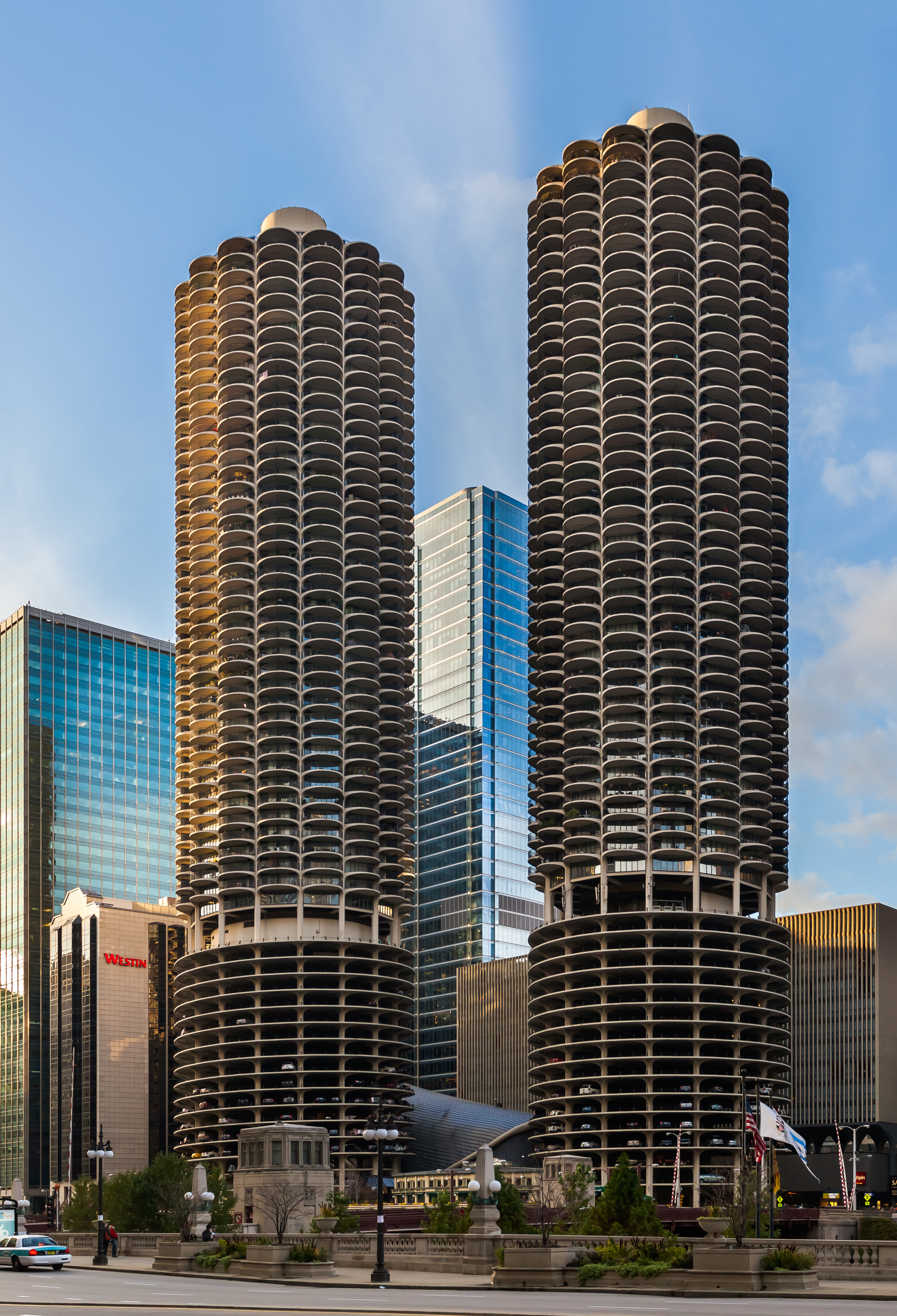
Marina City, Chicago

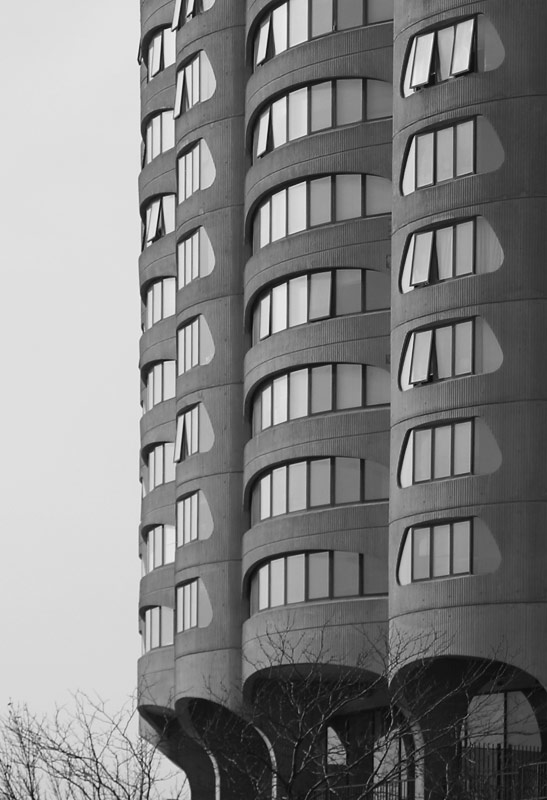
River City, Chicago

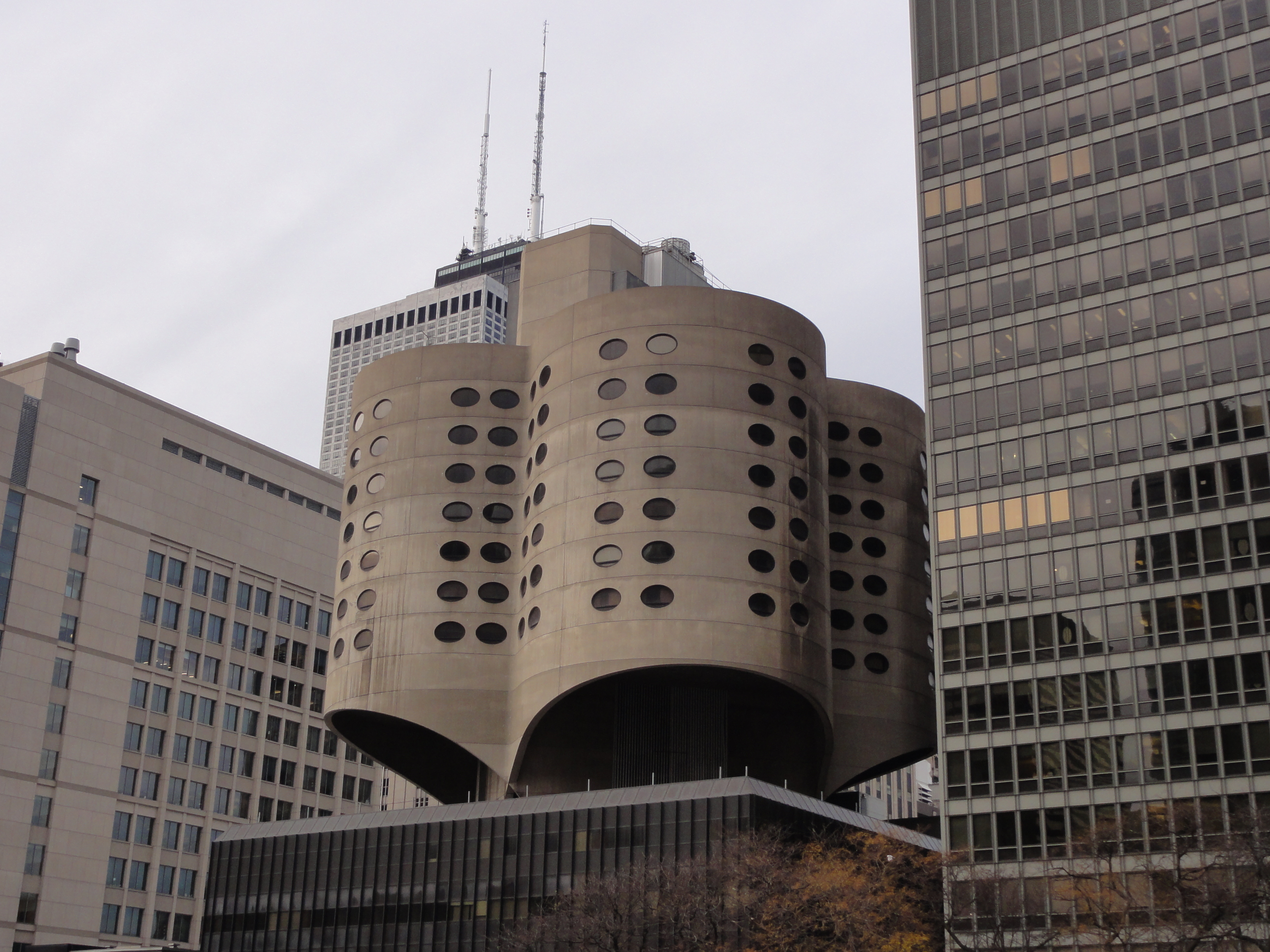
Old Prentice Women's Hospital Chicago

Bertrand Goldberg (July 17, 1913 – October 8, 1997) was an American architect and industrial designer, best known for the Marina City complex in Chicago, Illinois, the tallest reinforced concrete building in the world at the time of completion.

== Life and career ==
Goldberg was born in Chicago, and trained at the Cambridge School of Landscape Architecture (now part of Harvard University). At age eighteen, in 1932, he went to Germany to study at the Bauhaus, working in the small office of architect Ludwig Mies van der Rohe. Following civil unrest in Berlin, Goldberg fled to Paris in 1933 and soon returned to Chicago, where he enrolled at the Armour Institute of Technology. Goldberg began his career in the offices of modernist architects Keck and Keck, Paul Schweikher, and Howard T. Fisher. In 1937, Goldberg opened his own architectural office in Chicago.

Goldberg was known for innovative structural solutions to complex problems, particularly for residential, institutional, and industrial design projects. One of Goldberg's first commissions, in 1938, was for the North Pole chain of ice cream shops. His ingenious design allowed the small shops to be disassembled, transported, and reassembled with little effort. Its flat roof was supported by tension wires from a single, illuminated column rising up through the shop's center; glass windows and a door formed a box below the roof.

During his career, Goldberg designed a rear-engine automobile, canvas houses, unique furniture, prefabricated houses, and mobile vaccine laboratories for the United States government. He collaborated on some projects with his friend and fellow 'design scientist' R. Buckminster Fuller, as well as other modernists. Goldberg's experimental plywood boxcars, demountable housing units for military use during and after World War II, led him to seek unconventional forms through mundane materials such as plywood and concrete. In the late 1930s, Goldberg was present at the famous meeting of Frank Lloyd Wright and Ludwig Mies van der Rohe at Taliesin. He also was friends with Josef Albers, who taught him at the Bauhaus.

In 1946, he married Nancy Florsheim, granddaughter of Milton S. Florsheim; they had two daughters, Lisa (born 1950) and Nan (born 1952), and one son, Geoffrey (born 1955).

== Marina City ==
Marina City in Chicago (1961–1964), which may be Goldberg's best-known commission, incorporated many different functions into a mixed-use complex of five buildings. The two sixty-story towers are on the river's edge, and are well known Chicago features, with striking multi-lobed columnar forms often described as "corn cobs". In addition to the towers, comprising apartments and parking, there was a complex pattern of activities that were incorporated into the original design, including an office building, theater, public pedestrian plaza, an active rail line, a marina, an ice skating rink, and a bowling alley. Much of the complex has evolved and changed over time, and the pattern of activities has shifted significantly, but with only minor changes to Goldberg's design. The office building is now a hotel, and the theater is now the Chicago House of Blues. The rail line has since been abandoned, and the skating rink has been covered by a later addition housing a steakhouse.

After the success of Marina City, Goldberg undertook many more large commissions for hospitals with similar structural features, such as the now demolished Prentice Women's Hospital for Northwestern University, science and medical complexes for SUNY Stony Brook, and the Good Samaritan Hospital in Phoenix, Arizona. Other work includes schools and other public institutional buildings such as River City and the Hilliard Homes public housing complex, both in Chicago.

After Marina City, Goldberg moved his work to focus on larger scale social, planning, and engineering issues, and proposed many progressive urban projects. Goldberg also wrote extensively on urban issues and other historical and cultural issues.

The Bertrand Goldberg Archive is held by the Ryerson & Burnham Libraries at the Art Institute of Chicago. The archive includes photographs, drawings, correspondence, and audiovisual materials.

== Work ==
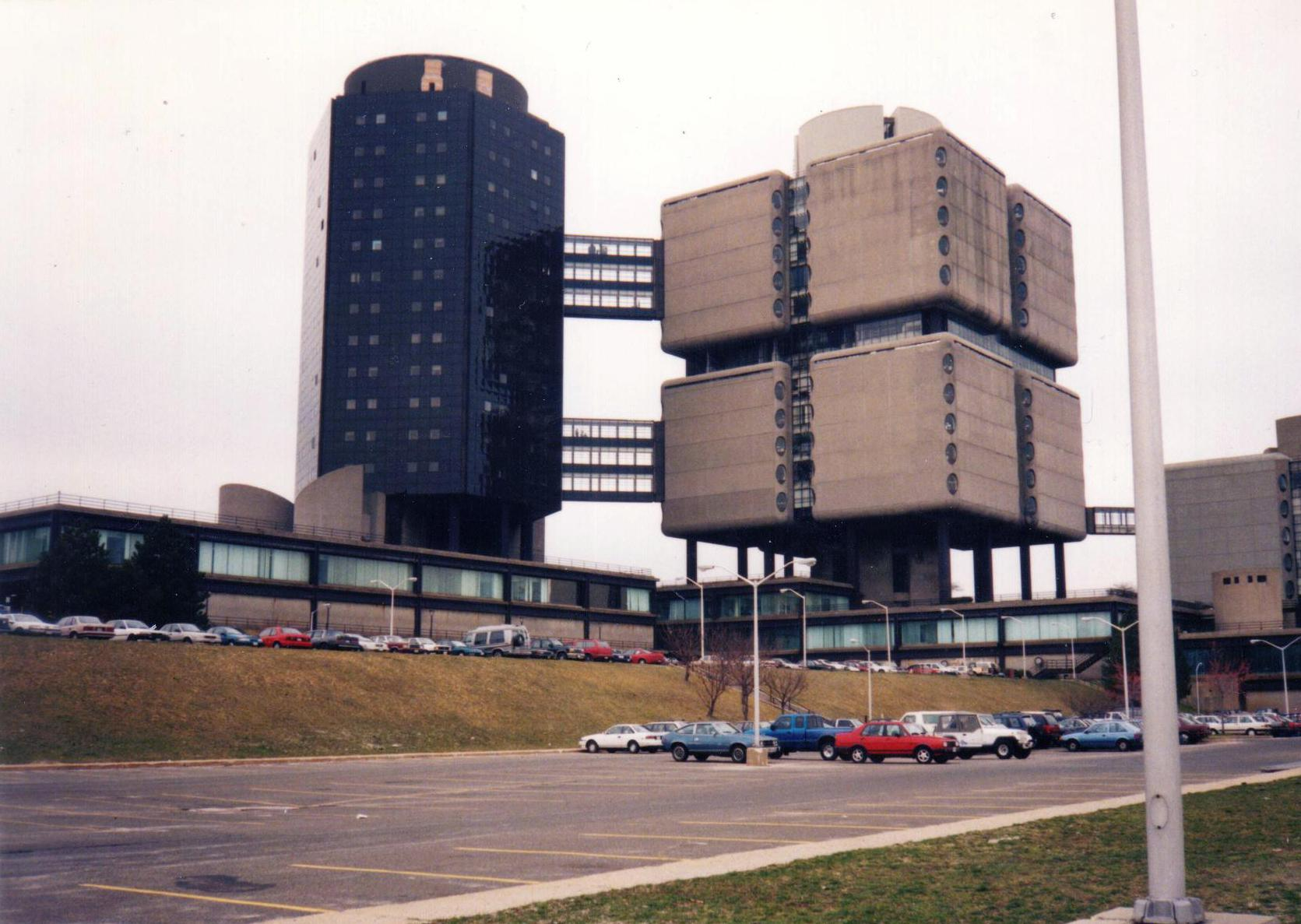
Stony Brook University Hospital, Stony Brook, New York, 1976-1980

- Harriet Higginson house in Wood Dale, Illinois, 1935
- North Pole Mobile Ice Cream Store, River Forest, Illinois, 1938
- Dr. Aaron Heimbach House, Blue Island, Illinois, 1939
- John M. van Beuren House, Morristown, New Jersey (with mural by T. Lux Feininger), 1955
- Levin House, Flossmoor, Illinois, 1956
- Pineda Island Resort, Spanish Fort, Alabama, 1959
- Happy Medium Theatre, 1959
- Astor Tower Hotel, Chicago, Illinois, 1963
- Joseph Brenneman Elementary School, Chicago, Illinois, 1963
- West Palm Beach Christian Convention Center, West Palm Beach, Florida, 1965
- Hilliard Towers Apartments, Chicago, Illinois, 1966
- Marina City, Chicago, Illinois, 1964
- Elgin Mental Health Center, Elgin, Illinois, 1967
- St. Joseph Medical Center, Tacoma, Washington, 1969
- Prentice Women's Hospital Building, Chicago, Illinois, 1975 (demolished 2013)
- Stony Brook University Hospital, Stony Brook, New York, 1976-1980
- Brigham and Women’s Hospital, Boston, MA, 1976-1980
- Good Samaritan Hospital (now Banner - University Medical Center Phoenix), Phoenix, Arizona, 1982
- River City, Chicago, Illinois, 1986
- Providence Hospital, Mobile, Alabama, 1987
- Master plan and buildings for the campus of Wilbur Wright College, Chicago, Illinois, 1993
