= St. Joseph Medical Center (Tacoma, Washington) =

Coordinates: 47°14′43″N 122°26′49″W

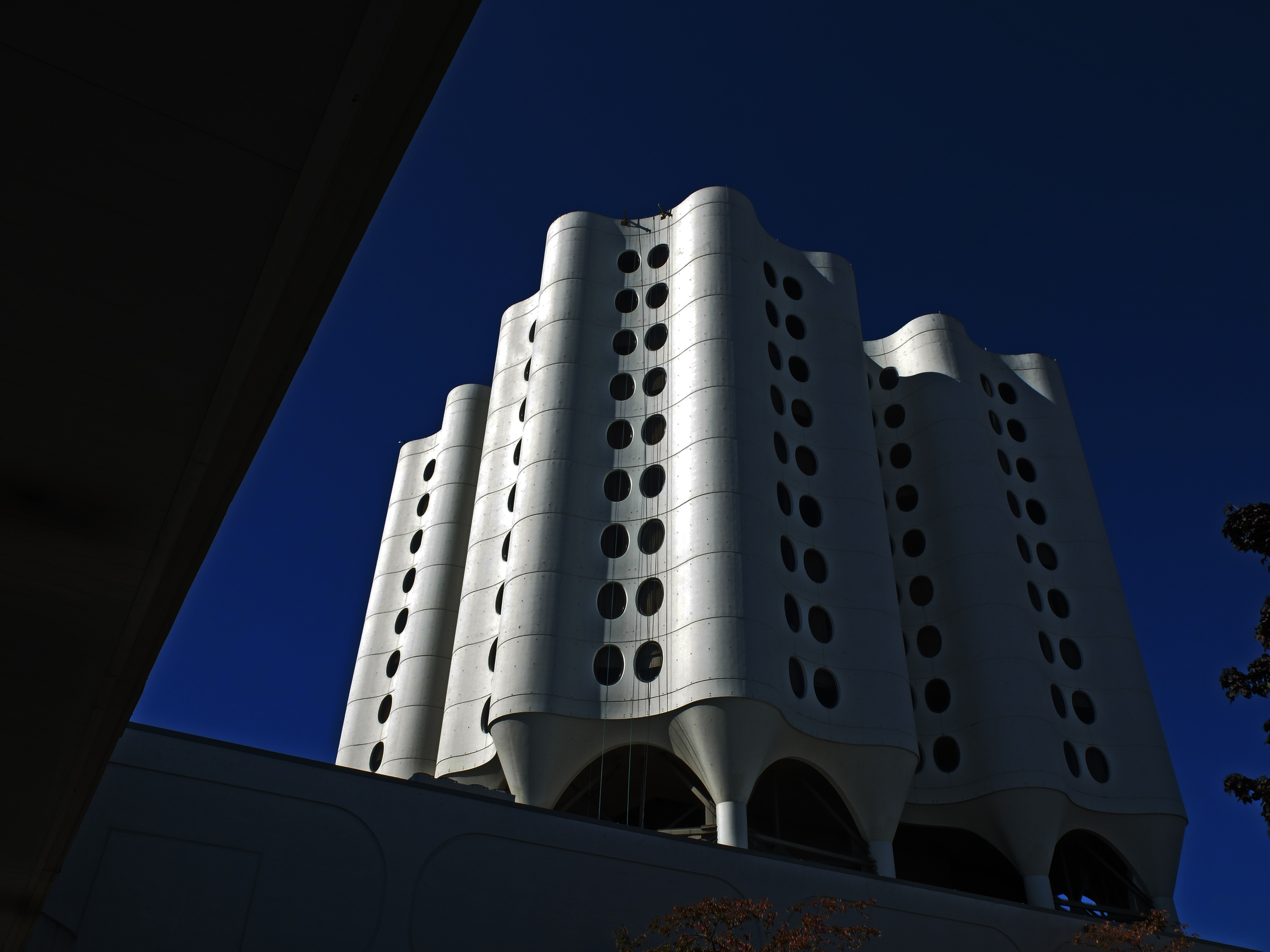

Geography
- Location: Tacoma, Washington, U.S.

Links
- Lists: Hospitals in U.S.

St. Joseph Medical Center (SJMC) is a hospital in Tacoma, Washington. Part of Virginia Mason Franciscan Health, it was the founding Washington operation of the former Franciscan Health System.

== History ==
St. Joseph Medical Center was called St. Joseph Hospital when it was established by the Sisters of St. Francis of Philadelphia in 1891. As a part of the non-profit and faith-based Franciscan Health System, the mission of St. Joseph Medical Center is "to nurture the healing ministry of the Church by bringing it new life, energy and viability in the 21st century. Fidelity to the Gospel urges us to emphasize human dignity and social justice as we move toward the creation of healthier communities."

In 1969, an expansion was undertaken by Bertrand Goldberg to provide an additional 260 beds.

In 2001, the Nisqually Earthquake rocked the Pacific Northwest with an epicenter a mere 15 miles from Tacoma, where SJMC is located. Despite fears of building failure, SJMC withstood the 6.8 magnitude quake because it is made of reinforced concrete.

== Services ==
As a Level II trauma center, SJMC's services include 24-hour emergency medical care. In 2013 the hospital opened an upgraded Level III NICU that operates in conjunction with Seattle Children's hospital. SJMC offers inpatient and outpatient medical and surgical services; heart and vascular care; orthopedic services; cancer care; diagnostic imaging; physical, speech and occupational therapies. Hospice services are offered at the Virginia Mason Franciscan Health Hospice House. Mental Health services are offered at Wellfound Behavioral Health. Rehabilitation services are offered at VMFH Rehabilitation Hospital.

The annual ED volume is reported by the staffing group to be about 47000.

== See also ==
- List of hospitals in Washington (state)
