= Klassik Radio =

Hamburg, Germany; Germany
- Broadcast area: Germany, Austria

Programming
- Language: German
- Format: Classical music, Film music, Lounge music

Ownership
- Owner: Klassik Radio AG

History
- First air date: 28 October 1990; 35 years ago

Links
- Website: www.klassikradio.de

Klassik Radio is a radio station in Germany. It specialises in classical music, Film music and Lounge music. The channel is receivable in over 300 German cities via FM, throughout Germany via cable, and in Europe via satellite. It is also worldwide streamed on the internet. At the start of the new national DAB standard DAB+ on 1 August 2011 Klassik Radio gained an additional technical range of 53.5 million households in the whole country. Klassik Radio is a subsidiary company of Klassik Radio Inc. located in Augsburg. The broadcasting centre is based in Hamburg.

The music Klassik Radio is broadcasting can be described as relaxation music which consists mainly of very light pieces of the repertoire of the classical music and, increasingly, film music that is suitable for conscious listening. Complete works of classical music are not played, but rather selected movements, which can be enjoyed individually.

1.7 million people listen to Klassik Radio every day and 204.000 in an average hour (according to Media Analysis 2012 Radio I). These listeners are the premium target group in Germany because they have a high income, a high education above-average, a wide range of interests and they are very interested in culture.

== History ==
1990

Klassik Radio is first aired on 28 October.

1999

After long negotiations Ulrich R. J. Kubak (CEO of Klassik Radio) succeeds in taking over the majority of the shares in Klassik Radio from Burda, Spiegel, RTL, Universal, BMG and Christoph Gottschalk. Afterwards the program, the station and the marketing were completely relaunched.

2002

The number of listeners of Klassik Radio more than doubled since the acquisition by Ulrich R. J. Kubak. Relocation of the headquarters in Augsburg in the Media Tower.

2004

The Klassik Radio AG went public on the Frankfurt Stock Exchange and is listed at the regulated market.

== Frequencies ==
=== FM ===
Baden-Württemberg

- 90,4 Karlsruhe
- 103,0 Göppingen
- 103,9 Stuttgart

Bavaria

- 91,1 Regensburg
- 92,1 Würzburg
- 92,2 Augsburg
- 105,1 Nuremberg
- 107,2 Munich

Berlin

- 101,3 Berlin (Alexanderplatz)

Brandenburg

- 87,6 Brandenburg an der Havel
- 91,0 Frankfurt (Oder)
- 101,3 Potsdam

Hamburg

- 98,1 Hamburg (Heinrich-Hertz-Turm)

Hesse

- 88,0 Gießen
- 93,8 Bad Hersfeld
- 96,0 Butzbach
- 100,5 Wetzlar / Aßlar
- 102,0 Limburg an der Lahn
- 102,8 Fulda
- 104,9 Marburg
- 103,4 Bingen am Rhein
- 104,1 Kassel
- 107,5 Frankfurt am Main

Mecklenburg-Vorpommern

- 90,1 Schwerin
- 97,0 Wismar
- 98,9 Stralsund

Lower Saxony

- 107,4 Hanover

Schleswig-Holstein

- 89,8 Heligoland
- 89,8 Sylt / Westerland
- 91,7 Garding
- 92,7 Itzehoe
- 92,9 Rendsburg
- 93,6 Lübeck / Berkenthin
- 93,9 Güby
- 94,7 Niebüll
- 97,2 Bungsberg / Eutin
- 97,4 Kiel
- 100,8 Schleswig
- 106,5 Flensburg

Thuringia

- 88,7 Weimar
- 90,9 Eisenach
- 99,3 Gotha
- 104,5 Gera
- 107,5 Altenburg

Tyrol (Austria)

- 88,0 Wattens
- 95,1 Inzing
- 95,5 Innsbruck

Salzburg (Austria)

- 99,8 Salzburg
- 102,5 Salzburg

=== DAB+ ===
Klassik Radio is transmitted in digital radio in all over Germany and Austria. In Germany it is a program of block DR Deutschland and can be found in channel 5C which is in frequency 178.352 MHz. In Austria Klassik Radio is part of the DAB+ Austria block and can be found in channels 5B, 5D, 6A, 6D and 8A (depending on the region).

=== DVB-S ===
- Astra 19.2°E, Transponder 103, Frequency 12.4605 GHz, Polarisation: horizontal, Symbol rate 27,500 MB/s, FEC 3/4
