= Hotel Dorint An der Kongresshalle Augsburg =

Best-known skyscraper in the German city of Augsburg

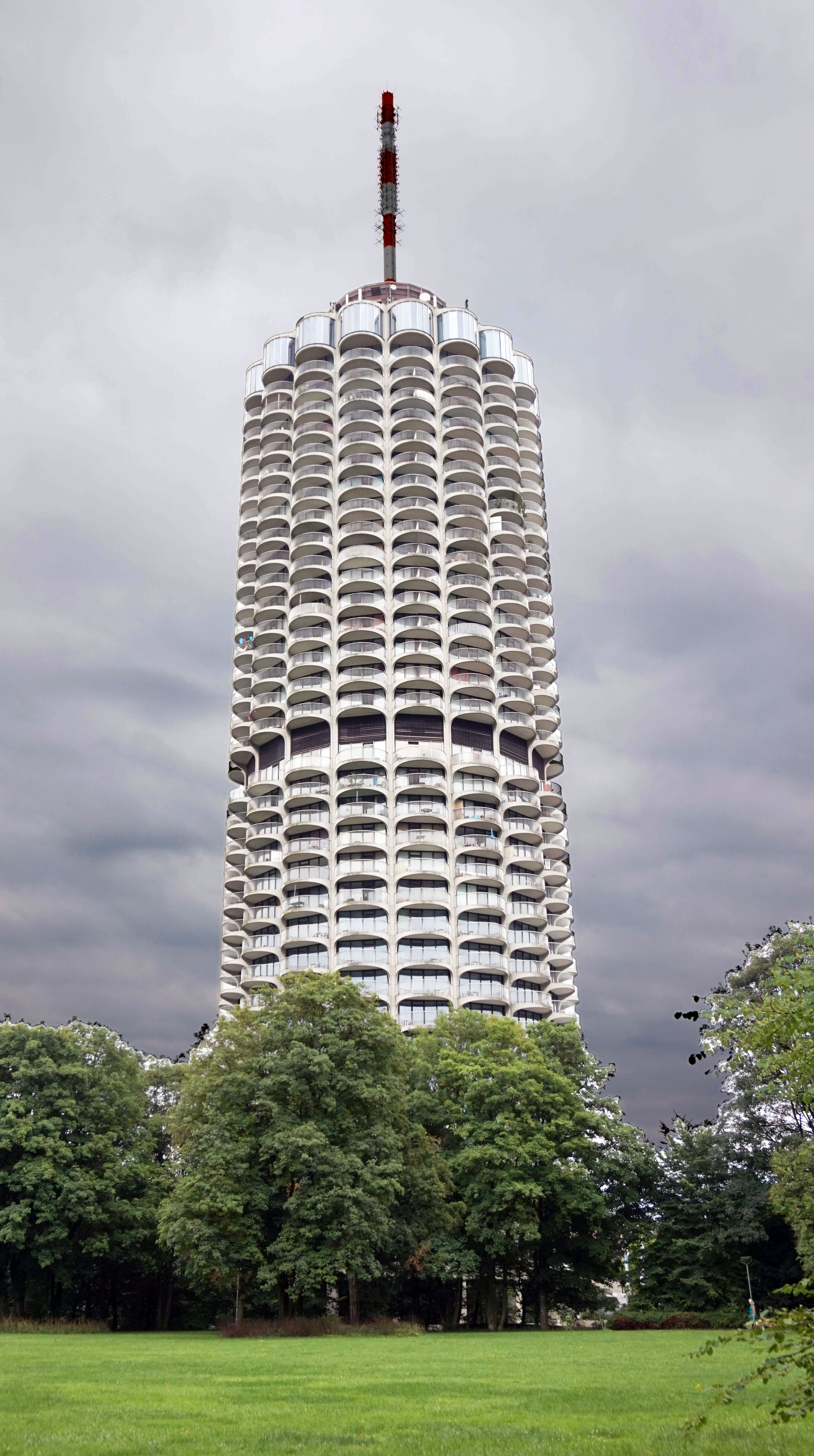
- Interactive map of the Hotel Dorint An der Kongresshalle Augsburg area

General information
- Status: Completed
- Type: Hotel, Residential
- Architectural style: High-rise
- Location: Augsburg, Germany
- Coordinates: 48°21′34″N 10°53′09″E
- Opening: 1972

Height
- Antenna spire: 167 m (548 ft)
- Roof: 115 m (377 ft)

Technical details
- Floor count: 35

The Hotel Dorint An der Kongresshalle Augsburg is the best-known skyscraper in the German city of Augsburg and visible throughout the city. At 167 m, it is the highest building in the Augsburg area and among the ten highest in Bavaria. It is located at the intersection of Gögginger Straße and Imhofstraße, in the borough of Göggingen. In its vicinity are the Congress Hall and Wittelsbacher Park.

The building is architecturally similar to the Marina City towers in Chicago. The tower is nicknamed "Maiskolben" (corncob) by locals because of its cylindrical shape with numerous bulges.

== History ==
=== Origin of the tower ===
The former Augsburg agricultural machinery dealer Otto Schnitzenbaumer had the tower built on the occasion of the 20th Olympic Games in Munich 1972 at a cost of 50 million Deutschmark and thereby fulfilled his desire to build a "symbol of modern Augsburg". Planning for the project soon faced resistance from inhabitants, however, leading to the founding of the "Save the Wittelsbacher park" campaign. Construction began in April 1971.

In order to keep to the planned build-time, the 18-sided interior which houses the lifts and stairwells was constructed from concrete cast in situ and the pre-cast concrete parts for the balconies and roofs were manufactured on site in an installation erected for that purpose. After a fourteen-month construction period, on 2 July 1972 the 400-bed Holiday Inn hotel welcomed its first guests, the 279 apartments were ready for people to move in, and the restaurant on the 35th floor and the viewing platform on the 34th floor gained much popularity.

=== A period of difficulties for the tower ===
In 1974, the unexpected news came that the building had been sold to Johann Nepomuk Glöggler's company in Luxembourg. The sales contract was however revoked in February 1976 because the money for the purchase had not been paid and the building returned to its original owner, but since Otto Schnitzenbaumer also had financial problems, the tower was put up for compulsory auction in 1979 at a guide price of 35 million Deutschmark by order of the court. Yet nobody wanted to buy it at this price.

At the second attempt, on 5 March 1980, the tower was purchased for 20 million Deutschmark by Landesbank Hessen (now Landesbank Hessen-Thüringen). They wanted to re-sell the building, but due to lack of prospective customers the tower was divided up in 328 property units to be sold separately. The hotel part of the tower with restaurant, consisting of the lower eleven and the two highest floors as well as the parking level went to the entrepreneur Franz Lauer from Fürth.

That was however far from being the end of the building's problems: in April 1989 the Swiss company "Toga Hotels" acquired the building's hotel wing, whose lease to Holiday Inn ran out one year later. Swiss operator Martin Zoller re-opened the hotel under the name Turmhotel ("Tower Hotel"), but he was forced to declare bankruptcy in March 1993. The 303 beds were controlled by the trustees of the bankrupt's estate, who suggested a new use for the building as a home for asylum-seekers or the elderly. Since the city strongly opposed these plans, they were again rejected and the 185 hotel rooms remained unused.

On 8 May 1996 the hotel wing again went into administration and was again put up for auction. It went for 20.9 million Deutschmark to the "First National Holding Venezuela" owned by the mineral oil company Hertel, who wanted to establish a 3-Star hotel under the name of "Goodnight" for a price of 7.2 million Deutschmark. This hotel would have had 108 rooms and, as well as, seven floors being used as a home for the elderly and the disabled. For years, however, nothing happened.

=== Renaissance ===
In January 2000 the solution arrived for the owners of apartments in the building, who until that time had also had to carry the additional cost of the hotel wing: the entrepreneur Dr. Wolfgang Ebertz from Cologne purchased the hotel for 12 million Deutschmark. After seven years of inactivity, the builders now came and completely refit the building, investing 45 million Deutschmark into it. In the year 2002 the hotel was reopened as the Dorint.

Millions were also invested in refurbishing the private apartments above the hotel, which now possess among other things a new entrance with a concierge and the largest video monitoring system in any German house. The facade was also renovated.

== Transmission installations ==
The hotel tower has an antenna mast on its roof, from which the following VHF radio channels are transmitted:

Frequency	Power	Station name
87.9 MHz	150 W	Rock-Antenne
92.2 MHz	300 W	Klassik Radio1
93.4 MHz	300 W	Radio Fantasy
94.8 MHz	100 W	egoFM
96.7 MHz	300 W	Hit Radio RT 1
104.2 MHz	100 W	Antenne Bayern
