= Marina City =

Development in Chicago, Illinois

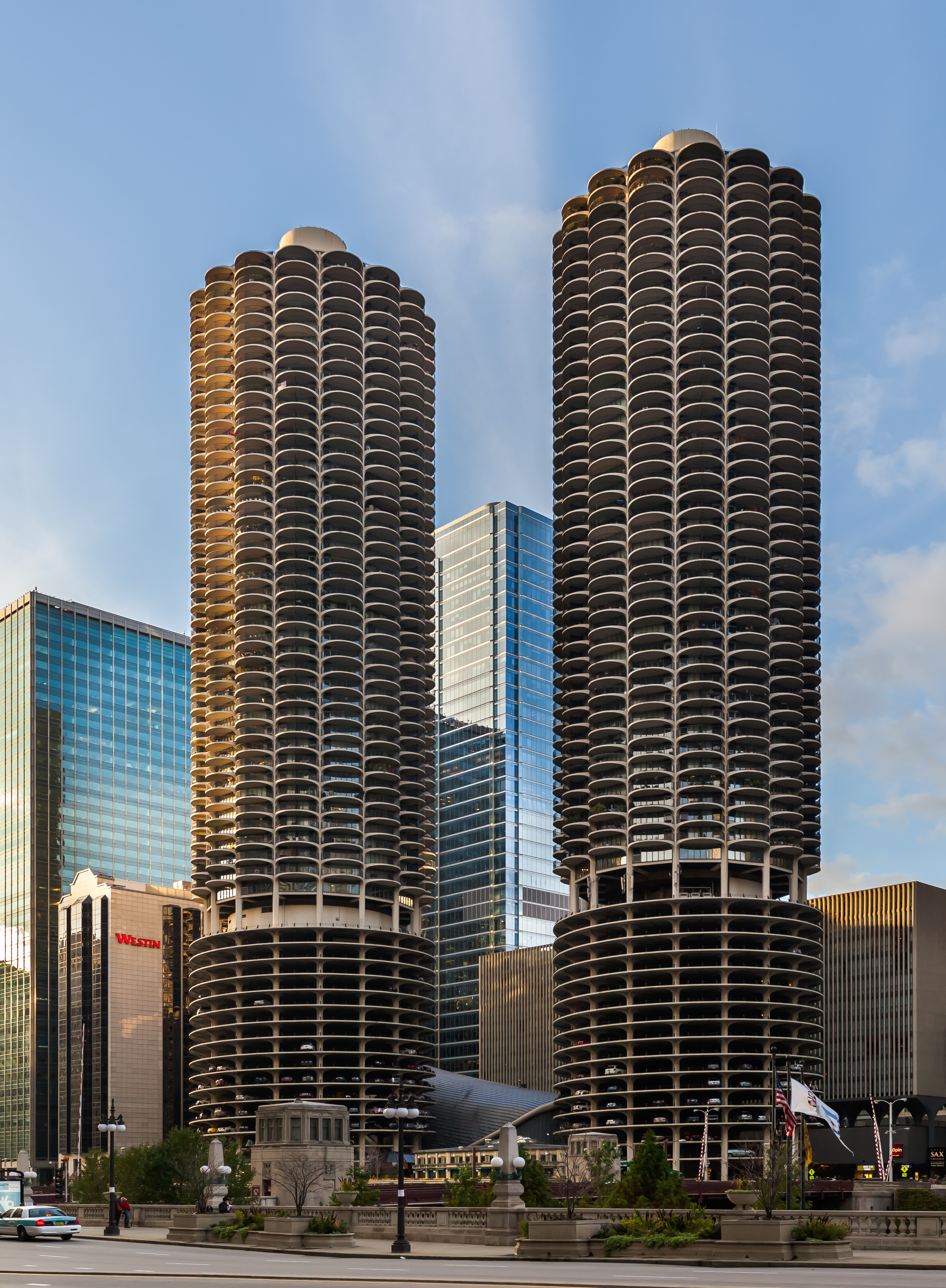
- Marina City in 2012, seen from bridge over the Chicago River

General information
- Type: Mixed use: Residential, parking
- Location: State Street, Chicago, Illinois, United States
- Coordinates: 41.887986°N 87.628761°W
- Completed: 1964–1968
- Cost: US$36 million (equivalent to $333 million in 2025)

Height
- Roof: 587 ft (179 m)

Technical details
- Floor count: 65

Design and construction
- Architect: Bertrand Goldberg
- Main contractor: A joint venture between Brighton Construction Co., Owner: Thomas J. Bowler and James McHugh Construction Co.

Marina City is a mixed-use residential-commercial building complex in Chicago, Illinois, United States, designed by architect Bertrand Goldberg. The multi-building complex on State Street on the north bank of the Chicago River on the Near North Side, directly across from the Loop, opened between 1963 and 1967. Portions of the complex were designated a Chicago Landmark in 2016. The towers' symbolic similarity to rural Illinois corncobs has been noted in media.

The complex consists of two 587-foot (179 m), 65-story apartment towers, opened in 1963, which include physical plant penthouses. It also includes a 10-story office building (later a hotel) opened in 1964, and a saddle-shaped auditorium building originally used as a cinema. The four buildings, access driveways, and a small plaza that once included an ice rink are built on a raised platform next to the Chicago River. Beneath the platform, at river level, is a small marina for pleasure craft, giving the structures their name.

== History ==
The Marina City complex was designed in 1959 by architect Bertrand Goldberg and constructed between 1961 and 1968 at a cost of $36 million, financed to a large extent by Building Service Employees International Union, a union of building janitors and elevator operators, who sought to reverse the pattern of white flight from the city's downtown area. When finished, the two towers were both the tallest residential buildings and the tallest reinforced concrete structures in the world. The complex was built as a "city within a city", featuring numerous on-site facilities including a theater, gym, swimming pool, ice rink, bowling alley, stores, restaurants, and its namesake marina.

Marina City was built in a joint venture with Brighton Construction Company (owner: Thomas J. Bowler) and James McHugh Construction Company. James McHugh Construction Co. subsequently built Water Tower Place in 1976 and Trump Tower in 2009, both of which were also the tallest reinforced concrete structures in the world at the times they were built. Marina City was the first building in the United States to be constructed with the Linden climbing tower cranes.

WLS-TV (ABC Channel 7) transmitted from an antenna atop Marina City until the Willis Tower (formerly known as Sears Tower) was completed. Local radio station WCFL operated out of Marina City in the office building of the complex. Local television station WFLD (FOX Channel 32) had its studios and transmitter at Marina City for 18 years until they were bought by Metromedia.

Marina City was one of the first major post-war urban high-rise residential complexes in the United States, and is widely credited with beginning the residential renaissance of American inner cities. Its model of mixed residential and office uses and high-rise towers with a base of parking has become a primary model for urban development in the United States and throughout the world, and has been widely copied throughout many cities internationally.

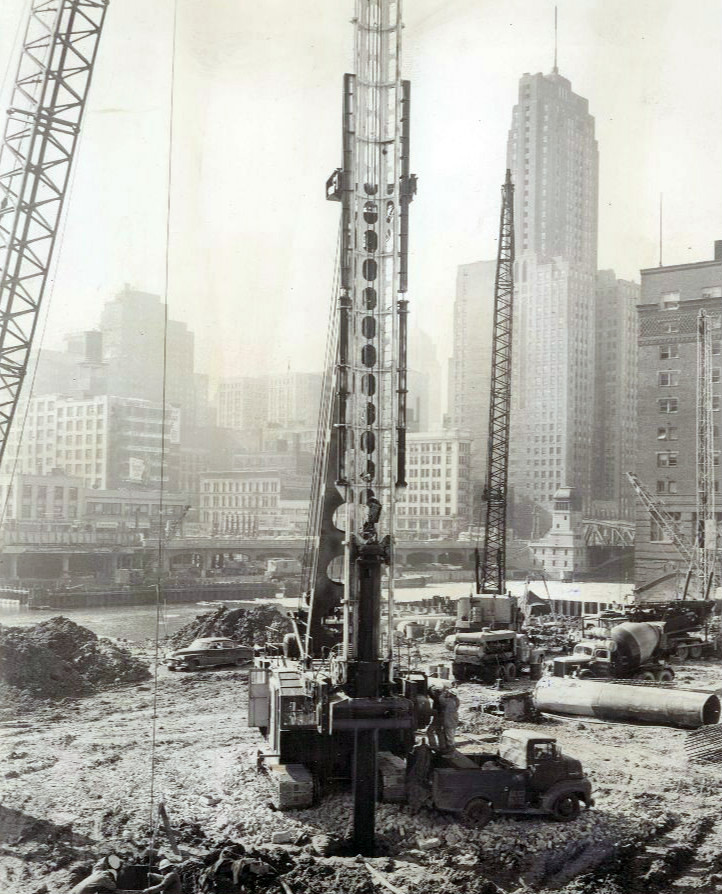
The foundation of Marina City being laid in 1961

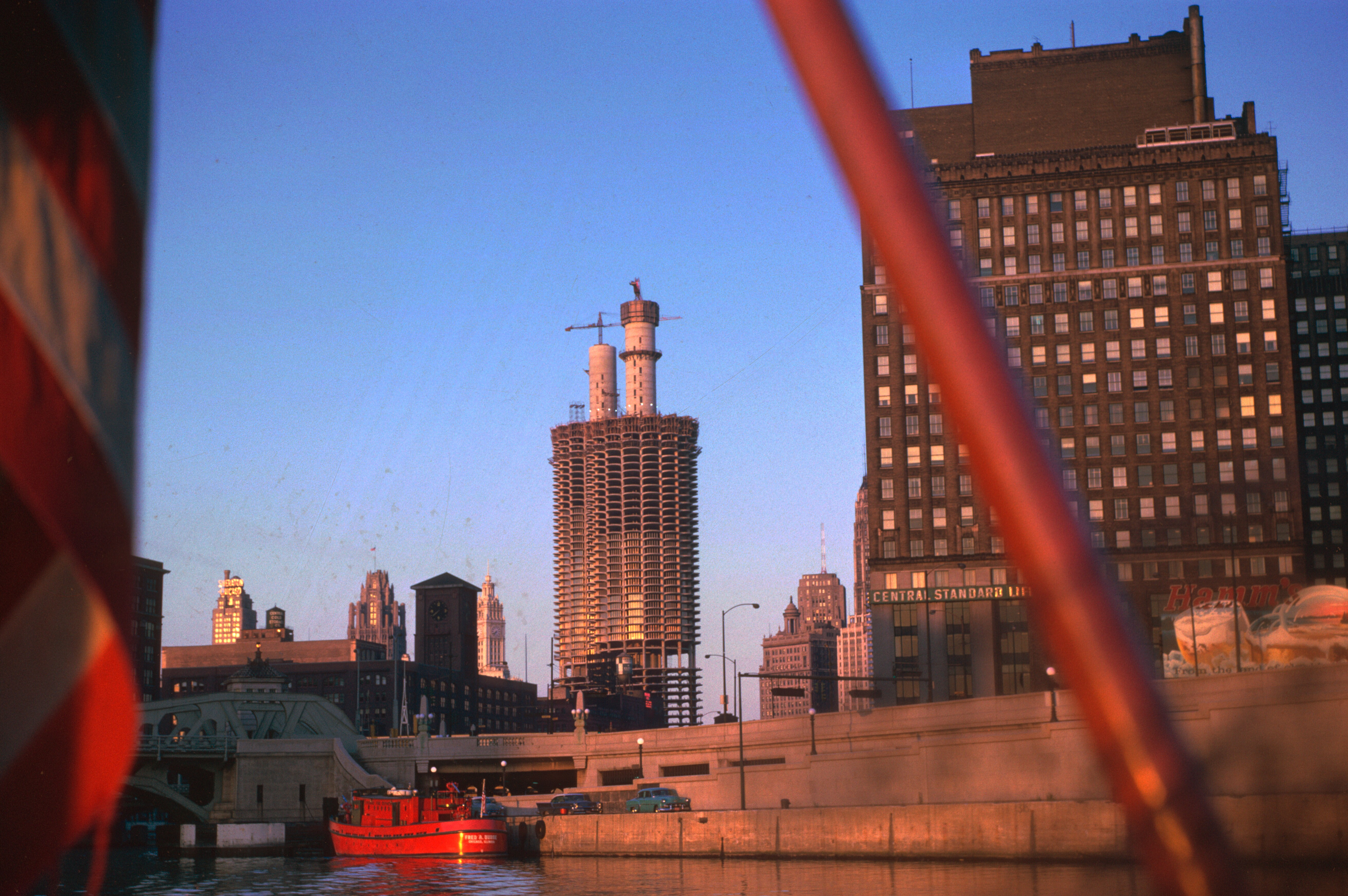
Marina City under construction

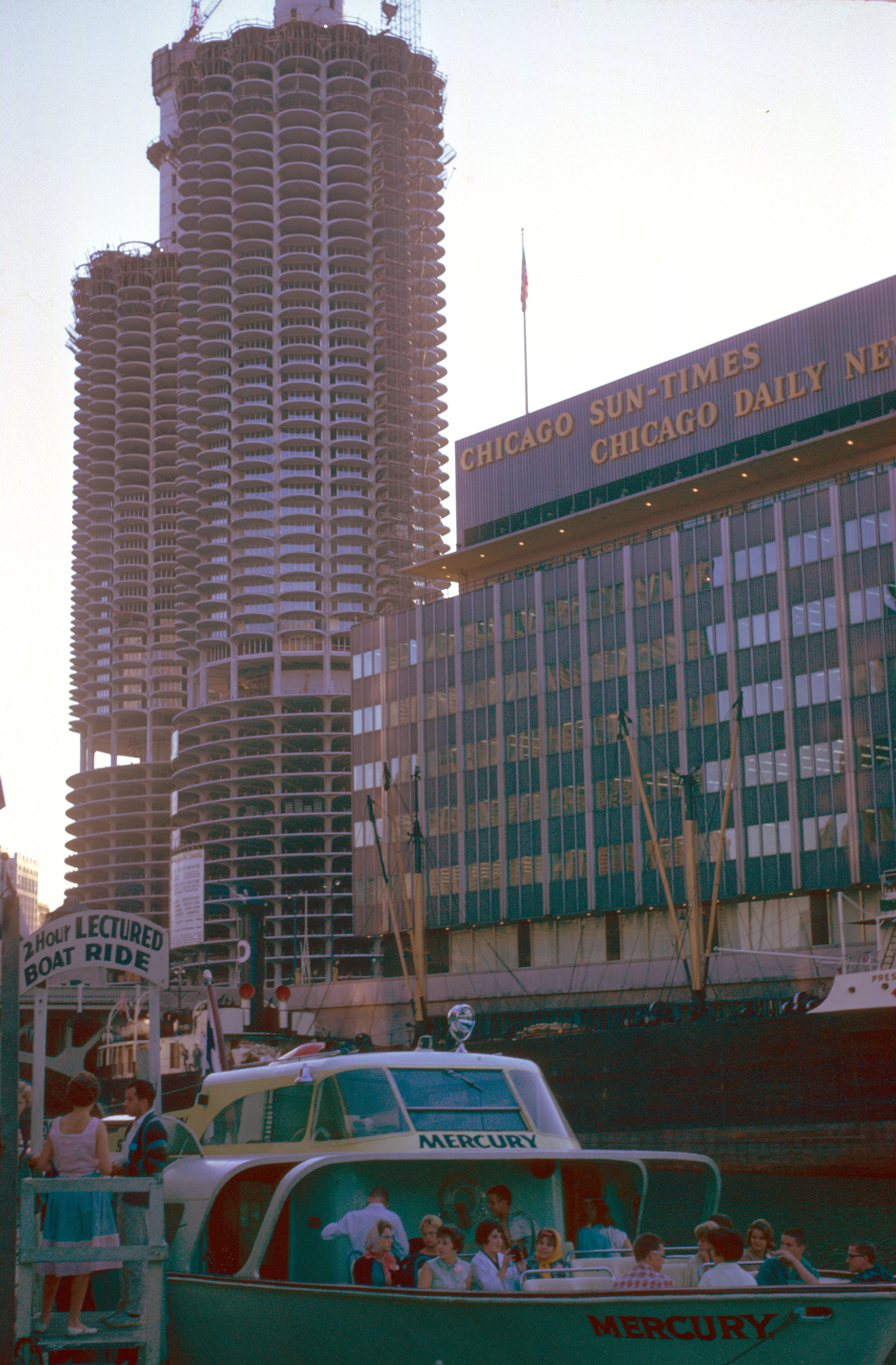
Another view of the construction

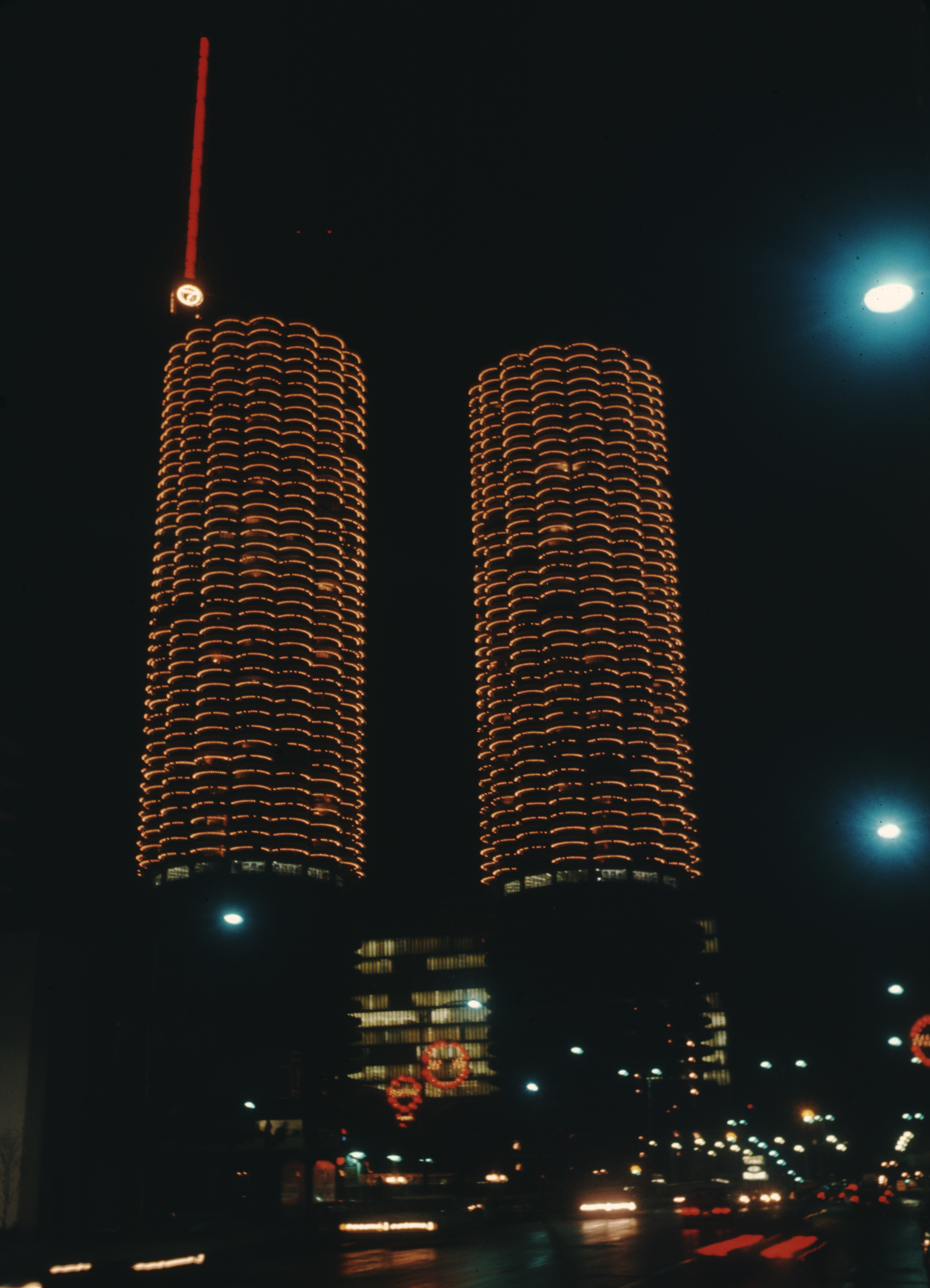
Marina City in 1969. Note the television transmitter with weather beacon on top of one of the towers.

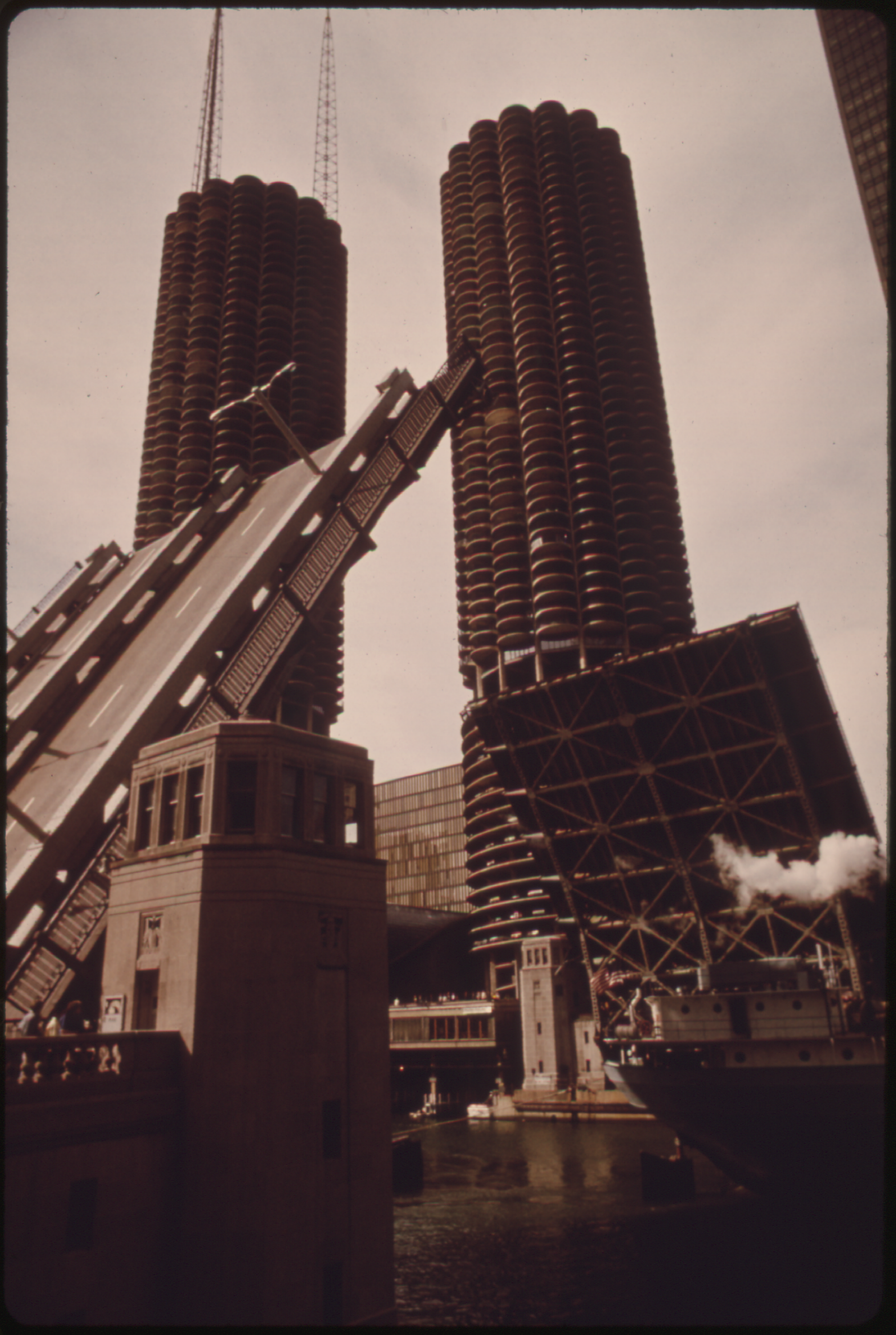
The towers as photographed by Documerica in October 1973

== Architecture ==
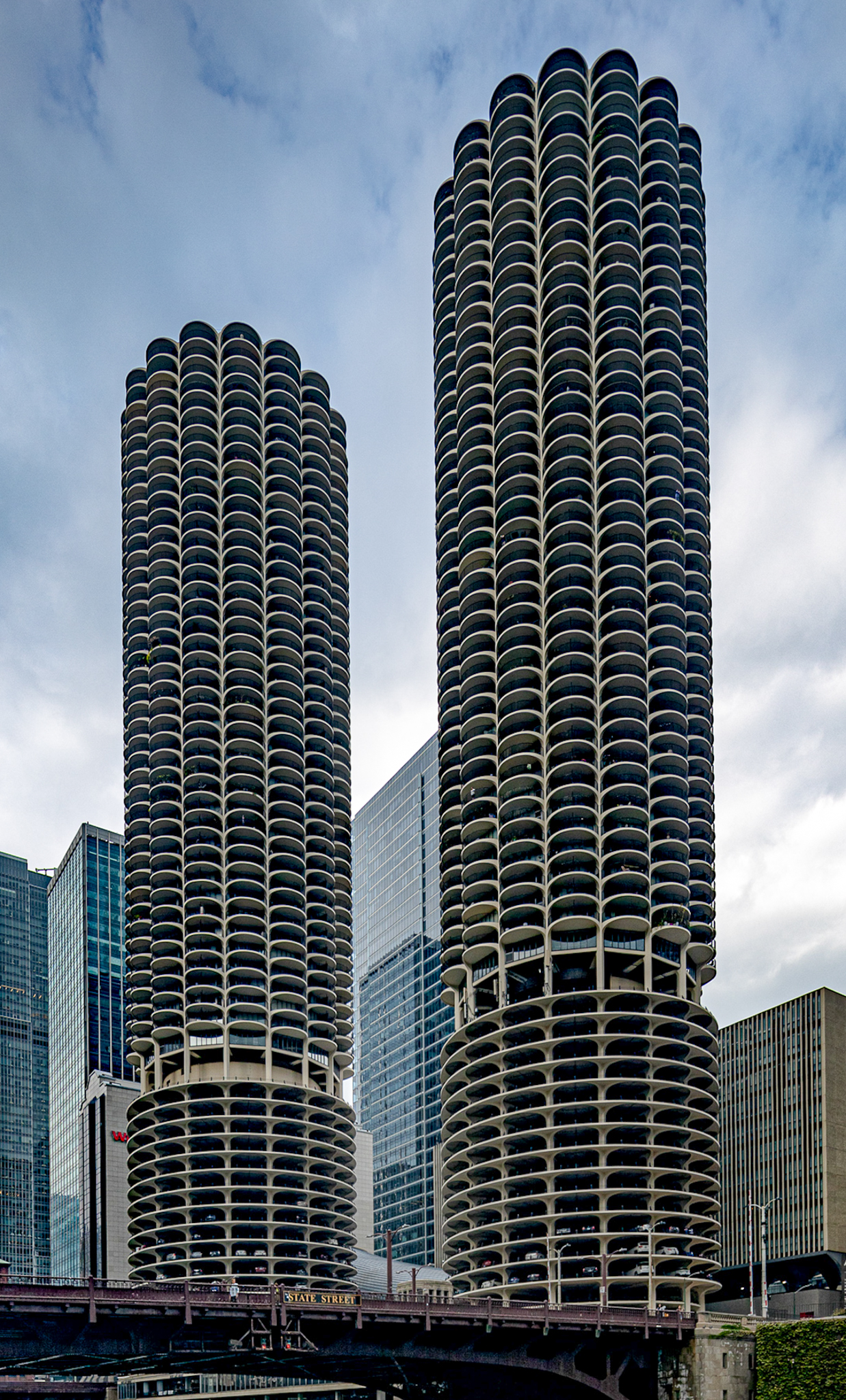
Marina City, designed by Bertrand Goldberg.

The two towers contain identical floor plans. The bottom 19 floors form an exposed spiral parking ramp operated by valet with approximately 896 parking spaces. The 20th floor of each contains a laundry room with panoramic views of the Loop, while floors 21 through 60 contain apartments (450 per tower). A 360-degree open-air roof deck lies on the 61st and top story. The buildings are accessed from separate lobbies that share a common below-grade mezzanine level as well as ground-level plaza entrances beside the House of Blues. Originally rental apartments, the complex converted to condominiums in 1977, but still contains a number of rental units.

Marina City apartments are unusual in containing almost no interior right angles. On each residential floor, a circular hallway surrounds the elevator core, which is 32 feet (9.8 m) in diameter, with 16 sector-shaped units arrayed around the hallway. Apartments are composed of these units. Bathrooms and kitchens are located towards the inside of the building. Living areas occupy the outermost areas of each unit. Each unit terminates in a 175-square-foot (16.3 m^{2}) semi-circular balcony, separated from living areas by a floor-to-ceiling window wall. Because of this arrangement, every single living room and bedroom in Marina City has a balcony.

The apartments are also unusual in that the sole utility is electricity; neither natural gas nor propane are used. The apartments have no central hot water, air conditioning, or heat, unlike common practice when the towers were built. Instead, each unit has individual water heaters, heating and cooling units, and electric stoves; residents pay individually for electricity for these appliances. This may have been financially astute on the part of the building owners; at the time the towers were constructed, local electric utility Commonwealth Edison supplied expensive building transformers at little or no charge, provided the buildings were made all-electric.

In addition, the residential towers have high speed elevators. It takes approximately 33 seconds to travel from the lower-level lobby to the 61st floor roof decks.

The towers were awarded a prize by the New York Chapter of the American Institute of Architects in 1965 for their innovations.

The appearance of the towers has been compared to The Corinthian, an apartment building in New York City.

In 2007, the condominium board controversially claimed to own the common law copyright and trademark rights to the name and image of the buildings, although they do not own the parking garages located below the 20th floor. They have claimed that any commercial use (such as in film or other media such as web sites) of pictures of the buildings or of the name "Marina City" without permission is a violation of their intellectual property rights.

In celebration of the 2018 Illinois Bicentennial, Marina City was named one of the Illinois 200 Great Places by the American Institute of Architects Illinois component (AIA Illinois).

== Current use ==
The complex houses the House of Blues concert hall, restaurant and bar, the Hotel Chicago, 10Pin Bowling Lounge, and four restaurants (Yolk, Smith and Wollensky, Katana, and Legal Sea Foods).

The House of Blues concert hall was built in the shell of the complex's long-disused movie theater. Similarly, the hotel was built in what was once the Marina City office building. In order to accommodate Smith and Wollensky, the former skating rink was demolished. Pedestrian and vehicular access to the residential towers and the raised common plaza were redesigned. In 2006, decorative lighting was installed around the circular roofs of the mechanical sheds that top each tower; the towers had not contained any such lighting since the 1960s.

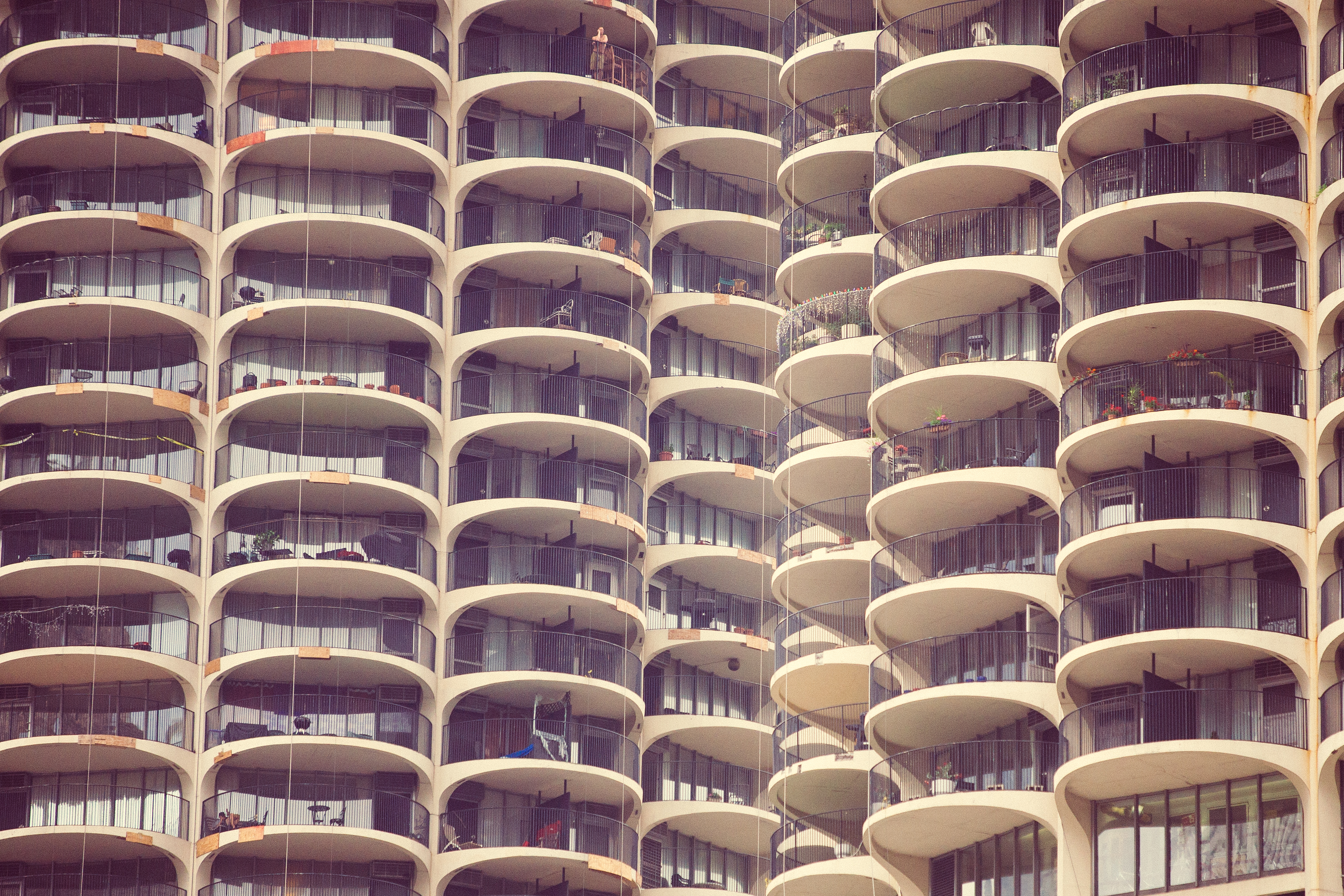
Marina City balconies

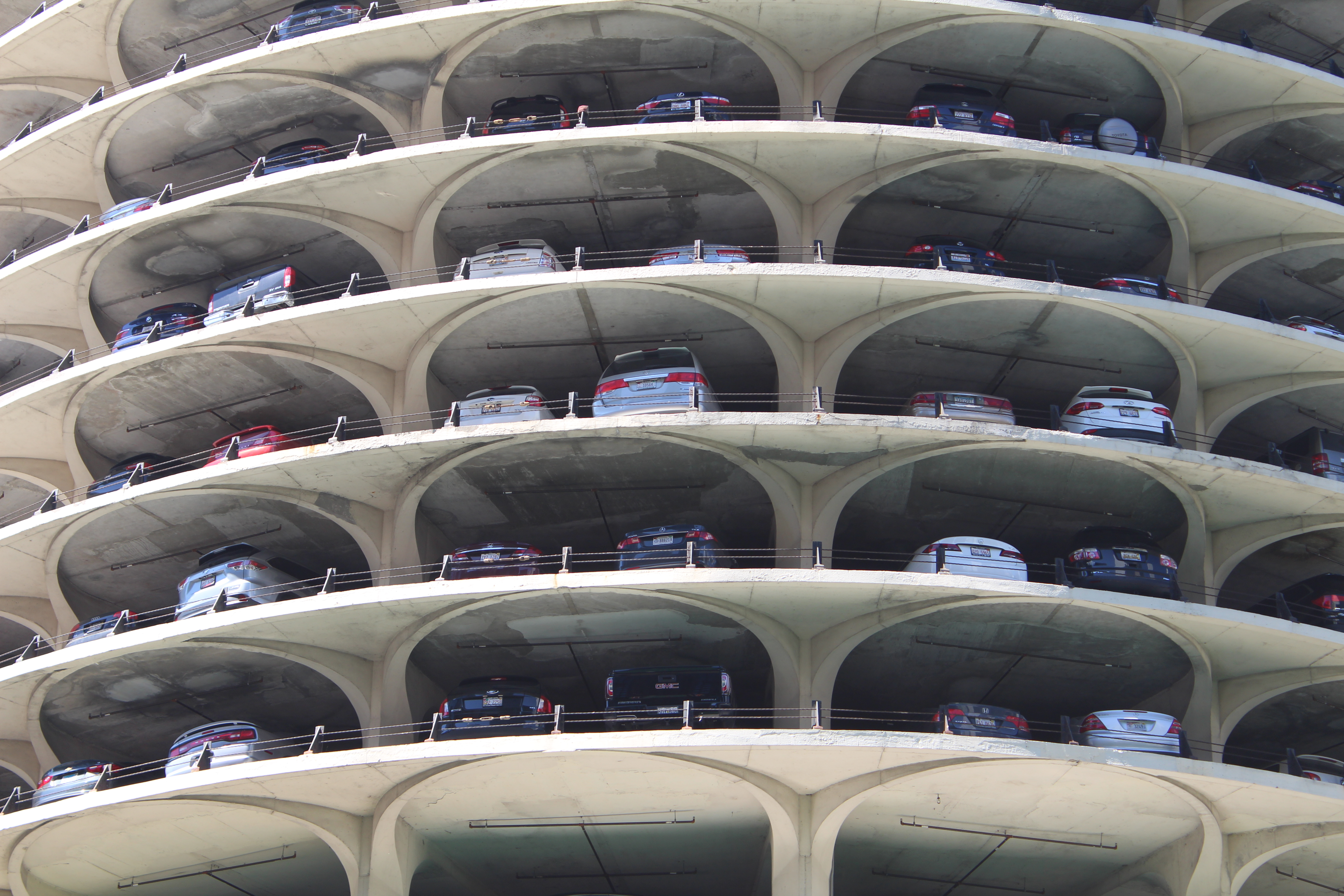
Close-up of Marina City parking

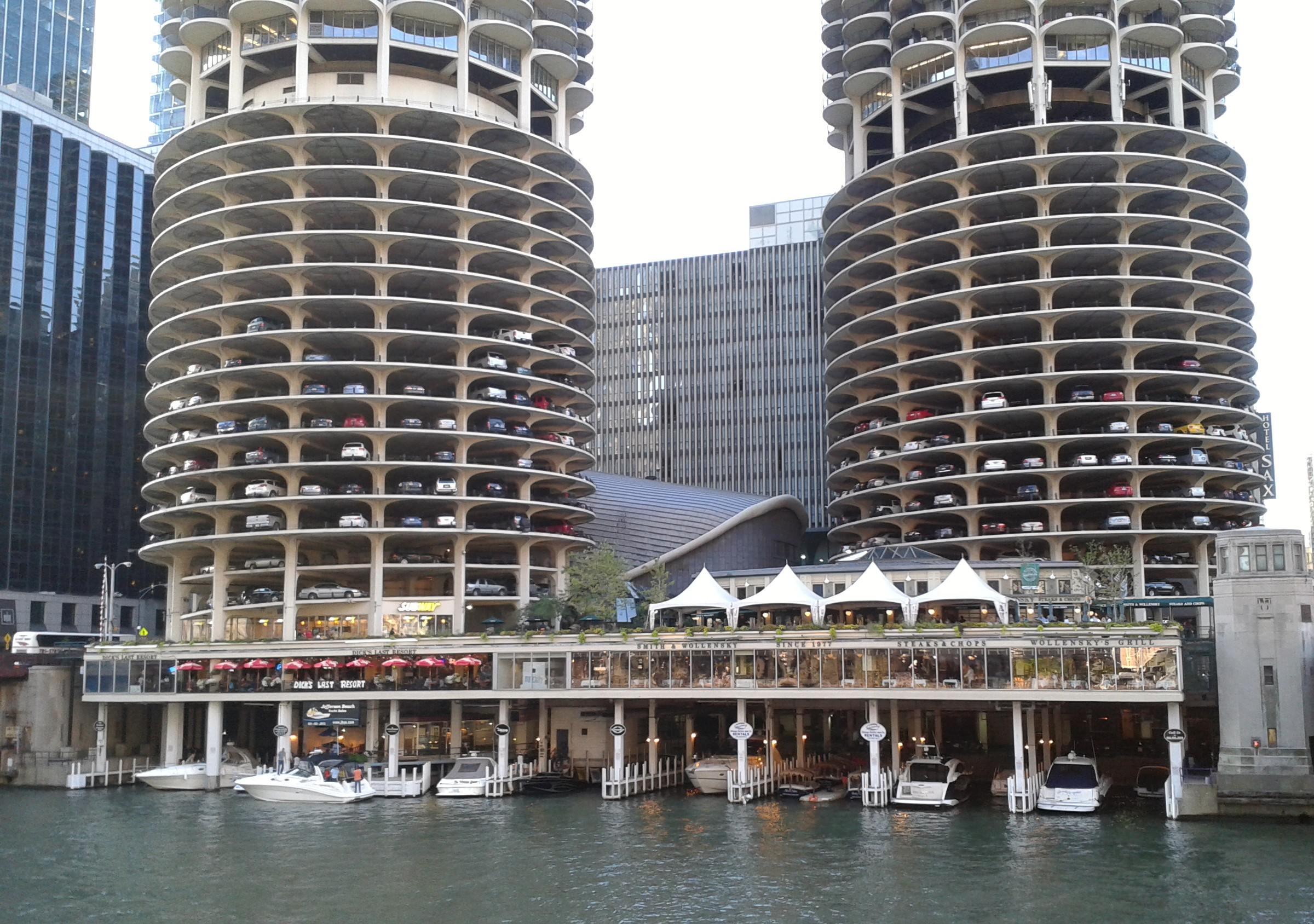
The Marina City marina

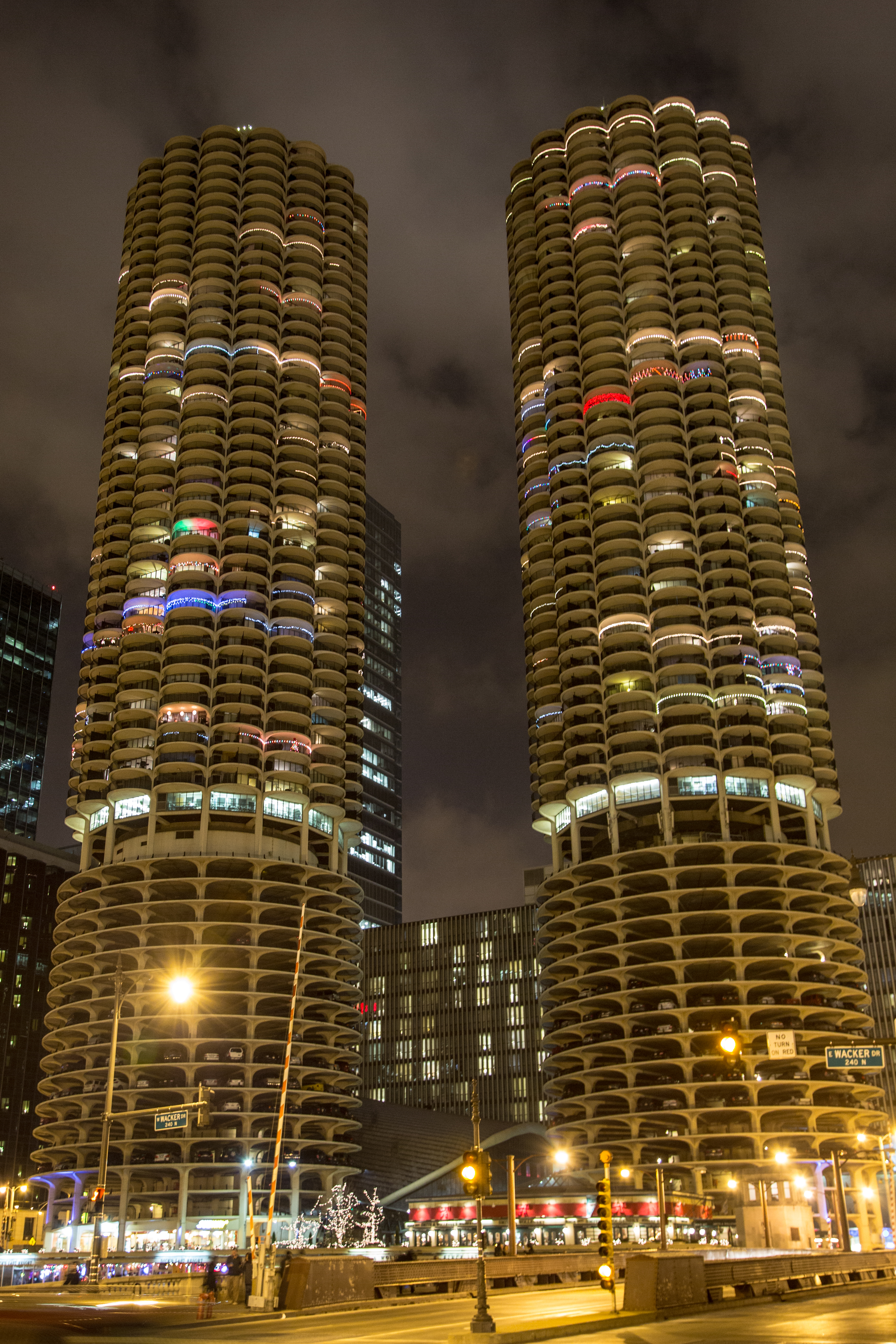
In December 2012. Note the lights on individual apartment balconies

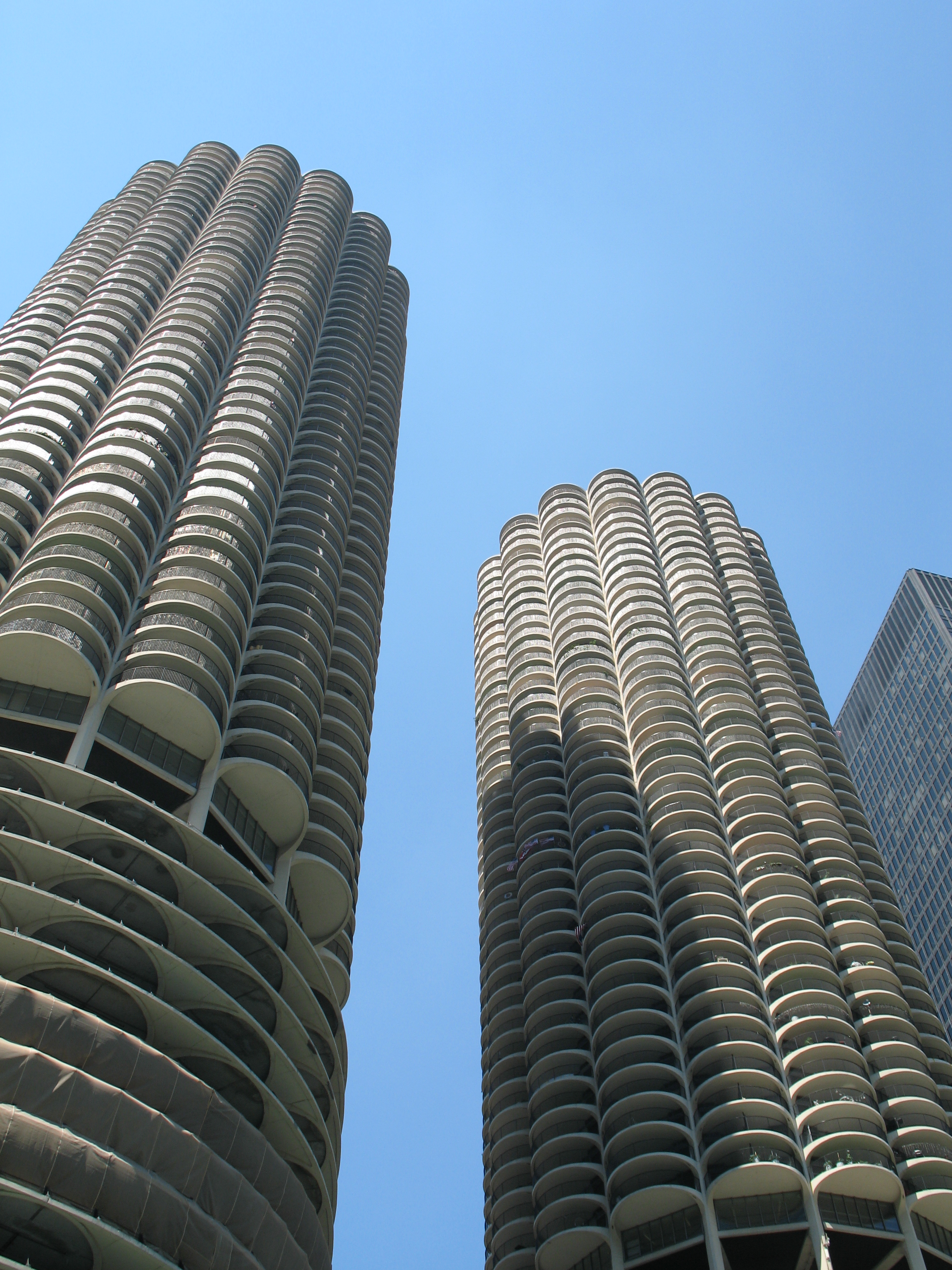
As viewed from a boat in the Chicago River

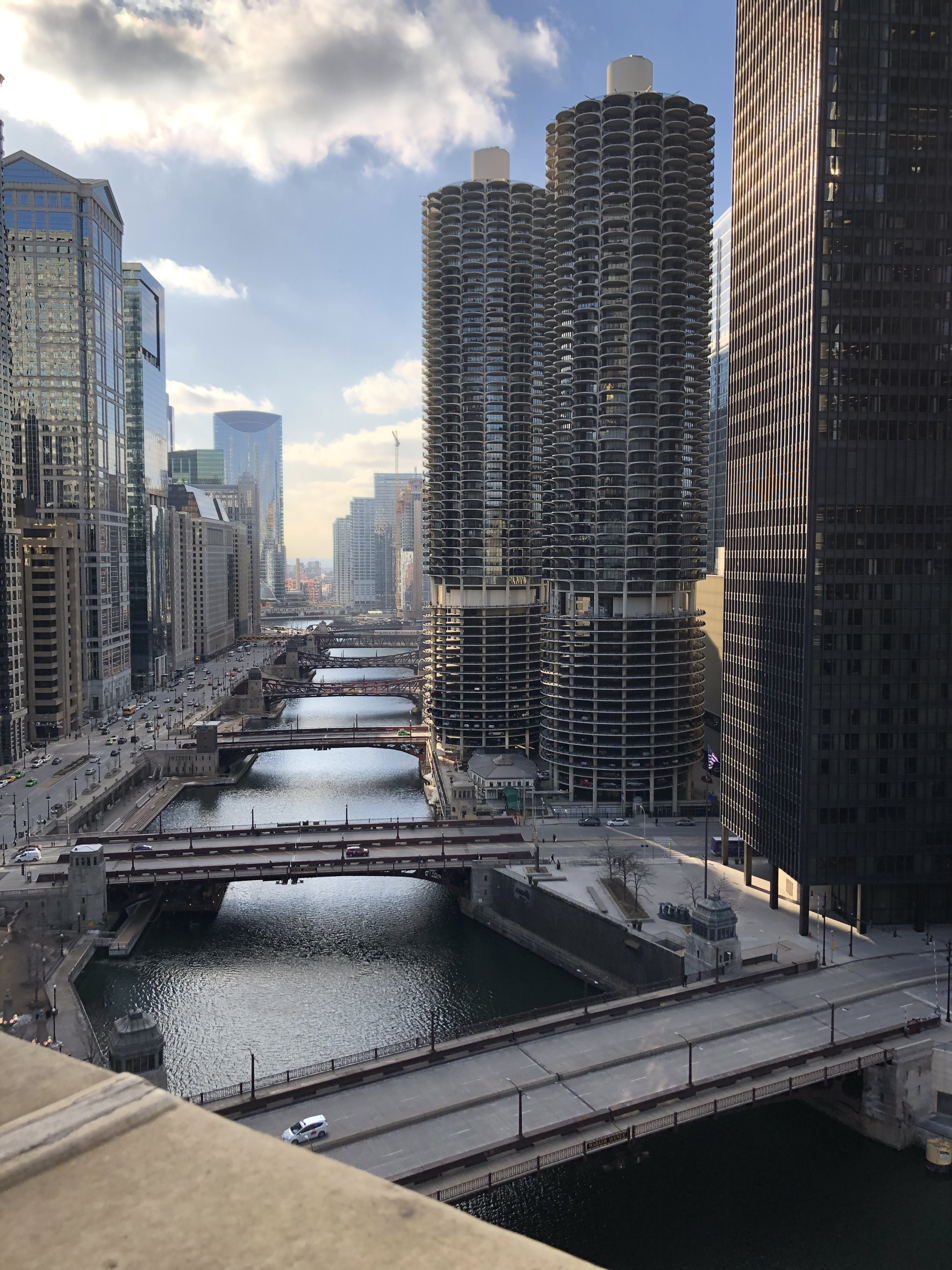
Marina City on the Chicago River. View from River Hotel

== In popular culture ==
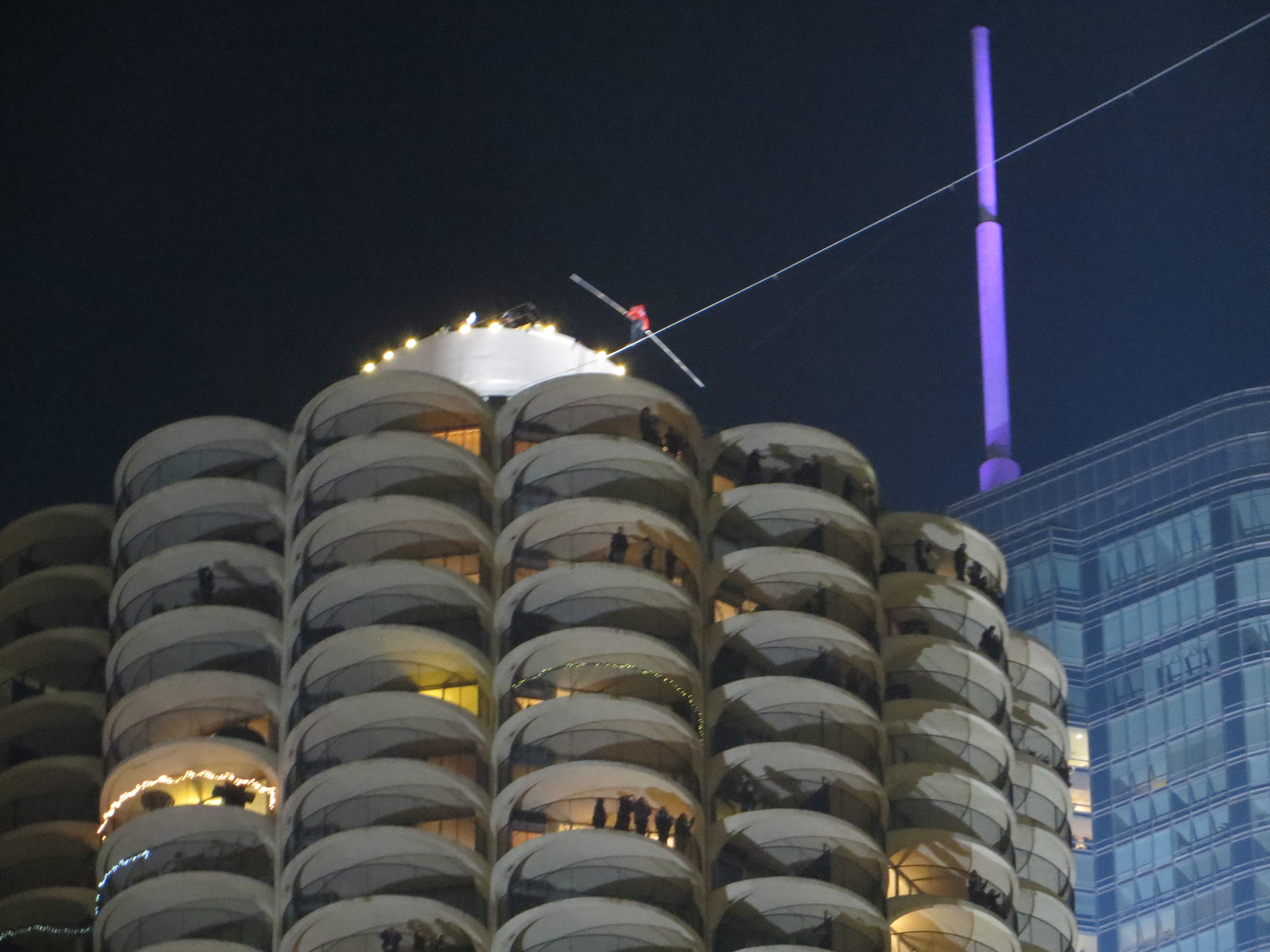
Nik Wallenda, tightrope walking on Marina City in 2014

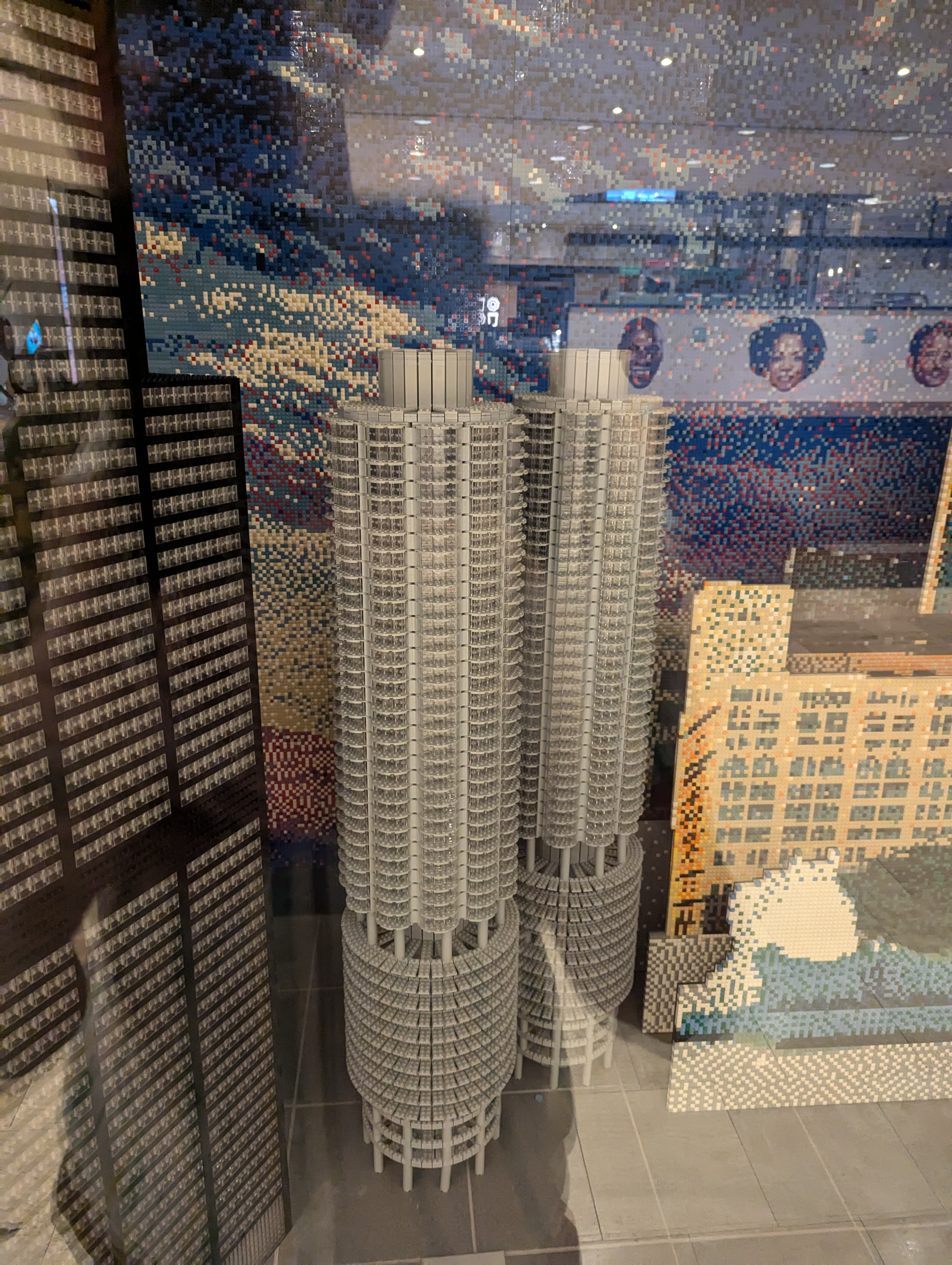
A Lego model of the Marina City towers in the display window at the Chicago Lego Store

- The towers are on the front cover of the album Yankee Hotel Foxtrot (2001) by Chicago band Wilco, which has led to Marina City occasionally being called the "Wilco Towers".
- The towers are in a collage on the rear cover of the 1971 Sly and the Family Stone album There's a Riot Goin' On.
- The towers are the basis for the cover art of the band Chicago's 1979 album, Chicago 13.
- One tower is on the cover of The Revolting Cocks' debut album Big Sexy Land, released in 1986 by Chicago label Wax Trax! Records.
- The label design used by Mercury Records in the 1970s and early 1980s featured a painting of the towers along with IBM Plaza and John Hancock Center.

The towers' appearances include:

- Goldstein (1964). Includes a sequence driving up the 14th floor parking levels.
- Mickey One (1965). Includes many scenes beside the part completed complex.
- The Bob Newhart Show (1972–1978). The opening sequence included a shot of Marina City, leading many to assume that the character lived there. Marina City is situated near the building that was used for exterior shots of Bob's office, 430 North Michigan Avenue. The building used for exterior shots of Bob's apartment sits 7 miles (11 km) to the north, on Sheridan Road in the Edgewater neighborhood.
- Three The Hard Way (1974), Jagger Daniels (Fred Williamson) is a resident in one of the towers.
- The Hunter (1980), "Papa" Thorson (Steve McQueen) pursues a suspect in a car chase through the parking garage. His quarry eventually loses control and drives off a high floor of the garage into the Chicago River. This scene was later recreated for an Allstate commercial in 2006/2007.
- Nothing In Common (1986), the parking ramp was used as a location in the Tom Hanks film.
- Ferris Bueller's Day Off (1986), the towers are seen during a helicopter flyby of the city.
- While You Were Sleeping (film) (1995), the towers are visible in the background when Lucy and her boss eat a hotdog on a bridge across the Chicago river.
- Chicago P.D. (2014–present), the second spin-off in the Chicago franchise trilogy. Marina City was used to film a scene in the season 3 episode "Debts of the Past", in which the Chicago Police Department detectives are staking out for and attempt to arrest a suspect.
- Emergency Call Ambulance (Sega 1999), Arcade racing videogame - the player drives between the towers in the third case, and the towers are visible from a longer distance in the final case as well.
- The Good Wife (2009–2016), in the episode “The Wheels of Justice”, Marina City is shown as the residence of attorney Diane Lockhart (Christine Baranski).
- Gunsmith Cats (Japanese manga, 1990–1997), Marina city's distinctive parking is featured in a car chase early in the series, which features remarkably accurate portrayals of Chicago's architecture and its surroundings.
- Candyman (2021), the character Finley Stephens, an art critic, lives in Marina City. The main character, Anthony McCoy (played by Yahya Abdul-Mateen II), also has one of his Candyman-based visions in her apartment.
- The Bear (2023), Sydney (played by Ayo Edebiri) goes on a food tour of Chicago in the second season episode "Sundae", and Marina City appears several times during a montage sequence where Sydney is inspired by the city's architecture, amongst other memories, to create a ravioli dish.
- The Fantastic Four: First Steps (2025), One tower of Marina City is transposed to New York, and seen during the battle at the film's climax.

== See also ==
- Architecture of Chicago
- Dorint Hotel Tower, Augsburg, Germany
- St George Wharf Tower, London
- The Sentinels, Birmingham, England
- The Corinthian (Manhattan), New York
- List of tallest buildings in Chicago

== Bibliography ==
- Jay Pridmore; George A. Larson (2005). Chicago Architecture and Design : Revised and expanded. New York: Harry N. Abrams, Inc. ISBN 0-8109-5892-9.
- Antonino Terranova (2003). Skyscrapers. White Star Publishers. ISBN 88-8095-230-7.
