= Untergiesing-Harlaching =

Borough of Munich, Germany

Coordinates: 48°05′32″N 11°33′38″E

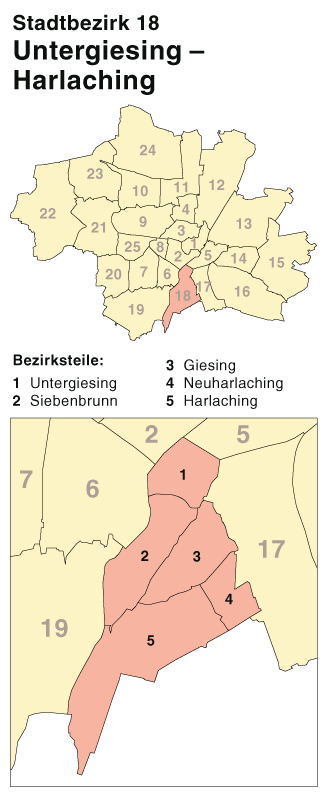
The borough's position in Munich

Untergiesing-Harlaching (German pronunciation: [ˈʊntɐˌɡiːzɪŋ ˈhaʁlaxɪŋ]; Central Bavarian: Untagiasing-Harlaching) is the 18th borough of Munich, Germany, mostly the districts of Untergiesing (lit. 'Lower Giesing') and Harlaching. The borough's western border is the river Isar, in the south it borders on Grünwald and the Perlacher Forst [German-language Wiki: Perlacher Forst]. (Perlach Forest), to the north-west on the Munich borough of Obergiesing and to the north on the borough of Au-Haidhausen.

== Subdivisions ==
=== Untergiesing ===
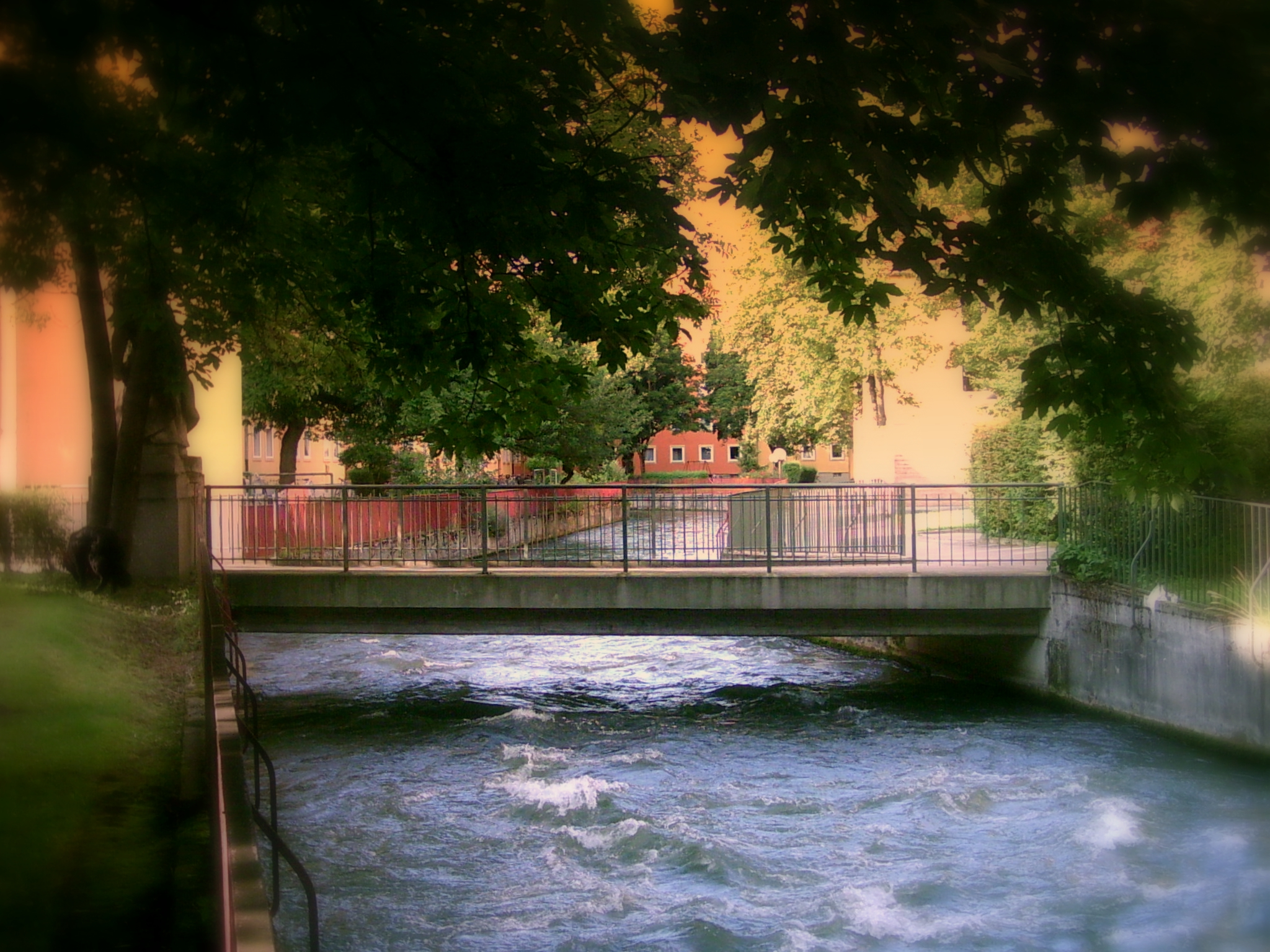
Auer Mühlbach river in Untergiesing

Untergiesing comprises the borough's northern end, limited by the river in the west, the high cliff on the east, the Humboltstraße to the north, and the Candidstraße, part of Munich's Mittlerer Ring ring road system, to the south.

=== Siebenbrunn ===
Siebenbrunn is located south of Untergiesing, sandwiched between the high cliff to the east and the river to the west. An important landmark is the Tierpark Hellabrunn (Munich Zoo), located in the district's southwest area, on the river.

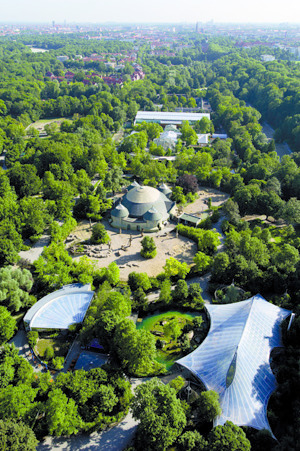
View over Siebenbrunn with the Munich Zoo

=== Harlaching and Neuharlaching ===
The Klinikum Harlaching hospital, which opened on 18 November 1899, is located in the Harlaching district.
