= Auer Mühlbach =

River in Germany

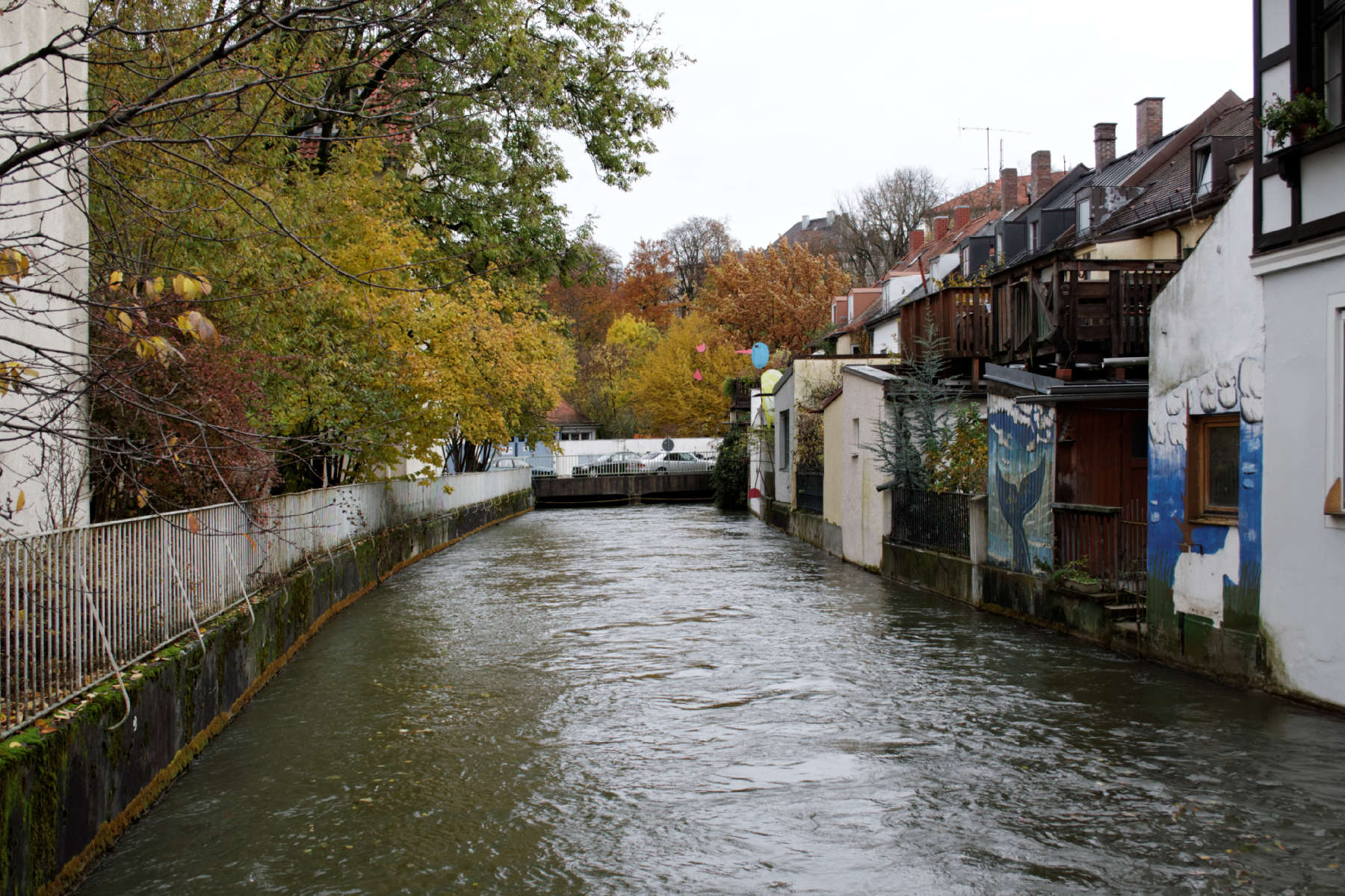
- The Auer Mühlbach, running behind the houses on the street Mondstraße in Giesing

- Location of mouth in Bavaria

Location
- Country: Germany
- State: Bavaria

Physical characteristics
- Source
  - location: Isar
  - coordinates: 48.0924°N 11.5506°E
- Mouth
  - location: Isar
  - coordinates: 48.1360°N 11.5920°E
- Length: 6.5 km (4.0 mi)

Basin features
- Progression: Isar→ Danube→ Black Sea

Auer Mühlbach (German pronunciation: [ˈaʊɐ ˈmyːlbax]) is a river in Bavaria, Germany. It is a branch of the Isar in the southern part of Munich.

== History ==
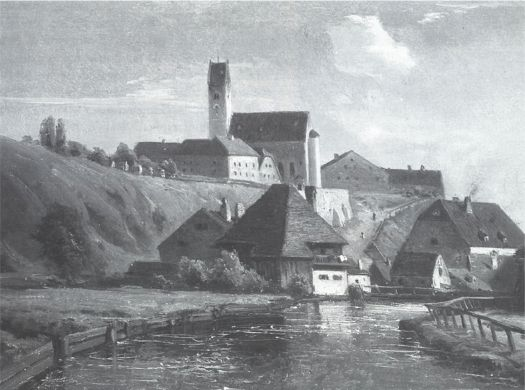
Auer Mühlbach in Giesing around 1850

Long before the "official" founding of the city of Munich, the water power of the Isar was used for the operation of mills. Since the Isar was a wild mountain river and until its increasing regulation from the 19th century on, it frequently changed its course and showed strong level fluctuations. The mill wheels in the Munich area were not built at the unpredictable main branch, but at a regulable, artificially diverted side branch with as constant a water flow as possible, the Mühlbach. The first written mention of the stream and a mill at Kiesingenum (today Untergiesing) is found in a document from the year 957.

== See also ==
- List of rivers of Bavaria

== Literature (in German) ==
- Michael Dosch: Projekt zur Isarregulierung und Bebauung der Stadtbezirke Au, München 1897. Monacensia 2° Mon. 59
- Christine Rädlinger: Geschichte der Münchner Stadtbäche. Herausgegeben vom Stadtarchiv München, Franz Schiermeier Verlag München 2004, ISBN 978-3-9809147-2-7
- Peter Klimesch: Drunt in der grünen Au. Die Nockherstraße im Wandel der Zeit. Norderstedt 2014. ISBN 978-3-7357-4929-1.
